= National Rural Electric Cooperative Association =

Umbrella organization representing electricity co-ops

- Abbreviation: NRECA
- Formation: 1942
- Type: Trade association
- Headquarters: Arlington, Virginia, United States
- Members: 900+ electric cooperatives
- Chief Executive Officer: Jim Matheson
- Website: www.electric.coop

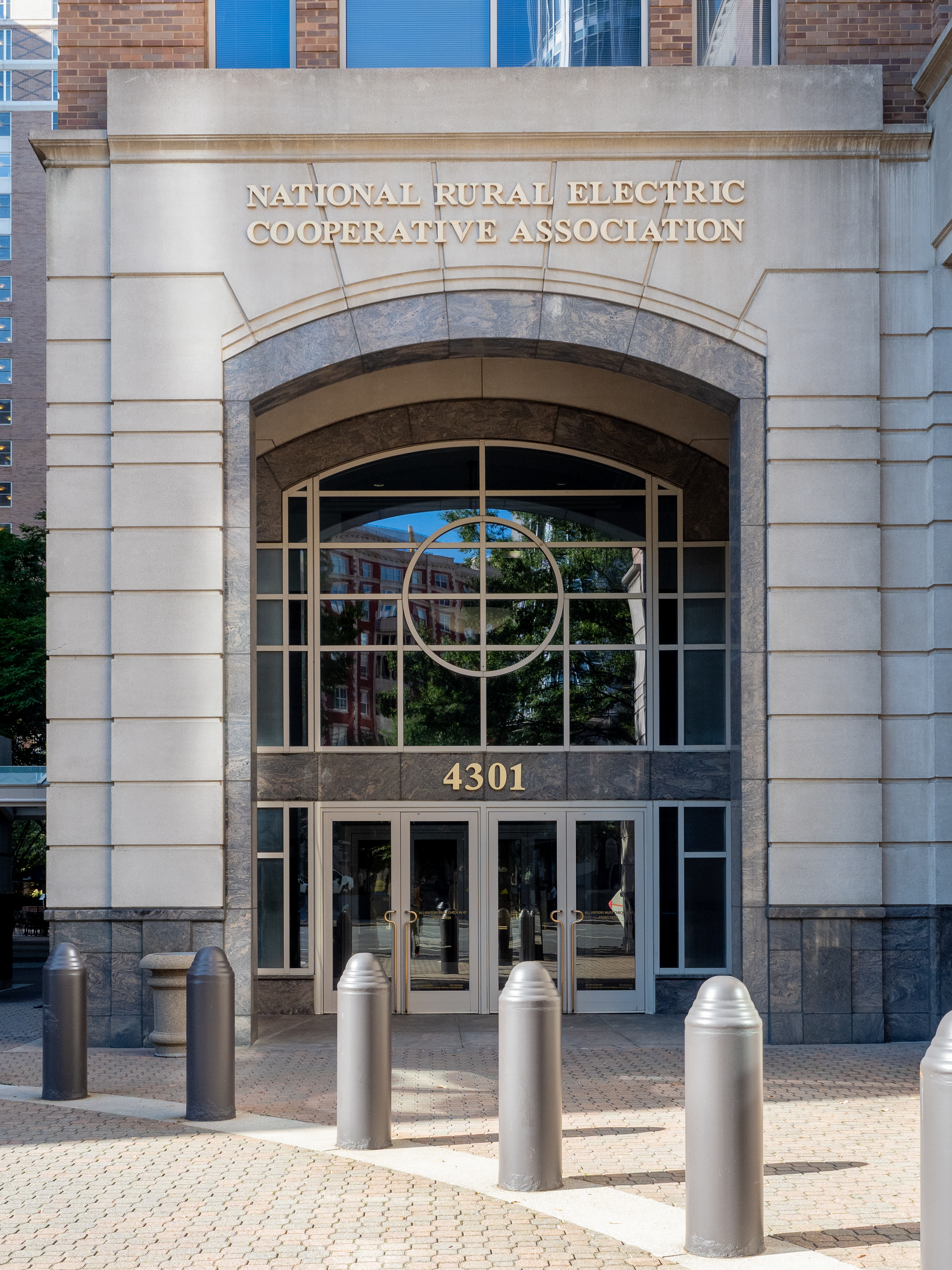
Headquarters in Arlington, VA (2022)

The National Rural Electric Cooperative Association (NRECA) represents the interests of over 900 electric cooperatives in the United States. Cooperatives are not-for-profit and are owned by their membership. Founded in 1942, NRECA unites the country's generation, transmission, and distribution cooperatives found in 47 states, serving over 40 million people. It is headquartered in Arlington, Virginia, and since 2016 its CEO has been former U.S. Congressman Jim Matheson.

Electric cooperatives serve 12 percent of the nation's population, yet own 42 percent of America's distribution lines covering three-quarters of the country. Currently, over 90% of electric cooperatives include renewable generation in their portfolios, receiving 11 percent of their total power from renewable sources compared to 8 percent for the entire utility sector.

In December 2020, co-ops under NRECA won $1.6 billion from the FCC's Rural Digital Opportunity Fund to provide rural broadband service to approximately 900,000 locations. In February 2021, NRECA's Matheson filed an appeal to the FCC for also awarding SpaceX's Starlink internet service funds. SpaceX was awarded $886 million to cover nearly 650,000 locations. Matheson noted the Starlink service was "still in beta testing - not a proven technology".

== List of electric cooperatives ==
535 electric cooperative service territories of the 800+ in the United States

This is a list of some of the 800+ cooperatives that have a wikipedia article:

- A&N Electric Cooperative
- Allegheny Electric Cooperative
- Arkansas Electric Cooperative Corporation
- Arkansas Valley Electric Cooperative
- Bailey County Electric Cooperative
- Basin Electric Power Cooperative
- Bluebonnet Electric Cooperative
- Bowie-Cass Electric Cooperative
- Brazos Electric Power Cooperative
- C&L Electric Cooperative
- Cape Hatteras Electric Cooperative
- Capital Electric Cooperative
- Carroll Electric Cooperative
- Cass County Electric Cooperative
- Cavalier Rural Electric Cooperative
- Central Power Electric Cooperative
- Central Texas Electric Cooperative
- Cherokee County Electric Cooperative
- Choptank Electric Cooperative
- Clay County Electric Cooperative
- Cloverland Electric Cooperative
- Coleman County Electric Cooperative
- Comanche Electric Cooperative
- Concho Valley Electric Cooperative
- Cooperative Energy
- Corn Belt Power Cooperative
- Craighead Electric Cooperative
- Dakota Valley Electric Cooperative
- Dairyland Power Cooperative
- Deaf Smith Electric Cooperative
- Deep East Texas Electric Cooperative
- Delaware Electric Cooperative
- EnergyUnited
- Farmers Electric Cooperative (Arkansas)
- Farmers Electric Cooperative (Texas)
- Fayette Electric Cooperative
- First Electric Cooperative
- Fox Islands Electric Cooperative
- Fort Belknap Electric Cooperative
- Grayson-Collin Electric Cooperative
- Great River Energy
- Greenbelt Electric Cooperative
- Jackson Electric Membership Corporation
- Kauaʻi Island Utility Cooperative
- KEM Electric Cooperative
- McKenzie Electric Cooperative
- McLean Electric Cooperative
- Minnkota Power Cooperative
- Mississippi County Electric Cooperative
- Mor-Gran-Sou Electric Cooperative
- Nodak Electric Cooperative
- North Arkansas Electric Cooperative
- North Central Electric Cooperative
- Northern Plains Electric Cooperative
- Oglethorpe Power
- Old Dominion Electric Cooperative
- Oliver-Mercer Electric Cooperative
- Ouachita Electric Cooperative
- Ozarks Electric Cooperative
- Palmetto Electric
- Pedernales Electric Cooperative
- Petit Jean Electric Cooperative
- PowerSouth Energy Cooperative
- Rich Mountain Electric Cooperative
- Sawnee EMC
- South Central Arkansas Electric Cooperative
- Southern Maryland Electric Cooperative
- Verendrye Electric Cooperative
- Wabash Valley Power Association
- West Florida Electric Cooperative
- Woodruff Electric Cooperative

== See also ==
- Rural Electrification Administration (REA)
- Touchstone Energy Cooperatives
- Willie Wiredhand
