= List of Arkansas companies =

The following notable companies are, or once were, headquartered in Arkansas.

== Companies based in Arkansas ==
=== A ===
- ABB Motors and Mechanical
- ABF Freight System
- Acxiom
- Alliance Rubber Company
- All Turtles
- Arkansas Business Publishing Group
- Arkansas Electric Cooperative Corporation
- Arkansas Valley Electric Cooperative
- ArcBest Corporation
- Arvest Bank

=== B ===
- Bank OZK

=== C ===
- C&L Electric Cooperative
- Carroll Electric Cooperative
- CenturyTel of Northwest Arkansas
- Clay County Electric Cooperative
- Craighead Electric Cooperative

=== D ===
- Daisy Outdoor Products
- Diamond Bear Brewing Company
- Dillard's

=== E ===
- Evolve Bank & Trust
- Explore Scientific

=== F ===
- Farmers Electric Cooperative (Arkansas)
- Field Agent
- First Electric Cooperative
- First National Bank of North Arkansas
- First Security Bank

=== H ===
- The Happy Egg Company
- Harps Food Stores
- Home BancShares

=== J ===
- J. B. Hunt

=== L ===
- Last Chance Records
- Leisure Arts
- Little Rock Port Authority Railroad
- Lost Roads Publishers

=== M ===
- Medallion Foods
- Mississippi County Electric Cooperative
- Mountain Valley Spring Water
- Murphy USA

=== N ===
- Nabholz Construction
- Noalmark Broadcasting Corporation
- North Arkansas Electric Cooperative

=== O ===
- Onterris
- Onyx Coffee Lab
- Ouachita Electric Cooperative
- Ozarks Electric Cooperative

=== P ===
- Petit Jean Electric Cooperative
- Polk Stanley Wilcox Architects

=== R ===
- Ranger Boats
- Remington Ammunition
- Reynolds-Davis Grocery Company
- Riceland Foods
- Rich Mountain Electric Cooperative
- Rose Law Firm

=== S ===
- Sam's Club
- Shake's Frozen Custard
- Simmons Bank
- Slim Chickens
- South Central Arkansas Electric Cooperative
- Southern Bancorp
- Stephens Inc.

=== T ===
- Thick Syrup Records
- Tyson Foods

=== W ===
- Walmart
- WEHCO Media
- Whole Hog Café
- Wilson Combat
- Windstream Holdings
- Wittenberg, Delony & Davidson
- Woodruff Electric Cooperative

=== Y ===
- Yarnell Ice Cream Co.

== Companies formerly based in Arkansas ==
=== A ===
- Affiliated Foods Southwest
- Alltel
- American Freightways
- AmTran
- Arkansas Southern Railroad (1892–1905)

=== C ===
- Climber Motor Company
- Command-Aire
- Cooks Venture

=== D ===
- DataRank
- Dierks Forests

=== E ===
- Equity Media Holdings

=== F ===
- FedEx

=== G ===
- Grapette

=== L ===
- Lion Oil
- LiveRamp

=== M ===
- Madison Guaranty
- MM Cohn
- Murfie
- Murphy Oil

=== O ===
- Ozan Lumber Company

=== S ===
- Stroud's Mercantile

=== U ===
- USA Drug

== See also ==
- List of companies of the United States by state
