= List of public utilities in Arkansas =

The following page lists all public utilities in the U.S. state of Arkansas.

== Electric utilities ==
Name	Type	Customers	Transmission (miles)	Founded
Arkansas Electric Cooperative Corporation	Cooperative	500,000	322	1949
Arkansas Valley Electric Cooperative	Cooperative			
Augusta Light & Power	Municipal			
Ashley-Chicot Electric Cooperative	Cooperative			
Benton Utilities	Municipal			
Bentonville Light & Water System	Municipal			
City of Paris Utilities	Municipal			
City of Siloam Springs	Municipal			
C&L Electric Cooperative	Cooperative			
Carroll Electric Cooperative	Cooperative			
Clarksville Light & Water Company	Municipal			
Clay County Electric Cooperative	Cooperative			
Conway Corporation	Municipal			
Craighead Electric Cooperative	Cooperative			
Empire District Electric Company	Investor owned	167,688	6,862	1909
Entergy Arkansas	Investor owned	696,000	15,700	1913
Farmers Electric Cooperative	Cooperative			
First Electric Cooperative	Cooperative	103,440	10,373	1937
Hope Water & Light Company	Municipal			
Jonesboro City Water & Light Company	Municipal			
Mississippi County Electric Cooperative	Cooperative			
North Arkansas Electric Cooperative	Cooperative			
North Little Rock Electric Department	Municipal			
Oklahoma Gas & Electric	Investor owned			
Osceola Municipal Light & Power	Municipal			1912
Ouachita Electric Cooperative	Cooperative			
Ozarks Electric Cooperative	Cooperative			
Paragould Light Water & Cable	Municipal			
Petit Jean Electric Cooperative	Cooperative			
Piggott Municipal Light, Water & Sewer	Municipal			
Prescott Water & Light Company	Municipal			
Rich Mountain Electric Cooperative	Cooperative			
South Central Arkansas Electric Cooperative	Cooperative			
Southwest Arkansas Electric Cooperative	Cooperative			
Southwestern Electric Power Company (SWEPCO)	Investor owned			
West Memphis Utility Commission	Municipal			
Woodruff Electric Cooperative	Cooperative			

== Water utilities ==
Name	Customers	City	Source
Acorn Rural Water Assn	1903	Mena, Arkansas	Surface purchased
ADC Cummins Unit	3800	Grady, Arkansas	Ground
ADC Tucker Unit	1500	Pine Bluff, Arkansas	Ground
ADC East Arkansas Regional	1536	Marianna, Arkansas	Ground
Airport Road Water Association	576	Lake Village, Arkansas	Ground purchased
Alicia Water System	157	Batesville, Arkansas	Ground purchased
Alma Waterworks	5745	Alma, Arkansas	Surface
Almyra Waterworks	406	Almyra, Arkansas	Ground
Alpena Waterworks	550	Alpena, Arkansas	Surface purchased
Alpine Water Association	740	Amity, Arkansas	Surface purchased
Altheimer Waterworks	918	Altheimer, Arkansas	Ground
Altus Waterworks	2043	Altus, Arkansas	Surface purchased
Amity Waterworks	772	Amity, Arkansas	Surface
Antoine Waterworks	618	Antoine, Arkansas	Ground
Ar Dept Of Correction Izard Co	800	Calico Rock, Arkansas	Ground
Arkadelphia Waterworks	10796	Arkadelphia, Arkansas	Surface
Arkansas City Waterworks	366	Arkansas City, Arkansas	Ground
Arkansas Health Center	1000	Benton, Arkansas	Surface
Arsenal Water System	2577	Pine Bluff, Arkansas	Ground
Ash Flat Water Company	1097	Ash Flat, Arkansas	Ground
Ashdown Waterworks	4723	Ashdown, Arkansas	Ground
Atkins Water System	4439	Atkins, Arkansas	Surface
Augusta Waterworks	2665	Augusta, Arkansas	Ground
Aurelle Water System	296	Strong, Arkansas	Ground purchased
Austin Waterworks	2436	Austin, Arkansas	Ground purchased & surface purchased
Autumn Acres Mhp	88	Gassville, Arkansas	Ground
Bald Knob North Water Assoc	2646	Bald Knob, Arkansas	Surface purchased
Bald Knob Waterworks	2897	Bald Knob, Arkansas	Surface purchased
Banks Waterworks	248	Banks, Arkansas	Ground
Barkada Water Association	381	Wilmar, Arkansas	Ground purchased
Barling Waterworks	4238	Barling, Arkansas	Surface purchased
Barton Lexa Water Association	4000	Barton, Arkansas	Ground
Basin Valley Water System	390	Marble Falls, Arkansas	Ground
Bassett Waterworks	173	Joiner, Arkansas	Ground
Batesville Water Utilities	11245	Batesville, Arkansas	Surface
Batts-Lapile Water Association	613	Strong, Arkansas	Ground
Bauxite Water	574	Bauxite, Arkansas	Surface purchased
Bay Waterworks	1801	Bay, Arkansas	Ground
Bearden Waterworks	2407	Bearden, Arkansas	Ground
Beaver Water District	52	Lowell, Arkansas	Surface
Beaverfork Volunteer Fire Department Water Service District	3097	Conway, Arkansas	Surface purchased
Bedford Falls Mhp	105	Green Forest, Arkansas	Ground
Bee Branch Water	3135	Bee Branch, Arkansas	Surface purchased
Beebe Waterworks	7898	Beebe, Arkansas	Ground & surface purchased
Beedeville Water Works	113	Beedeville, Arkansas	Ground
Bella Vista P.O.A.	26461	Bella Vista, Arkansas	Surface purchased
Bellefonte Water	455	Harrison, Arkansas	Ground
Belleville Water	1103	Belleville, Arkansas	Surface purchased
Ben Lomond Waterworks	156	Ben Lomond, Arkansas	Surface purchased
Benton Co Water	5217	Avoca, Arkansas	Surface purchased
Benton County Water Authority 4	520	Lowell, Arkansas	Surface purchased
Benton County Water Authority 5	1530	Rogers, Arkansas	Surface purchased
Benton Waterworks	30681	Benton, Arkansas	Surface
Bentonville Public Works Department	40137	Bentonville, Arkansas	Surface purchased
Benton-Washington Regional Public Water Authority	17	Rogers, Arkansas	Surface
Bergman Waterworks	2805	Bergman, Arkansas	Ground
Berryville Waterworks	5632	Berryville, Arkansas	Surface purchased
Bethesda Water Association	1302	Batesville, Arkansas	Surface purchased
Big Clifty Water	150	Eureka Springs, Arkansas	Ground
Big Flat Waterworks	523	Big Flat, Arkansas	Ground
Bigelow Waterworks	544	Perryville, Arkansas	Ground
Biggers Waterworks	378	Biggers, Arkansas	Ground
Birdsong Whitton Water Assoc	447	Tyronza, Arkansas	Ground
Biscoe Waterworks	380	Biscoe, Arkansas	Ground
Black Oak Waterworks	449	Lake City, Arkansas	Ground
Black Rock Waterworks	663	Black Rock, Arkansas	Ground
Blevins Waterworks	335	Blevins, Arkansas	Ground
Blue Mountain Waterworks	403	Blue Mountain, Arkansas	Surface purchased
Blytheville Waterworks	16413	Blytheville, Arkansas	Ground
Bodcaw Rural Water System	1203	Rosston, Arkansas	Ground purchased & surface purchased
Bois D'Arc Water System	50	Fulton, Arkansas	Ground
Bonanza Waterworks	575	Bonanza, Arkansas	Surface purchased
Bono Waterworks	1971	Bono, Arkansas	Ground & ground purchased
Booneville Development Center	275	Booneville, Arkansas	Surface
Booneville Waterworks	5892	Booneville, Arkansas	Surface
Bowser Water Assn	569	Monticello, Arkansas	Ground purchased
Boydell Water Association	133	Montrose, Arkansas	Ground
Bradford Waterworks	825	Bradford, Arkansas	Ground
Bradley Co Rural Water Assn	1099	Warren, Arkansas	Ground purchased
Bradley Waterworks	258	Bradley, Arkansas	Ground
Branch Water Works	480	Branch, Arkansas	Surface purchased
Breckenridge Union Water Association	1267	Newport, Arkansas	Ground
Briarcliff Waterworks	313	Mountain Home, Arkansas	Ground
Brinkley Waterworks	4200	Brinkley, Arkansas	Ground
Brookland Waterworks	2450	Brookland, Arkansas	Ground
Brunner Hill Water Assoc	1023	Dolph, Arkansas	Ground
Bryant Waterworks	19070	Bryant, Arkansas	Surface purchased
Buckner Waterworks	308	Buckner, Arkansas	Ground
Buena Vista-Ogemaw Water Association	468	Stephens, Arkansas	Surface purchased
Buffalo Island Reg Water Dist	3416	Monette, Arkansas	Ground
Bull Shoals Water System	2654	Bull Shoals, Arkansas	Surface purchased
Burdette Waterworks	597	Burdette, Arkansas	Ground
Cabot Waterworks	23776	Cabot, Arkansas	Ground (ground & surface) purchased
Caddo Valley Waterworks	635	Arkadelphia, Arkansas	Surface purchased
Caldwell Water	1280	Forrest City, Arkansas	Ground purchased
Calhoun County Water Assn	1553	Hampton, Arkansas	Ground
Calico Rock Waterworks	1840	Calico Rock, Arkansas	Ground & GWUDI
Calion Water Works	492	Calion, Arkansas	Ground
Camden Waterworks	13600	Camden, Arkansas	Surface
Camp Robinson	1500	North Little Rock, Arkansas	Surface purchased
Campbell Station Waterworks	240	Batesville, Arkansas	Ground purchased
Caraway Waterworks	1375	Caraway, Arkansas	Ground
Carlisle Waterworks	2313	Carlisle, Arkansas	Ground
Carroll-Boone Water District	12	Eureka Springs, Arkansas	Surface
Carthage Water And Sewer	338	Carthage, Arkansas	Ground
Casa Water Dept	1200	Casa, Arkansas	Surface purchased
Cash Waterworks	359	Cash, Arkansas	Ground purchased
Cave City Waterworks	2664	Cave City, Arkansas	Ground
Cave Springs Waterworks	3028	Cave Springs, Arkansas	Surface purchased
Cedarville Waterworks	8798	Cedarville, Arkansas	Surface purchased
Center Grove Water Association	4398	Sheridan, Arkansas	Ground
Centerton Waterworks	13235	Centerton, Arkansas	Surface purchased
Central Arkansas Water	313504	Little Rock, Arkansas	Surface
Central Logan County Pwfb	1230	Paris, Arkansas	Surface purchased
Central Public Water Authority	1218	Central City, Arkansas	Surface purchased
Charleston Waterworks	3423	Charleston, Arkansas	Surface
Cherokee Village Water Assoc	4717	Cherokee Village, Arkansas	Ground
Cherry Hill Public Facility Bd	864	Perryville, Arkansas	Surface purchased
Cherry Valley Waterworks	658	Cherry Valley, Arkansas	Ground
Chester Water Works	210	Chester, Arkansas	Surface purchased
Chicot Junction Water Assoc	779	Eudora, Arkansas	Ground purchased
Chidester Waterworks	534	Chidester, Arkansas	Ground
City Corporation	28616	Russellville, Arkansas	Surface
Clarendon Waterworks	1640	Clarendon, Arkansas	Ground
Clark Co Country Water Facilit	2450	Arkadelphia, Arkansas	Surface purchased
Clarkedale-Jericho Water Assoc	955	Proctor, Arkansas	Ground purchased
Clarksville Waterworks	9288	Clarksville, Arkansas	Surface
Clay Co Reg Water District	5880	McDougal, Arkansas	Ground & ground purchased
Cleveland Co Rural Water Users Assoc	1703	Rison, Arkansas	Ground & ground purchased
Clinton Waterworks	5684	Clinton, Arkansas	Surface
Coal Hill Waterworks	1300	Coal Hill, Arkansas	Surface purchased
Collins Water Association	264	Dermott, Arkansas	Ground
Colt Water Association	976	Colt, Arkansas	Ground
Community Water System	15646	Greers Ferry, Arkansas	Surface
Compton Waterworks	811	Compton, Arkansas	Ground purchased & surface purchased
Concord Water & Sewer Pfb	3020	Van Buren, Arkansas	Surface purchased
Conway Co Regional Water Dist	18943	Morrilton, Arkansas	Surface
Conway Water System	58908	Conway, Arkansas	Surface
Corinth Valley Water System	84	Warren, Arkansas	Ground purchased
Corning Waterworks	3377	Corning, Arkansas	Ground
Cotter Waterworks	980	Cotter, Arkansas	Ground & surface purchased
Cotton Plant Water Department	1025	Cotton Plant, Arkansas	Ground
Cottonshed Waterworks	72	Texarkana, Arkansas	Ground
Cottonwood Water Association	688	Harrison, Arkansas	Surface purchased
Cove Waterworks	625	Cove, Arkansas	Surface purchased
Coy Waterworks	256	Coy, Arkansas	Ground
Crawfordsville Waterworks	2032	Crawfordsville, Arkansas	Ground
Crestwood Mobile Home Park	34	Mountain Home, Arkansas	Ground
Cross County Rural Water System	9233	Hickory Ridge, Arkansas	Ground
Crossett Water Commission	8038	Crossett, Arkansas	Ground
Crowleys Ridge Water Assoc	3611	Harrisburg, Arkansas	Ground & ground purchased
Cushman Water System	1385	Cushman, Arkansas	Surface & surface purchased
Damascus Water Works	1850	Damascus, Arkansas	Surface purchased
Danville Waterworks	2567	Danville, Arkansas	Surface
Dardanelle Waterworks	4228	Dardanelle, Arkansas	GWUDI & surface purchased
Decatur Waterworks	2851	Decatur, Arkansas	Ground & surface purchased
Deer Run Water Company	117	Evening Shade, Arkansas	Ground
Deer Community Water Association	365	Deer, Arkansas	Surface purchased
Delaplaine Waterworks	146	McDougal, Arkansas	Ground purchased
Delight Waterworks	1495	Delight, Arkansas	Surface purchased
Dell Waterworks	1498	Dell, Arkansas	Ground purchased
Dennard Water Association	908	Dennard, Arkansas	Surface purchased
Denning Waterworks	588	Altus, Arkansas	Surface purchased
DeQueen Water Works	6594	DeQueen, Arkansas	Surface
Dermott Waterworks	2600	Dermott, Arkansas	Ground
Des Arc Waterworks	3882	Des Arc, Arkansas	Ground
DeValls Bluff Waterworks	615	DeValls Bluff, Arkansas	Ground
Dewitt Waterworks	3294	Dewitt, Arkansas	Ground
Diamond City Water	1203	Diamond City, Arkansas	Surface purchased
Diaz Waterworks	1092	Newport, Arkansas	Ground purchased
Dierks Water Works	1400	Dierks, Arkansas	Surface
Dogwood Water Association	1279	Blytheville, Arkansas	Ground
Dorcheat Water Association	1860	Taylor, Arkansas	Ground
Dota Public Water Authority	2650	Cord, Arkansas	GWUDI & ground purchased
Dover Waterworks	1587	Dover, Arkansas	Surface & surface purchased
Driver Grider Water Assoc	222	Osceola, Arkansas	Ground purchased
Dumas Waterworks	5847	Dumas, Arkansas	Ground
Dyer Waterworks	1023	Dyer, Arkansas	Surface purchased
Dyess Rural Water	294	Dyess, Arkansas	Ground purchased
Dyess Waterworks	430	Dyess, Arkansas	Ground
E Cass Water Supply Corp	133	Bivins, Texas	Ground & ground purchased
Earle Waterworks	1836	Earle, Arkansas	Ground
East End Water	5800	Little Rock, Arkansas	Ground
East Johnson County Water Association	4210	Lamar, Arkansas	Surface purchased
East Logan County Rural Water	1918	Paris, Arkansas	Surface purchased
East Monroe County Water Users	966	Brinkley, Arkansas	Ground purchased
East Newton County Water Association	1815	Vendor, Arkansas	Surface purchased
East Prairie Cnty Public Water Authority	699	Des Arc, Arkansas	Ground
Eastside Homeowners Association	201	Horseshoe Lake, Arkansas	Ground
Edgewood Bay Water	277	Lakeview, Arkansas	Ground & surface purchased
El Dorado Waterworks	18750	El Dorado, Arkansas	Ground
Elaine Waterworks	1673	Elaine, Arkansas	Ground
Elkins Water Department	2815	Elkins, Arkansas	Surface purchased
Emerson Waterworks	1158	Emerson, Arkansas	Ground
Emmet Waterworks	558	Emmet, Arkansas	Ground
England Waterworks	2823	England, Arkansas	Ground
Enon Water Association	467	Monticello, Arkansas	Ground purchased
Eudora Waterworks	1763	Eudora, Arkansas	Ground
Eureka Springs Waterworks	4058	Eureka Springs, Arkansas	Surface purchased
Evening Shade Waterworks	747	Evening Shade, Arkansas	Surface & ground purchased
Faircrest Water Association	1275	El Dorado, Arkansas	Ground
Fayetteville Utilities Department	91427	Fayetteville, Arkansas	Surface purchased
Fort Chaffee Maneuver Training Center Waterworks	500	Fort Chaffee	Surface purchased
Felsenthal Water And Sewer	620	Felsenthal, Arkansas	Ground
Fifty Six Waterworks	595	Fifty Six, Arkansas	Ground
Flippin Waterworks	3625	Flippin, Arkansas	Surface purchased
Fordyce Rural Water Association	1438	Fordyce, Arkansas	Ground purchased
Fordyce Water Department	4746	Fordyce, Arkansas	Ground
Foreman Waterworks	1173	Foreman, Arkansas	Surface purchased
Forrest City Waterworks	15220	Forrest City, Arkansas	Ground
Fort Smith Water Utilities	86209	Fort Smith, Arkansas	Surface
Fouke Waterworks	865	Fouke, Arkansas	Ground
Fountain Hill Waterworks	895	Fountain Hill, Arkansas	Ground
Four Mile Hill Water Association	4603	Searcy, Arkansas	Surface purchased
Franklin Waterworks	243	Franklin, Arkansas	Ground
Franklin-Sebatian Public Water Authority	0	Lavaca, Arkansas	Surface purchased
Free Hope Water Association	185	Magnolia, Arkansas	Ground purchased & surface purchased
Freedom Water Association	1785	Mena, Arkansas	Surface purchased
Frenchport Water Association	1669	Camden, Arkansas	Surface purchased
Fulton County Water Association	1781	Salem, Arkansas	Ground & ground purchased
Fulton Waterworks	365	Fulton, Arkansas	Ground
Furlow Water Association	2905	Cabot, Arkansas	Ground purchased
Garfield Waterworks	630	Garfield, Arkansas	Surface purchased
Garland Waterworks	342	Garland, Arkansas	Ground
Garrett Bridge Water Association	815	Dumas, Arkansas	Ground purchased
Gassville Waterworks	1618	Gassville, Arkansas	Ground & surface purchased
Gateway Public Water Authority	1890	Gateway, Arkansas	Surface purchased
Gentry Waterworks	5153	Gentry, Arkansas	Surface purchased
Gentryville Public Water Authority	386	Ash Flat, Arkansas	Ground
Gillett Water Department	670	Gillett, Arkansas	Ground
Gillham Regional Water District	3	Wickes, Arkansas	Surface
Gillham Waterworks	300	Gillham, Arkansas	Surface purchased
Gilmore Waterworks	258	Gilmore, Arkansas	Ground
Glen Acres	73	Eureka Springs, Arkansas	Ground
Glenwood Water Department	3023	Glenwood, Arkansas	Surface
Gosnell Water Association	4093	Gosnell, Arkansas	Ground
Gould Municipal Water-Sewer	1041	Gould, Arkansas	Ground
Grady Waterworks	424	Grady, Arkansas	Ground
Grand Prairie Bayou 2 Public Water Authority	10360	Austin, Arkansas	Ground & surface purchased
Grand Prairie Regional Water	13500	Stuttgart, Arkansas	Ground
Grange-Calamine Water Association	2381	Cave City, Arkansas	Ground & ground purchased
Grannis Waterworks	548	Grannis, Arkansas	Surface purchased
Grassy Knob Subordinate Sd	65	Eureka Springs, Arkansas	Surface purchased
Gravette Waterworks	3455	Gravette, Arkansas	Surface purchased
Gray Rock Water Association	738	Scranton, Arkansas	Surface purchased
Greasy Valley WPFB Logan Co.	495	Paris, Arkansas	Surface purchased
Green Forest Waterworks	5473	Green Forest, Arkansas	Surface purchased
Green Hill-Brooks Chapel Water	713	Monticello, Arkansas	Ground purchased
Greenbrier Waterworks	6590	Greenbrier, Arkansas	Surface purchased
Greenway Waterworks	322	Greenway, Arkansas	Ground
Greenwood Waterworks	8952	Greenwood, Arkansas	Surface
Grubbs Waterworks	907	Grubbs, Arkansas	Ground purchased
Guion Water Department	270	Guion, Arkansas	Surface purchased
Gum Springs Water Association	947	Arkadelphia, Arkansas	Surface purchased
Gurdon Waterworks	3215	Gurdon, Arkansas	Ground
Guy Waterworks	1702	Guy, Arkansas	Surface purchased
Hackett Waterworks	963	Hackett, Arkansas	Surface purchased
Hamburg Waterworks	5309	Hamburg, Arkansas	Ground
Hampton Waterworks	1695	Hampton, Arkansas	Ground
Hardin Water Association	4802	Pine Bluff, Arkansas	Ground purchased
Hardy Waterworks	915	Hardy, Arkansas	Ground
Harmony Grove Water Assoc	2303	East Camden, Arkansas	Ground purchased
Harmony Water Association	362	El Dorado, Arkansas	Ground purchased
Harrell Waterworks	305	Harrell, Arkansas	Ground
Harrisburg Waterworks	2288	Harrisburg, Arkansas	Ground
Harrison Waterworks	16905	Harrison, Arkansas	Surface purchased
Hartford Waterworks	655	Hartford, Arkansas	Surface purchased
Hartman Waterworks	1230	Hartman, Arkansas	Surface purchased
Haskell Water System	3990	Haskell, Arkansas	Ground & surface purchased
Hatfield Waterworks	776	Hatfield, Arkansas	Surface purchased
Havana Waterworks	1160	Havana, Arkansas	Surface purchased
Hazen Waterworks	1600	Hazen, Arkansas	Ground
Heafer-Black Oak Water Association	481	Marion, Arkansas	Ground purchased
Heber Springs Water System	11131	Heber Springs, Arkansas	Surface
Helena Water & Sewer Department	5500	Helena-West Helena, Arkansas	Ground
Hermitage Waterworks	689	Hermitage, Arkansas	Ground
Hickory Ridge Waterworks	272	Hickory Ridge, Arkansas	Ground
Highfill Water Department	1586	Highfill, Arkansas	Surface purchased
Highland Public Water Authority	2394	Hardy, Arkansas	Ground & ground purchased
Holiday Island Waterworks	3326	Holiday Island, Arkansas	Ground
Holly Grove Waterworks	1010	Holly Grove, Arkansas	Ground
Hope Water & Light Commission	11500	Hope, Arkansas	Ground & surface
Horatio Waterworks	1529	Horatio, Arkansas	Ground
Horsehead Water Association	4940	Clarksville, Arkansas	Surface purchased
Horseshoe Bend Waterworks	2131	Horseshoe Bend, Arkansas	Ground
Horseshoe Lake Utilities	734	Horseshoe Lake, Arkansas	Ground
Hosanna Heights Water	39	Mammoth Spring, Arkansas	Ground
Hot Spring County Water Association	3395	Donaldson, Arkansas	Surface purchased
Hot Springs Utilities	92010	Hot Springs, Arkansas	Surface
Hot Springs Village Water	13500	Hot Springs Village, Arkansas	Surface
Houston Waterworks	611	Perryville, Arkansas	Surface purchased
Hoxie Water Department	2650	Hoxie, Arkansas	Surface purchased
Hughes Community Water Assoc	2226	Hughes, Arkansas	Ground
Hughes Waterworks	1441	Hughes, Arkansas	Ground
Humnoke Waterworks	331	Humnoke, Arkansas	Ground purchased
Humphrey Waterworks	557	Humphrey, Arkansas	Ground
Huntington Waterworks	618	Huntington, Arkansas	Surface purchased
Huntsville Waterworks	2358	Huntsville, Arkansas	Surface purchased
Huttig Waterworks	777	Huttig, Arkansas	Ground
Hwy 4 24 Water Association	2507	Chidester, Arkansas	Surface purchased
Hwy 63 Water Association	7343	Rison, Arkansas	Ground
Hwy 64 Water Association	228	Marion, Arkansas	Ground purchased
Hwy 71 Water District #1 Public Water Authority	6190	Alma, Arkansas	Surface purchased
Hwy 82 Water Association	123	El Dorado, Arkansas	Ground
Hwy 9 Water Association	1285	Malvern, Arkansas	Surface purchased
Imboden Waterworks	677	Imboden, Arkansas	Ground
Independence Jackson Regional	2933	Newport, Arkansas	Ground
Indian Switch Rural Water Association	730	Eudora, Arkansas	Ground purchased
Jacksonport Waterworks	238	Jacksonport, Arkansas	Ground purchased
Jacksonville Waterworks	28364	Jacksonville, Arkansas	Ground & surface purchased
James Fork Regional Water	11384	Greenwood, Arkansas	Surface
Jasper Waterworks	766	Jasper, Arkansas	Surface purchased
Jefferson-Samples-Dexter Water	2852	Jefferson, Arkansas	Ground
Johnson Township Water Association	813	El Dorado, Arkansas	Ground
Joiner Waterworks	553	Osceola, Arkansas	Ground
Jonesboro City Water & Light	70066	Jonesboro, Arkansas	Ground
Judsonia Waterworks	3028	Judsonia, Arkansas	Surface purchased
Junction City Waterworks	760	Junction City, Arkansas	Ground
Keiser Waterworks	747	Manila, Arkansas	Ground
Kelso-Rohwer Water Association	555	El Dorado, Arkansas	Ground
Kensett Waterworks	1425	Kensett, Arkansas	Surface purchased
Keo Water Works	275	Wright, Arkansas	Ground
Kibler Water System	1755	Van Buren, Arkansas	Surface purchased
Kimzey Regional Water District	11290	Malvern, Arkansas	Surface
Kings Hill Estates	25	Berryville, Arkansas	Ground
Kingsland Waterworks	595	Kingsland, Arkansas	Ground
Kingwood Mhp	62	Mountain Home, Arkansas	Ground
Knobel Waterworks	294	Knobel, Arkansas	Ground
Knoxville Waterworks	1810	Knoxville, Arkansas	Surface purchased
Krooked Kreek Water Assn	2000	Harrison, Arkansas	Ground
Lacey-Ladelle Water Association	1315	Monticello, Arkansas	Ground purchased
Ladd Water Association	2393	Pine Bluff, Arkansas	Ground
Lafe Regional Water Distribution District	2478	Marmaduke, Arkansas	Ground
Lake Bull Shoals Estates Water	54	Lead Hill, Arkansas	Surface purchased
Lake Chicot Water Association	2038	Lake Village, Arkansas	Ground purchased
Lake City Waterworks	2329	Lake City, Arkansas	Ground
Lake Forest Subordinate Dist	120	Eureka Springs, Arkansas	Ground
Lake Lucerne Estates	55	Eureka Springs, Arkansas	Ground
Lake Table Rock Estates	33	Harrison, Arkansas	Ground
Lake View Municipal Water	638	Helena, Arkansas	Ground
Lake Village Waterworks	2543	Lake Village, Arkansas	Ground
Lakeshore Estates Water Assn	644	Marion, Arkansas	Ground purchased
Lakeside Water Association	1987	Waldo, Arkansas	Ground purchased & surface purchased
Lakeview Midway Public Water Authority	3012	Lakeview, Arkansas	Surface purchased
Lamar Waterworks	1885	Lamar, Arkansas	Surface purchased
Laurelwood Homeowners Association	90	Henderson, Arkansas	Ground
Lavaca Waterworks	3428	Lavaca, Arkansas	Surface purchased
Lawrence Co Reg Water Dist	6894	Portia, Arkansas	Ground (ground & surface) purchased
Lawson-Urbana Water Assoc	1147	Lawson, Arkansas	Ground
Leachville Waterworks	2021	Leachville, Arkansas	Ground
Lead Hill Waterworks	515	Lead Hill, Arkansas	Surface purchased
Leatherwood View Estates	40	Marble Falls, Arkansas	Ground
Lee County Water Association	4760	Marianna, Arkansas	Ground purchased
Leisure Hills Mobile Home Park	117	Springdale, Arkansas	Ground
Leola Waterworks	720	Leola, Arkansas	Ground
Lepanto Waterworks	1893	Lepanto, Arkansas	Ground
Leslie Water System	740	Leslie, Arkansas	Surface purchased
Lewisville Waterworks	1448	Lewisville, Arkansas	Ground
Liberty Utilities	48668	Pine Bluff, Arkansas	Ground
Lincoln Water Department	6209	Lincoln, Arkansas	Surface purchased
Lisbon Water Association	422	El Dorado, Arkansas	Ground purchased
Little Creek Water Association	2159	Sheridan, Arkansas	Ground
Little Portion Hermitage	25	Berryville, Arkansas	Ground
Little River Co Rda	4279	Foreman, Arkansas	Surface
Little River Country Club	393	DeQueen, Arkansas	Ground
Little River Water Association	816	Osceola, Arkansas	Ground
Locke-Fern Dollard Rd Ww Pfb	1208	Mountainburg, Arkansas	Surface purchased
Lockesburg Waterworks	725	Lockesburg, Arkansas	Ground
Locust Bayou Water Association	520	Camden, Arkansas	Ground purchased
London Waterworks	1220	London, Arkansas	Surface purchased
Long Lake Water Association	500	Helena, Arkansas	Ground purchased
Lonoke Waterworks	4245	Lonoke, Arkansas	Ground
Lonoke White Public Water Auth	2	Quitman, Arkansas	Surface
Lost Bridge Vill Wat-Sew Dists	995	Garfield, Arkansas	Ground
Louann Waterworks	192	El Dorado, Arkansas	Ground
Ludwig Water Association	1322	Clarksville, Arkansas	Surface purchased
Lurton-Pelsor Water Assoc	289	Pelsor, Arkansas	Ground
Luxora Waterworks	1178	Luxora, Arkansas	Ground
Lydesdale Water Association	390	Magnolia, Arkansas	Ground purchased & surface purchased
Lynn Waterworks	704	Lynn, Arkansas	Ground
Madison County Regional Water District	3	Rogers, Arkansas	Surface
Madison County Water Facilities Board	9318	Huntsville, Arkansas	Surface purchased
Magazine Waterworks	1038	Magazine, Arkansas	Surface purchased
Magness Water Association	470	Magness, Arkansas	Ground purchased
Magnet-Butterfield Water Authority	1838	Malvern, Arkansas	Surface purchased
Magnolia Waterworks	10866	Magnolia, Arkansas	Ground & surface
Malvern Waterworks	10318	Malvern, Arkansas	Surface
Mammoth Spring Waterworks	1442	Mammoth Spring, Arkansas	Ground
Manila Waterworks	3336	Manila, Arkansas	Ground
Mansfield Waterworks	2340	Mansfield, Arkansas	Surface purchased
Marianna Waterworks	4115	Marianna, Arkansas	Ground
Marie Water System	140	Wilson, Arkansas	Ground purchased
Marion County Reg Water Dist	2	Bull Shoals, Arkansas	Surface
Marion Waterworks	12345	Marion, Arkansas	Ground
Marked Tree Waterworks	2566	Marked Tree, Arkansas	Ground
Marmaduke Waterworks	1042	Marmaduke, Arkansas	Ground
Marshall Waterworks	2304	Marshall, Arkansas	Surface purchased
Marvell Rural Water Assoc	1800	Marvell, Arkansas	Ground & ground purchased
Marvell Waterworks	1187	Marvell, Arkansas	Ground
Marysville Water Association	738	Mount Holly, Arkansas	Ground
Maumelle Water Corporation	2771	Roland, Arkansas	Ground
Maumelle Water Management merged with CAW	20115	Maumelle, Arkansas	Ground
Mayflower Waterworks	7416	Mayflower, Arkansas	Surface purchased
Maynard Waterworks	470	Maynard, Arkansas	Ground
McCrory Water and Sewer Department	1850	McCrory, Arkansas	Ground
McDougal Waterworks	251	McDougal, Arkansas	Ground
McNeil Rural Water Assoc	894	McNeil, Arkansas	Ground
McNeil Waterworks	522	McNeil, Arkansas	Ground
McRae Waterworks	916	McRae, Arkansas	Ground
McGehee Waterworks	4386	McGehee, Arkansas	Ground
Melbourne Waterworks	4128	Melbourne, Arkansas	Ground
Mena Water Dept	7777	Mena, Arkansas	Surface
Menifee Water Department	435	Menifee, Arkansas	Surface purchased
Mid-Arkansas Utilities Pwa	11148	Cabot, Arkansas	Surface purchased
Midway Water Association	2100	Proctor, Arkansas	Ground
Mill Pond Village Mhp	160	Royal, Arkansas	Ground
Miller County Public Water Authority	355	Texarkana, Arkansas	Surface purchased
Milltown-Washburn Water Users	3628	Greenwood, Arkansas	Surface purchased
Millwood Water Corporation	487	Ashdown, Arkansas	Ground
Mineral Springs Waterworks	1208	Mineral Springs, Arkansas	Ground
Mitchellville Waterworks	496	Dumas, Arkansas	Ground
Mockingbird Hill Water Assoc	717	Jasper, Arkansas	Surface purchased
Monette Waterworks	1316	Monette, Arkansas	Ground
Montgomery Co Regional Pwa	3	Mount Ida, Arkansas	Surface
Monticello Water Department	10568	Monticello, Arkansas	Ground
Montrose Waterworks	391	Montrose, Arkansas	Ground purchased
Morning Star Water Association	1260	Marshall, Arkansas	Surface purchased
Moro Waterworks	216	Moro, Arkansas	Ground purchased
Morrison Bluff Water System	325	Scranton, Arkansas	Surface purchased
Mount Holly Waterworks	384	Mount Holly, Arkansas	Ground
Mount Ida Waterworks	3008	Mt Ida, Arkansas	Surface purchased
Mount Olive Water Association	5400	Elkins, Arkansas	Surface purchased
Mountain Home Waterworks	16079	Mountain Home, Arkansas	Surface
Mountain Pine Waterworks	795	Mountain Pine, Arkansas	Surface purchased
Mountain Top Water Association	6355	Heber Springs, Arkansas	Surface purchased
Mountain View Waterworks	7178	Mountain View, Arkansas	Surface
Mountainburg Water And Sewer	990	Mountainburg, Arkansas	Surface purchased
Mt Pleasant Waterworks	1353	Mount Pleasant, Arkansas	Ground & GWUDI
Mt Sherman Water Association	855	Jasper, Arkansas	Surface purchased
Mulberry Waterworks	1603	Mulberry, Arkansas	Surface
Mundell Heights Waterworks	188	Eureka Springs, Arkansas	Ground
Murfreesboro Waterworks	1641	Murfreesboro, Arkansas	Surface
N E White County Public Facilities Board	0	Searcy, Arkansas	Surface purchased
N Garland Co Reg Water Dist	6455	Hot Springs, Arkansas	Surface
Nail-Swain Water Association	604	Deer, Arkansas	Surface purchased
Nashville Rural Water Assoc	6958	Nashville, Arkansas	Surface purchased
Nashville Waterworks	4627	Nashville, Arkansas	Surface
Ne Mississippi Co Water Assoc	1151	Blytheville, Arkansas	Ground purchased
Ne Yell County Water Assoc	5955	Dardanelle, Arkansas	Surface purchased
Neapwa	5	Pocahontas, Arkansas	Surface
New Hope Water Association	1159	Emerson, Arkansas	Ground
New London Water Association	772	Strong, Arkansas	Ground
Newark Waterworks	1415	Newark, Arkansas	Ground
Newport Waterworks	6583	Newport, Arkansas	Ground
Norfork Waterworks	1192	Norfork, Arkansas	Ground
Norman Waterworks	850	Norman, Arkansas	Surface purchased
Norphlet Waterworks	1153	Norphlet, Arkansas	Ground
North Carbon City Water Assoc	113	Paris, Arkansas	Surface purchased
North Crossett Utilities	3525	Crossett, Arkansas	Ground
North East Crossett Water Assn	160	Crossett, Arkansas	Ground purchased
North East Public Water Auth	3811	Mountain Home, Arkansas	Surface purchased
North Howard Rural Water Association	964	Umpire, Arkansas	Surface purchased
North Jackson Co Water Assn	780	Tuckerman, Arkansas	Ground purchased
North Lagrue Water Assoc	299	Dewitt, Arkansas	Ground purchased
North Pike Co Rural Water Assn	1976	Kirby, Arkansas	Surface purchased
North White Co Rural Water Pfb	5300	Judsonia, Arkansas	Surface purchased
Northeast Dewitt Water Assoc	677	Dewitt, Arkansas	Ground purchased
Northern Ohio Water Assoc	663	Tyronza, Arkansas	Ground purchased
Oak Grove Water	465	Oak Grove, Arkansas	Ground
Oak Grove Water Association	2612	Van Buren, Arkansas	Surface purchased
Oak Manor Water Association	338	El Dorado, Arkansas	Ground purchased
Oak Hills Suburban Improvement District	111	Bentonville, Arkansas	Surface purchased
Oden- Pencil Bluff Water Assn.	383	Oden, Arkansas	Surface purchased
Ogden Waterworks	495	Ogden, Arkansas	Ground
Oil Trough Waterworks	284	Oil Trough, Arkansas	Ground & ground purchased
O'Kean Waterworks	228	McDougal, Arkansas	Ground purchased
Okolona Waterworks	590	Okolona, Arkansas	Ground
Ola Waterworks	1117	Ola, Arkansas	Surface
Old Bella Vista Poa	108	Bella Vista, Arkansas	Surface purchased
Old Union Water Association	1233	El Dorado, Arkansas	Ground & ground purchased
Omaha Waterworks	1163	Omaha, Arkansas	Ground
Oppelo Water Department	1300	Oppelo, Arkansas	Surface purchased
Osage Point Mhp	68	Berryville, Arkansas	Ground
Osceola Waterworks	7176	Osceola, Arkansas	Ground
Outside Kingsland Water Assoc	538	Kingsland, Arkansas	Ground
Oxford Waterworks	1074	Oxford, Arkansas	Ground
Ozan Creek Rural Water System	675	Blevins, Arkansas	Ground purchased & surface purchased
Ozan Waterworks	378	Ozan, Arkansas	Ground
Ozark Acres Water Association	819	Hardy, Arkansas	Ground
Ozark Mtn Regional Pwa	0	Diamond City, Arkansas	Surface
Ozark Waterworks	4288	Ozark, Arkansas	Surface
Palestine Water Association	1855	Palestine, Arkansas	Ground purchased
Pangburn Waterworks	2697	Pangburn, Arkansas	Surface
Paragould, Light, Water, & Cable	24121	Paragould, Arkansas	Ground
Paris Waterworks	5123	Paris, Arkansas	Surface
Parkdale Waterworks	288	Parkdale, Arkansas	Ground
Parkers Chapel Public Water	2369	El Dorado, Arkansas	Ground
Parkin Rural Water Association	406	Earle, Arkansas	Ground purchased
Parkin Waterworks	988	Parkin, Arkansas	Ground
Paron-Owensville Water Auth	2071	Paron, Arkansas	Surface purchased
Parthenon Water Association	400	Jasper, Arkansas	Surface purchased
City of Patterson	491	Patterson, Arkansas	Ground
Pea Ridge Waterworks	5595	Pea Ridge, Arkansas	Surface purchased
Peach Orchard Waterworks	163	McDougal, Arkansas	Ground purchased
Pendleton-Pea Ridge Water Assn	988	Dumas, Arkansas	Ground purchased
Perla Water Association	1900	Malvern, Arkansas	Surface purchased
Perry Water System	658	Perry, Arkansas	Surface purchased
Perrytown Waterworks	130	Hope, Arkansas	Ground
Perryville Waterworks	2112	Perryville, Arkansas	Surface
Pfeiffer Water Authority	3241	Batesville, Arkansas	Surface purchased
Pickens Waterworks	84	Pickens, Arkansas	Ground
Piggott Waterworks	4251	Piggott, Arkansas	Ground
Pike City Water Assn	321	Murfreesboro, Arkansas	Surface purchased
Pleasant Grove	2202	Pleasant Grove, Arkansas	Surface purchased
Pleasant View Water Fac Board	1673	Mulberry, Arkansas	Surface purchased
Plumerville Waterworks	820	Plumerville, Arkansas	Surface purchased
Pocahontas Waterworks	7547	Pocahontas, Arkansas	Surface
Pollard Waterworks	287	Pollard, Arkansas	Ground
Portia Waterworks	558	Portia, Arkansas	Surface purchased
Portland Waterworks	617	Portland, Arkansas	Ground
Pottsville Water Association	4108	Pottsville, Arkansas	Surface purchased
Poyen Waterworks	755	Poyen, Arkansas	Surface purchased
Prairie Grove Water Department	5414	Prairie Grove, Arkansas	Surface & surface purchased
Prattsville Waterworks	1282	Prattsville, Arkansas	Ground
Prescott Waterworks	5198	Prescott, Arkansas	Surface
Pyatt Waterworks	225	Pyatt, Arkansas	Ground
Quinn Water Association	751	El Dorado, Arkansas	Ground purchased
Quitman Waterworks	1062	Quitman, Arkansas	Surface purchased
Rambo Water District #1 Inc	90	Rogers, Arkansas	Ground
Ratcliff Waterworks	1350	Ratcliff, Arkansas	Surface purchased
Ravenden Springs Waterworks	143	Ravenden Springs, Arkansas	Ground
Ravenden Waterworks	470	Ravenden, Arkansas	Ground
Readland-Grandlake Water Assoc	223	Eudora, Arkansas	Ground purchased
Rector Waterworks	2312	Rector, Arkansas	Ground
Redfield Waterworks	2667	Redfield, Arkansas	Ground
Redhill Water Association	475	Alma, Arkansas	Surface purchased
Reed Waterworks	252	Tillar, Arkansas	Ground purchased
Reyno Waterworks	445	Reyno, Arkansas	Ground
Richwoods Water Association	1397	Mountain View, Arkansas	Surface purchased
Ridgefield Estates	150	Little Rock, Arkansas	Surface purchased
Rison Waterworks	1344	Rison, Arkansas	Ground
River Valley Water Assn	1126	Arkadelphia, Arkansas	Surface purchased
Riversouth Rural Water Dist	4053	Ozark, Arkansas	Surface purchased
Riviera Utilities	1800	Hot Springs, Arkansas	Surface purchased
Rock Moore Water Authority	3087	Sulphur Rock, Arkansas	Ground
Roe Waterworks	124	Roe, Arkansas	Ground
Rogers Water Utilities	64379	Rogers, Arkansas	Surface purchased
Rosston Water Department	620	Rosston, Arkansas	Ground
Russell Waterworks	360	Russell, Arkansas	Ground
Russellville- Rwpsid2Inc	145	Russellville, Arkansas	Surface purchased
S P G Water Association	1420	St Joe, Arkansas	Surface purchased
Salem Water Association	14200	Benton, Arkansas	Surface purchased
Salem Waterworks	1505	Salem, Arkansas	Ground & ground purchased
Salesville Waterworks	567	Salesville, Arkansas	Ground
Saline Co Ww Ss Pfb	1949	Alexander, Arkansas	Ground
Sandridge-Bardstown Wtr Assoc	153	Bassett, Arkansas	Ground purchased
Sardis Water Association	13344	Mabelvale, Arkansas	Ground
Scranton Waterworks	1485	Scranton, Arkansas	Surface purchased
Sdm Water Association	373	Marshall, Arkansas	Surface purchased
Se Bradley Co Water Assn	2614	Hermitage, Arkansas	Ground
Se White County Water Assoc	5055	Higginson, Arkansas	Surface purchased
Searcy Waterworks	23768	Searcy, Arkansas	Surface
Sebastian Lake Public Water Authority	250	Greenwood, Arkansas	Surface purchased
Sedgwick Waterworks	209	Sedgwick, Arkansas	Ground purchased
Selma Water Association	1035	Monticello, Arkansas	Ground purchased
Sevier Co Water Association	4293	DeQueen, Arkansas	Surface
Shady Acres Mobile Home Park	60	Texarkana, Arkansas	Ground
Shannon Hills Water Dept	3443	Shannon Hills, Arkansas	Surface purchased
Sheridan Waterworks	3505	Sheridan, Arkansas	Ground
Shirley Waterworks	374	Shirley, Arkansas	Surface purchased
Shumaker Public Service Co	1413	East Camden, Arkansas	Ground
Sidney Water System	306	Sidney, Arkansas	Ground
Siloam Springs Waterworks	16577	Siloam Springs, Arkansas	Surface
Smackover Waterworks	3104	Smackover, Arkansas	Ground
South Logan County Water	1540	Booneville, Arkansas	Surface purchased
South Mountain Water Assn	669	Marshall, Arkansas	Surface purchased
South Pike Co. Water	485	Murfreesboro, Arkansas	Surface purchased
South Sheridan Water Assoc	3132	Sheridan, Arkansas	Ground
Southern Hills Water System	45	Berryville, Arkansas	Ground
Southside Pub Water Authority	9000	Batesville, Arkansas	Surface
Southwest Arkansas Water Syst	1698	Hope, Arkansas	Ground
Southwest Water Association	7140	Benton, Arkansas	Surface purchased
Spadra-Goose Camp Water Assoc	510	Clarksville, Arkansas	Surface purchased
Sparkman Waterworks	1325	Sparkman, Arkansas	Surface purchased
Springdale Water Utilities	84147	Springdale, Arkansas	Surface purchased
St Charles Waterworks	379	St. Charles, Arkansas	Ground
St Francis River Reg Water Dd	2482	Paragould, Arkansas	Ground & ground purchased
St Francis Rural Water Assoc	1386	Forrest City, Arkansas	Ground purchased
St Francis Water System	235	Piggott, Arkansas	Ground
Stamps Waterworks	2268	Stamps, Arkansas	Ground
Star City Water Waterworks	2842	Star City, Arkansas	Ground
Starlight Estates	42	Mt. Home, Arkansas	Ground
Stephens Waterworks	1259	Stephens, Arkansas	Ground
Strawberry Waterworks	954	Strawberry, Arkansas	Ground
Strong Waterworks	899	Strong, Arkansas	Ground
Stuttgart Waterworks	9745	Stuttgart, Arkansas	Ground
Subiaco Academy Waterworks	250	Subiaco, Arkansas	Surface
Subiaco City Waterworks	477	Subiaco, Arkansas	Surface purchased
Success Waterworks	105	Success, Arkansas	Ground purchased
Sulphur Springs Waterworks	682	Sulphur Springs, Arkansas	Ground
Summit Waterworks	604	Summit, Arkansas	Surface purchased
Sunset Water Association	661	Sunset, Arkansas	Ground purchased
Sw Boone County Water Assoc	3953	Harrison, Arkansas	Ground & surface purchased
Sw Warren Water Association	759	Warren, Arkansas	Ground purchased
Sw White County Water Assn	9816	Searcy, Arkansas	Surface purchased
Swifton Waterworks	778	Swifton, Arkansas	Ground
Sylamore Valley Water Assn	270	Fifty Six, Arkansas	Surface purchased
Sylvan Shores Sd Waterworks	85	Eureka Springs, Arkansas	Ground
Tall Oaks Mhp	17	Mountain Home, Arkansas	Ground
Tanksley Apartments	52	Berryville, Arkansas	Ground
Taylor Waterworks	655	Taylor, Arkansas	Ground & ground purchased
Texarkana Water Utilities	32097	Texarkana, Arkansas	Surface
Thornton Waterworks	917	Thornton, Arkansas	Ground
Tillar Waterworks	225	Tillar, Arkansas	Ground
Toad Suck Public Facility Bd	1314	Morrilton, Arkansas	Surface purchased
Tollette Water	339	Mineral Springs, Arkansas	Ground
Tontitown Water Utilities	2270	Tontitown, Arkansas	Surface purchased
Tri County Rwdd -Moores Chapel	2620	Russellville, Arkansas	Surface purchased
Tri-County Water Distbr Dist	16671	Russellville, Arkansas	Surface & surface purchased
Trumann Rural Water Assoc	2614	Trumann, Arkansas	Ground & ground purchased
Trumann Waterworks	7968	Trumann, Arkansas	Ground
Tuckerman Waterworks	1774	Tuckerman, Arkansas	Ground
Tulip - Princeton Water Assn	1053	Carthage, Arkansas	Ground
Tull Water	1987	Malvern, Arkansas	Surface purchased
Tumbling Shoals Water Assoc	4890	Tumbling Shoals, Arkansas	Surface purchased
Turrell Water Works	625	Turrell, Arkansas	Ground
Twin Oaks Mobile Home Park	35	Flippin, Arkansas	Ground
Tyronza Waterworks	852	Tyronza, Arkansas	Ground
Ulm Waterworks	206	Ulm, Arkansas	Ground purchased
United Water Association	568	Brinkley, Arkansas	Ground purchased
Us Air Force Base Little Rock	8618	Little Rock Air Force Base	Ground purchased & surface purchased
Valley Springs Waterworks	3120	Valley Springs, Arkansas	Surface purchased
Van Buren County W U A	3062	Clinton, Arkansas	Surface purchased
Van Buren Waterworks	22435	Van Buren, Arkansas	Surface purchased
Vandervoort Waterworks	685	Vandervoort, Arkansas	Surface purchased
Vanndale-Birdeye Water Assoc	2312	Cherry Valley, Arkansas	Ground
Victoria Water Association	35	Victoria, Arkansas	Ground
Village Water Association	417	Waldo, Arkansas	Ground
Vilonia Waterworks	23177	Vilonia, Arkansas	Surface purchased
Viola Waterworks	387	Viola, Arkansas	Ground
Wabbaseka Waterworks	352	Wabbaseka, Arkansas	Ground
Waldenburg Water Association	215	Weiner, Arkansas	Ground purchased
Waldo Waterworks	1372	Waldo, Arkansas	Ground
Waldron Waterworks	4077	Waldron, Arkansas	Surface
Walker Creek Stateline Rwa	1335	Taylor, Arkansas	Ground & surface purchased
Walker Water Association	1183	Magnolia, Arkansas	Ground & surface purchased
Walkerville Water Association	535	Emerson, Arkansas	Ground
Walnut Hill Water Association	275	Bradley, Arkansas	Ground purchased
Walnut Ridge Waterworks	4890	Walnut Ridge, Arkansas	Surface purchased
Ward Waterworks	9500	Ward, Arkansas	Ground (ground & surface) purchased
Warren Waterworks	6910	Warren, Arkansas	Ground
Washington Water Authority	15734	Farmington, Arkansas	Surface purchased
Washington Water System	355	Washington, Arkansas	Ground
Watalula Water Association	2282	Ozark, Arkansas	Surface purchased
Watson Chapel Water Assoc	6140	Pine Bluff, Arkansas	Ground
Watson Waterworks	321	Watson, Arkansas	Ground
Weiner Waterworks	716	Weiner, Arkansas	Ground
Wesson-Newell Water Assoc	590	El Dorado, Arkansas	Ground
West Ashley County Water Assn	683	Crossett, Arkansas	Ground purchased
West Fork Water and Wastewater Utility	3237	West Fork, Arkansas	Surface purchased
West Helena Water Works	7500	West Helena, Arkansas	Ground
West Memphis Waterworks	28000	West Memphis, Arkansas	Ground
West Saline Water Users Assn	1959	New Edinburg, Arkansas	Ground
West Stone County Water Assn	4634	Fox, Arkansas	Surface purchased
West Woodruff Water District	376	Patterson, Arkansas	Ground purchased
Western Greene County Rural Water District	6394	Walcott, Arkansas	Ground
Western Grove Municipal Water	888	Western Grove, Arkansas	Surface purchased
Wheatley Waterworks	447	Wheatley, Arkansas	Ground purchased
Whelen Springs Water Department	500	Gurdon, Arkansas	Ground purchased
Wickes Waterworks	1303	Wickes, Arkansas	Surface purchased
Widener Waterworks	692	Widener, Arkansas	Ground purchased
Wiederkehr Village Water Dept	77	Ozark, Arkansas	Surface purchased
Wilburn Water Association	739	Heber Springs, Arkansas	Ground
Wildwood Water Association	1280	El Dorado, Arkansas	Ground purchased
Williford Waterworks	105	Williford, Arkansas	Ground
Willisville Waterworks	448	Willisville, Arkansas	Ground
Wilmar Waterworks	857	Wilmar, Arkansas	Ground
Wilmot Waterworks	862	Wilmot, Arkansas	Ground
Wilson Water System	1101	Wilson, Arkansas	Ground
Wilton Waterworks	374	Wilton, Arkansas	Ground
Winchester Waterworks	444	Winchester, Arkansas	Ground
Winslow Water Department	1590	Winslow, Arkansas	Surface purchased
Winthrop Water Association	410	Winthrop, Arkansas	Surface purchased
Wire Road Water System	822	Stephens, Arkansas	Surface purchased
Wkmm Rural Water Association	388	Mcgehee, Arkansas	Ground purchased
Woodson-Hensley Water Company	1000	Hensley, Arkansas	Ground
Wooster Waterworks	3700	Wooster, Arkansas	Surface purchased
Wright-Pastoria Water Assoc	1268	Wright, Arkansas	Ground
Wye Mountain Water Association	1350	Roland, Arkansas	Surface purchased
Wynne Water Utilities	8837	Wynne, Arkansas	Ground
Yarbro Waterworks	388	Blytheville, Arkansas	Ground
Yellville Waterworks	2322	Yellville, Arkansas	Surface purchased
Yorktown Water Association	8169	Star City, Arkansas	Ground

== See also ==
- List of power stations in Arkansas
- Energy in Arkansas
