= List of power stations in Arkansas =

Sources of Arkansas utility-scale electricity generation in gigawatt-hours, full-year 2025:
1. Natural gas: 22,038 (33.2%)
2. Coal: 20,380 (30.7%)
3. Nuclear: 15,193 (22.9%)
4. Solar: 4,615 (6.95%)
5. Hydroelectric: 3,186 (4.80%)
6. Biomass: 849 (1.28%)
7. Wind: 176 (0.26%)

This is a list of electricity-generating power stations in the U.S. state of Arkansas, separated by fuel type.

In 2024, Arkansas had a summer capacity of 15.9 gigawatts, and a net generation of 61,542 gigawatt-hours. In 2025, the electrical energy generation mix was 33.2% natural gas, 30.7% coal, 22.9% nuclear, 7% solar, 4.8% hydroelectric, 1.3% biomass, and 0.3% wind.

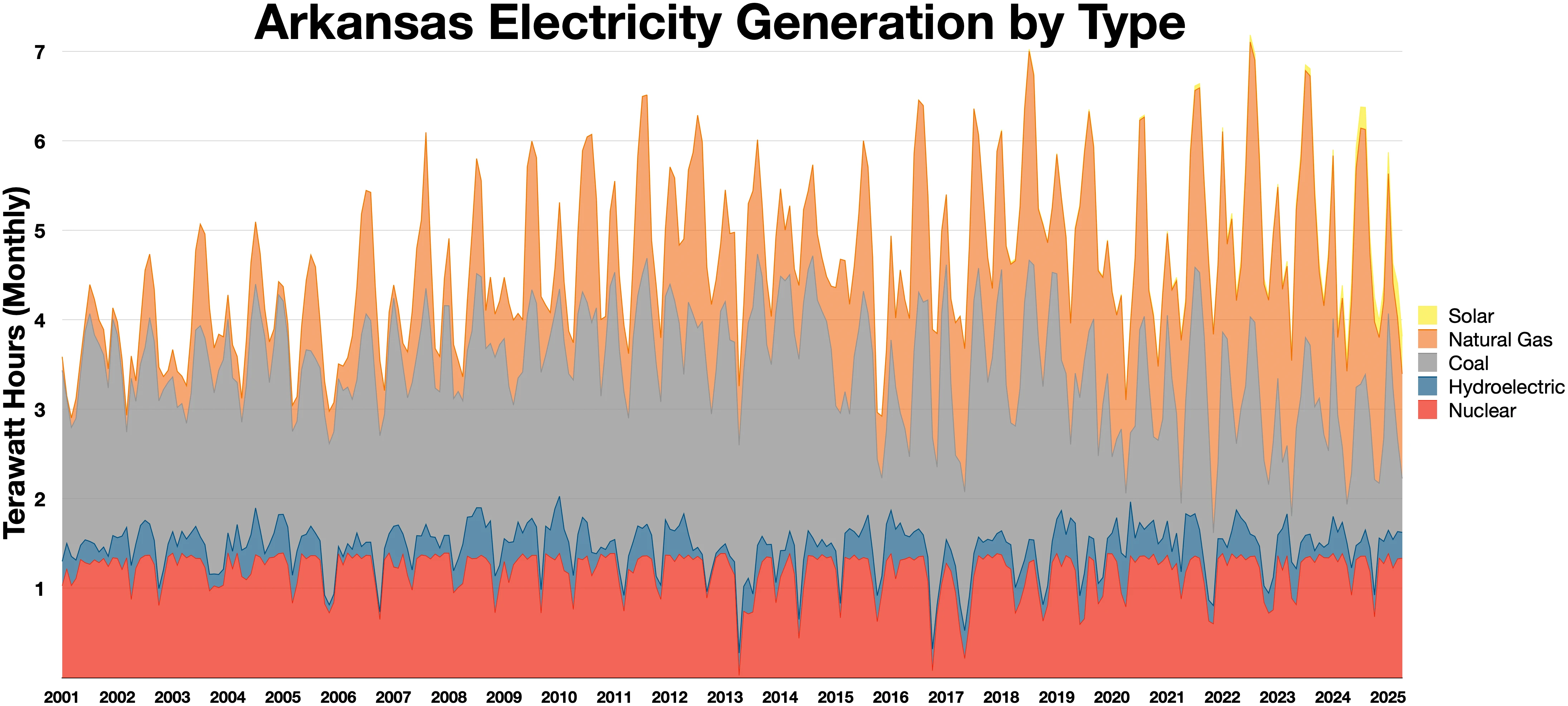
Arkansas electricity generation by type

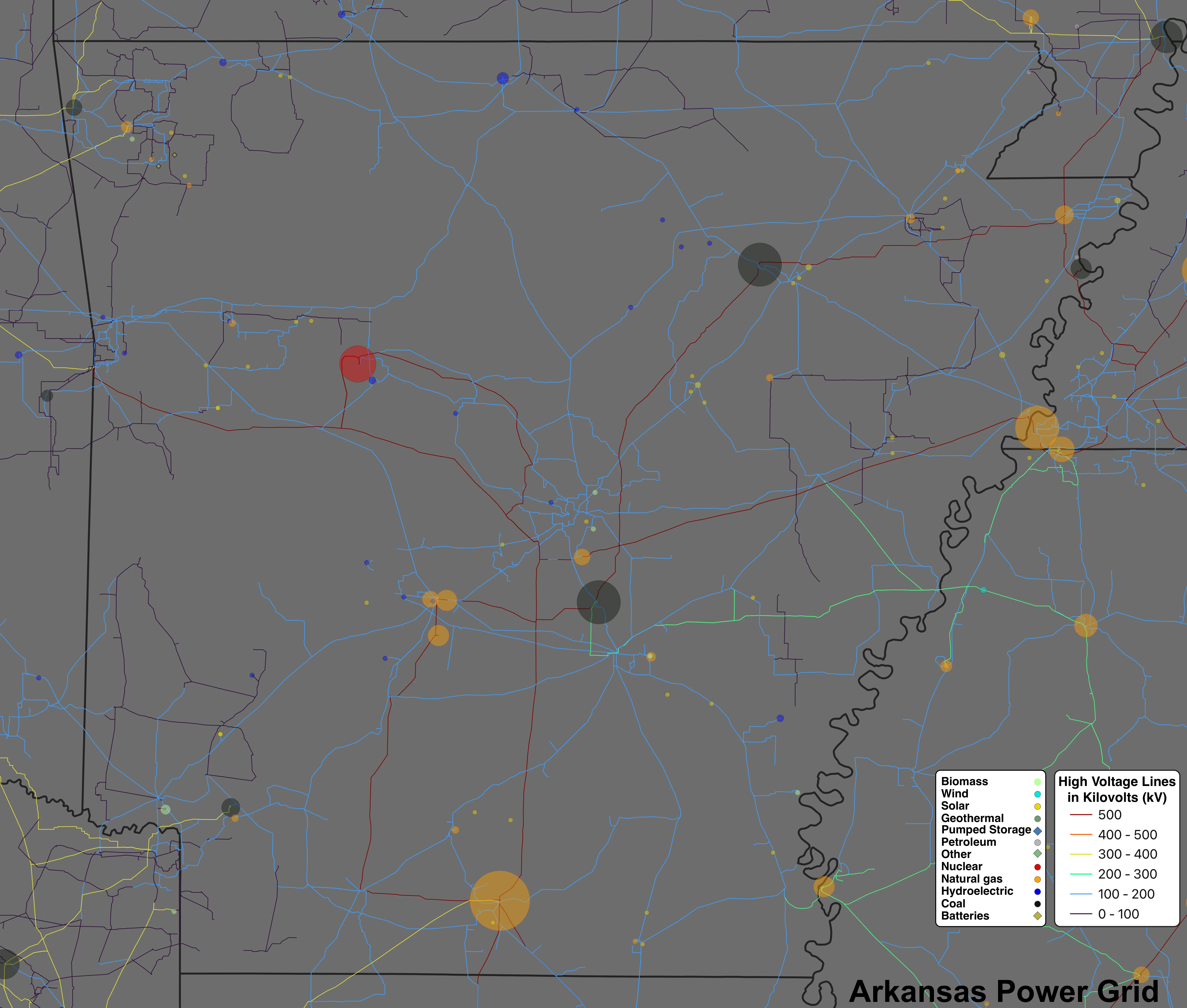
Arkansas power grid

== Biogas ==
Name	Location	Fuel	Nameplate capacity (MW)	Generating units	2019 net generation (MWh)	2019 GHG emissions (metric tons)	Operator	Opened
Eco Vista	Tontitown	Landfill gas	4	5	33,504	110,186	Waste Management	2010
Two Pine	Pulaski County	Landfill gas	5	6	31,926	51,073	Waste Management	2008

== Coal ==
Name	Location	Nameplate capacity (MW)	Generating units	2019 net generation (MWh)	2019 GHG emissions (metric tons)	Boiler type	Operator	Opened
Flint Creek	Gentry	528	1	2.4 million	2.5 million	Subcritical	American Electric Power	1978
Independence	Newark	1700	2	5.7 million	6.3 million		Entergy	1983, 1984
John W. Turk Jr.	Fulton	600	1	4 million	3.6 million	Ultra-supercritical	American Electric Power	2012
Plum Point	Mississippi County	665	1	3.9 million	4 million	Subcritical	NAES Corporation	2010
White Bluff	Redfield	1659	2	0	7.7 million		Entergy	1980, 1981

== Hydroelectric ==
Name	Location	Nameplate capacity (MW)	Generating units	2019 net generation (MWh)	Water source	Operator	Opened
Beaver Lake Dam	Carroll County	112	2	261,746	White River	Southwestern Power Administration	1965
Blakely Mountain	Garland/Montgomery	75	2	231,668	Ouachita River	Southwestern Power Administration	1956
Bull Shoals	Baxter/Marion	340	4	1.4 million	White River	Southwestern Power Administration	1953
Carl S. Whillock	Conway County	32	3	122,040	Arkansas River	Arkansas Electric Cooperative Corporation	1993
Carpenter	Garland County	56	2	76,107	Ouachita River	Entergy	1930
Clyde T. Ellis	Barling	32	3	99,455	Arkansas River	Arkansas Electric Cooperative Corporation	1988
Dardanelle	Pope/Yell	140	4	594,423	Arkansas River	Southwestern Power Administration	1965
Electric Cooperatives of Arkansas	Dumas	103	3	311,700	Arkansas River	Arkansas Electric Cooperative Corporation	1999
Greers Ferry	Cleburne County	96	2	296,621	Little Red River	Southwestern Power Administration	1964
Murray	Pulaski County	45	2	89,605	Arkansas River	North Little Rock Electric Department	1988
Narrows	Pike County	26	3	71,173	Little Missouri River	Southwestern Power Administration	1950
Norfork	Baxter County	81	2	287,794	North Fork River	Southwestern Power Administration	1944
Ozark-Jeta Taylor	Ozark	100	5	89,547	Arkansas River	Southwestern Power Administration	1973
Remmel	Hot Spring County	12	3	52,620	Ouachita River	Entergy	1924
White River Lock & Dam 1	Batesville	4	1	15,727	White River	Independence County	2007
White River Lock & Dam 2	Independence County	4	1	15,077	White River	Independence County	2007
Shelby M. Knight/ White River Lock & Dam 3	Stone County	4	1	18,945	White River	Independence County	2006

=== Pumped storage ===
Name	Location	Nameplate capacity (MW)	Generating units	2019 net generation (MWh)	Water source	Operator	Opened
DeGray	Clark County	68	2	122,691	Caddo River	Southwestern Power Administration	1972

== Natural gas ==
Name	Location	Nameplate capacity (MW)	Generating units	2019 net generation (MWh)	2019 GHG emissions (metric tons)	Operator	Opened
Elkins	Elkins	60	2	13,825		Arkansas Electric Cooperative Corporation	2010
Fulton	Fulton	153	1	118,888	67,642	Arkansas Electric Cooperative Corporation	2001
Harry D. Mattison	Tontitown	340	4	155,985	104,744	American Electric Power	2007
Harry L. Oswald	Wrightsville	548	9	368,940	157,546	Arkansas Electric Cooperative Corporation	2003
Hot Spring	Malvern	620	3	2.9 million	1.2 million	Entergy	2012
Lake Catherine	Malvern	721	4	127,495	184,861	Entergy	1950, 1953, 1970
Magnet Cove	Magnet Cove	660	3	1.7 million	669,001	Arkansas Electric Cooperative Corporation	2006
Union	El Dorado	2,200	12	11.3 million	4.3 million	Entergy	2003

=== Natural gas/petroleum ===
Name	Location	Nameplate capacity (MW)	Generating units	2019 net generation (MWh)	2019 GHG emissions (metric tons)	Operator	Opened
Carl E. Bailey	Augusta	122	1	15,894	13,912	Arkansas Electric Cooperative Corporation	1966
Dell	Dell	679	3	3.2 million	1.4 million	Associated Electric Cooperative	2007
John L. McClellan	Camden	134	1	34,073	25,388	Arkansas Electric Cooperative Corporation	1971
Jonesboro	Jonesboro	224	4	27,266	16,751	Jonesboro City Water & Light	2003, 2007
Paragould	Paragould	14	4	84		Paragould Light Water & Cable	1990
Paragould Reciprocating	Paragould	14	3	473		Paragould Light Water & Cable	2001
Pine Bluff Energy Center	Pine Bluff	236	2	1.2 million	685,030	Calpine Energy Services	2001
Thomas B. Fitzhugh	Ozark	171	2	254,918	129,404	Arkansas Electric Cooperative Corporation	1963, 2003

== Nuclear ==
Name	Location	Nameplate capacity (MW)	Generating units	2019 net generation (MWh)	Reactor type	Operator	Opened
Arkansas Nuclear One	Russellville	1824	2	14 million	Pressurized water	Entergy	1974

== Petroleum ==
Name	Location	Nameplate capacity (MW)	Generating units	2019 net generation (MWh)	2019 GHG emissions (metric tons)	Operator	Opened
Piggott Municipal	Piggott	7	4	9		City of Piggott	1952

== Solar photovoltaic ==
Name	Location	Type	Nameplate capacity (MW)	2019 net generation (MWh)	Acreage	Operator	Opened
SR Camden	East Camden	CdTe	12	26,019	100	Silicon Ranch Corporation	2016
	Van Buren		0.5		1.5	Arkansas Valley Electric Cooperative	2016
Ozarks Natural Energy Community Solar	Springdale	c-Si	1	1,533	5	Ozarks Electric Cooperative	2016
FECC Solar Benton	Benton		1	1,457	5	First Electric Cooperative	2017
Scenic Hill Solar III	Clarksville		5	10,161	42	Scenic Hill Solar	2017
	Holly Springs		1		5	Ouachita Electric Cooperative	2017
Stuttgart Solar Energy Center	Arkansas County		81	162,317	475	NextEra Energy Resources	2017
	Hamburg		1		8	Today's Power	2018
	Brookland		1		8	Today's Power	2018
	Forrest City		1		8	Woodruff Electric Cooperative	2019
	Newport		1		8	Farmers Electric Cooperative	2019
	Salem		1		8	North Arkansas Electric Cooperative	2019
	Fayetteville		10			Today’s Power	2019
	Jefferson County		0.176				2019
Leon Philpot Solar Generation Facility	Mena		1		9	Rich Mountain Electric Cooperative	2020
	Star City		1		8	C & L Electric Cooperative	2020
Chicot Solar Project	Chicot County		100		825	NextEra Energy Resources	2020
C. Wayne Whitaker Solar	Texarkana		1		7	Today's Power	2020
Searcy Solar	Searcy		100		800	Entergy	2022
Jonesboro CWL Solar Park	Jonesboro		13.25		98	Jonesboro City Water & Light	2022
Happy Solar	White County	CdTe, bifacial	135		800	JERA Nex	2023
Crossett Solar Park	Ashley County		132			Cubico Sustainable Investments	2024
Prairie Mist	Ashley County		100		700	Primergy Solar	2024
Walnut Bend	Lee County	Bifacial	100			Entergy	2024
Big Cypress Solar	Crittenden County		180			NextEra Energy Resources	2024
Crooked Lake Solar Park	Mississippi County		175			EDP Renewables	2024
Newport Solar	Newport		180		2,000	NorthStar Clean Energy	2024

== Storage ==
Name	Location	Type	Nameplate capacity (MWh)	2019 net generation (MWh)	Operator	Opened
	Fayetteville	Lithium-ion battery	24		Today’s Power	2019
Searcy Solar	Searcy	Lithium-ion battery	30		Entergy	2022

== Proposed power stations ==
Name	Location	Type	Nameplate capacity	Operator	Status
	Stuttgart	Solar PV	3.15 MW		Expected operable 2020
	Hot Springs	Solar PV	12.75 MW	Scenic Hill Solar	Expected operable 2020
	Searcy	Solar PV	1.2 MW	Entegrity Energy Partners	Expected operable 2020
	Searcy	Solar PV	4.5 MW	Entegrity Energy Partners	Expected operable 2020
	Paris	Solar PV	1.5 MW	Today’s Power	Expected operable 2020
	Pulaski County	Solar PV	8 MW	Today’s Power	Expected operable 2020
		Solar PV	180 MW		Expected operable 2023

== Retired power stations ==
Name	Location	Type	Nameplate capacity (MW)	Generating units	Operator	Opened	Closed
Cecil Lynch	North Little Rock	Natural gas/petroleum	110	2	Entergy	1949, 1954	2013
Fairbanks	Augusta	Petroleum	3	5	City of Augusta	1929	2005
Hamilton Moses	Forrest City	Natural gas/petroleum	138	2	Entergy	1951	2013
Harvey Couch	Stamps	Natural gas/petroleum	110	2	Entergy	1943, 1954	2011, 2013
Mammoth Spring Dam No. 1	Fulton County	Hydroelectric		3	Arkansas-Missouri Power Company	1927	1972
Robert E. Ritchie	Helena	Natural gas/petroleum	923	3	Entergy	1961	2013
Mabelvale	Mabelvale	Natural gas	56	4	Entergy	1970	2016

== See also ==
- List of public utilities in Arkansas
- Energy in Arkansas
- List of power stations in the United States
