= Arkansas Electric Cooperative Corporation =

Electrical generation and distribution cooperative

- Company type: Nonprofit utility cooperative
- Founded: July 11, 1949
- Headquarters: Little Rock, Arkansas, United States
- Key people: Buddy Hasten (CEO)
- Products: Electricity
- Operating income: $736 million
- Total assets: $1.6 billion
- Members: 17 regional cooperatives in Arkansas
- Number of employees: 248
- Website: aecc.com

The Arkansas Electric Cooperative Corporation (AECC) is an electrical generation and distribution cooperative founded in 1949 and headquartered in Little Rock, Arkansas. It sells wholesale energy to 17 member cooperatives serving 500,000 customers across 62% of the land area of Arkansas.

== Generation facilities ==
Name	Location	Fuel	Nameplate capacity (MW)	Generating units	Percent owned/ leased	Opened
Carl S. Whillock	Morrilton	Hydropower	32	3	100%	1993
Clyde T. Ellis	Barling	Hydropower	32	3	100%	1988
Electric Cooperatives of Arkansas; Hydropower Generating Station	Dumas	Hydropower	103	3	100%	1999
Elkins	Elkins	Natural gas	60	2	100%	2010
Flint Creek	Gentry	Coal	528	2	50%	1978
Fulton	Fulton	Natural gas	153	1	100%	2001
Harry L. Oswald	Wrightsville	Natural gas	548	9	100%	2003
Independence	Newark	Coal	1700	2	35%	1983
John L. McClellan	Camden	Natural gas/Petroleum	134	1	100%	1971
John W. Turk Jr.	Fulton	Natural gas	600	1	12%	2012
Magnet Cove	Magnet Cove	Natural gas	660	3	100%	2006
Thomas B. Fitzhugh	Ozark	Natural gas/Petroleum	171	2	100%	1963
White Bluff	Redfield	Coal	1659	2	35%	1980
Woodruff	Augusta	Solar	122	1	100%	2024

== Long-term purchase agreements ==
Besides its owned and leased generation facilities, AECC also provides energy through long-term purchase agreements, including:

- a 20-year agreement to purchase 100 megawatts from the Wildhorse Mountain wind farm in Pushmataha County, Oklahoma
- an agreement with the Southwestern Power Administration expiring June 30, 2020 to purchase up to 189 megawatts from its supply of hydropower
- a 20-year agreement to purchase up to 51 megawatts from the Flat Ridge 2 wind farm in Kansas
- a 20-year agreement to be the sole recipient of energy generated at the 150-megawatt Origin wind farm in Oklahoma

== Member cooperatives ==
- Arkansas Valley Electric Cooperative
- Ashley-Chicot Electric Cooperative
- C&L Electric Cooperative
- Carroll Electric Cooperative
- Clay County Electric Cooperative
- Craighead Electric Cooperative
- Farmers Electric Cooperative
- First Electric Cooperative
- Mississippi County Electric Cooperative
- North Arkansas Electric Cooperative
- Ouachita Electric Cooperative Corporation
- Ozarks Electric Cooperative
- Petit Jean Electric Cooperative
- Rich Mountain Electric Cooperative
- South Central Arkansas Electric Cooperative
- Southwest Arkansas Electric Cooperative
- Woodruff Electric Cooperative
