= Energy in Arkansas =

US state energy production

The United States state of Arkansas is a significant producer of natural gas and a minor producer of petroleum.

Though a small percentage of total consumption, its many waterways provide for a higher than average hydroelectric generation capacity. A higher than average solar exposure has recently begun to be taken advantage of in the state, with three solar photovoltaic generation facilities going online in 2016 and more under construction. Wind power potential is modest in Arkansas and the state has no utility-scale wind generation facilities.

A network of 17 regional cooperatives, four investor-owned companies, and a number of municipal providers generate and deliver electricity to Arkansas customers. Five utilities deliver natural gas.

== Regulation ==
The Arkansas Public Service Commission oversees all four of the state's natural gas utilities and 24 of its electric utilities. The commission lacks authority over 15 municipal providers.

== Policy ==
Property assessed clean energy (PACE)
Arkansas enacted property assessed clean energy (PACE) legislation in 2013. The law enables bonds to be issued in voluntarily created energy improvement districts that are then used to fund low-interest loans for renewable energy or efficiency upgrades. Cities Fayetteville and North Little Rock have since formed local energy improvement districts.

Net metering
Net metering rules in the state were first established by the Arkansas Public Service Commission in 2002 and were expanded in 2007. Energy generated by renewable systems up to 25 kilowatts for residential customers and up to 300 kilowatts for nonresidential is eligible. Under the law, utilities grant customers credits for excess energy fed to the grid. Unused credits at the end of a billing year are usable in the next billing year up to the customer's four-month average use in the previous year. Any additional credits are forfeited to the utility.

== Efficiency ==
The American Council for an Energy-Efficient Economy ranked Arkansas 31st among the most energy-efficient states in 2017, down from 27th in 2016. Arkansas ranked 17th among fellow states in 2014 for overall per capita energy consumption.

== Electricity ==
Arkansas consumed 48,194 million kilowatt hours in 2010. In 2012, the state exported 131 trillion more BTUs of electricity than it imported.

=== Rates ===
The average per-kilowatt-hour electricity rate in Arkansas was $0.08 in 2014, the fourth-lowest in the country. Rates by sector in 2014 were $0.10 for residential, $0.06 for industrial, and $0.08 for commercial.

=== Generation ===
Net generation by fuel source.

In 2014, Arkansas had 14,754 megawatts of net summer generating capacity and generated 62 million megawatt hours.

Generation facilities providing public power in the state include:

- five coal-fired plants
- 20 hydroelectric installations, including one pumped storage facility
- 10 natural gas-fired plants
- seven dual-fuel natural gas/petroleum-fired plants
- six photovoltaic solar facilities
- two landfill gas facilities
- one nuclear power plant
- one petroleum-fired plant

The state is home to the John W. Turk Jr. Coal Plant, which came online in 2012 as the first sustained ultra-supercritical coal-fired power plant in the United States.

Arkansas total electric industry generation in megawatt hours by fuel type, 1990–2012.

Emissions
In 2014, Arkansas' power industry released 30 million metric tons of carbon dioxide, 66,524 metric tons of sulfur dioxide, and 33,229 metric tons of nitrogen oxides. In 2013, Arkansas ranked 30th in the most energy-related carbon dioxide emissions and 16th-highest for per capita energy-related carbon dioxide emissions.

Solar power

A 2010 report by the Institute for Local Self-Reliance estimated Arkansas could generate 19 percent of its 2007 energy need solely from rooftop solar photovoltaics.

Three utility-scale solar photovoltaic generation facilities began operating in Arkansas in 2016:

- The state's first utility-scale solar facility, a 12-megawatt farm in East Camden serving an Aerojet Rocketdyne manufacturing facility. Excess energy from the farm is sold to the public electrical grid.
- A 1-megawatt farm in Springdale operated by the Ozarks Electric Cooperative
- A 0.5-megawatt farm in Van Buren operated by the Arkansas Valley Electric Cooperative

In 2017, the 81-megawatt Stuttgart Solar Energy Center began operating in Stuttgart.

Two solar photovoltaic facilities are in progress:

- The 100-megawatt Chicot Solar Project will be the state's largest solar facility upon completion.
- A 6.5-megawatt facility is planned to open in 2018 in Clarksville.

A 1.2-megawatt array for a L'Oréal manufacturing facility in North Little Rock is scheduled to be operational in mid-2017. Notable small-scale solar power installations include rooftop photovoltaics on the Fayetteville Public Library and the Clinton Presidential Center in Little Rock.

Wind power

The U.S. Department of Energy estimates the state has 9,200 megawatts of potential wind power capacity at 80 meters. Arkansas is one of 9 U.S. states and the District of Columbia without utility-scale wind power.

Other renewables
Arkansas is 14th among states with the most installed hydroelectric generating capacity and 16th with the most generation from biomass. In 2011, hydroelectric installations generated 2,992 million kilowatt hours, while 1,668 million kilowatt hours were generated from biomass, mostly from wood products.

=== Providers ===
Arkansas' electric providers include four investor-owned utilities and a number of municipal and regional cooperative providers. Generation and transmission cooperative Arkansas Electric Cooperative Corporation provides wholesale energy to 17 regional member cooperatives in the state.

== Natural gas ==
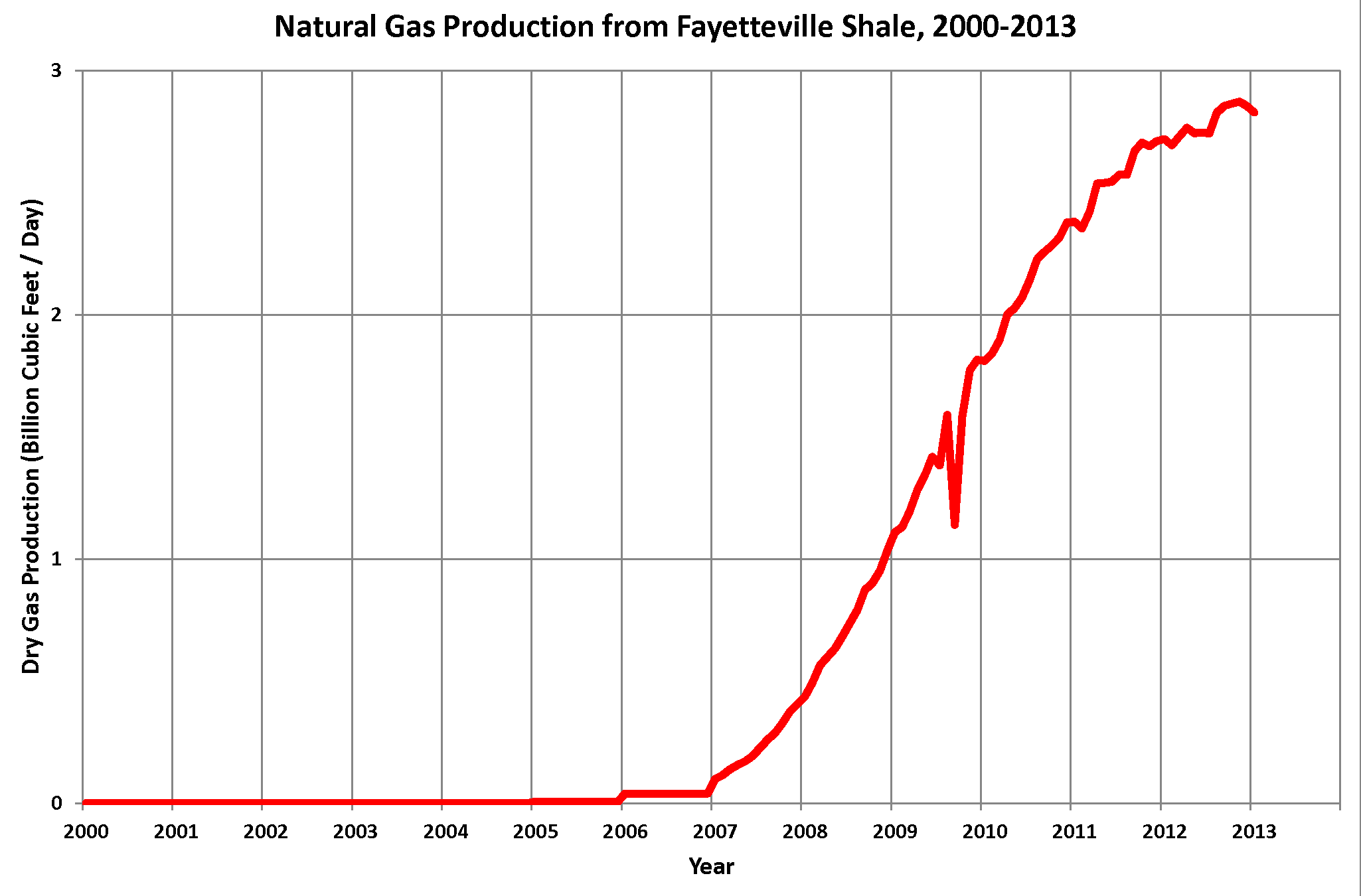
Natural gas extraction from Arkansas' Fayetteville Shale, 2000–2013.

=== Rates ===
In 2015, average natural gas rates per thousand cubic feet were $11.58 for residential, $8.43 for commercial, and $6.91 for industrial customers.

=== Production ===
The Fayetteville Shale, a narrow Mississippian age geological formation that runs across the center of the state, accounts for nearly all of Arkansas natural gas production. Proven reserves of dry natural gas in the state were estimated at 12,789 billion cubic feet in 2014.

Marketed natural gas production in Arkansas more than doubled from 2008 to 2010. In 2014, natural gas production amounted to 1.12 million cubic feet, ranking it eighth-highest among fellow states. Arkansas accounted for 4.1 percent of U.S. production of marketed natural gas in 2014.

Fracking
More than 1,000 minor earthquakes in 2010 and 2011 in Greenbrier led to the Arkansas Oil and Gas Commission to close several hydraulic fracturing wells. Scientists at the University of Memphis and the Arkansas Geological Survey determined the quakes were likely caused by underground fracking wastewater disposal. Local residents filed five lawsuits in federal court against Chesapeake Energy and BHP Billiton.

== Petroleum ==
=== Production ===
Oil drilling began in south Arkansas in 1920 with the Hunter No. 1 well installed in Ouachita County. Commercial oil production began in 1921 with the S.T. Busey well in Union County near El Dorado.

Proven petroleum reserves in the state were estimated at 55 million barrels in 2012, revised up from 40 million barrels in 2011.

== See also ==
- Energy in the United States
- List of power stations in Arkansas
