= Fannin County Electric Cooperative =

- Company type: Utility cooperative
- Industry: Electric power
- Founded: 1937; 88 years ago
- Headquarters: Bonham, Texas, United States
- Area served: Fannin County, Texas
- Website: fanninec.coop

Fannin County Electric Cooperative, Inc is a non-profit rural electric utility cooperative headquartered in Bonham, Texas.

The Cooperative was organized in 1937.

The Cooperative serves portions of five counties in the state of Texas, in a territory generally surrounding Bonham.

Currently the Cooperative has 1,829 miles of line and 837,664 meters.
