= Palmetto Electric =

Non-profit electricity utility cooperative

Palmetto Electric Cooperative Inc.
- Company type: Cooperative
- Industry: Electric Utility
- Founded: 1940
- Headquarters: Ridgeland, South Carolina
- Website: Palmetto Electric

Palmetto Electric Cooperative Inc. is a non-profit electric utility cooperative headquartered in Ridgeland, South Carolina. It has a membership of approximately 66,000 customers.

== History ==
Palmetto Electric was formed in 1940 by a group of residents in response to the lack of service in rural areas by investor-owned utility companies. By 1942, the company began servicing Hampton County. Shortly thereafter, they began servicing Jasper County. In 1950, they energized the first lines to Hilton Head Island.

== Leadership ==
Palmetto Electric Cooperative is governed by 12 trustees, six of whom reside in Beaufort County, three of whom reside in Hampton County, and three of whom reside in Jasper County. Board members serve terms of three years each. As of January 2012, elected persons include:

- Jeremiah E. Vaigneur, Chairman, Jasper County
- C. Alex Ulmer, Vice Chairman, Beaufort County
- Eunice F. Spilliards, Secretary-Treasurer, Jasper County

== Service area ==
Palmetto Electric services southern Beaufort, Hampton, and Jasper counties. There are offices located in the towns of Hampton, Hilton Head, Hardeeville, and Ridgeland.

== Charity ==
In 2017, Palmetto Electric donated $50,000 to the TCL's Criminal Justice Program towards their virtual weapons training system, which can be used by local law enforcement agencies to educate and improve the skills of law enforcement officers.

== Affiliations ==
- Electric Cooperatives of South Carolina: provides legal services, public relations and advertising, employee training, and insurance to members.
- National Rural Electric Cooperative Association
- Palmetto Economic Development Corporation
- Touchstone Energy

== Energy sources ==
Palmetto Electric receives 100% of its energy from Santee Cooper.
