= Bluebonnet Electric Cooperative =

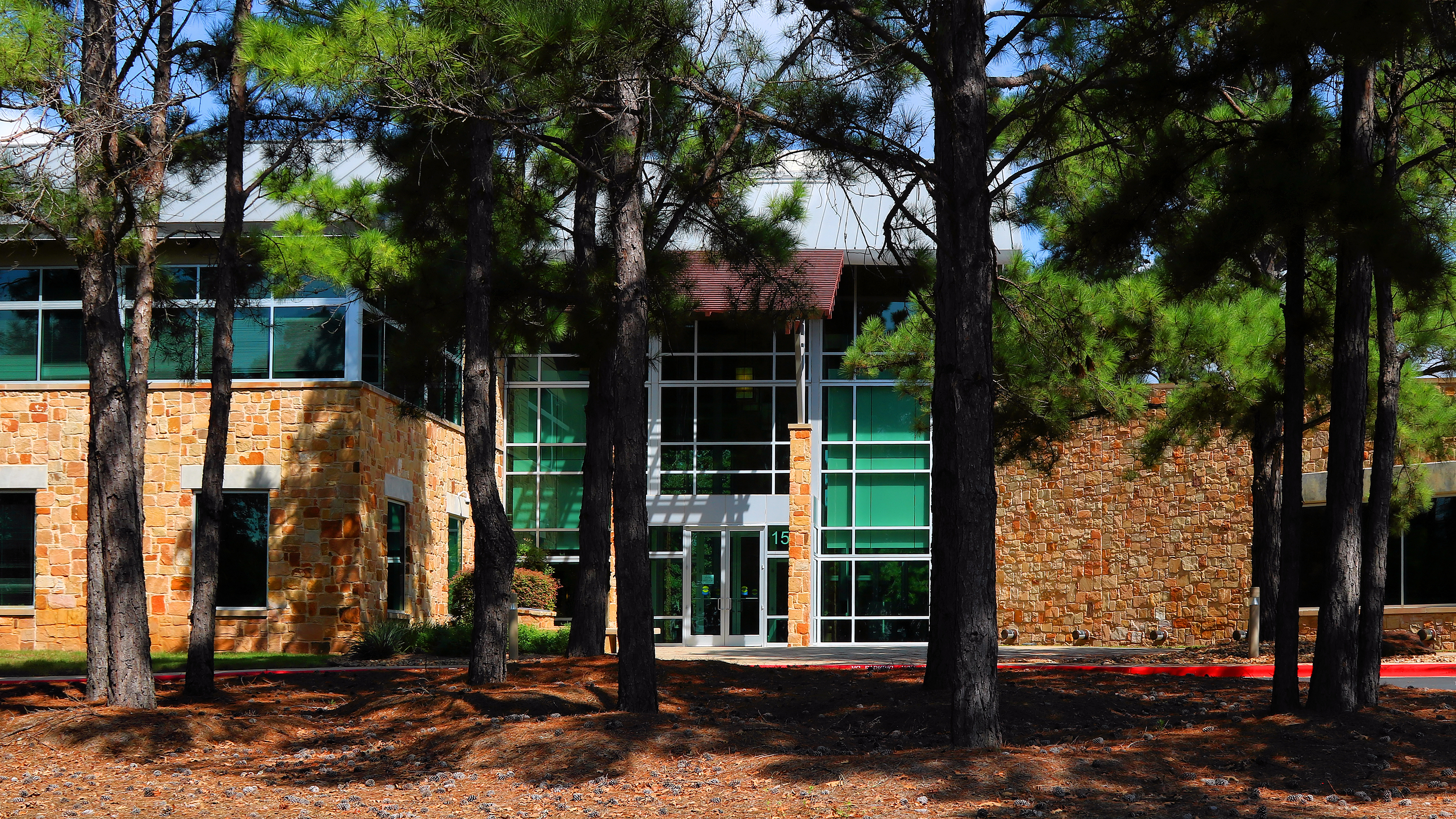
- Headquarters building
- Abbreviation: BEC
- Formation: 1939
- Founded at: Texas
- Type: Rural electric cooperative
- Legal status: Non-profit
- Purpose: Provide rural electricity in Texas
- Headquarters: Bastrop, Texas vicinity
- Location: Central Texas
- Region served: US-TX
- Members: 112,000+
- CEO: Matt Bentke
- Affiliations: NRECA
- Website: www.bluebonnet.coop

Bluebonnet Electric Cooperative is an electric utility cooperative headquartered in Bastrop County, Texas. Founded in 1939, Bluebonnet is one of Texas’ oldest electric cooperatives.
