= Sawnee EMC =

Electrical cooperative

Sawnee Electric Membership Corporation
- Formerly: Forsyth County Electric Membership Corporation
- Type: Utility cooperative (501(c)(12))
- Industry: Electricity
- Founded: July 16, 1938
- Headquarters: 543 Atlanta Road; Cumming, Georgia, United States
- Area served: Northern Georgia
- Key people: Michael A. Goodroe, president and CEO
- Products: Electricity
- Revenue: $399,589,616 (2021)
- Members: 193,491 (2022)
- Number of employees: 403 (2026)
- Website: sawnee.coop

Sawnee EMC (SEMC; founded as Forsyth County EMC) is an electrical generation and transmission cooperative founded in July 1938 and based in Cumming, Georgia. As of 2022, Sawnee EMC is the third-largest electric co-op in Georgia and the eighth-largest in the United States; as of 2026 it operates 12,656 miles (20,368 km) of power lines in seven counties: Cherokee, Dawson, Forsyth, Fulton, Gwinnett, Hall, and Lumpkin. Sawnee is a member of the National Rural Electric Cooperative Association and Touchstone Energy.

As of 2026, Michael Goodroe is the president and CEO of Sawnee EMC.

== History ==
After the Rural Electrification Administration was created in 1935, the Forsyth County Electric Membership Corporation was incorporated on July 16, 1938, and the co-op began providing electricity to about 750 homes via 163 miles (262 km) of power lines on June 22, 1939. Forsyth County EMC changed its name to Sawnee EMC in August 1950, taking its name from nearby Sawnee Mountain. In 1974, Sawnee EMC was one of the dozens of Georgia-based EMCs that founded Oglethorpe Power, and Sawnee was similarly a founding member of the renewables-focused Green Power EMC in 2001.

=== Domain name incident ===
In May 2024, Sawnee advised customers to switch from www.sawnee.com to www.sawnee.coop following a cyber security incident.

== Board of directors ==
Sawnee EMC's board of directors as of 2026 is composed of nine elected members:

Name	District and position
Marshall Millwood	District 2
Adrian Flack	District 3
Gary Porter	District 4; vice-chairman
Tim Heard	District 6; chairman
Rodney Reese	District 9
Terry Mathi	District 7
Donna Yost	District 8
Larry Evans	District 5
Roger Coker	District 1; secretary-treasurer

== Foundation ==
Sawnee EMC operates the Sawnee Electric Membership Foundation, which donates to schools and charities in its service area. Since 2003, the foundation has given out $3.8 million.
