= Beaver Water District =

Agency overview
- Formed: 1957
- Headquarters: 301 N. Primrose Road; Lowell, AR 72745
- Agency executive: M. Lane Crider P.E., LEED AP, Chief Executive Officer
- Website: http://www.bwdh2o.org/

Beaver Water District (BWD) is a water district created in 1957 as a quasi-governmental agency to provide treated drinking water to the communities of Northwest Arkansas. The district's source is Beaver Lake, an impoundment of the White River created by Beaver Dam. The district wholesales treated potable water to Bentonville, Fayetteville, Rogers and Springdale, who then re-sell the water to their residential/commercial customers and smaller nearby communities.

== Administration ==
Beaver Water District is governed by its board of directors. The elected six-member board contains three members each from Benton and Washington counties. The board meets monthly at the district's office in Lowell.

== Customers ==
BWD sells water wholesale to the four largest communities in NWA, who utilize their own distribution systems to deliver water to residential and commercial customers. All four communities also resell to smaller communities within their service area that utilize distribution systems under their jurisdiction. For example, Springdale Water Utilities owns and maintains water mains in Johnson.

- Bentonville
  - Bella Vista
  - Cave Springs
- Fayetteville
  - Elkins
  - Farmington
  - Goshen
  - Greenland
  - Mount Olive Rural Water Association
  - Wheeler
  - Johnson (south)
  - Rural Washington County
  - West Fork
- Springdale
  - Bethel Heights
  - Elm Springs
  - Johnson (north)
  - Lowell (south)
  - Rural Benton and Washington counties
  - Tontitown
- Rogers
  - Lowell (north)
  - Benton County Rural Development Authority (RDA) No. 4 Frisco Springs.
- Madison County Rural Water District

== Controversy ==
In 2003, residents near Monte Ne filed a complaint with the Arkansas Department of Environmental Quality (ADEQ) that alleged BWD was polluting the bay with untreated process water from filter backwashing. Aluminum sulfate (alum), used as a flocculation agent in drinking water treatment, was alleged to be 10 feet (3.0 m) deep in places and was lining the limestone channels of the cove. ADEQ concluded that aluminum levels were elevated and could be toxic to aquatic biota, but was not toxic to humans. Soil samples indicated elevated levels of arsenic, barium, cadmium, chromium, lead, and mercury. BWD was ordered to pay a $9,000 fine for eight violations of its NPDES permit under the Clean Water Act.

== See also ==
- List of public utilities in Arkansas
