= Bowie-Cass Electric Cooperative =

Bowie-Cass Electric Cooperative, Inc. is a rural utility cooperative headquartered in Douglassville, Texas that was formed in 1937. The cooperative currently serves 38,261 meters with 6,073 miles (9,774 km) of line. Its territory includes portions of Bowie, Cass, Franklin, Morris, Red River and Titus counties, all located in Northeast Texas.

== History ==
On April 10, 1956 Mabel Bryan Morriss, secretary-treasurer of the cooperative, traveled to Washington, DC, to present Rural Utilities Service (REA) administrator Archer Nelson a check for $175,000. The check paid off in full the cooperative's first two loans and made advance payments on the others.

For Morriss, it was a measure of personal triumph for it was she who almost single-handedly begged, pleaded, and pestered the REA into funding the cooperative in the first place. Her first attempt in October 1935 came back with a reply that Bowie and Cass counties should join forces with Panola County in establishing a cooperative — notwithstanding that the two counties are not only non-contiguous, but are separated by Harrison and Marion counties. Further attempts in 1936 were also rejected; even the county agent was not in favor of the idea.

Finally, REA sent a representative to the area, who told Morriss that she hadn't done anything, and if she didn't provide the necessary information (financial information showing that the residents could pay for electricity) within one week, her plans would be dead. Now knowing what she needed to do, within the week she obtained statements from every banker in the area, stating that the residents had bank accounts and a reliable source of income, and signed up the required three people per mile.

In August 1937, REA finally approved the project, commenting "I know this thing will never pay out, but this is the only way to get that woman off our necks!" In addition to Morriss' persistence in establishing the co-op, she would later donate 2 acres (8,100 m^{2}) of her property to establish a permanent office in Douglassville, which today remains the co-op headquarters.
