= Farmers Electric Cooperative (Texas) =

Farmers Electric Cooperative is a community based electric utility cooperative headquartered in Greenville, Texas.

Founded in 1937, Farmers Electric Cooperative is a member-owned electric utility serving more than 66,000 members and servicing over 5,900 miles of line in a fast-growing region spanning Dallas, Collin, Rockwall, Hunt, Kaufman, Rains, Hopkins, Delta, Franklin, Fannin, Van Zandt, and Wood counties.
