= Coleman County Electric Cooperative =

Non-profit utility cooperative in Texas, US

Coleman County Electric Cooperative, Inc. is a non-profit rural electric utility cooperative headquartered in Coleman, Texas. The Cooperative was organized in 1937, and established under the federal Rural Electrification Act. This Cooperative serves portions of eight counties in the state of Texas, in a territory generally surrounding the town of Coleman. The eight counties are these:

- Brown County, Texas
- Callahan County, Texas
- Coke County, Texas
- Coleman County, Texas
- Concho County, Texas
- Runnels County, Texas
- Taylor County, Texas
- Tom Green County, Texas

As of 2023, the Cooperative has 3,780 miles of line and serves approximately 8,600 meters. It is part of a federation of utility cooperatives called Touchstone Energy.
