= White Bluff Power Plant =

Power station in Arkansas, United States

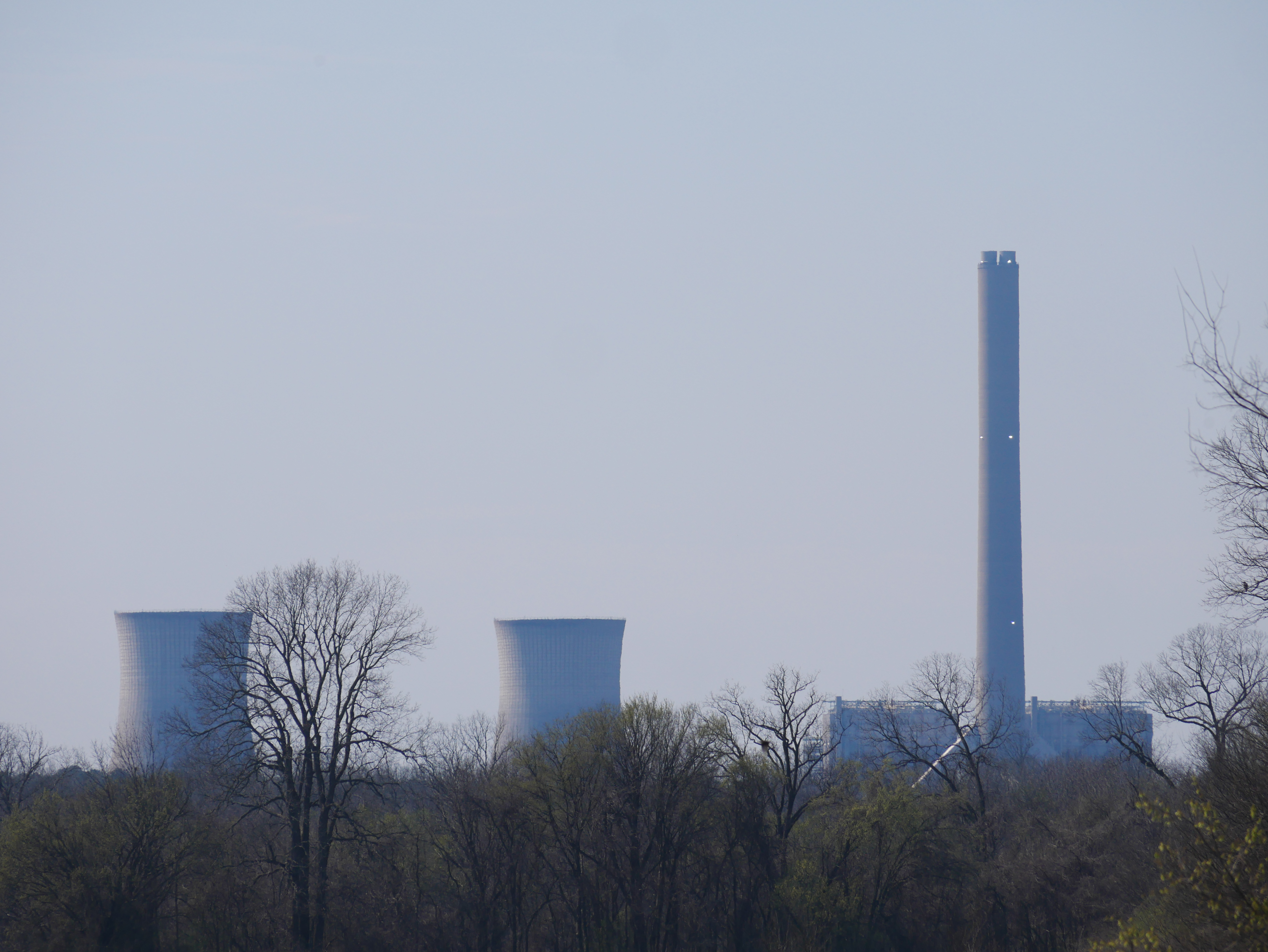
- White Bluff Power Plant in 2023
- Country: United States
- Location: Barraque Township, Arkansas
- Coordinates: 34°25′24.8″N 92°08′24.7″W
- Status: Operational
- Construction began: 1978
- Commission date: August 1980
- Decommission date: 2028
- Owners: Entergy Arkansas; Arkansas Electric Cooperative; City Water, Light and Power Jonesboro; Conway Corporation; City of West Memphis
- Operator: Entergy Arkansas
- Site elevation: 312 ft (95 m); 95 m (312 ft)
- Cooling source: Arkansas River

Power generation
- Nameplate capacity: 1,800 MW

The White Bluff Power Plant is a 1,800.0-megawatt (MW) coal-fired power station operated by Entergy Arkansas in Barraque Township, Arkansas. The plant is owned and operated by Entergy and has one of the tallest chimneys in the world at 305 metres (1,001 ft), which was built in 1980.

== Retirement ==
In 2018, Entergy announced it will close the plant by 2028.

== Emissions ==
In 2013, Environment America ranked the plant 42 on its list of the 100 dirtiest coal-fired power stations in the U.S., reporting that its 2011 emissions were equivalent to 2.16 million passenger vehicles.

The plant released 10,250,228 metric tons of greenhouse gases in 2012 according to the EPA. The emissions in metric tons comprised:

- Carbon dioxide: 10,172,525
- Methane: 24,688
- Nitrous oxide: 53,015

== See also ==
- List of coal-fired power stations in the United States
- List of power stations in Arkansas
