= Bailey County Electric Cooperative Association =

- Company type: utility cooperative
- Founded: 1938
- Headquarters: Muleshoe, Texas

Bailey County Electric Cooperative Association is a rural utility cooperative headquartered in Muleshoe, Texas.

The cooperative was formed in September 1938 and energized the first 249 miles (401 km) of line, serving 362 customers, of which five are still members as of 2007, in November 1939.

The cooperative currently serves about 1,800 members with over 2,700 miles (4,300 km) of line.

The cooperative's territory includes portions of Bailey, Castro, Cochran, Lamb, and Parmer counties, all located in the South Plains region of Texas near its border with New Mexico.
