= Fayette Electric Cooperative =

Rural electric utility cooperative established in La Grange, Texas

- Type: Utility cooperative
- Industry: Electric power
- Founded: 1937; 89 years ago
- Headquarters: La Grange, Texas, United States
- Area served: Austin County; Fayette County; Colorado County; Lavaca County
- Website: fayette.coop

Fayette Electric Cooperative, Inc. is a non-profit rural electric utility cooperative headquartered in La Grange, Texas.

The Cooperative was organized in 1937.

The Cooperative serves portions of seven counties in the state of Texas, in a territory generally surrounding La Grange.
