= Concho Valley Electric Cooperative =

Electric utility cooperative in Texas, US

Concho Valley Electric Cooperative, Inc. is a non-profit rural electric utility cooperative headquartered in San Angelo, Texas.

The Cooperative was organized in 1940.

The Cooperative serves portions of 10 counties in the state of Texas, in a territory generally surrounding San Angelo (including portions thereof) and the Concho River.

Currently the Cooperative has over 4,300 miles of line and over 14,200 meters.
