= Grayson-Collin Electric Cooperative =

American non-profit electric utility cooperative

Grayson-Collin Electric Cooperative, Inc. is a non-profit rural electric utility cooperative headquartered in Van Alstyne, Texas.

The Cooperative was organized in 1937.

As its name suggests, the cooperative serves the rural portions of Grayson County, Texas, and Collin County, Texas, in a territory, generally surrounding Van Alstyne.

In addition to electricity, the cooperative also provides telephone and Internet service through unregulated subsidiaries.
