= Oliver-Mercer Electric Cooperative =

Oliver-Mercer Electric Cooperative is a public utility cooperative based in Hazen, North Dakota. It serves as the electric distribution utility in a portion of south central North Dakota. Oliver-Mercer Electric receives power from Basin Electric Power Cooperative and from the Western Area Power Administration.

== See also ==
- United States energy law
