= Deep East Texas Electric Cooperative =

Deep East Texas Electric Cooperative, Inc. is a non-profit rural electric utility cooperative headquartered in San Augustine, Texas.

The Cooperative was organized in January 1938 and its first power lines were energized in December of that year.

The Cooperative serves portions of eight counties in the state of Texas, in a territory generally surrounding San Augustine.

Currently (as of July 2006) the Cooperative has approximately 7,000 miles of line and nearly 37,000 meters. This includes the customers of the Garrison, Texas municipal-owned system which the Cooperative purchased in September 2001.
