= Whole Hog Café =

Chain of American barbecue restaurants

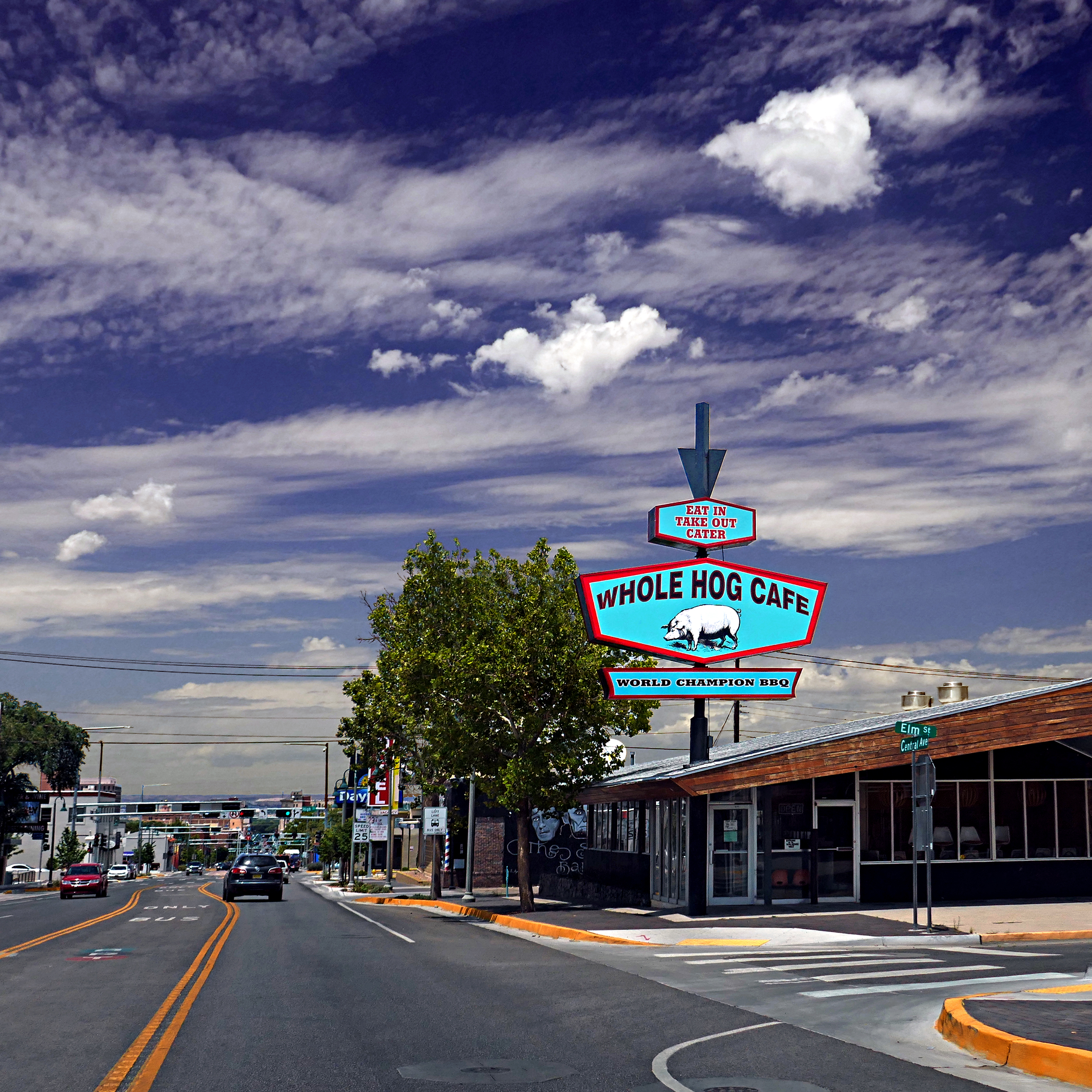
Whole Hog Cafe in Albuquerque, New Mexico

Whole Hog Café is a United States restaurant chain based in Little Rock, Arkansas. It is named after whole hog barbecue. It offers barbecue along with side dishes including potato salad, beans, coleslaw, salad, and dinner rolls. Other specialties include barbecue nachos and loaded baked potatoes. Currently there are ten locations, some corporate and some franchised. There are restaurants in Arkansas, Missouri, New Jersey, and New Mexico.

Whole Hog Café has been featured on Food Network's Rachael Ray's Tasty Travels.

== History ==
Competing as the Southern Gentlemen's Culinary Society, founders Ron Blasingame, Mike "Sarge" Davis, and Steve Lucchi submitted their barbecue in several competitions eventually winning the Memphis in May World Championship Barbecue Cooking Contest in 2002.

On September 22, 2009, Ron Blasingame died at the age of 60.

== Locations ==
=== Arkansas ===
- Bryant
- Conway
- Fayetteville
- Little Rock
- North Little Rock

=== Missouri ===
- Springfield

=== New Jersey ===
- Cherry Hill
- Medford

=== New Mexico ===
- Albuquerque
- Santa Fe

== See also ==
- Whole hog barbecue
