= Field Agent (company) =

Field Agent, Inc.
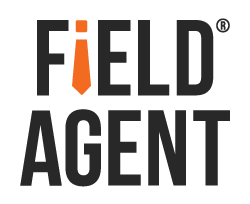
- Company type: Private
- Industry: Retail, market research
- Founded: 2010; 15 years ago
- Founder: Rick West, Henry Ho, Kelly Miller
- Headquarters: Fayetteville, Arkansas
- Area served: United States, Canada, Mexico, Australia, South Africa, United Kingdom
- Products: Retail audits, shopper insights, mystery shopping
- Number of employees: 60+
- Website: fieldagent.net

Field Agent, Inc. is a firm headquartered in Fayetteville, Arkansas. The company crowdsources shoppers’ smartphones to furnish consumer packaged goods, retailers, and agencies with in-store photos and videos, retail information, and shopper insights.

Through Field Agent's mobile app, “agents,” as the company calls its app-users, search for and complete relatively basic tasks inside stores and other locations. These tasks, which generally pay agents between $2 and $12 per completion, include in-store display audits, price checks, out-of-stock audits, competitive assessments, mystery shops, and other jobs that commonly include photo requests and survey questions. The Field Agent crowd sourcing platform also powers the firm's retail-specific search engine, Jicco, which supplies businesses with on-demand photos and information from inside stores.

Launched in 2010, Field Agent's mobile app has been downloaded approximately one million times in the United States alone. Field Agent also maintains operations in several other markets, including Canada, Mexico, Australia, South Africa, and the United Kingdom.

== History ==
Field Agent was founded in 2009 when founders Rick West, Henry Ho, and Kelly Miller began considering how the smartphone, specifically the iPhone 3GS, could change the way companies gather location-specific, retail information. West was quoted as saying, “We began to see how the average consumer armed with an iPhone could penetrate certain barricades that had gone up in the retail world.”

On April 17, 2010, Field Agent's mobile app launched on the App Store, generating 3,000 downloads in the first 20 minutes. In 2013, Field Agent received $2.5 million in Series A funding, with a $2 million follow-on investment, from Kansas City-based Five Elms Capital.
