= Little Rock Port Authority Railroad =

Overview
- Headquarters: Little Rock, Arkansas
- Reporting mark: LRPA
- Locale: Arkansas
- Dates of operation: 1968–present

Technical
- Track gauge: 4 ft 8 1/2 in (1,435 mm) standard gauge
- Length: 20 mi (32 km)

The Port of Little Rock Railroad, sometimes called the Little Rock Port Authority Railroad, provides switching services through a 20-mile system of tracks at the 4,000-acre Little Rock Port Industrial Park at the Port of Little Rock, Arkansas. It provides port access and railroad interchange services not only to the more than twenty businesses at the park, but also to any business seeking to ship or receive cargo through the McClellan-Kerr Arkansas River Navigation System.

== History ==
Purchase of 151 acres in July 1967 started the planning process for the dock area at the Port. Four miles of railroad were constructed by July, 1968, the year in which the port began operations. In 1970, the railroad connected to what were then the Rock Island Railroad and the Missouri Pacific Railroad, and started work on a classification yard. By 1974 the classification yard was complete. In 1977, railroad engine storage and maintenance buildings were completed.

== Interchange ==
The line extends from the dock to the interchange point with what is now the Union Pacific (UP) at a junction near Clinton National Airport. Access to what is now the BNSF is obtained through trackage/haulage rights.

== Operations ==
The port railroad operates with two locomotives and five crew members. It utilizes a tandem unit with an EMD GP15-1 locomotive owned by the port, and one EMD SW1500 locomotive leased from GATX. The railroad handles over 20,000 cars annually.
