= First National Bank of North Arkansas =

- Industry: Financial services
- Founded: 1889
- Headquarters: 305-307 Public Square, Berryville, 72616 Arkansas, United States
- Key people: W. A. Hudspeth III (CEO and President)
- Website: www.fnbna.com

The First National Bank of North Arkansas (from 1913 to 2011 the First National Bank of Berryville) was founded in 1889 and is one of the oldest functioning regional banks in Arkansas.

In 2022, the changed its name to Bank of 1889.
