= John W. Turk Jr. Coal Plant =

- Country: United States
- Location: Fulton, Hempstead County, Arkansas
- Coordinates: 33.6505187°N 93.8115353°W
- Status: Operational
- Construction began: 2008
- Commission date: December 20, 2012
- Construction cost: $1.8 billion
- Owners: American Electric Power/SWEPCO (73%), Arkansas Electric Cooperative Corporation (12%), East Texas Electric Cooperative (8%), Oklahoma Municipal Power Authority (7%)
- Operator: AEP/SWEPCO

Thermal power station
- Primary fuel: Sub-bituminous pulverized coal

Power generation
- Units operational: 1
- Nameplate capacity: 650 MW

The John W. Turk Jr. Coal Plant is a 650 megawatt coal-fired power station in Fulton, Arkansas, operated by the American Electric Power subsidiary Southwestern Electric Power Company (SWEPCO). It provides power to customers in Arkansas, Louisiana, and Texas.

Named for former SWEPCO president and CEO John W. Turk Jr., the plant came online in 2012 as the first sustained "ultra"-supercritical coal plant in the United States, reaching boiler temperatures above 1,112 °F (600 °C) and pressures above 4,500 psi (310 bar). The plant relies on low-sulfur coal from the Powder River Basin.

Its construction was embroiled in regulatory roadblocks and environmental lawsuits. At a total cost of $1.8 billion, it was the most expensive project in Arkansas history.

== Litigation ==
Though first proposed in 2006, lawsuits aiming to protect the environment surrounding the project's proposed site delayed its groundbreaking. Plaintiffs cited potential damage to the area's fish, wildlife, grasslands, and cypress and hardwood groves.

As part of a settlement reached in December 2011 with the Sierra Club, the National Audubon Society, Audubon Arkansas and the Hempstead County Hunting Club, American Electric Power/SWEPCO agreed to close one of the 528-megawatt generating units at its J. Robert Welsh Power Plant in Texas by the end of 2016 and purchase 400 megawatts of renewable energy capacity by the end of 2014.

The settlement also required the company to contribute $8 million to The Nature Conservancy, $2 million to the Arkansas Community Foundation, and reimburse $2 million in legal fees. American Electric Power/SWEPCO agreed to never install additional generating units at the plant or build another coal-fired facility within 30 miles (48 km).

SWEPCO announced in January 2012 it had reached 20-year agreements to purchase 359 megawatts of wind power from sources in Oklahoma, Texas, and Kansas, more than quadrupling its wind power portfolio. The Oklahoma Municipal Power Authority, 7 percent owner of the Turk plant, entered a 25-year agreement in 2012 to purchase 49 megawatts of wind power capacity.

== Generation ==
American Electric Power/SWEPCO estimates the plant's ultra-supercritical combustion achieves between 39 and 40 percent efficiency. To overcome material stress from the plant's high pressure and temperature, engineers used new nickel and chrome alloys in the boiler and its components.

== Emissions and waste ==
Compared to a conventional coal-fired plant of similar output, AEP/SWEPCO estimated the Turk facility's ultra-supercritical process would use 180,000 fewer tons of coal and produce 320,000 fewer tons of carbon dioxide annually. Ash and other solid waste is disposed of at an on-site landfill lined with a synthetic material.

Emissions controls at the plant include selective catalytic reduction for nitrous oxide, flue-gas desulfurization for sulfur dioxide, activated carbon injection for mercury and pulse-jet fabric filter baghouse for particulate matter.

=== Groundwater pollution ===
In a report published in 2019, the Environmental Integrity Project found levels of lithium in groundwater near the plant are three times of safe limits. Utilities disputed the methodology used in the study.

=== Greenhouse gases ===
According to data reported to the EPA, the plant released 4,011,207 metric tons of greenhouse gases in 2017. The emissions in metric tons comprised:

- Carbon dioxide: 3,979,770
- Methane: 11,500
- Nitrous oxide: 19,937

== Recognition ==
POWER Magazine awarded the plant its 2013 Plant of the Year Award.

In 2015, Peabody Energy recognized the plant for the lowest nitrous oxide emission rate and lowest heat rate among U.S. coal-fired power plants.

== See also ==
- List of power stations in Arkansas
