= Craighead Electric Cooperative =

- Industry: Rural electrical cooperative
- Founded: 1937
- Headquarters: Jonesboro, AR
- Number of employees: 110
- Website: craigheadelectric.coop

Craighead Electric Cooperative is a member-owned not-for-profit rural electric utility cooperative headquartered in Jonesboro, Arkansas, United States with district offices in Paragould, and Walnut Ridge, Arkansas. A not-for-profit electric cooperative differs from a for profit investor owned electric company in a number of ways including capital credit refunds. For example, the cooperative in 2006 refunded $679,728 for the years 1976 and 1977.

The Cooperative was organized in 1937 and the first 75 miles (121 km) of power lines were energized in November 1938. In 1942 the cooperative pooled its resources with the other sixteen Arkansas power cooperatives to form a statewide association, Arkansas Electric Cooperatives, Inc., (AECI). In 1949, it became a member of the Arkansas Electric Cooperative Corporation.

The Cooperative serves portions of seven counties in the state of Arkansas, in a territory generally north and east of Jonesboro: Craighead, Crittenden, Greene, Independence, Lawrence, Poinsett, and Randolph.

The Cooperative has more than 4,800 miles (7,700 km) of distribution lines, 18 substations, and services 30,000 meters. In 2009, a winter storm damaged roughly 8,000 of the cooperative's utility poles causing power outages to 25,000 customers.
