= Petit Jean Electric Cooperative =

Petit Jean Electric Cooperative is a non-profit rural electric utility cooperative headquartered in Clinton, Arkansas, with a district office in Marshall, Arkansas.

The Cooperative was organized in October 1940, but due to World War II never laid any new power lines. Instead, in September 1942 it would purchase the privately held Clinton Light and Ice Company, consisting of 780 accounts over 61 miles (98 km) of power line (the former owner, Clarence Tingley, would later serve as Superintendent of the Cooperative). The Cooperative would then relocate to Clinton as a result of the purchase. Later, in October 1945, the Cooperative would purchase 22.2 miles (35.7 km) of line from Arkansas Power & Light (now a subsidiary of Entergy), nearly tripling the size of the Cooperative's territory, and in the 1950s extended to the Marshall area by purchasing the service area power lines from Carroll Electric Cooperative.

The Cooperative serves a territory generally surrounding Clinton and Marshall.

The Cooperative has more than 3,092 miles (4,976 km) of distribution lines, and services 17,600 accounts.
