= First Electric Cooperative =

Non-profit rural electrical utility cooperative

- Type: Non-profit rural electric
- Industry: Power utility
- Founded: 1937
- Headquarters: Jacksonville, Arkansas, U.S.
- Website: firstelectric.coop

First Electric Cooperative is a non-profit rural electric utility cooperative headquartered in Jacksonville, Arkansas. The cooperative was organized April 26, 1937, as the first electric cooperative in Arkansas under the federal Rural Electrification Act of 1935. The cooperative energized its first lines April 15, 1938, near Jacksonville with three employees and 150 members.

First Electric now serves portions of 18 counties in the state of Arkansas, in central and south-east Arkansas. As well as its Jacksonville headquarters and district office, it has district offices in Bryant, Heber Springs, Perryville and Stuttgart. The Bryant office serves portions of Garland, Grant, southern Pulaski and Saline counties. The Heber Springs office serves portions of Cleburne, Independence, Stone and White counties. The Jacksonville district office serves portions of Faulkner, Lonoke, Prairie, northern Pulaski, and White counties. The Perryville office serves portions of Conway, Perry, western Pulaski and Yell counties. The Stuttgart office serves portions of Arkansas, Jefferson, Lonoke, Monroe and Prairie counties.

As of July 2023, the cooperative had 10,373 miles of distribution lines, 50 substations and services more than 103,440 member accounts. It is Arkansas' second-largest rural electric cooperative, and one of the 30 largest of the United States' 900 electric cooperatives.

First Electric is a member of the Arkansas Electric Cooperative Corporation, an electrical generation and distribution cooperative headquartered in Little Rock, Arkansas. AECC sells wholesale energy to First Electric and 16 other member cooperatives in Arkansas. First Electric is one of more than 900 members of the National Rural Electric Cooperative Association. NRECA is the national service organization for more than 900 not-for-profit rural electric cooperatives and public power districts.

First Electric states that it supports fuel diversity, including power generation through a mix of energy resources including renewable energy, nuclear power, natural gas and coal. The utility claims a balanced approach to power generation will help ensure affordable, reliable sources of power.

== Community service ==
Its community projects include Operation Round-Up, Guatemala mission, college scholarships and an annual youth tour to Washington, D.C.

First Electric is among several Arkansas electric cooperatives participating in the Guatemala mission by donating materials, labor and funds. The project first provided electric service to more than 450 rural Guatemala residents in 2013. In 2018 linemen returned to Guatemala to further their volunteer service. Cooperative crews are helping build electric distribution line, infrastructure and helped train local line workers.

In Operation Round-Up, members volunteer to have monthly bills rounded up to the next higher dollar figure. Operation Roundup's trust fund is overseen by a nine-member board chosen by the utility's board of directors. Since 1998, Operation Round-Up has awarded more than $1.07 million in donations to nonprofit organizations and more than $100,000 in college scholarships.
