= Clay County Electric Cooperative =

Clay County Electric Cooperative is a non-profit rural electric utility cooperative headquartered in Corning, Arkansas and founded in 1938. The cooperative serves customers in Clay County, Arkansas and Randolph County, Arkansas.

In addition to electric service, the cooperative also offers long-distance telephone service.
