= South Central Arkansas Electric Cooperative =

Arkansas (USA) non-profit electric cooperative

- Company type: Non-profit rural electric
- Industry: Power utility
- Founded: 1940
- Headquarters: Arkadelphia, Arkansas, U.S.
- Website: South Central Arkansas Electric Cooperative

South Central Arkansas Electric Cooperative is a non-profit rural electric utility cooperative headquartered in Arkadelphia, Arkansas. It was organized July 31, 1940. It serves portions of eight counties in the state of Arkansas, in a territory generally west and southwest of Arkadelphia.

== Overview ==
As of September 2005, the Cooperative had more than 1,770 miles of distribution lines, 9 substations and services 7,300 member accounts. Members are served in Clark, Dallas, Hempstead, Howard, Hot Spring, Montgomery, Nevada and Pike counties. The office is at 1140 Main Street, Arkadelphia.

In 2025, South Central Connect, the broadband subsidiary of the cooperative, received an $8.7 million grant to complete fiber buildout in Montgomery County as part of Arkansas’s ARPA-fueled broadband expansion initiative.

== Community ==
Each spring, South Central Arkansas Electric Cooperative selects two high school juniors to attend a tour to Washington, D.C., sponsored annually by Electric Cooperatives of Arkansas. Winners are selected through an essay contest. Applicants must be high school juniors and members of the Cooperative.
