= C&L Electric Cooperative =

Non-profit utility cooperative in Arkansas, US

C&L Electric Cooperative Corporation is a non-profit rural electric utility cooperative in Arkansas, in the United States. It is headquartered in Star City, Arkansas, with district offices in Dumas and Sheridan, Arkansas.

The Cooperative was organized in 1938 and the first power lines were energized in December 1939.

The Cooperative serves portions of eight counties in the state of Arkansas, in a territory generally surrounding Star City: Bradley, Cleveland, Dallas, Desha, Drew, Grant, Jefferson, and Lincoln.

As of July 2018, the Cooperative maintains more than 4,385 miles of power lines, and services 22,192 members.
