= Mississippi County Electric Cooperative =

The Mississippi County Electric Cooperative is a non-profit rural electric utility cooperative headquartered in Blytheville, Arkansas.

The Cooperative was organized in 1938.

The Cooperative's territory is wholly located within Mississippi County, Arkansas.

Currently (as of September 2005) the Cooperative has more than 549 miles of distribution lines, and services 4,276 meters. Its customer base includes Arkansas' two largest steel mills, both of which are owned wholly or partially by Nucor Corporation.
