= North Arkansas Electric Cooperative =

North Arkansas Electric Cooperative is a non-profit rural electric utility cooperative headquartered in Salem, Arkansas, with district offices in Ash Flat and Mountain Home, Arkansas.

Currently (as of September 2005) the Cooperative has more than 4,500 miles of distribution lines, 25 substations and services 33,000 accounts. It considers itself the fifth-largest rural electric cooperative in Arkansas.
