= Carroll Electric Cooperative =

American non-profit electric utility cooperative

Carroll Electric Cooperative is a non-profit rural electric utility cooperative headquartered in Berryville, Arkansas, with district offices in Bentonville, Huntsville, and Jasper, Arkansas. The company also owns and publishes the Arkansas Living magazine which was started in 1942 and is sent out for free monthly to its customers.

The Cooperative was organized in 1937 and the first power lines were energized in October 1938.

The Cooperative serves portions of eleven counties in the states of Arkansas and Missouri, in a territory generally located in the northwest corner of Arkansas:

- Arkansas: Benton, Boone, Carroll, Madison, Newton, Pope, and Washington
- Missouri: Barry, McDonald, Stone, and Taney

Currently (as of June 2019) the Cooperative has 250,000 customers.
