= Farmers Electric Cooperative (Arkansas) =

Farmers Electric Cooperative Corporation is a non-profit rural electric utility cooperative headquartered in Newport, Arkansas.

The Cooperative was organized in 1937 and the first power lines were energized in August 1938.

The Cooperative serves portions of four counties in the state of Arkansas, in a territory generally surrounding Newport: Independence, Jackson, Poinsett, and Woodruff.

Currently (as of September 2005) the Cooperative has more than 975 miles of distribution lines, and services 5,262 members.
