= Ouachita Electric Cooperative =

Ouachita Electric Cooperative Corporation is a non-profit rural electric utility cooperative headquartered in Camden, Arkansas, with a district office in Hampton, Arkansas.

The Cooperative was organized in 1938.

The Cooperative serves portions of five counties in the state of Arkansas, in a territory generally surrounding Camden and Hampton.
