= Rich Mountain Electric Cooperative =

Rich Mountain Electric Cooperative is a non-profit rural electric utility cooperative headquartered in Mena, Arkansas, United States with a district office in Dierks, Arkansas.

The cooperative serves portions of six counties in the states of Arkansas and Oklahoma, in a territory generally surrounding Mena.

As of September 2005, the Cooperative had more than 1,500 miles of power lines, and served over 7,600 customers.
