= Ozarks Electric Cooperative =

Non-profit utility cooperative serving Arkansas and Oklahoma, U.S.

Ozarks Electric Cooperative is a non-profit rural electric utility cooperative headquartered in Fayetteville, Arkansas, with district offices in Springdale, Arkansas, Stilwell, Oklahoma, and Westville, Oklahoma.

The Cooperative was organized in 1937 and the first 134 miles (216 km) of power lines were energized in November 1938 to 245 meters.

The Cooperative serves portions of counties in the states of Arkansas, and Oklahoma, in a territory generally surrounding Fayetteville. This includes the Arkansas counties of Benton, Crawford, Franklin, Madison, and Washington.

As of 2016, the Cooperative has more than 6,000 miles (9,700 km) of power lines, and serves more than 71,000 meters.
