= Arkansas Valley Electric Cooperative =

Arkansas Valley Electric Cooperative Corporation is a not-for-profit Corporation headquartered in Ozark, AR. District offices are located in Waldron and Van Buren, AR. and Pocola, OK.

The Cooperative was organized in 1937 by a group of farmers and businessmen from Crawford, Logan and Johnson Counties in west-central Arkansas. It has since expanded to ten counties in Arkansas and three in Oklahoma.

The first 57 miles of power line were energized in December 1938 to provide electric service to 114 meters. The average member had a monthly electric bill of $3.00 and used approximately 30 kWh (kilowatt hours).

The Cooperative purchased nearly 1.2 billion kilowatt hours of electricity during 2009. The system peak demand of 327 Megawatts (million watts) was set in July 2011. The Cooperative purchases its power wholesale from Arkansas Electric Cooperatives Corporation, Little Rock, AR.

Currently the Cooperative has more than 8,100 miles of distribution lines, 33 electrical substations, and more than 56,000 electric services. The total electric plant of AVECC is valued at $173 million and member equity is 31%.
