= Utility cooperative =

Type of cooperative

A utility cooperative is a type of cooperative that is tasked with the delivery of a public utility such as electricity, water or telecommunications to its members. Profits are either reinvested for infrastructure or distributed to members in the form of "patronage" or "capital credits", which are dividends paid on a member's investment in the cooperative.

Each customer is a member and owner of the business. This means that all members have equal individual authority, unlike investor-owned utilities where the extent of individual authority is governed by the number of shares held. Like cooperatives operating in other sectors, many utility cooperatives conduct their affairs according to a set of ideals based on the Rochdale Principles. Some utility cooperatives respect the seventh principle, Concern for community, through Operation Roundup schemes, whereby members can voluntarily have their bill rounded to the next currency unit (e.g. $55.37 becomes $56), with the difference (e.g. 63¢) distributed to a fund for local charities.

Many such cooperatives exist in the rural United States and were created by the New Deal to bring electric power and telephone service to rural areas, when the nearest investor-owned utility would not provide service since it believes that there would be insufficient revenue to justify the capital expenditures required. Many electric cooperatives have banded together to form their own wholesale power cooperatives, often called G&Ts for "generation and transmission", to supply their member-owners with electricity.

Many utility cooperatives strive to bring the best service at the lowest possible cost, but the high cost of maintaining the infrastructure that is needed to cover large rural areas without the support of large cities as a rich customer base often causes high prices. However, a few such co-ops have managed to tap into urban markets because of growth into previously rural territory served by the co-ops, and they have proven to be very cost-effective. More recently, established energy co-ops have offered with national coverage. Co-operative Energy in the United Kingdom and Enercoop in France are examples of consumer cooperatives. Other co-ops have formed to concentrate on the generation of renewable energy, especially wind energy co-operatives.

== Electric cooperatives ==
=== North America ===
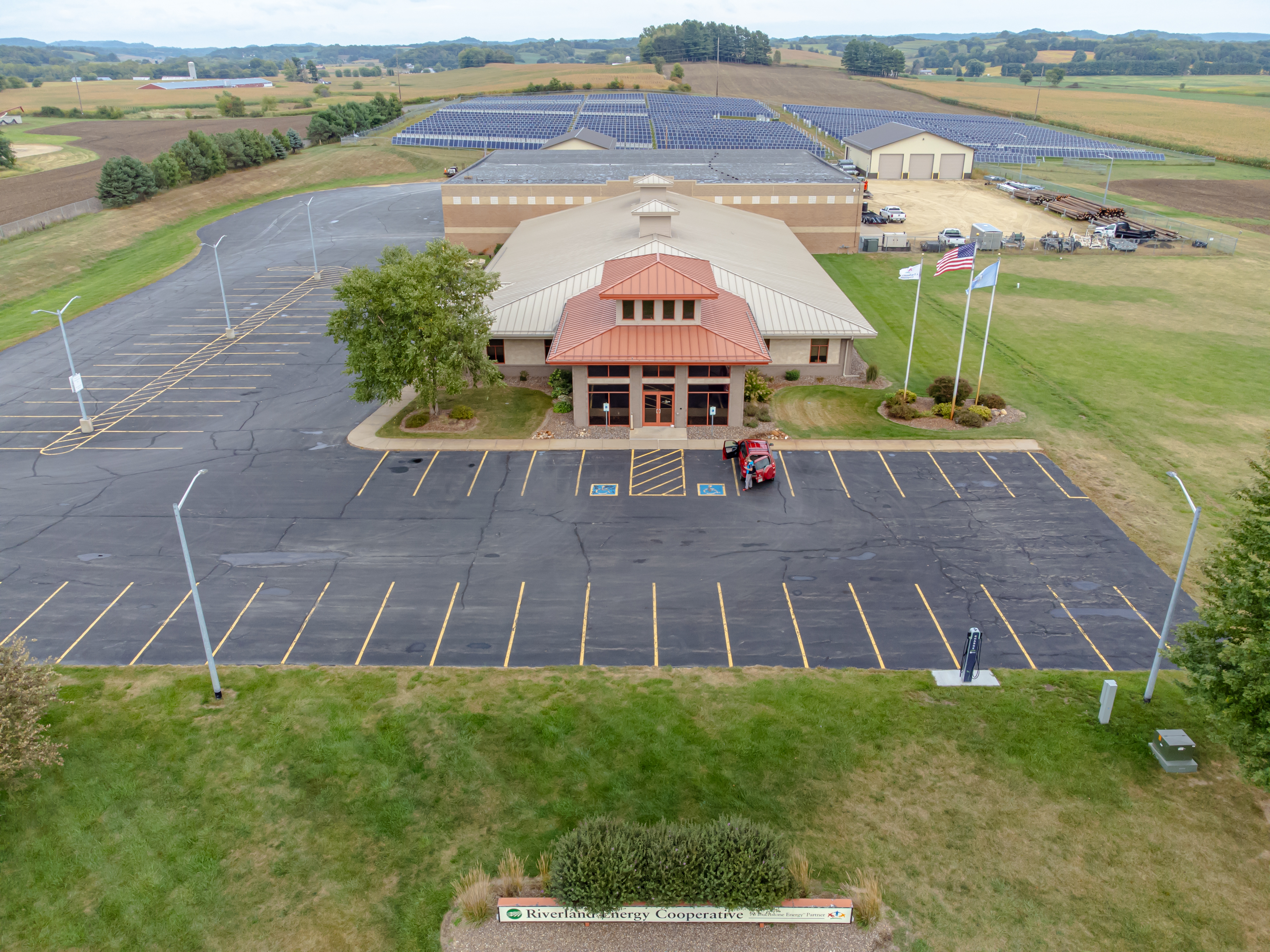
Riverland Energy Cooperative near Arcadia, Wisconsin

There are two types of electric cooperatives: distribution cooperatives and generation and transmission (G&T) cooperatives. Distribution electric cooperatives serve end-users, such as residences and businesses, who make up their membership. Generation and transmission cooperatives typically sell wholesale power to distribution cooperatives and are cooperative federations owned by their member co-ops.

==== Naming ====
Most electric cooperatives in the United States include the phrase "electric cooperative" in their name, which makes it easy to identify their organization. Most cooperatives have a name that identifies or explains some aspect of their service area. For example, Bluebonnet Electric Cooperative in Texas is named after the Bluebonnet which grows naturally in its service area. Lyntegar Electric Cooperative, also in Texas, is named for the three original counties that came together to organize it, Lynn County, Terry County, and Garza County, and A&N Electric Cooperative in Virginia, is named so because it serves Accomack County and Northampton County. For years after the Rural Electrification Administration was established, many rural residents in the US called cooperatives "REA", regardless of their actual name, and would in turn say they were served by REA instead of the cooperative name if asked who their electric provider was. Today, some cooperatives, either by choice or by the guidance of state charter laws, carry a variation of the cooperative name. These include:

- Electric Cooperative Association
- Electric Membership Cooperative (EMC) - used in many states, such as Indiana, North Carolina, Georgia, Tennessee, and Alabama
- Electric Power Association (EPA) - mainly used in Mississippi
- Energy Cooperative
- Power Cooperative
- Rural Electric Association
- Rural Electric Cooperative
- Rural Electric Cooperative Corporation (RECC) - mainly used in Kentucky
- Rural Electric Membership Corporation (REMC)

Several states have another variation of the utility cooperative, known as Public Power Districts (PPDs) in Nebraska and Public Utility Districts (PUDs) in Oregon and Washington. In both cases, the laws that created these "quasi-cooperative" utilities were created with the specific intent of taking over territory being served by privately owned power companies in those states. Nebraska's conversion from a mixture of power companies serving the state to a public power empire spanned the 1940s (the last privately owned utility line into the state being cut on December 29, 1949), with the creation of the PUDs in the Pacific Northwest starting about the same time and continuing with varying degrees of success over the following two decades. The key difference between a PPD/PUD and a cooperative is that PPDs/PUDs are publicly controlled by residents of a state or local area and run more like a municipal power system than a cooperative system. A cooperative is owned and operated by the customers they serve within their designated service area. Cooperative owners have voting rights to elect the cooperative's board members each year and generally have more say in the operations than other utility forms.

==== Peer associations ====
Small cooperatives often band together to achieve economies of scale, share expertise and stand together on regulatory issues. There are several statewide (and in Canada, province-wide) associations of cooperatives, including Kentucky and Nova Scotia. A cooperative of cooperatives, in which several smaller level cooperatives come together to form a bigger higher level cooperative, is called the secondary cooperative. Secondary cooperative is different from the association. Cooperative of secondary cooperative is called tertiary cooperatives. For example, each village may have a village level cooperative. Several village cooperatives may form a district level secondary cooperative in which village level cooperatives have a share. Several district level cooperatives may form a state level tertiary cooperative, and so on.

=== Europe ===
In 2013, REScoop, a European federation of energy co-operatives, both producers' and consumers', was launched. It has 11 members in seven countries.

In the UK, Co-operative Energy was established in 2010 by Midcounties Co-operative and supplies electricity and gas across the country.

=== Philippines ===
Electricity in most provinces of the Philippines are served by cooperatives, and all belong to the distribution sector, which serve the end customers, who own the cooperative themselves. Electric cooperatives in the Philippines are overseen by the government through the National Electrification Administration (NEA), and rates set by the cooperatives are regulated by the Energy Regulatory Commission (ERC), an agency belonging to the Department of Energy (DOE).

== Telephone cooperatives ==
Telephone cooperatives have today expanded beyond their historical role of providing fixed line telephone services, by also offering broadband and often cable TV services (via DSL, coaxial cable or optical fibre), and mobile/wireless services.

=== United Kingdom ===
The UK has a single telephone co-operative, The Phone Co-op, which provides fixed, mobile telephone and internet services, including web hosting and broadband. It is 100% owned by its customer-members who democratically control the business and who share in its profits. The co-op is a social enterprise and was awarded the title of UK customer-facing social enterprise of the year 2015 at the UK Social Enterprise Awards. The business is a living wage employer and is accredited to hold the Fair Tax Mark. It has over 30,000 customers.

=== United States ===
There are approximately 260 telephone cooperatives in the US, together employing approximately 23,000 and annual revenues of $3.9B. Many were formed during the New Deal in the 1930s, but some date to the turn of the 20th century. Most operate only one or a small number of exchanges, typically as an Incumbent Local Exchange Carrier (ILEC), but some have become regional players through merger and now operate as Competitive Local Exchange Carriers (CLEC).

== See also ==
- Municipal utility district
- National Rural Electric Cooperative Association
- Public utility district
- Rural Utilities Service
- Touchstone Energy
