= List of energy cooperatives =

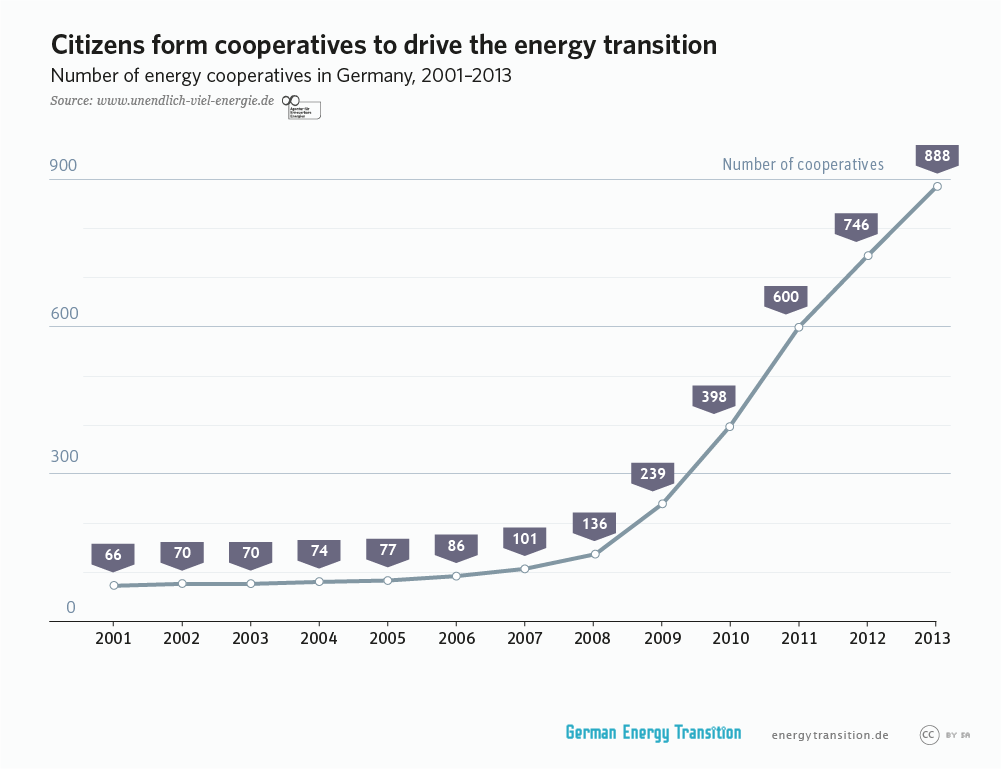
Number of energy cooperatives in Germany

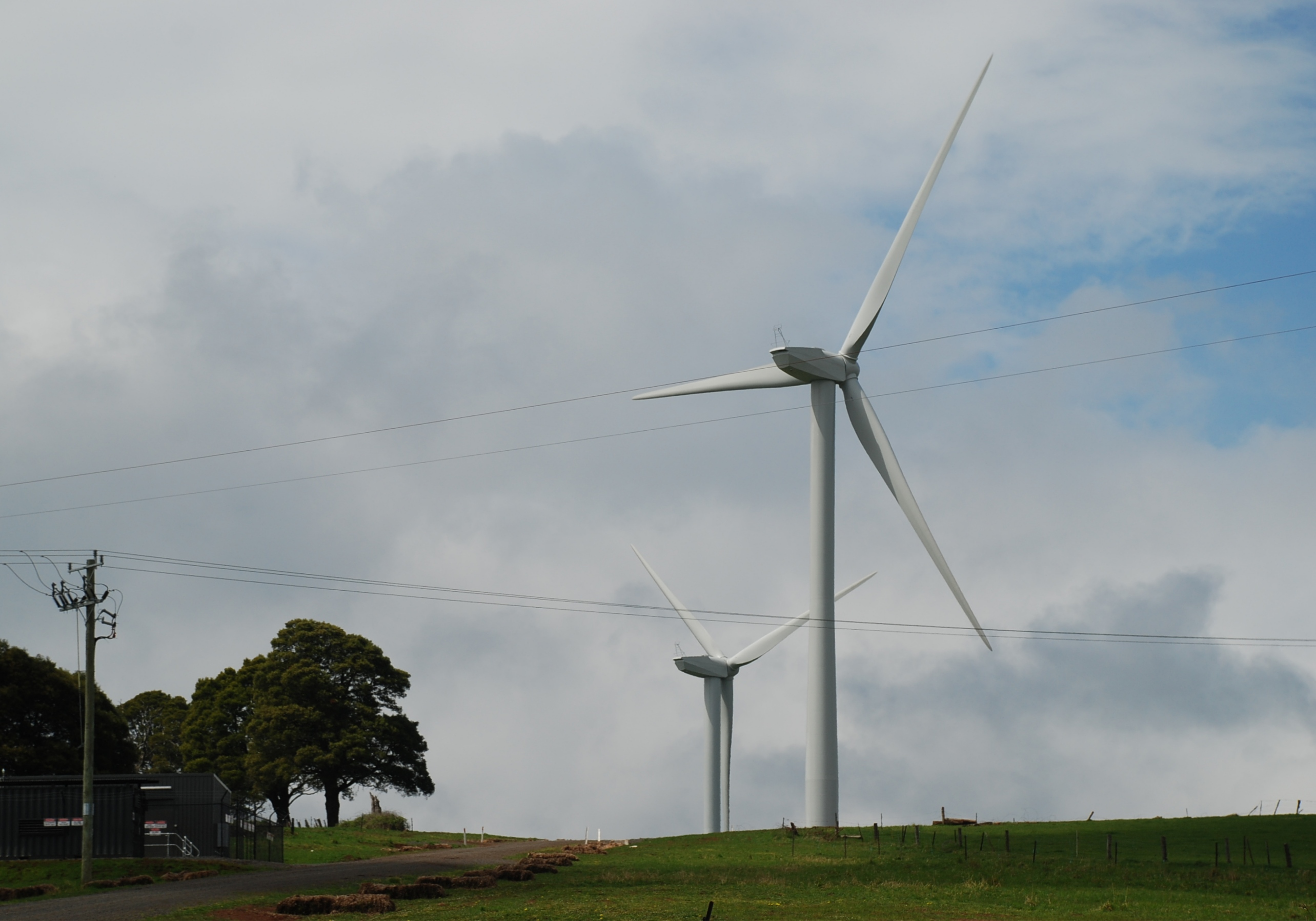
Turbines at the Hepburn Wind Project

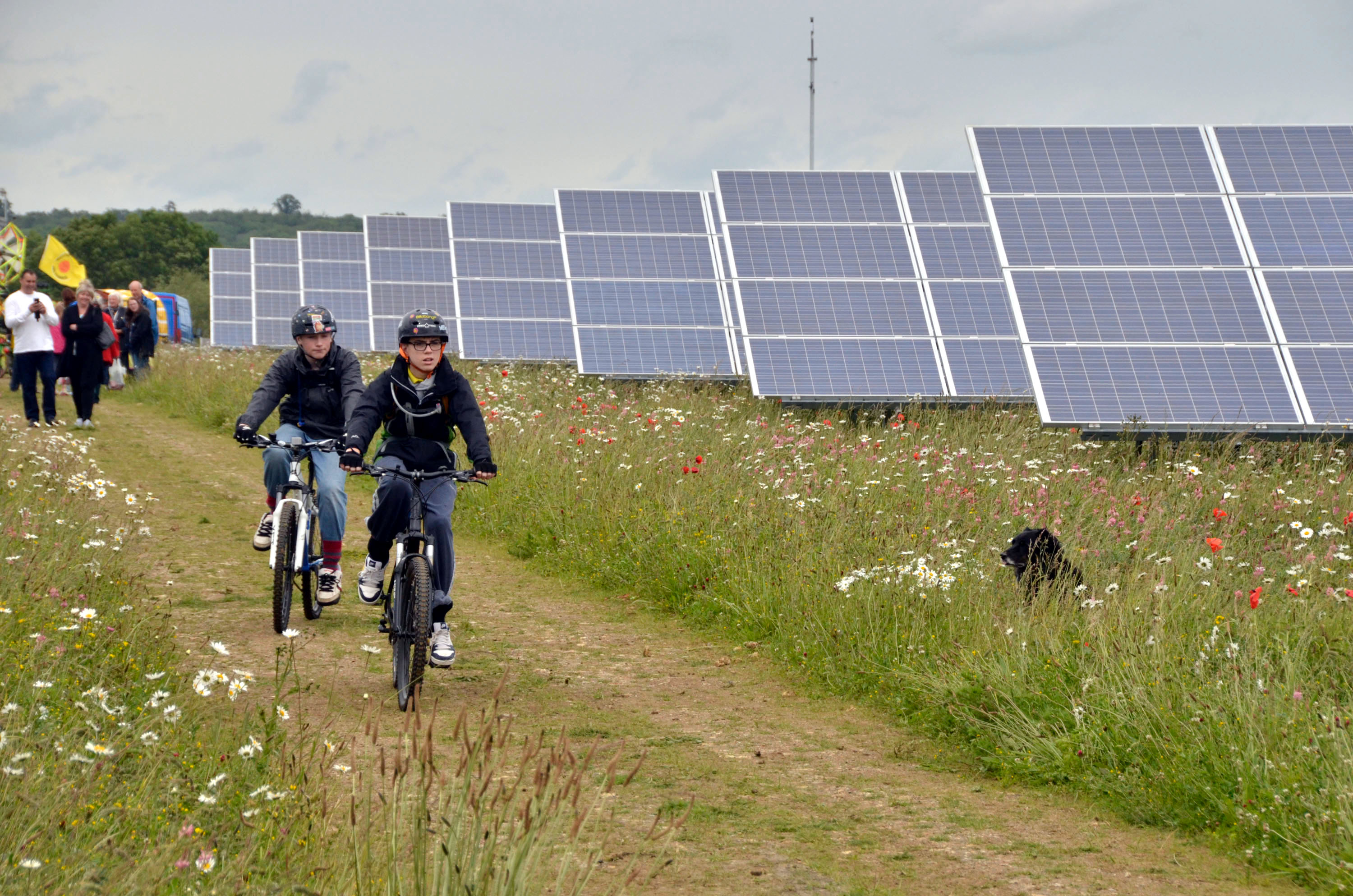
Visitors at a Westmill Solar Co-operative open day at Westmill Solar Park

This is a list of energy cooperatives. A cooperative is an autonomous association of persons who voluntarily cooperate for their mutual social, economic, and cultural benefit. Cooperatives include non-profit community organizations and businesses that are owned and managed by the people who use its services (a consumer cooperative) or by the people who work there (a worker cooperative) or by the people who live there (a housing cooperative), hybrids such as worker cooperatives that are also consumer cooperatives or credit unions, multi-stakeholder cooperatives such as those that bring together civil society and local actors to deliver community needs, and second and third tier cooperatives whose members are other cooperatives.

A 2009 study found that 23% of the newly founded cooperatives in Germany were in the energy sector. These cooperatives primarily operate wind farms, bioenergy and photovoltaic farms with local and regional scope.

== Energy cooperatives ==
=== Australia ===
- Hepburn Wind Project

=== Bolivia ===
- Cooperativa Rural de Electrificacion R.L. (CRE)

=== Belgium ===
- BeauVent
- BronsGroen
- Campina Energie
- CoopStroom
- Denderstroom
- Druifkracht
- ECoOB
- EnerGent
- Ecopower
- Elecoo cv
- Klimaan
- MegaWattPuur
- PajoPower
- Stroomvloed
- Vlaskracht
- Volterra
- Wase Wind
- Zonnewind
- ZuidtrAnt

=== Canada ===
- Ag Energy Co-operative
- Toronto Renewable Energy Co-operative
- WindShare

=== France ===
- Enercoop

=== Germany ===
In 2014 Germany had close to 1000 energy cooperatives, among them:

- Bürger Energie Region Regensburg eG (BERR)
- Bürgerwerke eG
- BürgerEnergie Buxtehude eG
- BürgerEnergieAltmark eG
- EnergieWende Erlangen und Erlangen-Höchstadt E- WERG eG
- Elektrizitätswerke Schönau
- Greenpeace Energy
- HEG Heidelberger Energiegenossenschaft eG
- Neue Energien West- NEW eG
- Raiffeisen Bürger–Energiegenossenschaft Bliesgau eG
- Regionalstrom Franken eG
- Ur- Strom BürgerEnergieGenossenschaft Mainz eG
- Windfang eG Frauenenergiegemeinschaft

=== Portugal ===
- Coopérnico

=== Serbia ===
- Elektropionir, Beograd
- Sunčani krovovi, Šabac

=== Spain ===
- Som Energia

=== Switzerland ===
- Elektra Birseck Münchenstein

=== Turkey ===
As of 2022 there are 9.

- Altınoluk Yenilenebilir Enerji Üretim Kooperatifi
- İzmir Enerji Kooperatifi
- Kayseri Mobilyacılar Yenilenebilir Enerji Kooperatifi
- Troya Yenilenebilir Enerji Kooperatifi

=== United Kingdom ===
- AWEL
- Baywind Energy Co-operative
- Brighton Energy Co-operative
- Co-op Energy
- Energy4All
- Fetlar Wind
- MaidEnergy Coop
- Westmill Solar Co-operative
- Westmill Wind Farm Co-operative

=== USA ===
- A&N Electric Cooperative
- Allegheny Electric Cooperative
- Arkansas Electric Cooperative Corporation
- Arkansas Valley Electric Cooperative
- Bailey County Electric Cooperative
- Basin Electric Power Cooperative
- Bluebonnet Electric Cooperative
- Bowie-Cass Electric Cooperative
- Brazos Electric Power Cooperative
- C&L Electric Cooperative
- Cape Hatteras Electric Cooperative
- Capital Electric Cooperative
- Carroll Electric Cooperative
- Cass County Electric Cooperative
- Cavalier Rural Electric Cooperative
- Central Power Electric Cooperative
- Central Texas Electric Cooperative
- Cherokee County Electric Cooperative
- Choptank Electric Cooperative
- Clay County Electric Cooperative
- Cloverland Electric Cooperative
- Coleman County Electric Cooperative
- Comanche Electric Cooperative
- Concho Valley Electric Cooperative
- Cooperative Energy
- Corn Belt Power Cooperative
- Craighead Electric Cooperative
- Dakota Valley Electric Cooperative
- Dairyland Power Cooperative
- Deaf Smith Electric Cooperative
- Deep East Texas Electric Cooperative
- Delaware Electric Cooperative
- EnergyUnited
- Farmers Electric Cooperative (Arkansas)
- Farmers Electric Cooperative (Texas)
- Fayette Electric Cooperative
- First Electric Cooperative
- Fort Belknap Electric Cooperative
- Fox Islands Electric Cooperative
- Grayson-Collin Electric Cooperative
- Great River Energy
- Greenbelt Electric Cooperative
- Jackson Electric Membership Corporation
- Kauaʻi Island Utility Cooperative
- KEM Electric Cooperative
- McKenzie Electric Cooperative
- McLean Electric Cooperative
- Minnkota Power Cooperative
- Mississippi County Electric Cooperative
- Mor-Gran-Sou Electric Cooperative
- Nodak Electric Cooperative
- North Arkansas Electric Cooperative
- North Central Electric Cooperative
- Northern Plains Electric Cooperative
- Oglethorpe Power
- Old Dominion Electric Cooperative
- Oliver-Mercer Electric Cooperative
- Ouachita Electric Cooperative
- Ozarks Electric Cooperative
- Palmetto Electric
- Pedernales Electric Cooperative
- Petit Jean Electric Cooperative
- PowerSouth Energy Cooperative
- Rich Mountain Electric Cooperative
- Sawnee EMC
- South Central Arkansas Electric Cooperative
- Southern Maryland Electric Cooperative
- Verendrye Electric Cooperative
- Vineyard Power Co-operative
- Wabash Valley Power Association
- West Florida Electric Cooperative
- Woodruff Electric Cooperative

== See also ==
- List of cooperatives
- List of co-operative federations
- List of employee-owned companies
- List of food cooperatives
- List of renewable energy companies by country
- List of retailers' cooperatives
- List of worker cooperatives
