= List of North Dakota non-profit organizations =

Location of North Dakota

This list includes notable non-profit organizations with primary headquarters located in the state. The industry and sector follow the Industry Classification Benchmark taxonomy. Organizations which have ceased operations are included and noted as defunct.

Notable companies Status: P=Private, S=State; A=Active, D=Defunct
Name	Industry	Sector	Headquarters	Founded	Notes	Status	
Altru Health System	Health care	Health care providers	Grand Forks	1997	Hospitals and health care	P	A
Association for Computer Aided Design In Architecture	Technology	Computer-aided architectural design	Fargo	1981		P	A
Basin Electric Power Cooperative	Utilities	Conventional electricity	Bismarck	1961	Electrical cooperative	P	A
Dakota Coal Company	Utilities	Conventional electricity	Bismarck	1991	Part of Basin Electric Power Cooperative	P	A
Dakota Gasification Company	Utilities	Gas distribution	Beulah	1984	Part of Basin Electric Power Cooperative	P	A
Missouri Valley Heritage Alliance		Heritage education and tourism	Bismarck	1982		P	A
State Historical Society of North Dakota	Museums	Heritage education and tourism	Bismarck			S	A

== See also ==
- List of cities in North Dakota
