= Duane Arnold Energy Center =

Nuclear power plant located in Iowa

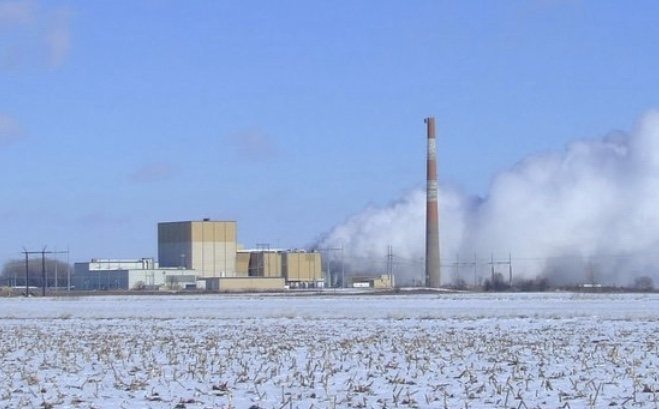
- DAEC in winter (2018)
- Country: United States
- Location: Fayette Township, Linn County, near Palo, Iowa
- Coordinates: 42°6′2″N 91°46′38″W
- Status: Being decommissioned
- Construction began: May 22, 1970
- Commission date: February 1, 1975
- Decommission date: November 2020
- Construction cost: $1.165 billion (2007 USD)
- Owners: NextEra Energy Resources (70%); Central Iowa Power Coop. (20%); Corn Belt Power Coop. (10%)
- Operator: NextEra Energy Resources

Nuclear power station
- Reactor type: Boiling Water Reactor
- Reactor supplier: General Electric
- Cooling towers: 2 × Mechanical Draft
- Cooling source: Cedar River
- Thermal capacity: 1 × 1912 MW_{th}

Power generation
- Units operational: 1 × 601 MW (1 x 615 MW beginning in 2029)
- Make and model: BWR-4 (Mark 1)
- Nameplate capacity: 601 (615 planned for 2029 and later)
- Capacity factor: 99.04% (2017); 78.3% (lifetime)
- Annual net output: 5235 GWh (2021)

External links
- Website: Duane Arnold Energy Center
- Commons: Related media on Commons

The Duane Arnold Energy Center (DAEC), with a single unit boiling water nuclear reactor, was Iowa's only nuclear power plant. It is located on a 500-acre (200 ha) site on the west bank of the Cedar River, two miles (3.2 km) north-northeast of Palo, Iowa, USA, or eight miles (13 km) northwest of Cedar Rapids, Iowa.

DAEC started its commercial operation in February 1975. The plant cooling towers were damaged during the August 2020 Midwest derecho, and repairs were deemed uneconomical, as the plant had already been scheduled for decommissioning in October 2020.

The operator and majority owner is NextEra Energy Resources (70%). The Central Iowa Power Cooperative owns 20% and the Corn Belt Power Cooperative owns 10%.

On October 27, 2025, NextEra Energy Resources and Google announced that they had reached an agreement under which the plant would be restarted in 2029, nine years after its shutdown. This is a move which came as a consequence of the growing demand for reliable and green energy from Google's AI data centers.

== History ==
In the late 1960s, Iowa Electric Light & Power Co. (now Alliant Energy – West), Central Iowa Power Cooperative and Corn Belt Power Cooperative applied for a nuclear plant license with the U.S. Atomic Energy Commission (AEC). On June 17, 1970 a construction permit was granted and work began. The original plan was to complete construction in 40 months at an estimated cost of $250 million.

The energy center was named after Duane Arnold who grew up in Sanborn, Iowa. Arnold was educated at Grinnell College (Grinnell, Iowa) and went to work for Iowa Electric Light and Power Company in 1946. At the time of his death in 1983, at the age of 65, he was chairman of the board and CEO of that company, marrying along the way the daughter, Henrietta, of the previous chairman Sutherland Dows. Arnold was committed to nuclear energy despite the controversy surrounding that source of energy, and oversaw the construction and opening in 1974 of the plant that bears his name. “In my opinion, nuclear power is the most beneficial method of anything we could possibly do to provide energy to our customers in the future,” Mr. Arnold stated in a 1979 interview with the Des Moines Register, about a month after the Three Mile Island accident.

Construction was completed and the reactor reached initial criticality on March 23, 1974. The cost was $50 million over budget. The architect/engineering firm was Bechtel. Commercial operations began on February 1, 1975. The plant was licensed for 1,658 MWt. However, power operations were restricted to 1593MWt (about 535 MWe) until plant modifications were completed in 1985 to use the full licensed capacity.

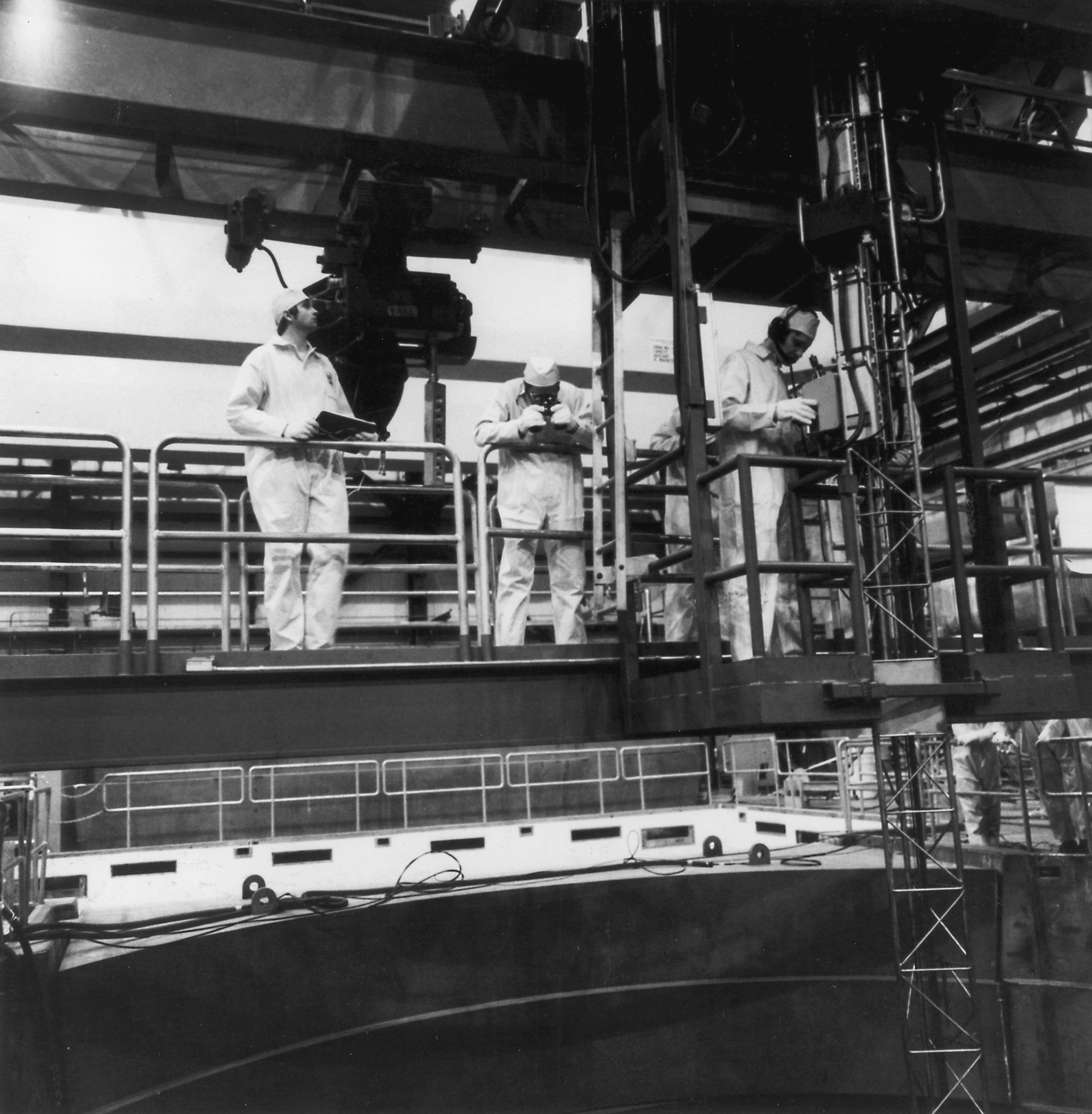
Duane Arnold Energy Center reactor operators lower the first fuel assembly February 27, 1974.

In May 2000, the U.S. Nuclear Regulatory Commission (NRC) granted a license transfer of the DAEC to Nuclear Management Company LLC (NMC). Ownership of the plant remained with Alliant, Central Iowa Power Cooperative and Corn Belt Power Cooperative, but NMC would manage the operation of the plant.

In 2001, a power uprate was approved by the NRC to 1,912 MWt. Scheduled outages since that time have added modifications to the plant that have allowed this power level to be sustained without restrictions or challenges to nuclear or industrial safety.

On January 27, 2006, FPL Energy (a subsidiary of FPL Group) closed the sale of 70 percent ownership from Alliant Energy-Interstate Power and Light. FPL Energy (now NextEra Energy Resources) also assumed control of the operations of the plant from NMC.

DAEC remained online during the 2008 Iowa Flood, when other power plants along the Cedar River shut down. Practice drills for radiological emergencies from the plant allowed the Linn County Emergency Management Agency to better respond to the flooding.

In December 2010, the NRC granted Duane Arnold a 20-year extension license lasting until 2034, taking the plant beyond the life of its original 40-year operating permit.

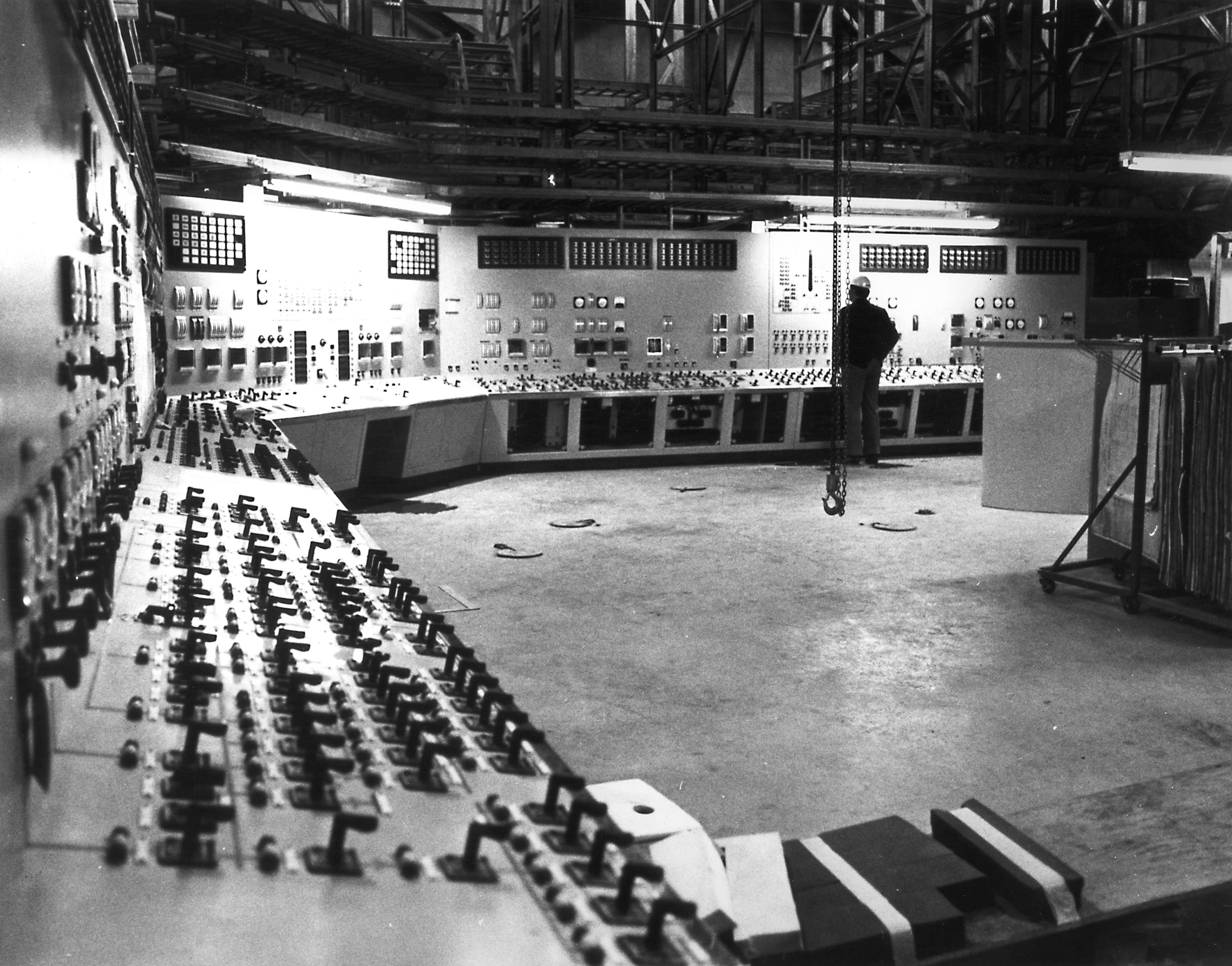
Control room of the Duane Arnold Energy Center circa 1974

In January 2018, NextEra Energy announced that it was unlikely that DAEC would operate beyond 2025. The plant was given a 20-year license extension to 2034 but considered closing after Alliant Energy, which contracts for 70% of the plant's electricity, announced it would instead be buying electricity generated by wind and natural gas.

In July 2018 the expected closure date was amended to October 2020. That same month, NextEra and Alliant Energy agreed to shorten their power purchase agreement by five years in return for a $110 million buyout payment from Alliant, making the expected closure date 2020.

The unit permanently ceased making power on 10 August 2020, due to storm damage from the 130-mile-per-hour (210 km/h) winds during the August 2020 Midwest derecho that leveled the site's cooling towers. Repairs were deemed uneconomical, as the plant had already been scheduled for decommissioning in October 2020. An NRC report of the incident stated that "the vacuum drawn in secondary containment by the standby gas treatment system was slightly below the technical specification limit", indicating that the secondary containment system might not have been fully effective had it been challenged. Thus the incident was considered by nuclear safety experts to be "a close call". "Federal regulators estimated the 2020 storm had a one-in-1,000 chance of causing [reactor] core damage because of safeguards", Inside Climate News reported.

== Restart ==
As of September 2024, John Ketchum, NextEra’s chief executive officer said that, under certain conditions, they are willing to revive the plant, as several data centers were interested.

In early 2025, NextEra Energy Duane Arnold, LLC (NextEra), the licensee for DAEC expressed an interest in returning the plant to an operational status and resuming commercial operation. On August 26, 2025, the Federal Energy Regulatory Commission approved a waiver that clears the way to begin the process to restart the plant.

On Monday, October 27, 2025, NextEra Energy Resources and Google announced that they had reached an agreement under which the 615 megawatt plant would be restarted in 2029, nine years after its shutdown. This is a move which came as a consequence of the growing demand for reliable and green energy from Google's artificial intelligence (AI) data centers. with "excess power strengthening local grid reliability". The cost to prepare the plant for restart was estimated in 2025 at $1.6 billion. According to the contract, which is set to last for 25 years, Google will buy electric energy from the nuclear power plant to power its cloud and AI data centers in the state of Iowa. This will also mean significant economic investments for the region and an estimated at $9 billion in economic benefits for the state.

Reuters reported that the chief executive officer of NextEra said that in support of the purchase agreement with Google, major equipment including a power generator and cooling towers had been ordered. It is the third nuclear reactor to have recently attempted to be restarted in the United States along with Three Mile Island in Pennsylvania and Palisades nuclear power plant in Michigan.

To restart DAEC, NextEra would need to gain NRC approval to restore the licensing basis of the plant to an operational status, return plant components to a status that supports safe operation, and make any upgrades necessary to meet the proposed operational licensing basis. This includes replacing transformers, work on the cooling towers, and building a new administration building. The earliest the plant could reopen is the fourth quarter of 2028.

NRC staff will review the regulatory and licensing documents for the plant, inspect new and restored components necessary to operate, and continue ongoing oversight to ensure sufficiency of all plant systems and programs.

The NRC will engage in several pre-submittal interactions with the DAEC staff on topics related to the potential for restart, and will continue hosting public meetings related to the potential for the DAEC to resume power operations throughout the project.

On September 10, 2026, NextEra announced that it had received approval for a $1.9 billion loan from the US Department of Energy to fund the reopening of the plant.

== Electricity production ==
During last full year of operation in 2019, Duane Arnold generated 5,235 GWh of electricity.

Generation (MWh) of Duane Arnold Energy Center
Year	Jan	Feb	Mar	Apr	May	Jun	Jul	Aug	Sep	Oct	Nov	Dec	Annual (Total)
2001	382,045	355,555	392,652	140,468	25,150	334,683	371,033	346,686	387,653	299,934	385,585	431,278	3,852,722
2002	419,086	389,255	341,087	415,917	362,672	413,091	420,340	297,088	256,177	415,893	414,668	428,684	4,573,958
2003	426,122	174,819	315,195	129,836	428,226	412,413	421,188	419,019	414,515	428,839	47,782	369,703	3,987,657
2004	436,867	406,472	435,372	348,679	430,021	412,259	425,362	424,868	410,790	358,931	405,590	433,737	4,928,948
2005	435,019	389,371	335,065	-3,758	350,046	417,219	430,679	436,209	424,708	440,751	433,268	449,736	4,538,313
2006	447,826	404,283	446,131	408,722	440,321	422,145	428,371	430,874	406,505	442,826	364,834	452,604	5,095,442
2007	447,618	39,080	112,431	389,138	450,516	424,532	446,502	442,377	429,795	445,362	437,740	453,784	4,518,875
2008	457,143	427,569	452,124	440,067	450,927	425,093	440,375	430,578	431,845	451,846	438,708	435,927	5,282,202
2009	394,244	5,357	360,881	399,821	452,957	433,616	452,271	451,155	430,826	400,789	444,369	452,645	4,678,931
2010	448,384	416,381	451,812	365,407	410,842	428,419	444,885	442,437	417,963	323,312	-3,723	304,521	4,450,640
2011	459,664	413,726	452,839	442,326	453,393	429,706	443,408	327,685	439,116	454,320	437,920	461,126	5,215,229
2012	460,908	423,779	454,876	440,969	446,229	431,359	439,675	429,765	395,535	57,036	29,454	337,410	4,346,995
2013	455,731	409,782	458,752	441,980	452,246	431,369	447,624	447,147	430,065	449,169	439,814	457,106	5,320,785
2014	455,018	406,629	454,318	437,773	440,692	427,081	428,435	417,752	389,557	31,449	32,761	231,003	4,152,468
2015	418,537	414,738	453,805	438,786	434,472	431,512	434,796	444,377	430,791	446,190	439,209	456,233	5,243,446
2016	451,835	427,035	453,576	437,215	442,094	329,420	433,422	427,221	402,800	20,861	417,958	459,228	4,702,665
2017	458,665	411,012	456,960	438,264	446,374	430,857	427,637	440,204	428,408	382,121	439,912	453,095	5,213,509
2018	454,361	410,060	450,580	435,050	437,412	421,904	426,623	411,903	137,946	409,884	442,856	456,820	4,895,399
2019	448,846	411,424	453,075	376,139	450,708	432,612	441,330	445,597	429,336	451,258	439,593	455,798	5,235,716
2020	456,363	425,228	452,682	419,860	392,817	289,107	358,850	109,956	0	--	--	--	2,904,863
Not operational from 2021–2028 (estimated)
2029													–

== Plant equipment ==
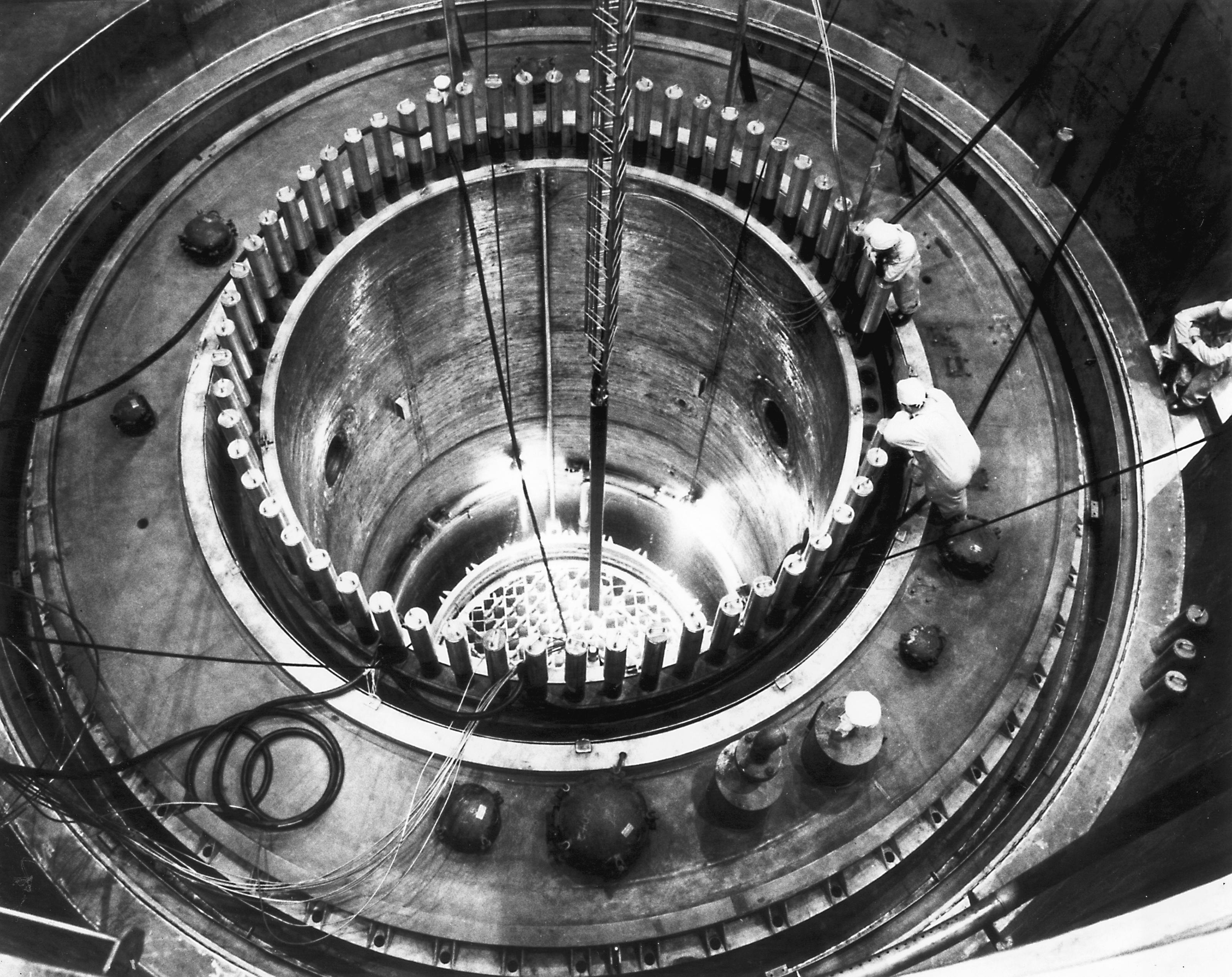
The first fuel bundle at the Duane Arnold Energy Center is lowered into its slot in the nuclear reactor February 27, 1974.

DAEC has a single General Electric GE BWR-4 reactor with a Mark I containment. Twenty-four mechanical draft cooling towers used water from the Cedar River as a heat sink. Facilities exist to process all contaminated water onsite and the DAEC operates with a "zero release" policy to not discharge any contaminated water back to the Cedar River. Facilities exist on site for dry storage of spent fuel with capacity for the entire life of the plant (including license renewal).

The site is scheduled for a 200 MW label capacity solar park with a 75 MW / 300 MWh (4-hour) battery by 2024. Lazard estimates that the wholesale price of replacement electricity will be $0.04/kWh, but a more realistic estimate that takes account of the 11.4% cost of capital reported by NextEra puts the wholesale price at $0.21/kWh, not including operating and decommissioning costs.

== Known problems ==
The Mark I containment was undersized in the original design; the NRC's Harold Denton estimated a 90% probability of explosive failure if the pressure containment system were ever needed in a severe accident. This design flaw may have been the reason that the tsunami in 2011 led to explosions and fire in Fukushima Daiichi nuclear disaster.

== Accident analysis ==
In 2010, the NRC estimated that the risk of an earthquake causing core damage to the reactor at Duane Arnold was 1 in 31,250 each year.

In 2013, in response to the Fukushima Daiichi nuclear disaster, the NRC ordered Duane Arnold "to install a reliable hardened venting capability for pre-core damage and under severe accident conditions, including those involving a breach of the reactor vessel by molten core debris" due to the similarity in reactor design.

== Community impact ==
DAEC employed hundreds of people in the Cedar Rapids area. Some of these workers are represented by the International Brotherhood of Electrical Workers, others by Security, Police and Fire Professionals of America.

Emergency warning towers are maintained by DAEC and provide a means for tornado warnings as well as plant emergencies. The Emergency Planning organization at DAEC works with local, county, and state officials to maintain an emergency plan. The emergency plan can be found in the front of area phonebooks. Drills are conducted on a regular basis in accordance with requirements from the NRC and the U.S. Federal Emergency Management Agency (FEMA).

Tax revenues from DAEC amount to about 1% of the total revenues for Linn County, Iowa. Pleasant Creek Reservoir, a 410-acre (1.7 km^{2}) lake, was developed by Alliant Energy and the Iowa Conservation Commission to provide a recreation area and act as a source of cooling water during times of low flow in the Cedar River.

While the DAEC site covers 500 acres (2.0 km^{2}), only a portion of that is used for power production. The remainder is leased to farmers for crop production or is left in its natural habitat.

In 2014, the Nuclear Energy Institute released a study showing the positive impact of DAEC on the economy and environment. Key findings are listed below.

- DAEC employs nearly 600 full-time workers that earn more than double the average pay of workers in Benton County, Iowa and approximately 55 percent more than those in Linn County, Iowa
- DAEC contributes $246 million of economic activity locally and contributes approximately $255 million to Iowa's economy each year
- For every dollar DAEC spent, the Iowa economy produced $1.27
- DAEC produces more than 1,100 direct and secondary jobs
- DAEC's operation helps avoid the emission of nearly 4 million tons of carbon dioxide annually, which is the equivalent of taking almost 800,000 cars off the road

== Surrounding population ==
The Nuclear Regulatory Commission (NRC) defines two emergency planning zones around nuclear power plants: a plume exposure pathway zone with a radius of 10 miles (16 km), concerned primarily with exposure to, and inhalation of, airborne radioactive contamination, and an ingestion pathway zone of about 50 miles (80 km), concerned primarily with ingestion of food and liquid contaminated by radioactivity.

The 2010 U.S. population within 10 miles (16 km) of the Duane Arnold Energy Center was 107,880, an increase of 8.2 percent in a decade, according to an analysis of U.S. Census data for msnbc.com. The 2010 U.S. population within 50 miles (80 km) was 658,634, an increase of 7.1 percent since 2000. Cities within 50 miles include Cedar Rapids (10 miles to city center).
