= Community wind energy =

Local ratepayer-owned air current power

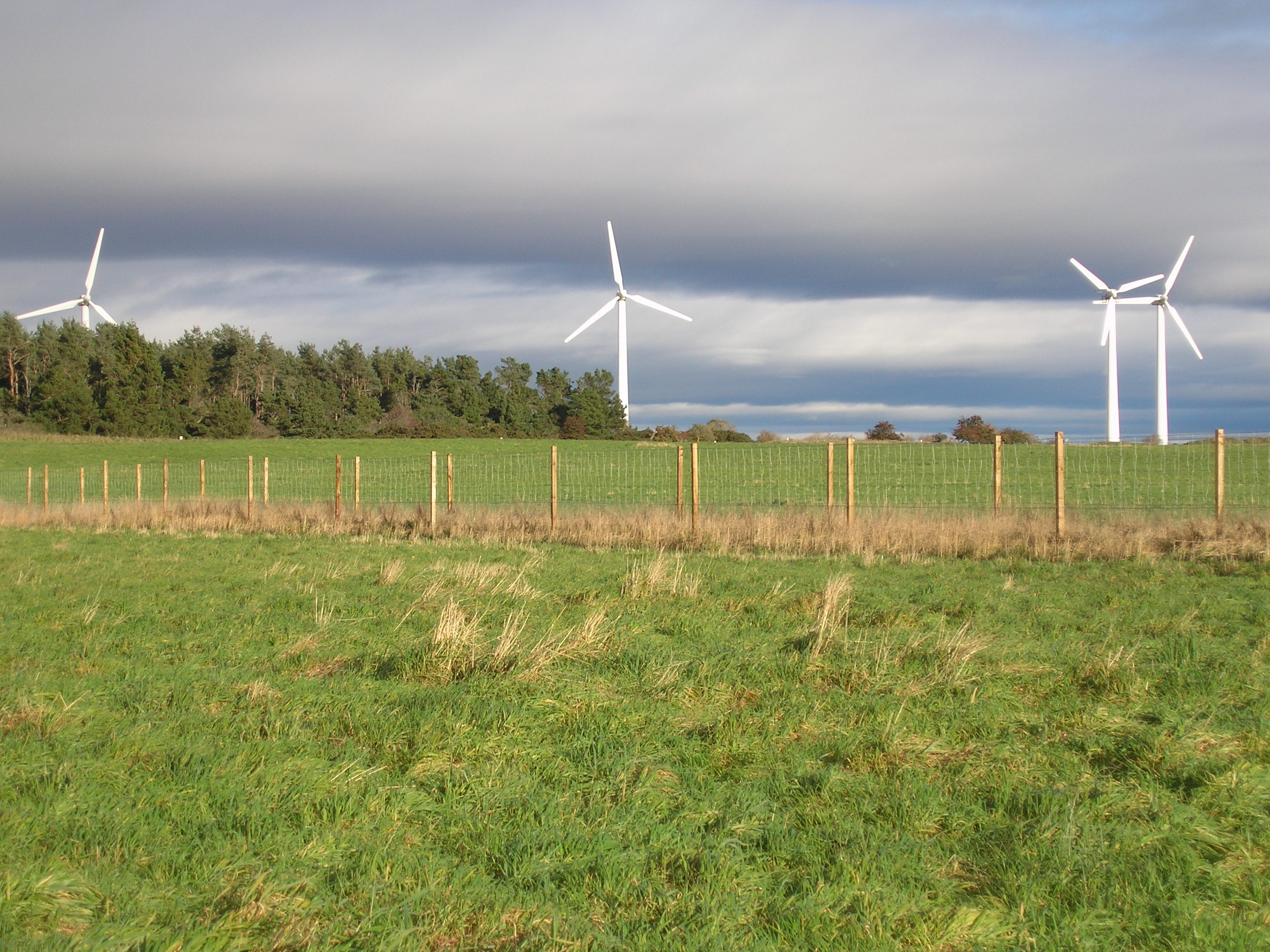
Wind turbines at Findhorn Ecovillage make the community a net exporter of electricity.

Community wind projects are locally owned by farmers, investors, businesses, schools, utilities, or other public or private entities who utilize wind energy to support and reduce energy costs to the local community. The key feature is that local community members have a significant, direct financial stake in the project beyond land lease payments and tax revenue. Projects may be used for on-site power or to generate wholesale power for sale, usually on a commercial-scale greater than 100 kW.

== Community wind farms ==
=== Australia ===
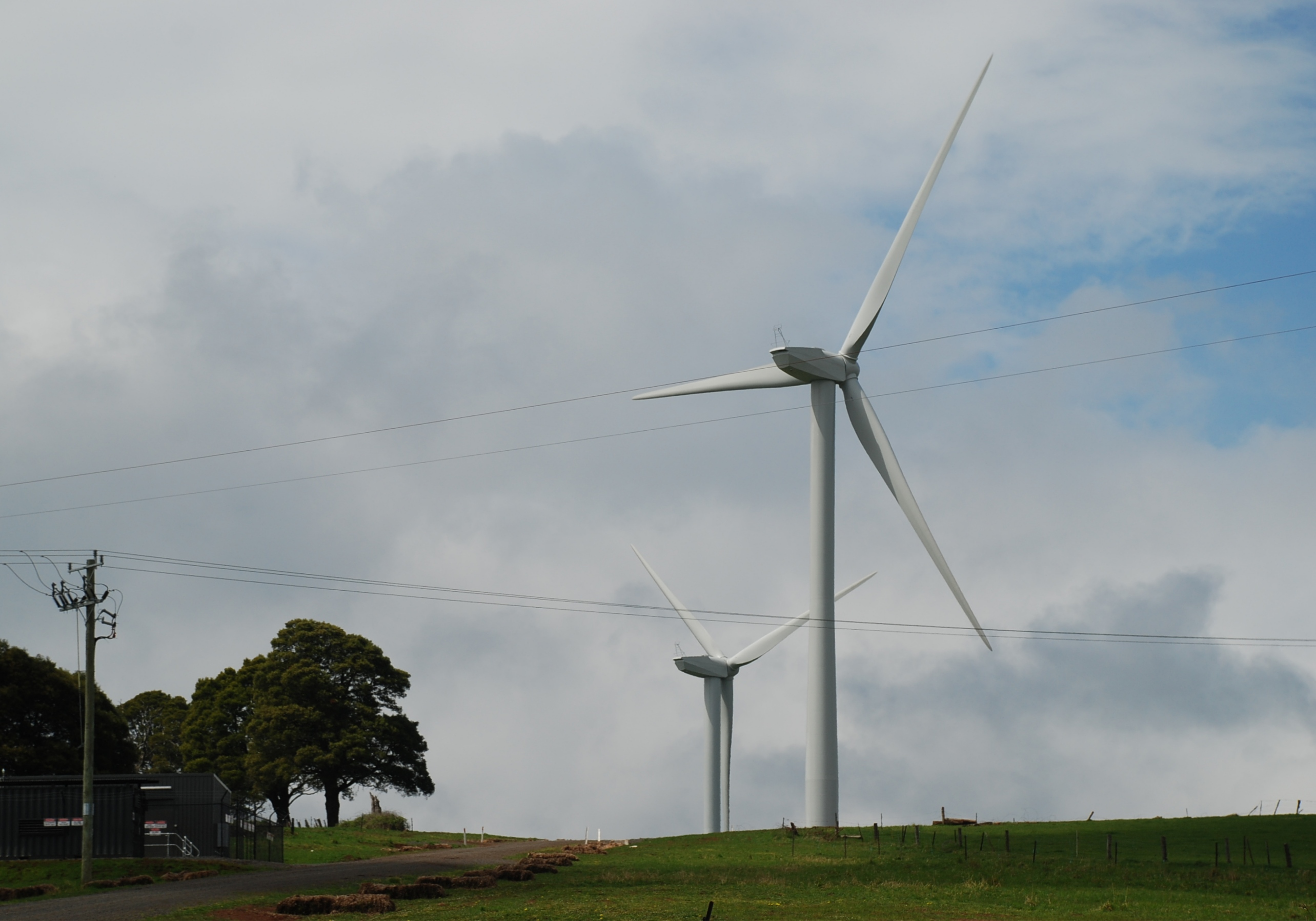
Hepburn Wind Farm

The Hepburn Wind Project is a wind farm at Leonards Hill near Daylesford, Victoria, north-west of Melbourne, Victoria. It comprises two 2MW wind turbines which produce enough power for 2,300 households.

This is the first Australian community-owned wind farm. The initiative has emerged because the community felt that the state and federal governments were not doing enough to address climate change.

Telecommunication towers will be repowered with small wind turbines under a new project led by a Newcastle startup. Ten small wind turbines will be installed at ten remote Australian communication sites as part of a new project to boost the uptake of the technology.

=== Canada ===
Community wind power is in its infancy in Canada but there are reasons for optimism. One such reason is the launch of a new Feed-in Tariff (FIT) program in the Province of Ontario . A number of community wind projects are in development in Ontario but the first project that is likely to obtain a FIT contract and connect to the grid is the Pukwis Community Wind Park. Pukwis will be unique in that it is a joint Aboriginal/Community wind project that will be majority-owned by the Chippewas of Georgina Island First Nation, with a local renewable energy co-operative (the Pukwis Energy Co-operative) owning the remainder of the project.

=== Denmark ===
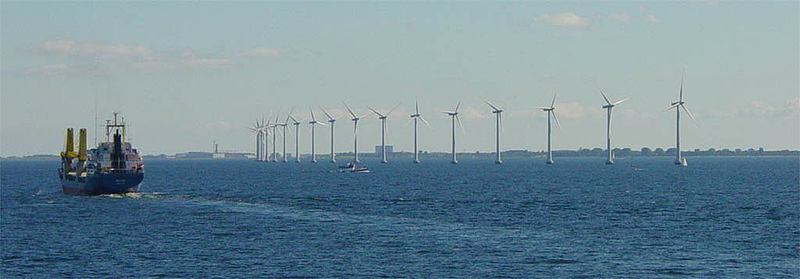
Middelgrunden offshore wind park

In Denmark, families were offered a tax exemption for generating their own electricity within their own or an adjoining commune. By 2001 over 100,000 families belonged to wind turbine cooperatives, which had installed 86% of all the wind turbines in Denmark, a world leader in wind power. Wind power has gained very high social acceptance in Denmark, with the development of community wind farms playing a major role.

In 1997, Samsø won a government competition to become a model renewable energy community. An offshore wind farm comprising 10 turbines (making a total of 21 altogether including land-based windmills), was completed, funded by the islanders. Now 100% of its electricity comes from wind power and 75% of its heat comes from solar power and biomass energy. An Energy Academy has opened in Ballen, with a visitor education center.

=== Germany ===
In Germany, hundreds of thousands of people have invested in citizens' wind farms across the country and thousands of small and medium-sized enterprises are running successful businesses in a new sector that in 2008 employed 90,000 people and generated 8 percent of Germany's electricity. Wind power has gained very high social acceptance in Germany, with the development of community wind farms playing a major role.

In the German district of North Frisia there are more than 60 wind farms with a capacity of about 700 MW, and 90 percent are community-owned. North Frisia is seen to be a model location for community wind, leading the way for other regions, especially in southern Germany.

=== India ===
Starting in 2006, a village panchayat (local self-governing body) in Tamil Nadu state has become completely self-sufficient in energy by using renewable sources like wind, solar and biogas.

The Odanthurai village panchayat near Coimbatore city comprises 11 villages and has a population of about 8,000. By 2009, it had set up its own 350 kW windfarm to meet its energy needs. The windmill was set up at Malwadi near Udumalpet and generates about 8 lakh (800,000) units annually. The power requirement for Odanthurai stands at about 4.5 lakh (450,000) units, and the local panchayat body is now selling the surplus power to the state grid. This gives the panchayat an annual income of 19 lakh rupees.

The village cooperative is also using other sources of renewable energy. It has 65 solar streetlights in two hamlets and a nine-KW (kilowatt) biomass gasifier to pump drinking water from the river to the overhead tanks. Doing so, Odanthurai became the first local body in India to utilize the remunerative enterprises' scheme of the state government.

=== The Netherlands ===
Sixty-three farmers in "De Zuidlob", the southern part of the municipality of Zeewolde, have entered into a cooperative agreement that aims to develop a wind farm of at least 108 MW. The project will include the installation of three phases of 12 wind turbines with capacities of 3 to 4.5 MW each. The aim is to put the wind farm into service in 2012.

The Netherlands has an active community of wind cooperatives. They build and operate wind parks in all regions of the Netherlands. This started in the 1980s with the first Lagerweij turbines. Back then, these turbines could be financed by the members of the cooperatives. Today, the cooperatives build larger wind parks, but not as large as commercial parties do. Some still operate self-sufficiently, others partner with larger commercial wind park developers.

Because of the very unproductive state policies for financing wind parks in the Netherlands, the cooperatives have developed a new financing model, where members of a cooperative do not have to pay taxes for the electricity they generate with their community wind park. In this construction the Zelfleveringsmodel the cooperative operates the wind park, and a traditional energy company only acts as a service provider, for billing and energy balance on the public grid. This is the new role for energy companies in the future, where production is largely decentralized.

In 2012 a new company launched a new business model for community energy, Windcentrale. The wind turbine is sold in physical shares to families. Every share does not give financial gains, but real power, 500 kWh per year, average. A power company, part of the model, subtracts the generated amount of power, from the yearly power bill. Owners only have to pay for the power they used in excess of the amount their share generated. The Windcentrale started with 2 existing turbines that were sold in about 3 months. 8 months later they sold a turbine in a single evening. By the end of 2016 they were a community of about 17.000 members with 10 turbines and about 15 MW rated power. Every turbine is owned by a separate cooperative, with the Windcentrale doing all organizational work in the cooperative. In three years they grew to the same size, in members, than older wind cooperatives with the average age of 25 years. Two of these older wind cooperatives, DeltaWind and Zeeuwind are run as a business and are building a 100 MW wind farm in Krammer.

=== United Kingdom ===
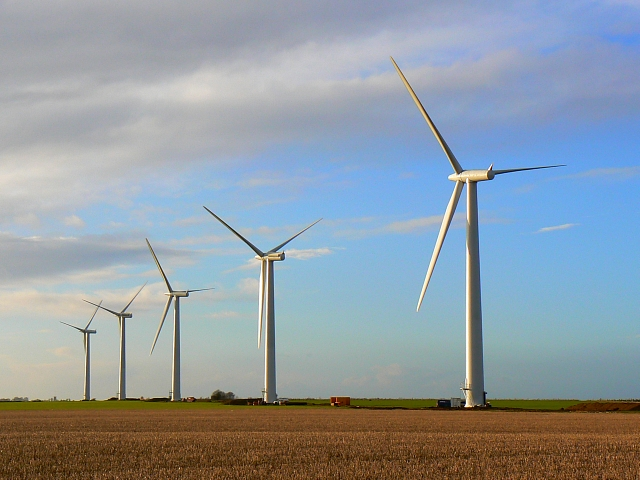
Westmill Wind Farm

As of 2012, there are 43 communities that are in the process of or already producing renewable energy through co-operative structures in the UK. They are set up and run by everyday people, mostly local residents, who are investing their time and money and together installing large wind turbines, solar panels, or hydro-electric power for their local communities.

Baywind Energy Co-operative was the first co-operative to own wind turbines in the United Kingdom. Baywind was modeled on the similar wind turbine cooperatives and other renewable energy co-operatives that are common in Scandinavia, and was founded as an industrial and provident society in 1996. It grew to exceed 1,300 members, each with one vote.

A proportion of the profits is invested in local community environmental initiatives through the Baywind Energy Conservation Trust. As of 2006, Baywind owns a 2.5 megawatt five-turbine wind farm at Harlock Hill near Ulverston, Cumbria (operational since 29 January 1997), and one of the 600 kilowatt turbines at the Haverigg II wind farm near Millom, Cumbria.

Community-owned schemes in Scotland include schemes Harris in the Outer Hebrides and on the Isle of Gigha. The Heritage Trust set up Gigha Renewable Energy to buy and operate three Vestas V27 wind turbines, known locally as The Dancing Ladies or Creideas, Dòchas is Carthannas (Gaelic for Faith, Hope and Charity). They were commissioned on 21 January 2005 and are capable of generating up to 675 kW of power. Revenue is produced by selling the electricity to the grid via an intermediary called Green Energy UK. Gigha residents control the whole project and profits are reinvested in the community. The North Harris Trust has installed several turbines on Harris.

Another community-owned wind farm, Westmill Wind Farm Cooperative, opened in May 2008 in the Oxfordshire village of Watchfield. It consists of five 1.3 megawatt turbines, and is described by its promoters as the UK's largest community-owned wind farm. It was structured as a cooperative, whose shares and loan stock were sold to the local community. Other businesses, such as Midcounties Co-operative, also invested, and the Co-operative Bank provided a loan.

Community Energy Scotland is an independent Scottish charity established in 2008 that provides advice and financial support for renewable energy projects developed by community groups in Scotland. The stated aim of Community Energy Scotland is 'to build confidence, resilience and wealth at community level in Scotland through sustainable energy development'.

Findhorn Ecovillage has four Vestas wind turbines that can generate up to 750 kW. These make the community net exporters of renewable-generated electricity. Most of the generation is used on-site with any surplus exported to the National Grid.

Boyndie Wind Farm Co-operative is part of the Energy4All group, which promotes community ownership. A number of other schemes supported by Highlands and Islands Community Energy Company are in the pipeline.

Community Renewable Energy (CoRE) has worked with Berwick Community Development Trust who agreed on the installation of a 500 kW Enercon turbine near the A1. The Trust now has an income of £60,000 a year (increasing) after the turbine was installed in 2014. CoRE supported Oakenshaw Community Association setting up a 500 kW wind turbine near Durham. The turbine begun operating in 2014 and the Association now receives substantial yearly income.

Unity Wind Ltd is an industrial and provident society that intends to install two 2MW wind turbines at North Walsham in North Norfolk. Its key aim is community wind turbines and run by community investment and for financial benefit to the community.

=== United States ===
In 2009, the National Renewable Energy Laboratory published a report that identified three different types of community wind projects in the United States. The first model describes a project owned by a municipal utility, such as the Hull Wind Project in Massachusetts. The second model is a wind project that is jointly owned by local community members, such as the MinWind Projects near Luverne, Minnesota. The third type is a flip-style ownership. This model allows local investors to partner with a corporation in order to take advantage of Production Tax Credit federal incentives. Flip projects have been built in Minnesota and Texas.

== Business models ==
=== Community shared ownership ===
In a community-based model, the developer/manager of a wind farm shares ownership of the project with area landowners and other community members. While the renewables sector often spearheads shared ownership initiatives, communities can proactively invite participation from renewable energy firms. This mutually beneficial collaboration can prove advantageous for both sides. Property owners whose land was used for the wind farm are generally given a choice between a monthly cash lease and ownership units in the development.

=== Cooperative ===
A wind turbine cooperative, also known as a wind energy cooperative, is a jointly owned and democratically controlled enterprise that follows the cooperative model, investing in wind turbines or wind farms. The cooperative model was developed in Denmark. The model has also spread to Germany, the Netherlands, Australia and United Kingdom, with isolated examples elsewhere. At a European level, REScoop.eu advocates for renewable energy cooperatives to have fair access to the market, linking individual cooperatives and federations under its umbrella, representing around 1,000,000 citizens and 1,500 cooperatives.

=== Municipal ===
Some places have enacted policies to encourage development of municipally owned and operated wind turbines on town land. These projects are publicly owned and tax exempt. An example is the Hull Wind One project in Massachusetts' Boston Harbor in 2001. A 660 kW wind turbine was installed, and is still a great example of small scale commercial wind.

== Impacts of community wind energy ==
=== Economic ===
Once a wind farm project is established in a community, jobs are needed for: manufacturing the materials needed to build the project, transportation of supplies to the project area, and construction of the project as well as building roads leading to the project. After the project is complete, jobs will be needed to maintain and operate the facility. According to a study by the New York State Energy Research and Development Authority, wind energy produces 27% more jobs per kilowatt-hour than coal plants and 66% more jobs than natural gas plants. 3. Landowners will also collect revenues for hosting turbines on their property. Given a typical wind turbine spacing requirements, a 250-acre farm could increase annual farm income by $14,000 per year with little effect on their normal farming and ranching operations. 4. Community wind energy projects increase local property tax revenue because there was very little to be taxed previously due to the sparse population and vast farm land. Once the wind turbines are in service they are taxed, creating much needed revenue for the local community.

=== Social ===
The Midwest and the Great Plains regions in the United States are ideal areas for community wind energy projects; they are also often prone to drought. Fossil fuel plants use large amounts of water for cooling purposes which is detrimental to communities' water supply if there is a drought. Wind turbines do not use any water since there is no considerable amount of heat produced during energy generation. Wind energy adds power to the electric grid which decreases the amount of oil needed to generate a community's electricity. Local land owners, who produce the wind energy, can also control the amount of energy produced, which expands the regional energy mix. Overall community wind energy reduces the local community's dependence on oil but, because of the subsidies involved, can greatly increase their costs for electricity.

Typically, the ideal form of a community wind energy project is created by and for local people. Community wind energy in a social scope can be seen as strong or weak based on how farms prioritize social motivations, what local benefits they produce, and how well they respond to local energy demand. The planning process for onshore community wind farms has low success rates. Difficulties arise from local government authorities' decisions on what counts as a representative community group, limiting community projects to more minor scales. Developing community wind energy faces barriers such as uncoordinated organizational structures, local authority decisions, and intricate planning requirements. Community-led projects demand substantial efforts and expertise, often comparable to commercial developments. Intermediaries like NGOs or private professionals help bridge relationships between local communities and big companies. Collaboration challenges arise because large companies require majority stakes in projects.

Perceived inequity in the distribution of costs and benefits of wind energy projects often show up in survey responses to new projects. Studies report that rural communities often have concerns they will disproportionately share the burden of energy produced for urban areas. Community-owned wind projects often receive substantially more support from local communities than corporate wind projects due to the perceived even distribution of impacts and economic benefits. Involving residents as investors or shareholders in these projects has increased acceptance and public support. The flexibility of applications for community wind projects may play a role in garnering higher levels of support from residents. An example is Kiowa County Memorial Hospital in Greensburg, Kansas, which installed a second wind turbine. It shows the success and satisfaction that can come with community wind initiatives.

Community wind energy involves diverse activities such as electricity generation, heat generation, energy efficiency, collective purchasing, storage, transport, education, and awareness. There is a debated focus on understanding factors encouraging community participation. A sense of belonging to a place-based community is often noted as necessary for voluntary engagement in community renewable energy projects. Participation experiences and outcomes are not universally positive, and there are accessibility concerns that community wind energy may favor affluent communities.

Community wind projects can offer benefits in stabilizing energy prices for local communities. Due to the absence of fuel costs and relatively low operating expenses, the owners of these projects can accurately predict their energy costs over the project's lifetime. The projects can generate energy utilized locally or sold to local utilities through fixed-rate power purchase agreements, ensuring long-term stability in energy prices. This can be advantageous in regions where high electricity costs result from fuel imports, as community wind projects can help stabilize or even reduce energy expenses. Community wind projects find applications in many sectors, such as schools, hospitals, businesses, farms, ranches, and community facilities, providing a local source of electricity. Ownership of community wind projects can extend to rural electric cooperatives, municipal utilities, or groups of local individuals forming limited liability corporations. This ownership model allows local communities to participate actively and benefit from wind power initiatives.

=== Environmental ===
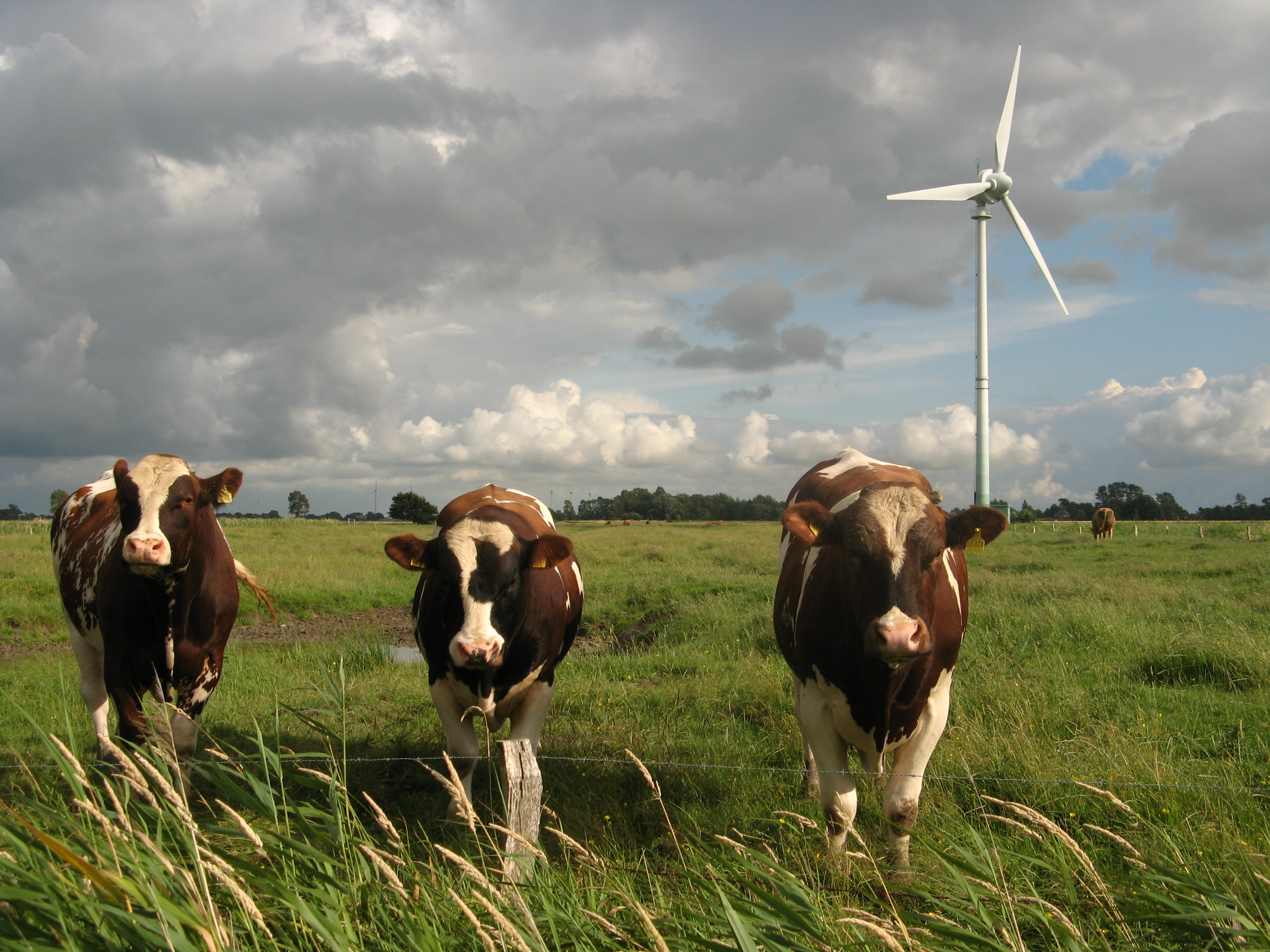
Livestock ignore wind turbines, and continue to graze as they did before wind turbines were installed.

Compared to the environmental impact of traditional energy sources, the environmental impact of wind power is relatively minor. Wind power consumes no fuel, and emits no air pollution, unlike fossil fuel power sources. The energy consumed to manufacture and transport the materials used to build a wind power plant is equal to the new energy produced by the plant within a few months. While a wind farm may cover a large area of land, many land uses such as agriculture are compatible, with only small areas of turbine foundations and infrastructure made unavailable for use.

There are reports of bird and bat mortality at wind turbines as there are around other artificial structures. The scale of the ecological impact may or may not be significant, depending on specific circumstances. Prevention and mitigation of wildlife fatalities, and protection of peat bogs, affect the siting and operation of wind turbines.

There are anecdotal reports of negative effects from noise on people who live very close to wind turbines. Peer-reviewed research has generally not supported these statements.

== Policy, issues, and legislation ==
In 1992, the renewable energy production tax credit of 2.1 cents per kilowatt-hour was established. In February 2009, through the American Recovery and Reinvestment Act, Congress acted to provide a three-year extension of the PTC through December 31, 2012. Wind projects that were up and running in 2009 and 2010 can choose to receive a 30% investment tax credit instead of the PTC. The investment tax credit is also an option for wind projects that are in service before 2013 if the final construction is complete before the end of 2010. Smaller wind farms (100 kW or less) can receive a credit for 30% towards the cost of installment of the system. The ITC, written into law through the Emergency Economic Stabilization Act of 2008, is available for equipment installed from October 3, 2008 through December 31, 2016. The value of the credit is now uncapped, through the American Recovery and Reinvestment Act of 2009.

In order to ensure wind energy's future in the energy market, the renewable electricity standard (RES) is a policy in which market mechanisms guarantee a growing percentage of electricity produced comes from renewable sources, like wind energy. The RES exists in 28 states (not at a national level). An example is the Obama-Biden New Energy for America plan, which sets future goals of rapid renewable energy production at 10% by 2012.

A pressing issue of concern is the lack of a modern interstate transmission grid which delivers carbon free electricity to customers. Currently the US Senate and the Natural Resources Committee have reported the bill out of committee on June 17, 2009. A combined energy and climate bill is expected to be considered by the full Senate this fall. In the US House of Representatives the House Energy and Commerce Committee approved a comprehensive energy and climate bill on May 21, 2010.

The clean air and climate change policy is goal to switch from fossil fuel energy sources to renewable carbon-free energy sources for electricity production. Generating 20% of U.S. electricity from wind would be the climate equivalent of removing 140 million vehicles from the roadways. Currently the US Senate Committee on Environmental and Public Works has control over the legislation and will begin to complete a markup by September 25, 2009. The House of Representatives passed the American Clean Energy and Security Act on June 26, 2009, comprising a provision to reduce carbon dioxide emissions 17% below 2005 levels by 2020 and 83% below 2005 levels by 2050. It also allocates a portion of the allowances given away for free to energy efficiency and renewable energy. However, the allowances flow through state governments rather than directly to renewable generators.

Overall federal funding for community wind research and development is insufficient and even more so when compared to other fuels and energy sources. In 2009 the US Department of Energy (DOE) received $118 million from the American Recovery and Reinvestment Act for wind energy research and development. In 2010 the Senate passed a bill granting the DOE $85 million for the DOE wind program. For the same purpose, the House of Representatives allowed the DOE $70 million.

== See also ==
- List of onshore wind farms
- Native Wind
- Community solar farm
