= Native Wind =

American organization

Native Wind was formed to protect the environment and promote the welfare of Native Americans by facilitating the development of wind power and other renewable energy resources on tribal lands. Directors of Native Wind include representatives of the Intertribal Council On Utility Policy, Native Energy, ICLEI, Honor the Earth and American Spirit Productions.

Two wind facilities have previously been built through Native Wind -- a 750kW turbine at the Rosebud Indian Reservation and another at the Fort Berthold Indian Reservation in North Dakota.

The Indian tribes of the North and South Dakota and Nebraska are presently collaborating on a project to develop the large wind resources of the northern Great Plains. Eight separate tribes are moving ahead with plans to develop the first large-scale Native owned and operated wind farms in the United States.

== See also ==
- Community wind energy
- Wind Powering America Initiative
