= Hepburn Wind Project =

Community owned wind farm in Victoria, Australia

Coordinates: 37°25′19.4″S 144°07′09.4″E

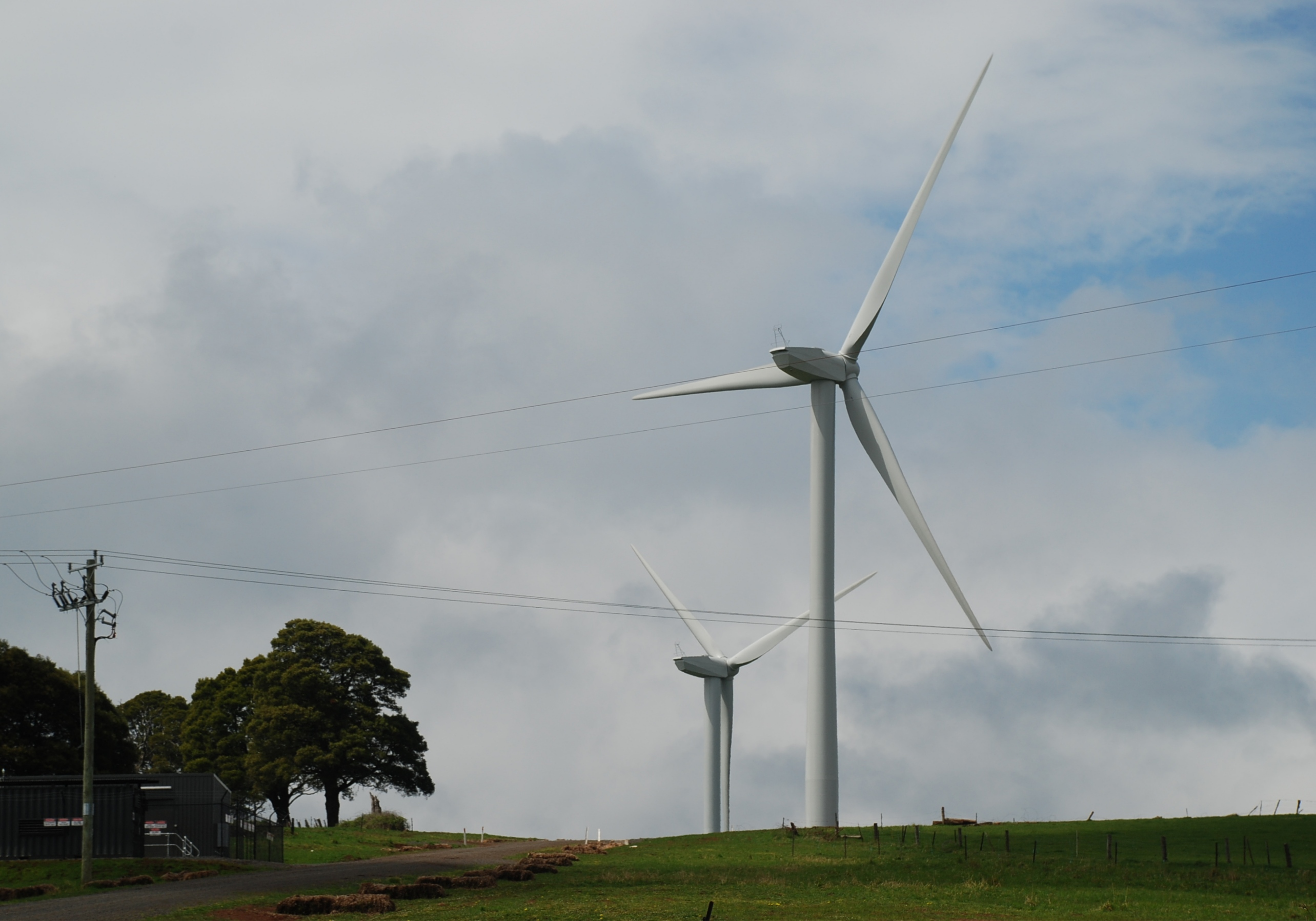
Hepburn Wind Farm

The Hepburn Wind Project is a wind farm built and owned by Hepburn Wind, a community co-operative, and supported by the Victorian Government. The location of the project is Leonards Hill, 10 kilometres (6.2 mi) south of Daylesford, Victoria, north-west of Melbourne, Victoria. It comprises two individual 2.05 MW wind turbines supplied by REpower System AG which are projected to produce enough energy for 2,300 households when the wind is blowing, almost as many houses are in the twin-towns of Daylesford and Hepburn Springs.

The project is the first community-owned wind farm in Australia. The initiative emerged because the community felt that the state and federal governments were not doing enough to address climate change. Hepburn Wind is the first project of the Hepburn Renewable Energy Association, now known as SHARE.

Hepburn Wind Project formally launched their share offer on 25 July 2008, and as of June 2011 over 1700 members had subscribed a total of $9.0 million. The project has secured over $13.1 million in funding with the additional funds being bank debt and Government grants. Shares have been issued with priority to the local residents of Daylesford and Hepburn Springs.

As the project is under 30 MW, it was assessed under the local planning guidelines administered through the Hepburn Shire Council. The planning permit was issued by Hepburn Shire in February 2007. The council received 325 submissions in support of the proposal and 18 objections. The permit was subsequently challenged unsuccessfully at the Victorian Civil and Administrative Tribunal (VCAT) in June 2007.

On 28 April 2010 the project signed a contract with REpower Systems for the turnkey construction of the wind farm. The official ground breaking ceremony was held on 8 October 2010 and was officiated by the Hon Gavin Jennings, the Victorian Minister for the Environment at the time.

Construction began in November 2010. The turbines left Germany on 5 December 2010 on the SE Panthea and arrived in Melbourne on 22 February 2011.

A community picnic day was held to view and celebrate the erection of the first turbine on Saturday, 19 April 2011.

The wind farm began generating power into the local electricity network on Wednesday, 22 June 2011.

Community-owned wind farms are common in Denmark and Germany, which have high levels of wind power use. Community wind projects are also emerging in Canada, the Netherlands, the United Kingdom and the United States. The director of the Hepburn Wind Project, Taryn Lane, recently was awarded "Outstanding Woman of Victoria: Trailblazer".

== See also ==
- Community Wind
- List of energy cooperatives
- Wind power in Victoria, Australia
