= Dakota Coal Company =

Coal company in North Dakota

The Dakota Coal Company, subsidiary of Basin Electric Power Cooperative, is based in Bismarck, North Dakota. It controls the rights to lignite reserves in North Dakota and provides financing for the Freedom Mine north of Beulah, ND. Dakota Coal Company is also responsible for marketing Freedom Mine lignite production. Dakota Coal and The Coteau Properties Co. work closely with their customers to ensure lignite quality doesn't hamper daily plant operations.

== Mining History Leading to Dakota Coal Co. ==
Settlement mainly started when Easterners launched the transcontinental Northern Pacific Railway in 1871. While military and experimental expeditions traveled throughout the northern part of the Dakota Territory, they discovered oil near the top of the land. The mineral source of coal was such an important discovery in the Dakota region because they lacked any forests to provide fuel from lumber needed for survival. The more pioneers that arrived the faster coal was used for energy, and quickly became North Dakota's first major industry.

== Customers ==
- Antelope Valley Station
- Leland Olds Station
- The Dakota Gasification Company

Customers for Dakota Coal Company include Basin Electric's Antelope Valley Station, the Leland Olds Station, and Dakota Gasification Company's Great Plains Synfuels Plant. Dakota Coal also has a division, Wyoming Lime Producers, and a subsidiary, Montana Limestone Company.

== Projects ==
North Dakota Coal has two separate projects which are headed by two separate companies (North American Coal Corp & South Heart Coal LLC) which are both under fire from environmental groups. Each of these companies have been using the state's money (totaling in 8 million dollars) to advance each of their respective projects, and the deadline to their state contracts are both ending at the conclusion of this year. "They are dead in the water," said Wayde Schafer of the Sierra Club. "No progress has been made on either of them and nothing to show for the money they've spent." A spokesman for North American Coal Corp stated that "We still believe the project is an important part of the nation's energy solution," spokesman David Straley said. South Heart Coal LLC has yet to make a statement about their case.

== Legislative and Legal Contributors ==
The United States of America vs. Basin Electric Power Cooperative: After being investigated for two years, in 1997, the United States took action. Filed in the U.S. District Court in Bismarck, the complaint accused the Basin Cooperative of overcharging the United States government millions of dollars. Allegedly the Department of Western Area Power Administration falsely overpaid $23.8 million. Basin also fraudulently used a 10-year amortization period plan for interest when they normally used a 20-year plan. This directly caused a disparate fee. Dakota Coal Company (subsidiary of Basin) was used to falsely charge financially gained margins not prohibited under contract. The government is allotted from $5,000-$10,000 per violation under the False Claims Act.

North Dakota vs. Minnesota: In 2007, Minnesota signed the Next Generation Energy Act, which not only barred Minnesota from building more coal power plants but from entering into contract or purchasing coal-made electricity sources. While the Act was intended to reduce Minnesota's carbon-dioxide emissions it was in violation of the Constitution's interstate commerce clause. It limited North Dakota companies (including the Dakota Coal Company) the ability to sell; which is a regulation only Congress has authority over. North Dakota filed the lawsuit November 2011 and was unanimously favored by the federal judge but later appealed by Minnesota. For a final standing in June 2016 a panel of judges of the 8th U.S. Circuit Appeals ruled against Minnesota.

North Dakota vs. the U.S. Department of Interior: North Dakota filed against the U.S. Department of Interior Office of Surface Mining Reclamation and Enforcement (OSM) in 2016 due to the new Stream Protection Rule, which violates federal law and the United States Constitution. It oversteps on North Dakota's regulation services of surface mining and reclamation within the state. North Dakota Public Service Commissioner Randy Christmann commented, “In the most recent evaluation of our program, the OSM said that North Dakota has an effective program with no issues in need of corrective action. But with this rule, the Obama administration would infringe on our authority and effectively stop much of the coal mining in North Dakota.”

== Coal Land Reclamation ==
Clean Air Act: Passed in 1963, to offer federal aid, involvement in interstate pollution topics, and create state agencies but later amendments proved more important.

- The 1965 Amendment: demanded the U.S. Health, Education, and Services to develop and apply clean air standards.
- The 1970 Amendment: gave power to the federal government to regulate pollution in four key ways:
1. National Ambient Air Quality Standards created to protect the environment and human wellbeing
2. New Source Performance Standards; researching where and how much pollution is deemed legal.
3. Auto emissions standards and gas reduction by 90%
4. Encouraged states to accomplish standards and that all plans should be EPA approved.

Clean Power Plan: Introduced in 2015 under the Obama administration, this plan was formed to majorly reduce the carbon-dioxide emissions to fight against the waging war on climate change. To reach the plans goal in 2030, power plants emissions will be reduced nationwide by a whopping 32%. Provided by the EPA North Dakota, specifically, will have to reduce its carbon emissions by 44.9%.

== Divisions and Subsidiaries ==
- Wyoming Lime Producers
- Montana Limestone Company
- Westmoreland Coal Company
  - Beluah Mine
- The Coteau Properties Company
  - The Freedom Mine
- BNI Coal
  - The Center Mine
