= Westmill Woodland Burial Ground =

Natural cemetery in Oxfordshire, England

Coordinates: 51.6165°N 1.6605°W

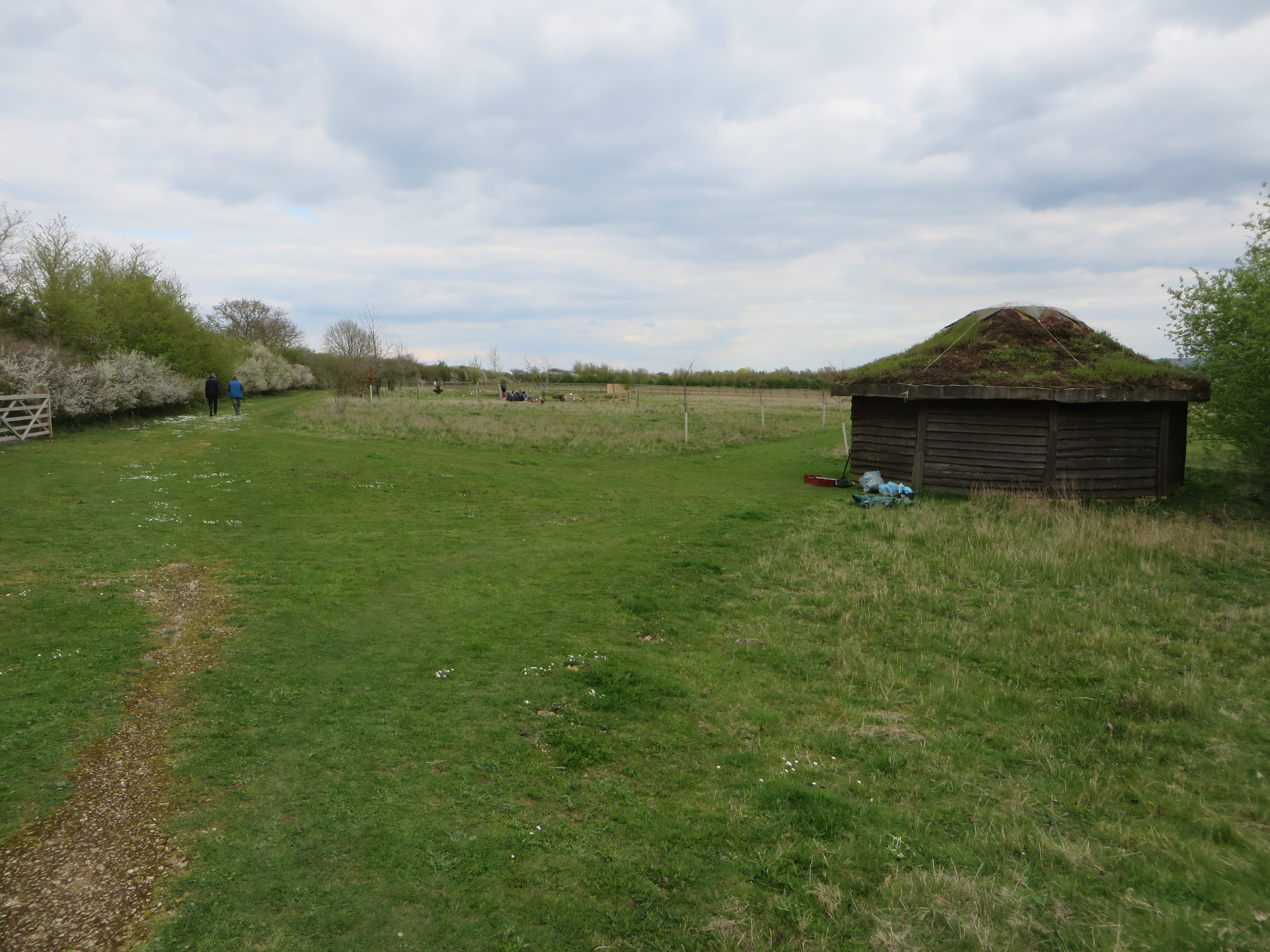
The burial ground in 2016

Westmill Woodland Burial Ground is a green burial ground in the Vale of White Horse on the border of Oxfordshire with Wiltshire in southern England. In the distance, the Uffington White Horse, an Iron Age horse carved into the white chalk on the Berkshire Downs, can be seen to the south-east.

The burial ground is in Watchfield parish, north-west of Watchfield village and north of Shrivenham. Close to the site are Westmill Wind Farm and Westmill Solar Park, two renewable energy resources.

The business was founded and is managed by Liz Rothchild, who is also Director of Kicking the Bucket, a festival about living and dying. The community interest company Westmill Woodland Burial Ground C.I.C. runs the ground.

The site is intended for natural burials and is in a rural setting. It won the 2015 Cemetery of the Year award in the 2015 Good Funeral Awards.

== Gallery ==
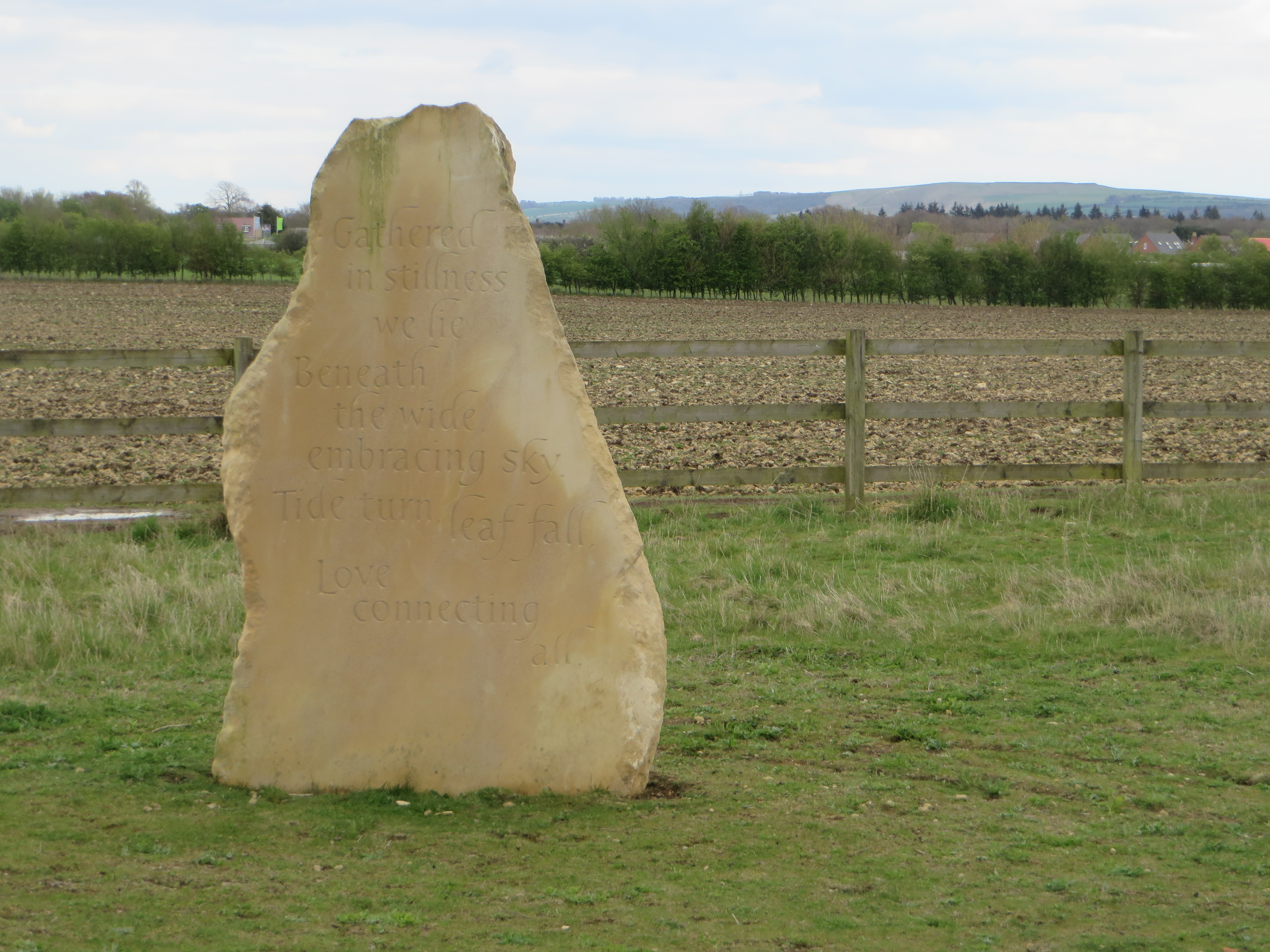
Memorial stone at the Westmill Woodland Burial Ground, with the Uffington White Horse in the distant background on the hillside

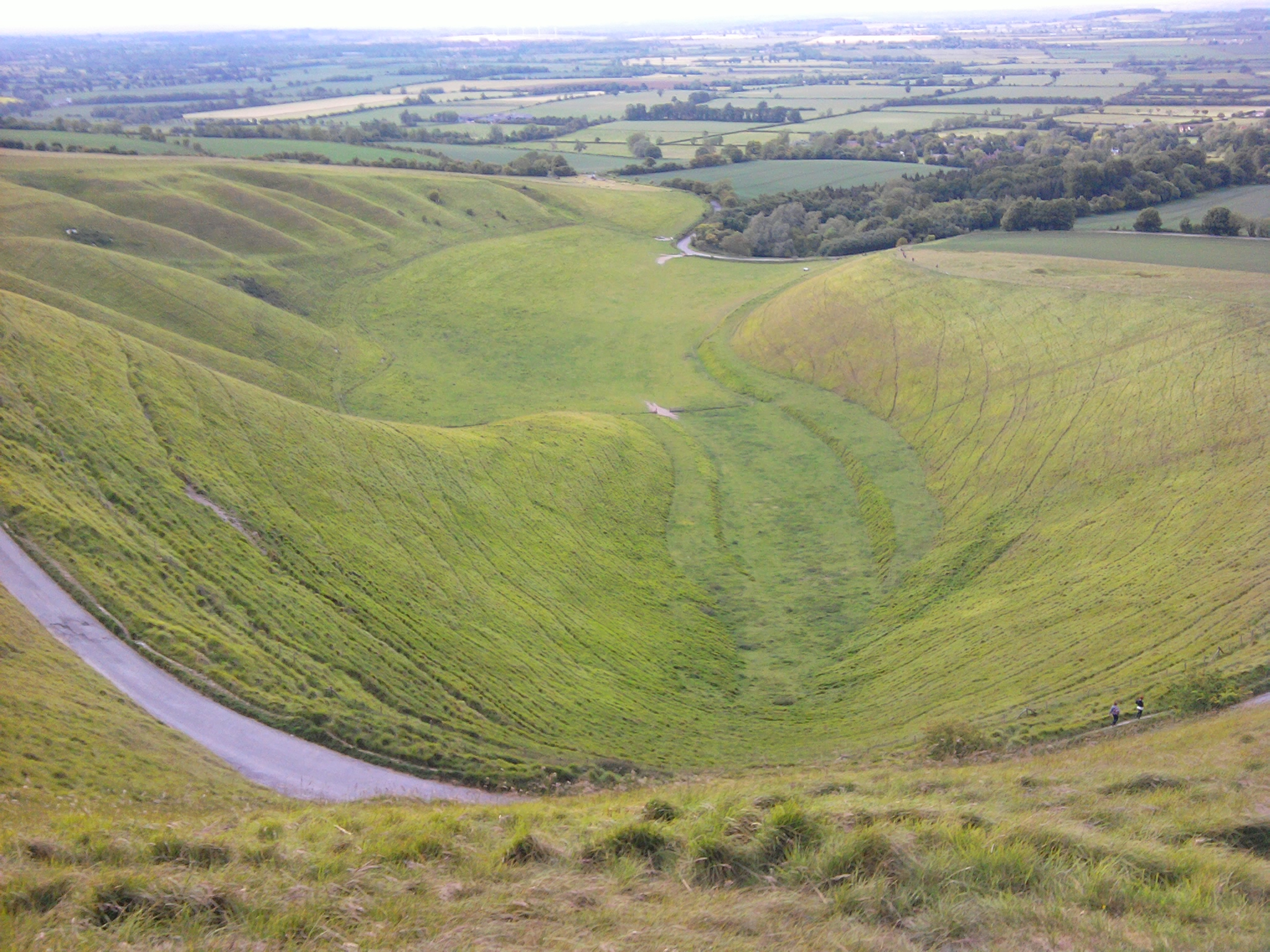
View from the White Horse, looking towards the burial ground by the wind turbines of Westmill Wind Farm in the distance

== See also ==
- List of cemeteries in England
