= Taryn Lane =

Australian renewable energy expert

- Awards: Victorian Honour Roll, Churchill Fellowship
- Scientific career
- Fields: Renewables and community energy
- Workplaces: Hepburn Community Wind Farm

Taryn Lane is the manager of Hepburn Community Wind Farm, and in 2021 she was inducted into the Victorian Honour Roll of Women in the 'Trailblazer' category. She is a community energy and renewable energy expert.

== Early life and career ==
Lane obtained a Bachelor and Master of Arts. She lives in Central Victoria, and is the manager of the community owned Hepburn Community Wind Farm, which aims to be a source of 100% sustainable energy for the community. Lane is a director of RE-Alliance, the Coalition for Community Energy, and the director of the Smart Energy Council. Lane works at Hepburn Community wind farm, which is the 'Australia’s first community owned wind generator'. In 2011, 2,000 community members donated $10 million to fund the building of a wind farm with two turbines. The objective is to be using 100% renewable energy by 2024. Lane is also a fellow at the Centre for Sustainability Leadership.

Hepburn Community Wind Farm, of which Lane is a manager, won a Premier's sustainability award for community. The Hepburn Wind Farm also received a sustainability award finalist. She commented on how communities can reduce emissions, aiming for net zero, using renewables: "Governments are adhering to the net zero 2050 target but we think it is important to reach no more than 1.5 degrees in the next decade," Lane said. "If we can do as much as we can at a grassroots level, governments can be more ambitious."

== Select publications ==
1. Hicks J., Lane T., Wood E. and Hall (2018). The Enhancing Positive Social Outcomes from Wind Farm Development report.
2. Hall, Hicks J, Lane T. & Wood E. (2020). Planning to engage the community on renewables: insights from community engagement plans of the Australian wind industry, Australasian Journal of Environmental Management, 27:2, 123–136.
3. Lane, T. and J. Hicks (2017) Community Engagement and Benefit Sharing in Renewable Energy Development: A Guide for Applicants to the Victorian Renewable Energy Target Auction. Department of Environment, Land, Water and Planning, Victorian Government, Melbourne.
4. Lane, T & Hicks, J & Memery, C & Thompson, B. et al. (2015). Guide to community-owned renewable energy for Victorians. Dept. of Economic Development, Jobs, Transport and Resources, Melbourne.
5. Lane T. and Hicks J. (2014) Best Practice Community Engagement in Wind Developments.

== Prizes and awards ==
Lane has been awarded prizes, as an individual, and also for the Hepburn Community Wind Farm, of which she is a director. The Hepburn Community Wind Farm has been awarded National and Global prizes. Lane was inducted into the Victorian Honour Roll of Women in 2021, and was a Churchill Fellow in 2016.

Prizes and awards
Year	Award
2021	Victorian Honour Roll of Women inductees
2019	Joint Winner Risk management
2016	Churchill Fellow, Victoria
