= Westmill Solar Co-operative =

Photovoltaic power station in England

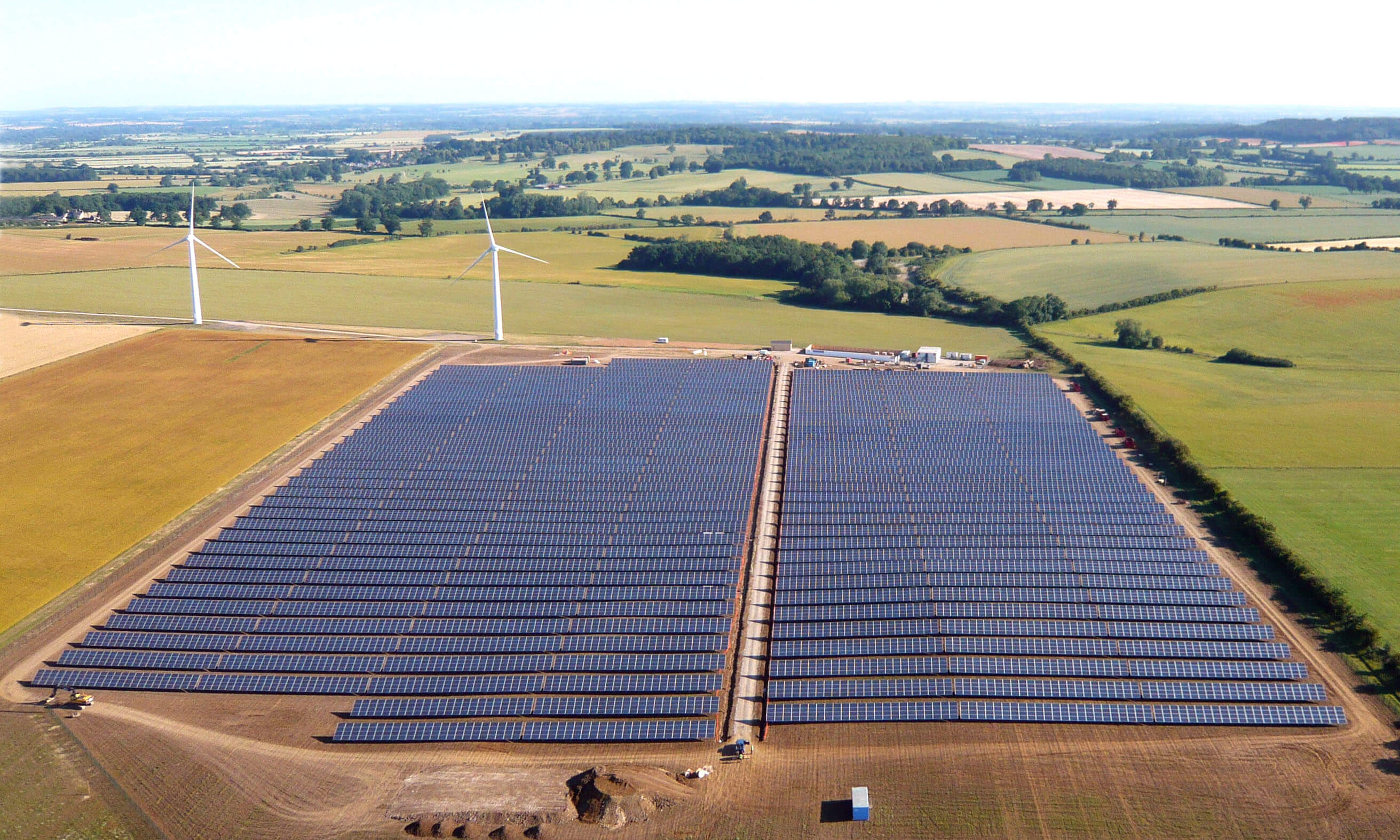
Westmill Solar Park with part of Westmill Wind Farm in the background.

Westmill Solar Co-operative is the industrial and provident society that owns the Westmill Solar Park in Oxfordshire, England.

== Project ==
The project was originally conceived by Adam Twine, the pioneer behind the neighbouring Westmill Wind Farm Co-operative, built in 2011 and registered for the UK feed-in tariffs. It has a capacity of 5 MW_{P}.

Westmill Solar Co-operative acquired the solar park in October 2012, under an option agreement with the original developers. It raised the necessary finance through public and private share offers and a senior debt bond with a pension fund.

== Westmill Solar Park ==
Westmill solar park is in the United Kingdom located on a site of 30 acres near to Watchfield, on the Wiltshire/Oxfordshire border, just off the A420. The site adjoins that of the Westmill Wind Farm Co-operative.

The solar power plant has over 21,000 solar panels and has been operational since July 2011.

When acquired by the Co-operative, it was the largest community-owned photovoltaic power station in the world.

== Co-operative membership and equity ==
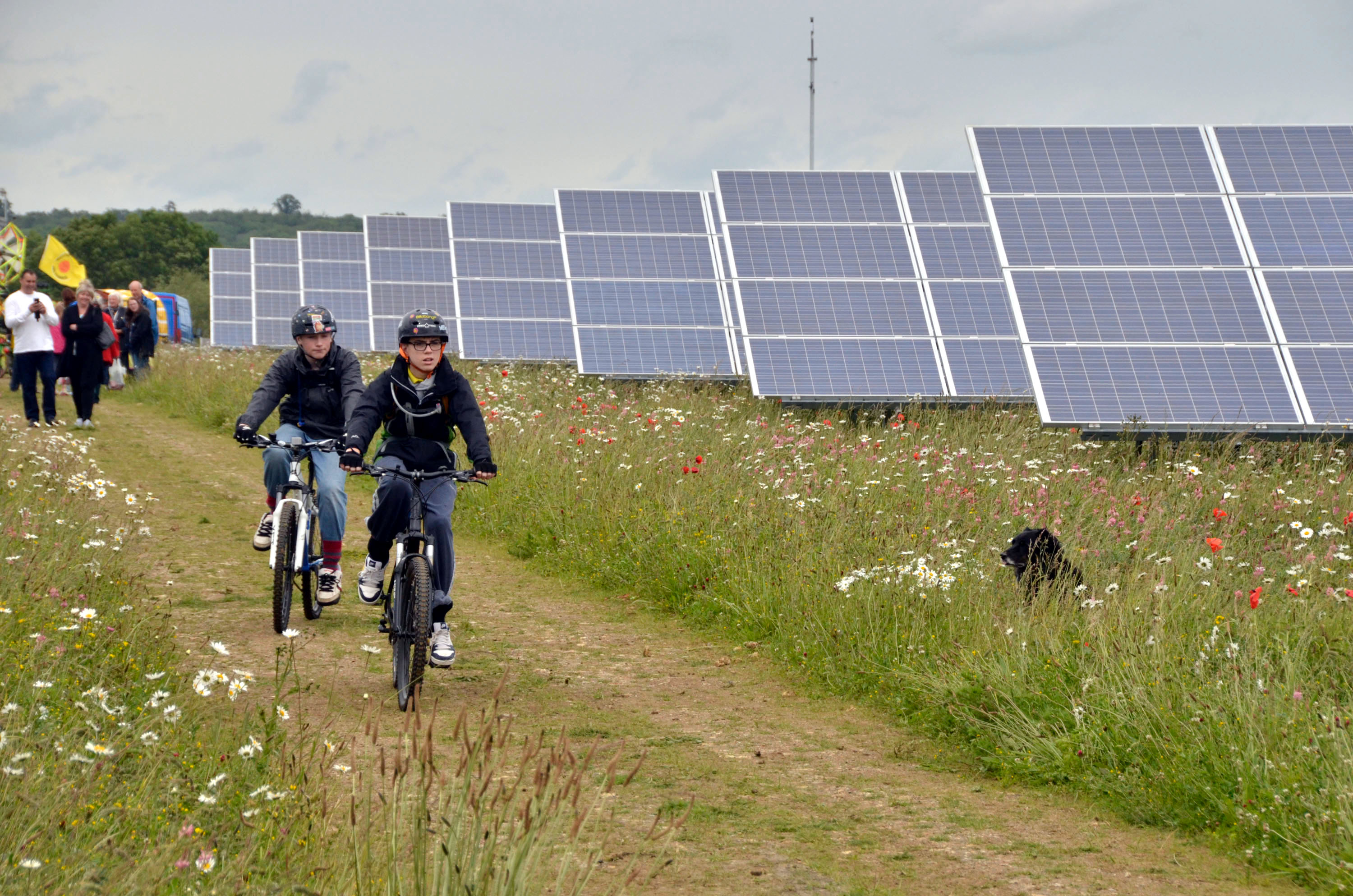
Visitors at a Westmill Solar Co-operative Open Day at Westmill Solar Park.

The Co-operative invited members through a public share offer, launched in June 2012. Despite the tight timetable caused by the expiry date on the option, the issue was 50% over-subscribed, when it closed at the end of July. This raised £4m from c. 1,650 members.

An additional c. £2m was raised by a private placement of B-Shares, mainly from members who had subscribed to the original issue.

== Other financing ==
The Co-operative raised the balance of funding required in the form of a 23½-year senior debt bond. This was arranged with the Lancashire County Council Pension Fund, in what was believed to be the first major funding by a local authority in community-owned energy infrastructure.

== See also ==
- Community solar
- Westmill Wind Farm Co-operative
- Westmill Woodland Burial Ground
- List of energy cooperatives
