= RAF Watchfield =

Former RAF station in Oxfordshire, England

RAF Watchfield Arnhem Camp
- Watchfield, Oxfordshire in England

Site information
- Type: Royal Air Force station
- Owner: Ministry of Defence
- Operator: Royal Air Force; British Army
- Controlled by: RAF Flying Training Command

Location
- Shown within Oxfordshire RAF Watchfield (the United Kingdom)
- Coordinates: 51°37′14″N 001°38′52″W

Site history
- Built: 1940
- In use: 1940 - 1972
- Battles/wars: European theatre of World War II

Royal Air Force Watchfield or more simply RAF Watchfield is a former Royal Air Force station, opened in England in 1940 just north of Watchfield village (at that time in Berkshire, now in Oxfordshire). Its nearest towns were Highworth, Wiltshire, 3 miles (5 km) to the west, and Faringdon, Oxfordshire, 3.5 miles (6 km) to the north-east.

The airfield had grass runways and was operated by the RAF until 1950, after which it was used by the Army for parachute training and development of vehicle air drop, with planes flying from RAF Abingdon and using the former airfield as a drop zone. In 1961, 16 Parachute Heavy Drop company (RAOC) was formed there. This company moved to RAF Hullavington in February 1971 and the site was closed in 1972.

== Based units ==
The airfield was used by a number of units, including No. 4 Air Observers Navigation School RAF (which came from RAF Ansty) between 20 July 1940 and 30 August 1941 flying the de Havilland Tiger Moth. No. 11 Air Observers Navigation School RAF also joined on 20 July 1940 but left on 19 July 1941.

Maintenance units such as No. 5 Maintenance Unit RAF used the airfield on a temporary basis. It was a sub-site of No. 7 Maintenance Unit RAF between September and November 1940. No. 50 Group Pool RAF were also present during 1940.

No. 3 Elementary Flying Training School RAF from RAF Hamble were present for a short time, arriving 20 July 1940.

=== Beam approach ===
RAF Watchfield was used as one of the first airfields which taught Blind/Beam Approach which meant that when no other aircraft were flying in the country due to the weather, aircraft from Watchfield flew constantly, teaching pilots how to land in dangerous conditions. The first unit to use the station for this purpose was the Blind Approach School RAF between 28 September 1940 and 1941, which became No. 1 Blind Approach School RAF between 1941 and 31 October 1941, and in turn No. 1 Beam Approach School RAF which operated between 31 October 1941 and 31 December 1946.

Smaller beam approach units also used the airfield, such as Blind Approach Calibration Flight RAF between 12 July and October 1941, becoming Beam Approach Calibration Flight RAF which operated between October 1941 and 3 July 1942. No. 1 Beam Approach School RAF helped to create a Beam Approach Technical Training School RAF which operated between October 1942 and 4 December 1943, and the Beam Approach Development Unit RAF which operated between 4 October 1942 and 12 April 1943.

=== Other units ===
- Airfield Controller's School RAF between 15 November 1942 and 1 May 1948 which was absorbed into the School of Air Traffic Control.
- No. 92 (Forward) Staging Post RAF between 25 May and 13 July 1944.
- 'Sparrow' Ambulance Flight RAF using the Sparrow variant of the Handley Page Harrow between 2 June and 2 August 1944, from No. 271 Squadron RAF.
- A detachment of Avro Ansons as part of No. 46 Group RAF, RAF Transport Command between May 1944 and 18 July 1944.

=== Air traffic control ===
The School of Air Traffic Control used Watchfield between 1 November 1946 and 10 February 1950 before moving to RAF Shawbury.

== Army use ==
After closure by the RAF in 1950, the site was renamed Arnhem Camp. It was used for parachute training with jumps from tethered balloons, and for the development of the 'medium stressed platform' (MSP) which was the basis for air-dropping a military Land Rover and trailer, and later other military vehicles. The site was also used for packing items for air despatch and air drop, which were then transported by truck to RAF airfields such as RAF Abingdon.

Units at Watchfield in the 1950s included 47 Company RASC and an air despatch training unit. In 1960, 1 Army Air Support Organisation (1 AASO) was formed with HQ at Watchfield, and 47 Company and 22 Company joined it. Also at Arnhem Camp in the 1950s was 2nd Air Maintenance Company RAOC which became the 2nd Airborne Company RAOC. On 16 December 1961 16 Parachute Heavy Drop Company of the RAOC was formed, and Watchfield remained their base until 1971.

== Watchfield Free Festival ==
Between 23 and 31 August 1975 the former airfield was the site of the "People's Free Festival" (also named "Watchfield Free Festival"), a free rock festival as a successor of the Windsor Free Festivals from the preceding years which ended in riots in 1974. The authorities offered the organisers the former airfield as a new venue. Top act in 1975 was Hawkwind.

== Current use ==
The site is currently used for a wind farm called Westmill Wind Farm which is owned by Westmill Wind Farm Co-operative.
