= Basin Electric Power Cooperative =

North Dakota-based electricity generation and transmission cooperative

- Company type: Non-profit organization
- Industry: Utilities
- Founded: 1960; 66 years ago
- Headquarters: Bismarck, North Dakota, United States
- Area served: North Dakota
- Subsidiaries: Dakota Gasification Company; Dakota Coal Company
- Website: www.basinelectric.com

Basin Electric Power Cooperative is a wholesale electric generation and transmission cooperative based in North Dakota that provides electricity to 3 million customers in nine U.S. states. The roots of the cooperative go back to 1960 when Leland Olds and ten power suppliers created Giant Power Cooperative. Giant Power was first going to be a generation and transmission cooperative, but to keep electricity cheaper for rural customers, Basin Electric Power Cooperative was started in 1961. Today, Basin Electric's power sources include coal, natural gas, hydroelectric, wind, waste heat, and nuclear.

The current CEO and General Manager is Todd Telesz. A subsidiary of Basin Electric, Dakota Gasification Company, operates the Great Plains Synfuels Plant, which captures and sequesters nearly 50% of its carbon dioxide emissions in a system developed during the Carter administration. In 2005, the membership of Basin Electric passed a resolution requiring 10 percent of electricity demand to be provided by renewable forms of energy. At the end of 2009, Basin Electric finished construction on a 77 turbine wind energy project.

== Member cooperatives ==
=== Direct purchasing ===
- Grand Electric Cooperative - Bison, South Dakota
- KEM Electric Cooperative - Linton, North Dakota
- Minnesota Valley Cooperative Light & Power Association - Montevideo, Minnesota
- Minnesota Valley Electric Cooperative - Jordan, Minnesota
- Mor-Gran-Sou Electric Cooperative - Flasher, North Dakota
- Powder River Energy Corporation - Sundance, Wyoming
- Roughrider Electric Cooperative - Hazen, North Dakota
- Rosebud Electric Cooperative - Gregory, South Dakota
- Wright-Hennepin Cooperative Electric Association - Rockford, Minnesota

=== G&T ===
- Central Power Electric Cooperative - Minot, North Dakota
- Central Montana Electric Power Cooperative - Great Falls, Montana
- Corn Belt Power Cooperative - Humboldt, Iowa
- East River Electric Power Cooperative - Madison, South Dakota
- L & O Power Cooperative - Rock Rapids, Iowa
- Northwest Iowa Power Cooperative - LeMars, Iowa
- Rushmore Electric Power Cooperative - Rapid City, South Dakota
- Upper Missouri G&T Electric Cooperative - Sidney, Montana
- Tri-State Generation and Transmission Association - Denver, Colorado

=== Class D Members ===
- Flathead Electric Cooperative - Kalispell & Libby, Montana
- Wyoming Municipal Power Agency - Lusk, Wyoming

== States served by Basin Electric ==
- Colorado
- Iowa
- Minnesota
- Montana
- Nebraska
- New Mexico
- North Dakota
- South Dakota
- Wyoming

== Subsidiary companies ==
- Basin Telecommunications Inc.
- Basin Cooperative Services
- Dakota Gasification Company
- Dakota Coal Company
- Montana Limestone Company
- Prairie Winds ND 1, Inc.
- Prairie Winds SD 1, Inc.
- Souris Valley Pipeline Ltd.

== Board of directors ==
District	Name	Position	Cooperative	Director since
9	Wayne Peltier	President	Direct purchasing cooperatives	2008
1	Kermit Pearson	Vice President	East River Electric	1997
2	Gary Drost	Secretary/Treasury	L & O Power	1999
6	Roberta Rohrer	Assistant Secretary	Central Montana Electric	2004
3	Troy Presser	Director	Central Power Electric Cooperative	2015
4	Don Applegate	Director	Northwest Iowa Power Cooperative	1997
5	Leo Brekel	Director	Tri-State G&T	2014
7	Mike McQuiston	Director	Rushmore Electric	2008
8	Allen Thiessen	Director	Upper Missouri G&T	2012
10	Paul Baker	Director	Powder River Energy Corporation	2013
11	Charlie Gilbert	Director	Corn Belt Power	2009
