= Comanche Electric Cooperative =

Comanche Electric Cooperative, Inc. is a non-profit rural electric utility cooperative headquartered in Comanche, Texas, United States of America.

The cooperative was organized in 1938 through the Rural Electrification Act and serves portions of seven counties in the state of Texas, in a territory generally surrounding Comanche. It was the first REA electric cooperative to have an affiliated women's club.

Comanche is a member of the Brazos Electric Power Cooperative, a generation and transmission electric cooperative. Currently the cooperative has over 4,791 miles of line and 15,886 meters.
