= Central Iowa Power Cooperative =

Iowa cooperative energy provider

Central Iowa Power Cooperative or CIPCO is Iowa's largest cooperative energy provider that generates and transmits power to its member owners. It includes 12 rural and one municipal electric cooperatives which are all located within the state of Iowa.
