= Intertribal Council on Utility Policy =

Native American nonprofit organization

The Intertribal Council on Utility Policy, or Intertribal COUP, is a Native American nonprofit organization founded in 1994. It focuses on energy, telecommunications, and environmental issues affecting member tribes in North Dakota, South Dakota, Nebraska and Wyoming.

The fifteen tribal nations represented in COUP are:

- Cheyenne River
- Flandreau Santee
- Lower Brulé
- Mandan, Hidatsa, and Arikara Nations
- Northern Arapaho
- Omaha
- Rosebud Sioux
- Sisseton
- Spirit Lake Tribe
- Pine Ridge Sioux
- Standing Rock Sioux
- Yankton Sioux

Intertribal COUP owns a major stake in a company that markets carbon offsets and renewable energy credits and funds projects such as wind farms on Indian reservations.

== See also ==
- Council of Energy Resource Tribes
