= Wright-Hennepin Cooperative Electric Association =

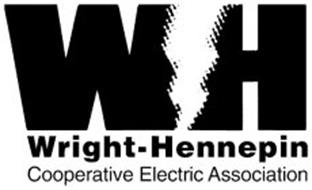
Logo

Wright-Hennepin Cooperative Electric Association (WH) is a non-profit, member-owned energy and service cooperative located in Rockford, Minnesota. The company serves more than 59,000 electric accounts in western Hennepin County, Minnesota and most of Wright County, Minnesota.

== History and background ==
In 1937, farmers in rural Wright and western Hennepin counties tried to get electricity to their homes and farms. The investor-owned utilities would not work with them because they couldn’t profitably serve the rural area, where homes and businesses were further apart and more equipment investments would need to be made.

After that rejection, the farmers joined together and created an electric cooperative. Each person who joined WH became a "member" and took one share of ownership of the cooperative. Nine members are elected to serve on the Board of Directors. They determine the cooperative's strategic direction, provide financial oversight, set electric rates, and provide other governance for the cooperative.
