= Central Power Electric Cooperative =

Central Power Electric Cooperative is a North Dakota-based electrical generation and transmission cooperative founded in 1949 and which is based in Minot, North Dakota. Central Power purchases power from Basin Electric Power Cooperative to serve its six-member rural electric cooperatives. It also built the William J. Neal Station near Voltaire, ND in 1951 to meet its members' needs, with the power being delivered over the lines of the Otter Tail Power Company. When Central Power joined Basin Electric, Neal Station was transferred to Basin as a condition of membership. In its later years, Neal Station was modified to burn sunflower seed hulls in addition to lignite coal, but had been decommissioned and removed by the early 2000s.

Central Power owns and operates over 170 substations, the majority of which are distribution substations across its member cooperatives' territories. The remainder are transmission substations which provide power to the distribution substations. These lines are operated at 230kV, 115kV, 69kV, 57kV, and 41.6kV, and are also interconnected with the Western Area Power Administration, Basin Electric, Otter Tail Power, Montana-Dakota Utilities, and Xcel Energy systems. In recent years, however, some of Central's members experienced a series of territorial disputes with their investor-owned utility neighbors. After these disputes were decided in the investor-owned utilities' favor, Central began an ongoing program to build new transmission lines or realign existing line segments to minimize the degree of integration between Central's and the three investor-owned utilities' systems.

== Member cooperatives ==
Capital Electric Cooperative
Dakota Valley Electric Cooperative - previously James Valley Electric and RSR Electric
McLean Electric Cooperative
North Central Electric Cooperative
Northern Plains Electric Cooperative - previously Baker Electric and Tri-County Electric
Verendrye Electric Cooperative
