= Verendrye Electric Cooperative =

- Headquarters: Velva, North Dakota, U.S.
- Website: verendrye.com

Verendrye Electric Cooperative is a public utility cooperative based in Velva, North Dakota, but also has a service center in Minot. It serves rural consumers across a seven-county area in north central North Dakota, but the bulk of its service area lies within Ward and McHenry counties. Verendrye Electric receives power from the Central Power Electric Cooperative – in fact, Verendrye took the lead in establishing Central Power in 1949 after having to deal with a 30% rate hike from its previous power supplier in 1948.

It is named after the French Canadian explorer La Vérendrye; and for its first two years, it was headquartered in the small town of Verendrye, North Dakota (northwest of Karlsruhe; now a ghost town).
