= Fort Belknap Electric Cooperative =

Rural electric utility cooperative in Texas

- Company type: Utility cooperative
- Industry: Electric power
- Founded: 1939; 86 years ago
- Headquarters: Olney, Texas, United States
- Area served: Austin County; Jack County; Palo Pinto County; Shackelford County; Stephens County; Throckmorton County; Young County
- Website: fortbelknapec.com

Fort Belknap Electric Cooperative, Inc. is a non-profit rural electric utility cooperative headquartered in Olney, Texas.

The Cooperative was organized in 1939 and serves portions of seven counties in the state of Texas, in a territory generally surrounding Olney and including its city limits. It maintains 2,143 miles of electric line and has 6,276 connected meters.

Fort Belknap Electric is a member of the Brazos Electric Power Cooperative, a generation and transmission utility cooperative.
