= Mor-Gran-Sou Electric Cooperative =

Mor-Gran-Sou Electric Cooperative, Inc. is a public utility cooperative based in Flasher, North Dakota, USA. It is one of the electric distribution utilities in south central North Dakota, primarily serving Morton, Grant and Sioux Counties. Mandan is the largest city in its service area, but Flasher is the largest town served by the co-operative. Mor-Gran-Sou Electric is a member of and receives power from Basin Electric Power Cooperative. Mor-Gran-Sou also purchases hydroelectric power from the federal Western Area Power Administration.
