= Brazos Electric Power Cooperative =

Brazos Electric Power Cooperative is an electrical generation and transmission cooperative based in Waco, Texas. In March 2021, it filed for bankruptcy protection as a result of losses arising from the February 2021 North American ice storm.

== Operations ==
In 2013, Brazos began constructing its current headquarters in Waco's Texas Central Industrial park.

Brazos operates four plants which can produce up to 2,909 megawatts of electricity. Brazos was an initial investor in the Comanche Peak Nuclear Generating Station but later sold its interest to TXU. Brazos also began purchasing energy from Duke Energy's Lapetus Solar project in Andrews County, Texas via a power purchase agreement in January 2020.

Brazos serves 16 local utility cooperatives and three municipal-owned electric companies.

== Congressional Testimony ==
In 1967, Brazos sent general manager H. A. Dalton to appear before the 90th United States Congress to give testimony on introduced amendments to the Federal Power Act which were seeking to ensure electrical power service throughout the nation in the event of an emergency. During the hearing Brazos' representative would affirm that the legislation would help prevent power loss, as had been seen during a local blackout in November 1965.

== Lawsuit ==
The Brazos Electric Power Cooperative was brought to court by the Texas Commission on Environmental Quality (TCEQ) over the TECQ denying an ad valorem tax exemption which ultimately would be settled in the Texas Supreme Court in May 2019. In the case, the TCEQ claimed that heat recovery steam generators (HRSGs), devices the Texas Legislature considers "pollution control property," should not be exempt from the previously mentioned tax and that the legislature did not have the ability to give said exemption. The court would rule that the legislature had the ability to exempt such generators and upheld the tax exemption and that the commission had in fact abused its discretion.

== Bankruptcy filing ==
As a result of the February 2021 North American ice storm, Brazos filed for Chapter 11 bankruptcy protection in the U.S. Bankruptcy Court for the Southern District of Texas. Because the storm had severely disrupted energy supplies in Texas for days, leading to a dramatic rise in the price of electricity, the company said it had received invoices from the Electric Reliability Council of Texas (ERCOT) which, when combined, amounted to over $2.1 billion. Brazos said the massive bill forced it to file for bankruptcy protection to shield itself, its member cooperatives, and consumers, from the effect of trying to meet the cost.

== Member cooperatives ==
Bartlett Electric Cooperative
Comanche Electric Cooperative
CoServ Electric
Fort Belknap Electric Cooperative
Hamilton County Electric Cooperative
Heart of Texas Electric Cooperative
HILCO Electric Cooperative
J-A-C Electric Cooperative
MidSouth Synergy
Navarro County Electric Cooperative
Navasota Valley Electric Cooperative
PenTex Energy
South Plains Electric Cooperative
Tri-County Electric Cooperative
United Cooperative Services
Wise Electric Cooperative
