= Wase Wind =

Flemish energy cooperative

Wase Wind cvba

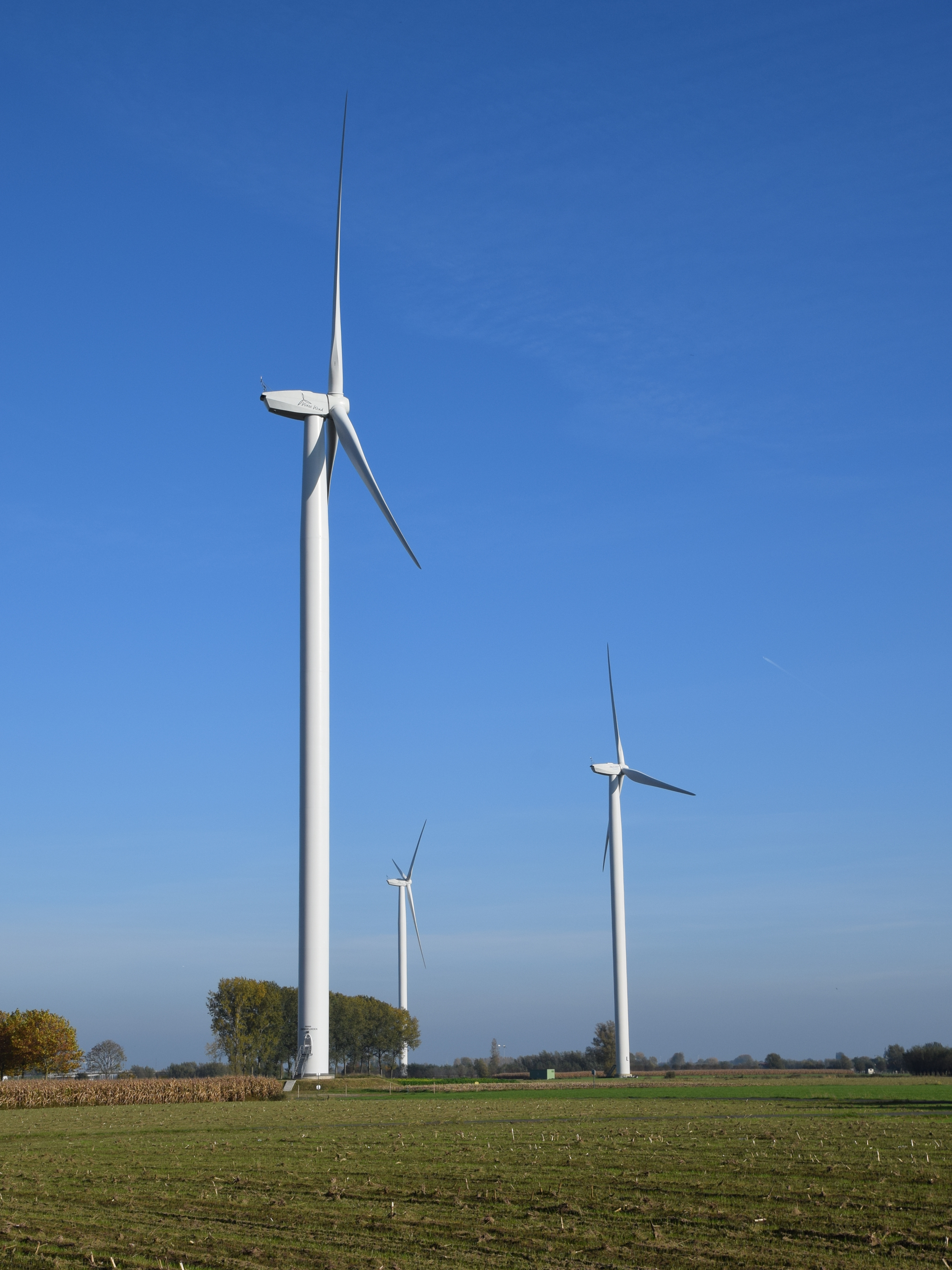
- Wase Wind turbines near Zele
- Type: Cooperative
- Industry: Utility
- Founded: 2001
- Headquarters: Sint-Gillis-Waas, België
- Key people: Kris Aper, Chris Derde, Geert De Roover en Raf Vermeulen
- Products: electricity, wind energy
- Website: wasewind.be

Wase Wind is a Flemish energy cooperative, active in the production of renewable energy and the supply of electricity from wind turbines.

Its headquarters is in the community of Sint-Gillis-Waas, Belgium.

== Business ==
As a cooperative company, it unites the contributions of its shareholders and invests in projects for the realization of renewable energy production, via wind turbines in the region of Waasland.

== History ==
The company was created in 2001, on the initiative of Kris Aper, Chris Derde, Geert De Roover, and Raf Vermeulen.

The cooperative has invested in 4 wind parks in the Waasland, which together produce clean energy for around 2900 members (shareholders / cooperants).
