= Westmill Wind Farm Co-operative =

Community-owned Industrial and Provident Society

Coordinates: 51.6209°N 1.6528°W

- Type: Co-operative
- Industry: Energy
- Founded: 2004
- Headquarters: Watchfield, England
- Key people: Mark Luntley, Chair
- Products: Wind generated electricity
- Website: westmillwind.coop

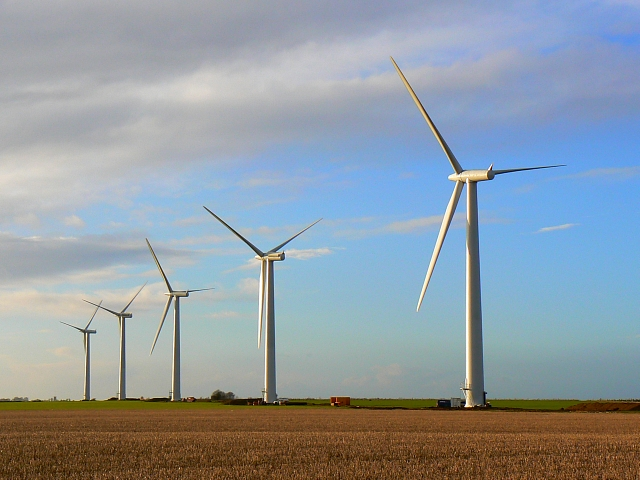
Westmill Wind Farm.

Westmill Wind Farm Co-operative Limited is a community-owned registered society that owns 100% of the Westmill Wind Farm which is an onshore wind farm near the village of Watchfield in the Vale of White Horse, England. It has five 1.3 MW wind turbines erected in a line along the disused runway of the former RAF Watchfield. The wind farm has a power output of up to 6.5 MW, projected to produce as much electricity in a year as used by more than 2,500 homes. The turbines were erected in 8 days and the first fully month of generation was March 2008. It has an open day usually in June each year.

The wind energy co-operative was established in 2004 and currently has approximately 2,200 members. The wind farm is intended to help to reduce dependence on fossil fuels whose emissions are considered to contribute to climate change. In 2007 Westmill Wind Farm Co-operative received a Schumacher Award. Westmill Wind Farm was originally developed by Adam Twine who was in the later stages assisted by Energy4All, a company founded to enable community owned renewable energy projects by Baywind Energy Co-operative.

Westmill Sustainable Energy Trust (WeSET) is a charity formed in 2010 which receives a £6,500 grant from the wind farm's revenue each year. Its objective is to encourage and promote the deployment of sustainable energy, in particular (but not exclusively) within a 25-mile radius from Westmill Wind Farm.

The community-owned Westmill Solar Park is located on an adjoining site. Westmill Woodland Burial Ground, a natural burial site, is also close to the wind farm. In 2019 the Westmill Wind and Solar Co-operatives were both awarded Fair Tax Mark accreditation.
