= Cass County Electric Cooperative =

Public utility cooperative in North Dakota, US

Cass County Electric Cooperative is a public utility cooperative based in Fargo, North Dakota. It serves as the electric distribution utility in a portion of southeast North Dakota, with service stretching from Fargo to Eckelson. It receives power from the Minnkota Power Cooperative.
