= Watchfield =

Village in Oxfordshire, England

Coordinates: 51.612°N 1.641°W

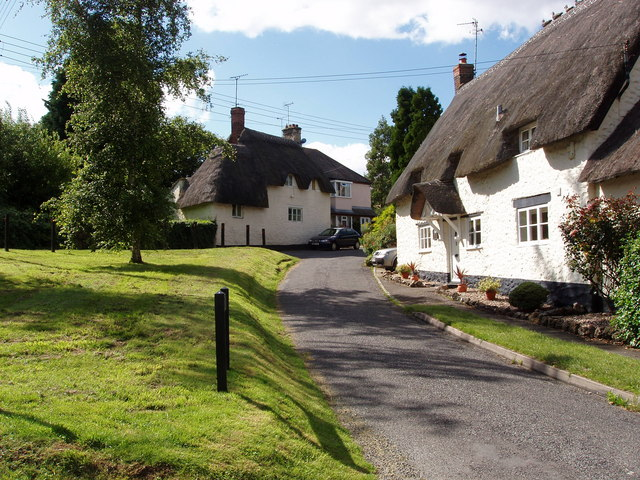
- Oxford Square, Watchfield

- Location within Oxfordshire
- Population: 2,290 (2021)
- OS grid reference: SU248904
- Civil parish: Watchfield
- District: Vale of White Horse
- Shire county: Oxfordshire
- Region: South East
- Country: England
- Sovereign state: United Kingdom
- Post town: Swindon
- Postcode district: SN6
- Dialling code: 01793
- Police: Thames Valley
- Fire: Oxfordshire
- Ambulance: South Central
- UK Parliament: Witney
- Website: Watchfield Parish Council

Watchfield is a village and civil parish in the Vale of White Horse in on the edge of southwest Oxfordshire, southern England, about 3 miles (4.8 km) southeast of Highworth in neighbouring Wiltshire. Watchfield is about 1 mile (1.6 km) north of the village of Shrivenham. Both villages used to be on the main road between Oxford and Swindon, which is now the A420 road. The Vale of White Horse was part of Berkshire until the 1974 boundary changes administratively transferred it to Oxfordshire.

== Toponym ==
Watchfield's toponym evolved from the Old English Wacenesfield in the 8th century via Wachenesfield in the 11th century, Wachenfeud in the 13th century, and Wachfeld, Wasshyngfeld and Watchyingfeld in the 16th century before reaching its present form.

== Churches ==
Watchfield was originally part of the Church of England parish of Shrivenham and therefore villagers were required to worship there at St. Andrew's parish church. The Church of England parish church of Saint Thomas was designed by the Gothic Revival architect G.E. Street in a late 13th-century style. The building, which was completed in 1858, includes a bellcote and a north aisle. St. Thomas's is now part of the Shrivenham and Ashbury Benefice. The Roman Catholic Church of Saint Alban was built in the 20th century.

== Economy and amenities ==
Watchfield consists partly of military accommodation for the Joint Services Command and Staff College (JSCSC) and the Conflict Studies Research Centre (CSRC) in the parish, as well as for the Defence Academy of the United Kingdom and Cranfield University across the boundary in Shrivenham. Local amenities include the Eagle and College Farm public houses, a Midcounties Co-operative convenience store, a unisex hairdresser, optician, a McDonald's, a Subway, and Shrivenham Hundred Business Park which is host to a large number of businesses from small manufacturers to high end technology companies. The village Post Office closed in 2013.

A wind farm, owned by the community-owned Westmill Wind Farm Cooperative, came online in March 2008 and was formally opened in May 2008 on the site of the former RAF Watchfield near the village. It consists of five 1.3 MW turbines, and is described by its promoters as the UK's largest community-owned wind farm. Nearby is Westmill Woodland Burial Ground, a natural burial ground. Adjacent to the wind farm, a solar farm, Westmill Solar Park has also been developed, and this was sold in 2012 to Westmill Solar Co-operative with local investment, to become the UK's first and world's largest community-owned solar farm.

== Watchfield Festival 1975 ==
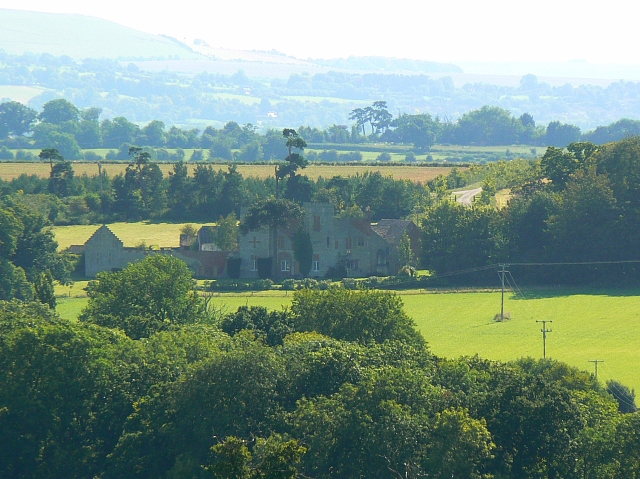
Strattenborough Castle

On 23–31 August 1975, a former military site at Watchfield became the location of the People's Free Festival which had been held during the previous three years, despite opposition, in Windsor Great Park. The Windsor Free Festivals had been violently terminated by the police in 1974. This new site was offered as an alternative venue due to government embarrassment at previous police actions and was attended by several thousand people. Musicians who performed there included Hawkwind and Vivian Stanshall. Watchfield Free Festival was the only free festival to be government sponsored (with assistance by then-Home Secretary Roy Jenkins), or be given official recognition. Later the People's Free Festival at Stonehenge was forcibly terminated at the Battle of the Beanfield. The first Big Green Gathering festival was held at Watchfield in 1994.

== Landmarks ==
A little over a mile to the northwest of the village is Strattenborough Castle, built in 1792 as both a working farm and for the view from Coleshill House.

== Sources ==
- Page, W.H.; Ditchfield, P.H., eds. (1924). A History of the County of Berkshire, Volume 4. Victoria County History. pp. 531–543.
- Pevsner, Nikolaus (1966). Berkshire. The Buildings of England. Harmondsworth: Penguin Books. p. 259.
