= Energy4All =

Energy4All Limited
- Company type: Limited Company
- Industry: Renewable Energy
- Founded: 2002
- Headquarters: Barrow-in-Furness, England
- Area served: United Kingdom
- Products: Community energy projects
- Website: energy4all.coop

Energy4All is a leading facilitator of community-owned renewable energy projects in the United Kingdom. The non-profit organisation is based in Barrow-in-Furness and was founded in 2002 by members of the UK's first wind co-op, the Baywind Energy Co-operative. It has gone on to raise over £100 million in capital on behalf of the Co-operatives and Community Benefit Societies that it supports through community share offerings.

Energy4All is a private limited company and has helped create more than 30 community energy projects, including Westmill Wind Farm Co-operative and Boyndie Wind Farm Co-operative. Energy societies that are part of the Energy4All network include wind power, rooftop solar PV, ground mounted solar PV, biomass district heating and hydropower technology. The energy societies are shareholder members in Energy4All and help to support the development of new energy societies through their membership.

One of the co-operatives it has created, Energy Prospects Co-operative, specialises in taking early stage co-operatives through the development and planning application stages to the point where a community share offer, managed by Energy4All, can be launched to fund the project.

Energy4All won an Ashden Award in 2012, and they were awarded the Outstanding Contribution to Community Energy Award by Community Energy England in 2018. Two members of Energy4All's Board of Directors, Annette Heslop and Mike Smyth, have been awarded an MBE for their services to the environment.

Energy4All was elected to the board of REScoop the European Federation of renewable energy cooperatives in 2017 and is a participant in the MECISE project to develop a European cooperative energy investment fund.

== See also ==
- Renewable energy cooperative
- Community wind energy
- REScoop.eu
