= Northern Plains Electric Cooperative =

Northern Plains Electric Cooperative is a public utility cooperative based in Carrington and Cando, North Dakota. It serves as the electric distribution utility in a portion of east central North Dakota. It receives power from the Central Power Electric Cooperative.

Northern Plains is the largest cooperative in ND land-wise and was created in 1997 from the merger of Baker Electric Cooperative (based in Cando, and which was the first REA-financed electric cooperative in the state) and Tri-County Electric Cooperative (which was established at Glenfield before relocating to Carrington). In 2005, Northern Plains entered into a resource-sharing agreement with its southern neighbor, Dakota Valley Rural Electric Cooperative, that allows them to function as one large cooperative while continuing as two separate companies.
