= Cavalier Rural Electric Cooperative =

Cavalier Rural Electric Cooperative is a public utility cooperative based in Langdon, North Dakota. It serves as the electric distribution utility in a portion of northeast North Dakota, mainly within Cavalier and northern Ramsey counties. Its power supplier is Minnkota Power Cooperative.

The territory currently encompassing Cavalier REC's system was created from portions of two neighboring cooperatives, Baker Electric Cooperative (now part of Northern Plains Electric Cooperative) and Nodak Electric Cooperative. Cavalier is one of the smallest electric cooperatives serving North Dakota.

== Generating rural energy ==
Prior to the 1936 Rural Electrification Act established during the Franklin Roosevelt administration, isolated rural areas were on their own providing energy to their areas.
