= Minnkota Power Cooperative =

Electrical cooperative based in Grand Forks, North Dakota

Minnkota Power Cooperative is an electrical generation and transmission cooperative based in Grand Forks, North Dakota. It wholesales electric power to rural electric cooperatives in North Dakota and Minnesota.

== Member cooperatives ==
Minnesota:

Beltrami Electric Cooperative
Clearwater-Polk Electric Co-op
North Star Electric Cooperative
PKM Electric Cooperative
Red Lake Electric Cooperative
Red River Valley Cooperative Power Association
Roseau Electric Cooperative
Wild Rice Electric Cooperative

North Dakota:

Cass County Electric Cooperative
Cavalier Rural Electric Cooperative
Nodak Electric Cooperative
