= North Central Electric Cooperative =

North Central Electric Cooperative is a rural electric cooperative based in Bottineau, North Dakota. It serves rural consumers in Bottineau County and portions of the counties bordering it. It receives power from the Central Power Electric Cooperative.
