= Capital Electric Cooperative =

Public utility cooperative in North Dakota, US

Capital Electric Cooperative is a public utility cooperative based in Bismarck, North Dakota. It serves customers throughout rural Burleigh County (including parts of Bismarck) and portions of Sheridan and Emmons Counties. It is a member of, and receives power from the Central Power Electric Cooperative.
