= KEM Electric Cooperative =

KEM Electric Cooperative is a public utility cooperative based in Linton, North Dakota, United States. It serves as the electric distribution utility in a portion of south central North Dakota. KEM Electric is a member of and receives its electricity from Basin Electric Power Cooperative. It also is a member of Touchstone Energy. KEM Electric has 7 board members, including 2 At Large members and 1 for each of its 5 districts.
