= Baywind Energy Co-operative =

British wind power generating co-operative

- Company type: Co-operative
- Industry: Energy
- Founded: 1996
- Headquarters: Barrow-in-Furness, England
- Key people: David Eastlick, Chairman
- Products: Wind energy projects
- Website: baywind.coop

Baywind Energy Co-operative was the first co-operative to own wind turbines in the United Kingdom.

Baywind was modelled on the similar wind turbine cooperatives and other renewable energy co-operatives that are common in Scandinavia, and was founded as an Industrial and Provident Society in 1996. It now has 1,200 members, each with one vote. A proportion of the profits is invested in local community environmental initiatives through the Baywind Energy Community Trust. The organisation won the 2004 National Social Enterprise Award for its innovative approach to community owned renewable energy.

Baywind owned a 2.5 megawatt five-turbine wind farm at Harlock Hill near Ulverston, Cumbria (operational since 29 January 1997), and one of the 600 kilowatt turbines at the Haverigg II wind farm near Millom, Cumbria. The Harlock Hill site has now been re-powered with two 2.3 Mwh Enercon turbines, operational from May 2016. The site is now owned by High Winds, a BenCom created under the new legal rules.

Since Baywind's establishment, further wind energy co-operatives have been established, many with the help of the organisation formed by Baywind for this purpose, Energy4All.

== See also ==
- Wind power in the United Kingdom
- Energy policy of the United Kingdom
- Energy use and conservation in the United Kingdom
- Westmill Wind Farm Co-operative
- Community wind energy
