= Dakota Valley Electric Cooperative =

Public utility cooperative in North Dakota, USA

Dakota Valley Electric Cooperative is a public utility cooperative based in Milnor and Edgeley, North Dakota. It serves as the electric distribution utility in a portion of southeast North Dakota. It receives power from the Central Power Electric Cooperative.

Dakota Valley was formed by a merger of the former James Valley Electric Cooperative based in Edgeley and the former RSR Electric Cooperative based in Milnor. In 2005, Dakota Valley entered into a resource-sharing agreement with its northern neighbor, Northern Plains Electric Cooperative, that allows it to function as one large cooperative while remaining two separate companies.
