= McLean Electric Cooperative =

McLean Electric Cooperative is a public utility cooperative based in Garrison, North Dakota. It serves rural consumers in McLean County and portions of Sheridan and Mountrail counties. It receives power from the Central Power Electric Cooperative.
