= Nodak Electric Cooperative =

Public utility cooperative in North Dakota

- Industry: Electrical utility
- Headquarters: Grand Forks, North Dakota, United States
- Area served: Regions of northeast North Dakota

Nodak Electric Cooperative is a public utility cooperative based in Grand Forks, North Dakota, and provides electricity to rural customers and small towns across a portion of northeast North Dakota, and is a member of Minnkota Power Cooperative.

When electric cooperatives began organizing in the late 1930s after the formation of the Rural Electrification Administration and North Dakota's ratification of the Electric Cooperative Corporation Act in 1937, several projects got underway across northeastern North Dakota in 1939. They were Forks (Grand Forks County), Walsh (Walsh County), Red River (Traill County), and Five-Star (Nelson County). These were consolidated into a single project in 1940, as all four projects struggled to secure a reliable source of power, which also led to the formation of Minnkota Power Cooperative later that same year.

A neighboring cooperative, Sheyenne Valley Electric Cooperative, merged into Nodak Electric in 2001.

At the start of 2012, Mylo Einarson was appointed president and CEO of Nodak Electric Cooperative, succeeding George Berg.

In 2018, the Air Force awarded an $85 million contract to Nodak to service electrical lines. In May of 2021, it was reported that Nodak would be providing services to Core Scientific's new data center in Grand Forks.

In June 2023, Grafton, North Dakota approved a three-month deal for Nodak to provide system monitoring and repair services.

Following a June 2025 derecho in North Dakota, in July 2026, Nodak Electric Cooperative received reportedly $334,000 from FEMA for work involving power lines, poles, and insulators.

A 2026 profile on Nodak Electric Cooperative Inc by ProPublica lists it as a non-profit based in Grand Forks, North Dakota. As of 2026, Nodak Electric Cooperative's website stated that it was a part of Touchstone Energy Cooperatives.
