= Dakota Gasification Company =

- Type: Non-profit organization
- Industry: Utilities
- Founded: 1984; 42 years ago
- Headquarters: Beulah, North Dakota, United States
- Area served: North Dakota
- Website: www.dakotagas.com

The Dakota Gasification Company is a synthetic natural gas producing company founded in 1984 in Beulah, North Dakota, United States. It is an operator of the Great Plains Synfuels Plant.

== Processes ==
The plant uses lignite coal to produce synthetic natural gas utilizing a coal gasification process. The plant processes 16 thousand tons of coal daily. Coal is oxidized to coal gas, which is then converted from a mixture of carbon monoxide, carbon dioxide and hydrogen to methane, by hydrogenation over a nickel catalyst. The synthetic natural gas (95% methane, 975 BTU per cubic foot) is pipelined to the Northern Border Pipeline which transports gas from Canada, Montana and North Dakota to the Ventura, Iowa area, where the pipeline interconnects with many pipelines supplying the eastern United States.

The company ships generated byproduct carbon dioxide via a high pressure pipeline to an oilfield in Saskatchewan in Canada where it is used for enhanced oil recovery from the Weyburn oil field near Weyburn, Saskatchewan (Canada).

The plant also produces ammonium sulfate, anhydrous ammonia, phenol, cresylic acid, methanol, and urea naphtha. These materials are by-products of coal gasification. The plant also produces liquid nitrogen, krypton and xenon as a by-product of liquid oxygen production. Oxygen is utilized in the initial oxidation of coal.

== History ==
The Dakota Gasification Company is a subsidiary of the Basin Electric Power Cooperative which is located in Bismarck, North Dakota. On August 16, 2021, it was announced Bakken Energy would be acquiring the Dakota Gasification Company to be transformed to a blue hydrogen project.

== Board of directors ==
The board of Dakota Gasification Company is made up of five directors chosen from among the various directors of Basin Electric plus three additional external directors. Former Governor of Wyoming Jim Geringer currently serves as a director on the board. Senator Heidi Heitkamp served as an external director until December 2012 after she was elected to the U.S. Senate.

Name	Position
Mike McQuistion	Chairman
Tom Wagner	Vice Chairman
Dan Gliko	Treasurer
Paul Baker	Director
Leo Brekel	Director
Charlie Gilbert	Director
Wayne Peltier	Director
Troy Presser	Director
David Meschke	Director
Allen Thiessen	Director
