= Corn Belt Power Cooperative =

Generation and transmission electric cooperative in Iowa, US

- Formation: Tax-exempt since September 1949; 76 years ago
- Type: 501(c)(12)
- Tax ID no.: EIN: 420655796
- Headquarters: Humboldt, Iowa
- Revenue: 171,564,846 USD (2024)
- Expenses: 168,932,021 USD (2024)
- Website: www.cbpower.coop

Corn Belt Power Cooperative is a generation and transmission electric cooperative in northern Iowa. It currently supplies to 12 of its member cooperatives in 28 counties in northern Iowa. It owns and maintains a coal-fired plant and a gas combustion turbine generator and is one of the owners of the Duane Arnold Energy Center. The Cooperative also has access to renewable energy sources such as wind and hydroelectric power.

== History ==
Corn Belt Power Cooperative was founded in 1947 in Humboldt, Iowa. It began operating with 5 employees and 9 diesel plants which were turned over by its parent companies: Federated Cooperative Power Association and Central Electric Federated Cooperative Association.
