= Three Mile Island accident =

1979 nuclear accident in Pennsylvania

Coordinates: 40.15329°N 76.72534°W

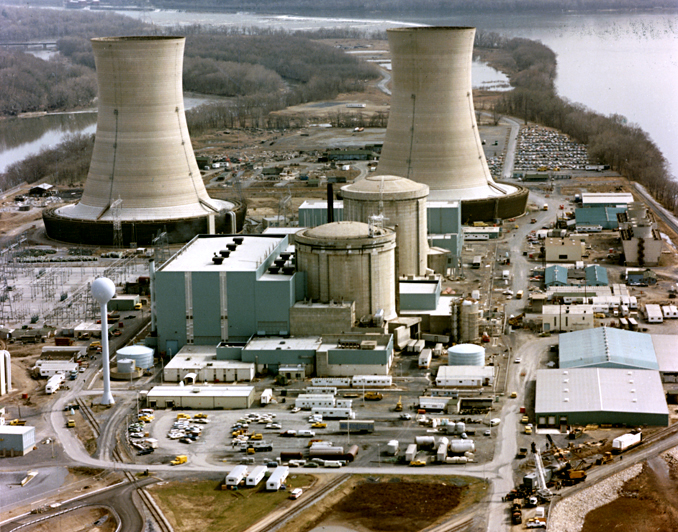
- Three Mile Island nuclear facility, c. 1979
- Date: March 28, 1979 (47 years ago)
- Time: 04:00 (Eastern Time Zone UTC−5)
- Location: Londonderry Township, Dauphin County, Pennsylvania, U.S.
- Outcome: INES Level 5 (accident with wider consequences)

Pennsylvania Historical Marker
- Designated: March 25, 1999

The Three Mile Island accident was a partial nuclear meltdown of the Unit 2 reactor (TMI-2) of the Three Mile Island Nuclear Generating Station, located on the Susquehanna River in Londonderry Township, Dauphin County, near Harrisburg, Pennsylvania. The reactor accident began at 4:00 a.m. on March 28, 1979, and released radioactive gases and radioactive iodine into the environment. It is the worst accident in U.S. commercial nuclear power plant history, although its small radioactive releases had no detectable health effects on plant workers or the public. The accident was the largest release of radioactive material in U.S. history until the Church Rock uranium mill spill four months later. On the seven-point logarithmic International Nuclear Event Scale, the TMI-2 reactor accident is rated Level 5, an "Accident with Wider Consequences".

The accident began with failures in the non-nuclear secondary system, followed by a stuck-open pilot-operated relief valve (PORV) in the primary system, which allowed large amounts of water to escape from the pressurized isolated coolant loop. The mechanical failures were compounded by the initial failure of plant operators to recognize the situation as a loss-of-coolant accident (LOCA). TMI training and operating procedures left operators and management ill-prepared for the deteriorating situation caused by the LOCA. During the accident, those inadequacies were compounded by design flaws, such as poor control design, the use of multiple similar alarms, and a failure of the equipment to indicate either the coolant-inventory level or the position of the stuck-open PORV.

The accident heightened nuclear safety concerns among the general public and led to new regulations for the nuclear industry. It accelerated the decline of efforts to build new reactors. Anti-nuclear movement activists expressed worries about regional health effects from the accident. Some epidemiological studies analyzing the rate of cancer in and around the area since the accident did determine that there was a statistically significant increase in the rate of cancer, while other studies did not. Due to the nature of such studies, a causal connection linking the accident with cancer is difficult to prove. (Note: Attributed to multiple sources:) Cleanup at TMI-2 started in August 1979 and officially ended in December 1993, with a total cost of about $1 billion (equivalent to $2 billion in 2025). TMI-1 was restarted in 1985, then retired in 2019 due to operating losses. It is expected to return to service in either 2027 or 2028 as part of a deal to power Microsoft data centers.

== Accident ==
=== Background ===
A simplified schematic diagram of the TMI-2 plant

In the night hours before the incident, the TMI-2 reactor was running at 97% power while the companion TMI-1 reactor was shut down for refueling. The main chain of events leading to the partial core meltdown on Wednesday, March 28, 1979, began at 4:00:36 a.m. EST in TMI-2's secondary loop, one of the three main water/steam loops in a pressurized water reactor.

The initial cause of the accident happened 11 hours earlier, during an attempt by operators to fix a blockage in one of the eight condensate polishers, the sophisticated filters cleaning the secondary loop water. These filters are designed to stop minerals and other impurities in the water from accumulating in the steam generators and to decrease corrosion rates on the secondary side.

Blockages are common with these resin filters and are usually fixed easily, but in this case, the usual method of forcing the stuck resin out with compressed air did not succeed. The operators decided to blow compressed air into the water and let the force of the water clear the resin. When they forced the resin out, a small amount of water forced its way past a stuck-open check valve and found its way into an instrument air line. This would eventually cause the feedwater pumps, condensate booster pumps, and condensate pumps to turn off around 4:00 a.m., which would, in turn, cause a turbine trip.

=== Reactor overheating and malfunction of relief valve ===
Given that the steam generators were no longer receiving feedwater, heat transfer from the reactor coolant system (RCS) was greatly reduced, and RCS temperature rose. The rapidly heating coolant expanded and surged into the pressurizer, compressing the steam bubble at the top. When RCS pressure rose to 2,255 psi (155.5 bar), the pilot-operated relief valve (PORV) opened, relieving steam through piping to the reactor coolant drain tank in the containment building basement. RCS pressure continued to rise, reaching the reactor protection system high-pressure trip setpoint of 2,355 psi (162.4 bar) eight seconds after the turbine trip. The reactor automatically tripped, its control rods falling into the core under gravity, halting the nuclear chain reaction and stopping the heat generated by fission. However, the reactor continued to generate decay heat, initially equivalent to approximately 6% of the pre-trip power level. Because steam was no longer being used by the turbine and feed was not being supplied to the steam generators, heat removal from the reactor's primary water loop was limited to steaming the small amount of water remaining in the secondary side of the steam generators to the condenser using turbine bypass valves.

When the feedwater pumps tripped, three emergency feedwater pumps started automatically. An operator noted that the pumps were running but did not notice that a block valve was closed in each of the two emergency feedwater lines, blocking emergency feed flow to both steam generators. The valve position lights for one block valve were covered by a yellow maintenance tag. The reason why the operator missed the lights for the second valve is not known, although one theory is that his own large belly hid it from his view. The valves may have been left closed during a surveillance test two days earlier. With the block valves closed, the system was unable to pump water. The closure of these valves was a violation of a key Nuclear Regulatory Commission (NRC) rule, according to which the reactor must be shut down if all auxiliary feed pumps are closed for maintenance. This was later singled out by NRC officials as a key failure.

After the reactor tripped, secondary system steam valves operated to reduce steam generator temperature and pressure, cooling the RCS and lowering RCS temperature, as designed, resulting in a contraction of the primary coolant. With the coolant contraction and loss of coolant through the open PORV, RCS pressure dropped as did pressurizer level after peaking 15 seconds after the turbine trip. Also, 15 seconds after the turbine trip, coolant pressure had dropped to 2,205 psi (152.0 bar), the reset setpoint for the PORV. Electric power to the PORV's solenoid was automatically cut, but the relief valve was stuck open with coolant water continuing to be released.

In post-accident investigations, the indication for the PORV was one of many design flaws identified in the operators' controls, instruments and alarms. There was no direct indication of the valve's actual position. A light on a control panel, installed after the PORV had stuck open during startup testing, came on when the PORV opened. When that light - labeled Light on - RC-RV2 open - went out, the operators believed that the valve was closed. In fact, the light when on only indicated that the PORV pilot valve's solenoid was powered, not the actual status of the PORV. While the main relief valve was stuck open, the operators believed the unlit lamp meant the valve was shut. As a result, they did not correctly diagnose the problem for several hours.

The operators had not been trained to understand the ambiguous nature of the PORV indicator and to look for alternative confirmation that the main relief valve was closed. A downstream temperature indicator, the sensor for which was located in the tail pipe between the pilot-operated relief valve and the pressurizer relief tank, could have hinted at a stuck valve had operators noticed its higher-than-normal reading. It was not, however, part of the "safety grade" suite of indicators designed to be used after an incident, and personnel had not been trained to use it. Its location behind the seven-foot-high instrument panel also meant that it was effectively out of sight.

=== Depressurization of primary reactor cooling system ===
Less than a minute after the beginning of the event, the water level in the pressurizer began to rise, even though RCS pressure was falling. With the PORV stuck open, coolant was being lost from the RCS, a loss-of-coolant accident (LOCA). Expected symptoms for a LOCA were drops in both RCS pressure and pressurizer level. The operators' training and plant procedures did not cover a situation where the two parameters went in opposite directions. The water level in the pressurizer was rising because the steam in the space at the top of the pressurizer was being vented through the stuck-open PORV, lowering the pressure in the pressurizer because of the lost inventory. The lowering of pressure in the pressurizer made water from the coolant loop surge in and created a steam bubble in the reactor pressure vessel head, aided by the decay heat from the fuel.

This steam bubble was invisible for the operators, and this mechanism had not been trained. Indications of high water levels in the pressurizer contributed to confusion, as operators were concerned about the primary loop "going solid", (i.e., no steam pocket buffer existing in the pressurizer) which in training they had been instructed to never allow. This confusion was a key contributor to the initial failure to recognize the accident as a LOCA and led operators to turn off the emergency core cooling pumps, which had automatically started after the PORV stuck and core coolant loss began, due to fears the system was being overfilled.

With the PORV still open, the pressurizer relief tank that collected the discharge from the PORV overfilled, causing the containment building sump to fill and sound an alarm at 4:11 a.m. This alarm, along with higher than normal temperatures on the PORV discharge line and unusually high containment building temperatures and pressures, were clear indications that there was an ongoing LOCA, but these indications were initially ignored by operators. At 4:15 a.m., the relief diaphragm of the pressurizer relief tank ruptured, and radioactive coolant began to leak into the general containment building. This radioactive coolant was pumped from the containment building sump to an auxiliary building, outside the main containment, until the sump pumps were stopped at 4:39 a.m.

=== Partial meltdown and further release of radioactive substances ===
At about 5:20 a.m., after almost 80 minutes with a growing steam bubble in the reactor pressure vessel head, the primary loop's four main reactor coolant pumps began to cavitate as a steam bubble/water mixture, rather than water, passed through them. The pumps were shut down, and it was believed that natural circulation would continue the water movement. Steam in the system prevented flow through the core, and as the water stopped circulating it was converted to steam in increasing amounts. Soon after 6:00 a.m., the top of the reactor core was exposed, and the intense heat caused a reaction to occur between the steam forming in the reactor core and the zircaloy nuclear fuel rod cladding, yielding zirconium dioxide, hydrogen, and additional heat. This reaction melted the nuclear fuel rod cladding and damaged the fuel pellets, which released radioactive isotopes to the reactor coolant and produced hydrogen gas that is believed to have caused a small explosion in the containment building later that afternoon.

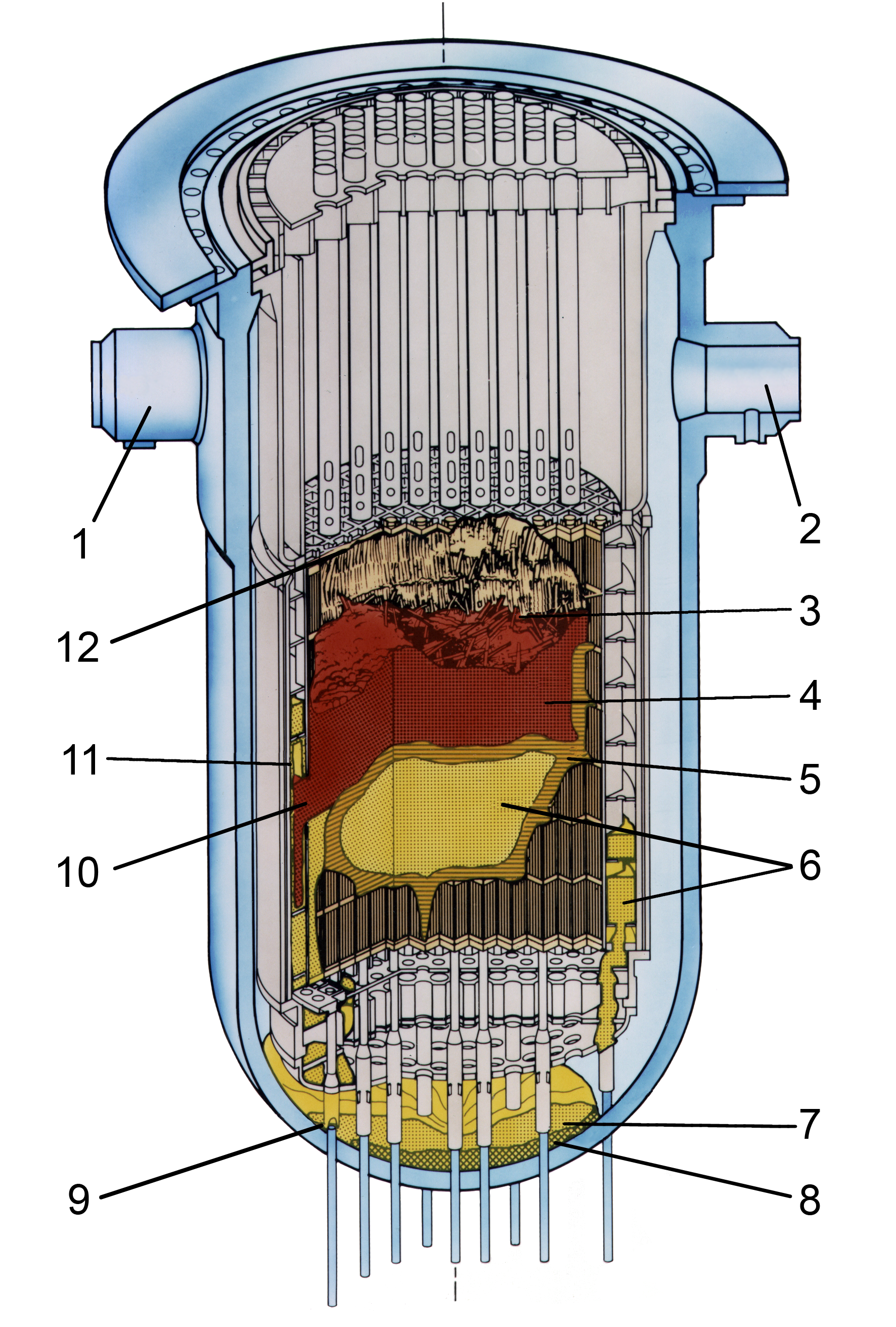
NRC graphic of the TMI-2 core end-state configuration.: 1. 2B inlet; 2. 1A inlet; 3. cavity; 4. loose core debris; 5. crust; 6. previously molten material; 7. lower plenum debris; 8. possible region depleted in uranium; 9. ablated incore instrument guide; 10. hole in baffle plate; 11. coating of previously molten material on bypass region interior surfaces; 12. upper grid damage

At 6:00 a.m. there was a shift change in the control room. A new arrival noticed that the temperatures in the PORV tail pipe and the holding tanks were excessive, and used a backup—called a block valve—to shut off the coolant venting via the PORV, but around 32,000 US gal (120,000 L) of coolant had already leaked from the primary loop. It was not until 6:45 a.m., 165 minutes after the start of the problem, that radiation alarms activated when the contaminated water reached detectors; by that time, the radiation levels in the primary coolant water were around 300 times expected levels, and the general containment building was seriously contaminated with radiation levels of 800 rem/h.

== Emergency declaration and immediate aftermath ==
At 6:56 a.m. a plant supervisor declared a site area emergency, and less than 30 minutes later station manager Gary Miller announced a general emergency. Metropolitan Edison (Met Ed) notified the Pennsylvania Emergency Management Agency, which in turn contacted state and local agencies, Pennsylvania Governor Richard L. Thornburgh and Lieutenant Governor William Scranton III, to whom Thornburgh assigned responsibility for collecting and reporting on information about the accident. The uncertainty of operators at the plant was reflected in fragmentary, ambiguous, or contradictory statements made by Met Ed to government agencies and to the press, particularly about the possibility and severity of off-site radioactivity releases.

Scranton held a press conference in which he was reassuring, yet confused, about this possibility, stating that though there had been a "small release of radiation...no increase in normal radiation levels" had been detected. These were contradicted by another official, and by statements from Met Ed, who both claimed that no radioactivity had been released. Readings from instruments at the plant and off-site detectors had detected radioactivity releases, albeit at levels that were unlikely to threaten public health as long as they were temporary, and providing that containment of the then highly contaminated reactor was maintained.

Angry that Met Ed had not informed them before conducting a steam venting from the plant, and convinced that the company was downplaying the severity of the accident, state officials turned to the NRC. After receiving word of the accident from Met Ed, the NRC had activated its emergency response headquarters in Bethesda, Maryland, and sent staff members to Three Mile Island. NRC chairman Joseph Hendrie and commissioner Victor Gilinsky initially viewed the accident as a "cause for concern but not alarm".

Gilinsky briefed reporters and members of Congress on the situation and informed White House staff, and at 10:00 a.m. met with two other commissioners. However, the NRC faced the same problems in obtaining accurate information as the state and was further hampered by being organizationally ill-prepared to deal with emergencies, as it lacked a clear command structure and did not have the authority either to tell the utility what to do or to order an evacuation of the local area.

In a 2009 article, Gilinsky wrote that it took five weeks to learn that "the reactor operators had measured fuel temperatures near the melting point". He further wrote: "We didn't learn for years—until the reactor vessel was physically opened—that by the time the plant operator called the NRC at about 8:00 a.m., roughly half of the uranium fuel had already melted."

It was still not clear to the control room staff that the primary loop water levels were low and that over half of the core was exposed. A group of workers took manual readings from the thermocouples and obtained a sample of primary loop water. Seven hours into the emergency, new water was pumped into the primary loop and the backup relief valve was opened to reduce pressure so that the loop could be filled with water. After 16 hours, the primary loop pumps were turned on once again, and the core temperature began to fall. A large part of the core had melted, and the system was dangerously radioactive.

On the day following the accident, March 29, control room operators needed to ensure the integrity of the reactor vessel. In order to do this, someone needed to draw a boron concentration sample in order to ensure there was enough of it in the primary system to shut down the reactor entirely. Unit 2's chemistry supervisor, Edward "Ed" Houser, volunteered to draw the sample after his co-workers were hesitant. Shift supervisor Richard Dubiel asked Pete Velez, the radiation protection foreman for Unit 2, to join Houser. Velez would monitor airborne radiation levels and ensure that no overexposure would occur for either of them. (Note: Attributed to multiple sources:)

Wearing excessive amounts of protective clothing—three pairs of gloves, one pair of rubber boots and a respirator—the two navigated the reactor auxiliary building to draw the sample. However, Houser had lost his pocket dosimeter while taking measurements. Houser had noted the sample he drew looked "like Alka-Seltzer" and was highly radioactive, with readings as high as 1,000 rem/h. The two spent five minutes in the building, then withdrew. Houser had gone past the NRC's quarterly dose limit for radiation exposure (3 rem/qtr in 1979) by one and was only admitted back to work the following quarter. (Note: Attributed to multiple sources:)

On the third day following the accident, a hydrogen bubble was discovered in the dome of the pressure vessel and became the focus of concern. A hydrogen explosion could breach the pressure vessel and, depending on its magnitude, might compromise the integrity of the containment building leading to a large-scale release of radioactive material. However, it was determined that there was no oxygen present in the pressure vessel, a prerequisite for hydrogen to burn or explode. Immediate steps were taken to reduce the hydrogen bubble, and by the following day it was significantly smaller. Over the next week, steam and hydrogen were removed from the reactor using a catalytic recombiner and by venting directly into the open air.

=== Identification of released radioactive material ===
The release occurred when the cladding was damaged while the PORV was still stuck open. Fission products were released into the reactor coolant. Since the PORV was stuck open and the loss of coolant accident was still in progress, primary coolant with fission products and/or fuel was released and ultimately ended up in the auxiliary building. The auxiliary building was outside the containment boundary.

This was evidenced by the radiation alarms that eventually sounded. However, since very little of the fission products released were solids at room temperature, very little radiological contamination was reported in the environment. No significant level of radiation was attributed to the TMI-2 accident outside of the TMI-2 facility. According to the Rogovin report, the vast majority of the radioisotopes released were noble gases xenon and krypton resulting in an average dose of 1.4 mrem (14 μSv) to the two million people near the plant. In comparison, a patient receives 3.2 mrem (32 μSv) from a chest X-ray—more than twice the average dose of those received near the plant. On average, a U.S. resident receives an annual radiation exposure from natural sources of about 310 mrem (3,100 μSv).

Within hours of the accident, the United States Environmental Protection Agency (EPA) began daily sampling of the environment at the three stations closest to the plant. Continuous monitoring at 11 stations was established on April 1 and was expanded to 31 stations on April 3. An inter-agency analysis concluded that the accident did not raise radioactivity far enough above background levels to cause even one additional cancer death among the people in the area, but measures of beta radiation were not included because the EPA found no contamination in water, soil, sediment, or plant samples.

Researchers at nearby Dickinson College—which had radiation monitoring equipment sensitive enough to detect Chinese atmospheric atomic weapons-testing—collected soil samples from the area for the ensuing two weeks and detected no elevated levels of radioactivity, except after rainfalls (likely from natural radon plate-out, not the accident). Also, the tongues of white-tailed deer harvested over 50 mi (80 km) from the reactor subsequent to the accident were found to have significantly higher levels of cesium-137 than in deer in the counties immediately surrounding the power plant. Even then, the elevated levels were still below those seen in deer in other parts of the country during the height of atmospheric nuclear weapons testing. Had there been elevated releases of radioactivity, increased levels of iodine-131 and cesium-137 would have been expected to be detected in cattle and goat's milk samples. Elevated levels were not found. A later study noted that the official emission figures were consistent with available dosimeter data, though others have noted the incompleteness of this data, particularly for releases early on.

== Kemeny Commission ==
Several state and federal government agencies mounted investigations into the crisis, the most prominent of which was the President's Commission on the Accident at Three Mile Island, created by U.S. President Jimmy Carter in April 1979. The commission consisted of a panel of 12 people, specifically chosen for their lack of strong pro- or anti-nuclear views, and headed by chairman John G. Kemeny, president of Dartmouth College. It was instructed to produce a final report within six months, and after public hearings, depositions, and document collection, released a completed study on October 31, 1979.

According to the official figures, as compiled by the 1979 Kemeny Commission from Met Ed and NRC data, a maximum of 480 petabecquerels (13 MCi) of radioactive noble gases, primarily xenon, were released by the event. These noble gases were considered relatively harmless, and only 481–629 GBq (13.0–17.0 Ci) of thyroid cancer-causing iodine-131 were released. Total releases according to these figures were a relatively small proportion of the estimated 370 EBq (10 GCi) in the reactor. It was later found that about half the core had melted, and the cladding around 90% of the fuel rods had failed, with 5 ft (1.5 m) of the core gone, and around 20 short tons (18 t) of uranium flowing to the bottom head of the pressure vessel, forming a mass of corium. The reactor vessel—the second level of containment after the cladding—maintained integrity and contained the damaged fuel with nearly all of the radioactive isotopes in the core.

Anti-nuclear political groups disputed the Kemeny Commission's findings, claiming that other independent measurements provided evidence of radiation levels up to seven times higher than normal in locations hundreds of miles downwind from TMI. Arnie Gundersen, a former nuclear industry executive and anti-nuclear advocate, said "I think the numbers on the NRC's website are off by a factor of 100 to 1,000". Gundersen offers evidence, based on pressure monitoring data, for a hydrogen explosion shortly before 2:00 p.m. on March 28, 1979, which would have provided the means for a high dose of radiation to occur. Gundersen cites affidavits from four reactor operators according to which the plant manager was aware of a dramatic pressure spike, after which the internal pressure dropped to outside pressure. Gundersen also claimed that the control room shook and doors were blown off hinges. However, official NRC reports refer merely to a "hydrogen burn".

The Kemeny Commission referred to "a burn or an explosion that caused pressure to increase by 28 pounds per square inch (190 kPa) in the containment building", while The Washington Post reported that "At about 2:00 pm, with pressure almost down to the point where the huge cooling pumps could be brought into play, a small hydrogen explosion jolted the reactor." Work performed for the Department of Energy in the 1980s determined that the hydrogen burn (deflagration), which went essentially unnoticed for the first few days, occurred 9 hours and 50 minutes after initiation of the accident, had a duration of 12 to 15 seconds and did not involve a detonation.

The investigation strongly criticized Babcock & Wilcox, Met Ed, General Public Utilities, and the NRC for lapses in quality assurance and maintenance, inadequate operator training, lack of communication of important safety information, poor management, and complacency, but avoided drawing conclusions about the future of the nuclear industry. The heaviest criticism from the Kemeny Commission said that "... fundamental changes will be necessary in the organization, procedures, and practices—and above all—in the attitudes" of the NRC and the nuclear industry. Kemeny said that the actions taken by the operators were "inappropriate" but that the workers "were operating under procedures that they were required to follow, and our review and study of those indicates that the procedures were inadequate" and that the control room "was greatly inadequate for managing an accident".

The Kemeny Commission noted that Babcock & Wilcox's PORV had previously failed on 11 occasions, nine of them in the open position, allowing coolant to escape. The initial causal sequence of events at TMI had been duplicated 18 months earlier at another Babcock & Wilcox reactor, the Davis–Besse Nuclear Power Station. The only differences were that the operators at Davis–Besse identified the valve failure after 20 minutes, where at TMI it took 80 minutes, and the fact that the Davis–Besse facility was operating at 9% power, against TMI's 97%. Although Babcock engineers recognized the problem, the company failed to clearly notify its customers of the valve issue.

The Pennsylvania House of Representatives conducted its own investigation, which focused on the need to improve evacuation procedures.

In 1985, a television camera was used to see the interior of the damaged reactor. In 1986, core samples and samples of debris were obtained from the corium layers on the bottom of the reactor vessel and analyzed.

== Mitigation policies ==
=== Voluntary evacuation ===
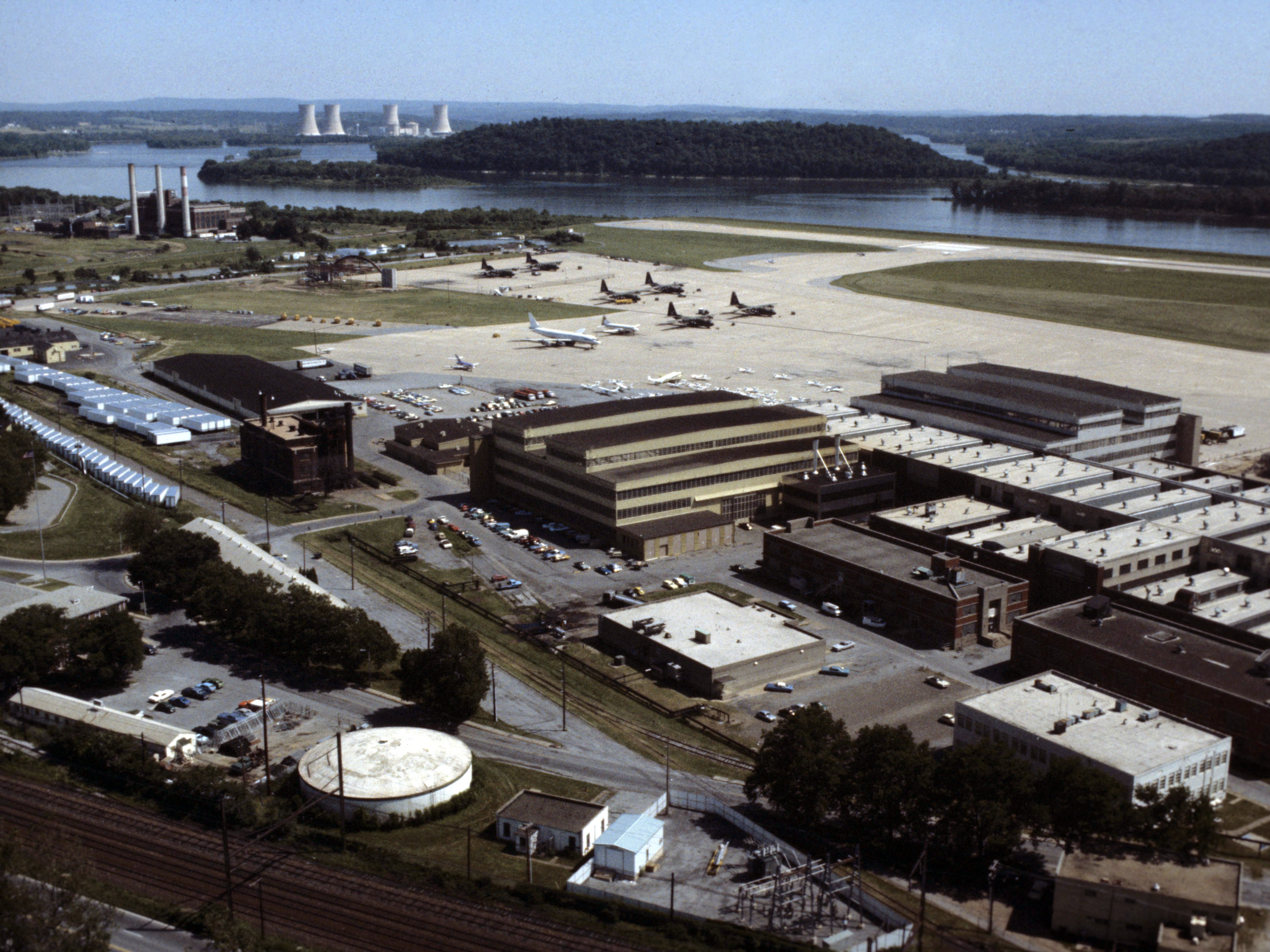
Three Mile Island in background behind Harrisburg International Airport, a few weeks after the accident

On Wednesday, March 28, hours after the accident began, Lieutenant Governor Scranton appeared at a news briefing to say that Met Ed had assured the state that "everything is under control". Later that day, Scranton changed his statement, saying that the situation was "more complex than the company first led us to believe". There were conflicting statements about radioactivity releases. Schools were closed, and residents were urged to stay indoors. Farmers were told to keep their animals under cover and on stored feed.

Based on the advice of the Chairman of the NRC and in the interest of taking every precaution, I am advising those who may be particularly susceptible to the effects of any radiation, that is, pregnant women and pre-school aged children, to leave the area within a five-mile radius of the Three Mile Island facility until further notice. We've also ordered the closings of any schools within this area.

— Dick Thornburgh

Governor Thornburgh, on the advice of NRC chairman Joseph Hendrie, advised the evacuation "of pregnant women and pre-school age children...within a five-mile radius of the Three Mile Island facility". The evacuation zone was extended to a 20-mile radius on March 30. Within days, 140,000 people had left the area. More than half of the 663,500 population within the 20-mile radius remained in that area. According to a survey conducted in April 1979, 98% of the evacuees had returned to their homes within three weeks.

Post-TMI surveys have shown that less than 50% of the American public were satisfied with the way the accident was handled by Pennsylvania state officials and the NRC, and people surveyed were even less pleased with the utility (General Public Utilities) and the plant designer.

=== Effect on nuclear power industry ===
Global history of the use of nuclear power. The Three Mile Island accident is one of the factors cited for the decline of new reactor construction.

According to the IAEA, the Three Mile Island accident was a significant turning point in the global development of nuclear power. From 1963 to 1979, the number of reactors under construction globally increased every year except in 1971 and 1978. However, following the event, the number of reactors under construction in the U.S. declined from 1980 to 1998, with increasing construction costs and delayed completion dates for some reactors. Many similar Babcock & Wilcox reactors on order were canceled. In total, 52 U.S. nuclear reactors were canceled between 1980 and 1984.

The accident did not initiate the demise of the U.S. nuclear power industry, but it did halt its historic growth. Additionally, as a result of the earlier 1973 oil crisis and post-crisis analysis with conclusions of potential overcapacity in base load, 40 planned nuclear power plants already had been canceled before the accident. At the time of the incident, 129 nuclear power plants had been approved, but of those, only 53 which were not already operating were completed. During the lengthy review process, complicated by the Chernobyl disaster seven years later, federal requirements to correct safety issues and design deficiencies became more stringent, local opposition became more stringent, construction times were significantly lengthened and costs skyrocketed. Until 2012, no U.S. nuclear power plant had been authorized to begin construction since the year before, 1978. Globally, the end of the increase in nuclear power plant construction came with the more catastrophic Chernobyl disaster in 1986 (see graph).

=== Cleanup ===
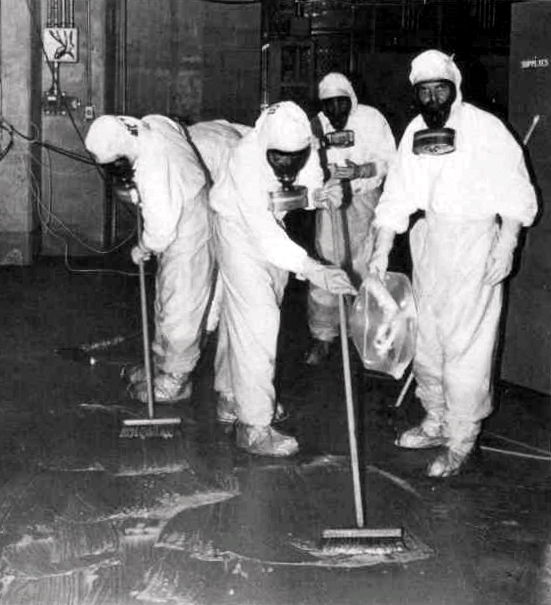
A clean-up crew working to remove radioactive contamination at Three Mile Island

Initially, GPU planned to repair the reactor and return it into service. However, TMI-2 was too badly damaged and contaminated to resume operations; the reactor was gradually deactivated and permanently closed. TMI-2 had been online for only three months but now had a ruined reactor vessel and a containment building that was unsafe to walk in. Cleanup started in August 1979 and officially ended in December 1993, with a total cleanup cost of about $1 billion. Benjamin K. Sovacool, in his 2007 preliminary assessment of major energy accidents, estimated that the TMI accident caused a total of $2.4 billion in property damages.

Efforts focused on the cleanup and decontamination of the site, especially the defueling of the damaged reactor. Starting in 1985, almost 100 short tons (91 t) of radioactive fuel were removed from the site. Planning and work was partially hampered by too-optimistic views about the damage.

In 1988, the NRC announced that, although it was possible to further decontaminate the Unit 2 site, the remaining radioactivity had been sufficiently contained as to pose no threat to public health and safety. The first major phase of the cleanup was completed in 1990, when workers finished shipping 150 short tons (140 t) of radioactive wreckage to Idaho for storage at the Department of Energy's National Engineering Laboratory. However, the contaminated cooling water that leaked into the containment building had seeped into the building's concrete, leaving the radioactive residue too impractical to remove. Accordingly, further cleanup efforts were deferred to allow for decay of the radiation levels and to take advantage of the potential economic benefits of retiring both Unit 1 and Unit 2 together.

=== Health effects and epidemiology ===
In the aftermath of the accident, investigations focused on the amount of radioactivity released. In total, approximately 2.5 megacuries (93 PBq) of radioactive gases and approximately 15 curies (560 GBq) of iodine-131 were released into the environment. According to the American Nuclear Society, using the official radioactivity emission figures, "The average radiation dose to people living within 10 miles of the plant was eight millirem (0.08 mSv), and no more than 100 millirem (1 mSv) to any single individual. Eight millirem is about equal to a chest X-ray, and 100 millirem is about a third of the average background level of radiation received by US residents in a year."

According to health researcher Joseph Mangano, early scientific publications estimated no additional cancer deaths in the 10 mi (16 km) area around TMI, based on these numbers. Disease rates in areas farther than 10 miles from the plant were not examined. Local activism in the 1980s, based on anecdotal reports of negative health effects, led to scientific studies being commissioned. A variety of epidemiology studies have concluded that the accident had no observable long-term health effects. (Note: Attributed to multiple sources:)

A peer-reviewed research article by Dr. Steven Wing found a significant increase in cancers between 1979 and 1985 among people who lived within ten miles of TMI. In 2009, Dr. Wing stated that radiation releases during the accident were probably "thousands of times greater" than the NRC's estimates. A retrospective study of the Pennsylvania Cancer Registry found an increased incidence of thyroid cancer in some counties south of TMI (although, notably, not in Dauphin County where the reactor was located) and in high-risk age groups but did not draw a causal link between these incidences and the accident. The Talbott lab at the University of Pittsburgh reported finding a few, small increased cancer risks within the TMI population. A more recent study reached "findings consistent with observations from other radiation-exposed populations," raising "the possibility that radiation released from [Three Mile Island] may have altered the molecular profile of [thyroid cancer] in the population surrounding TMI", establishing a potential causal mechanism, although not definitively proving causation.

The Radiation and Public Health Project, an organization with little credibility among epidemiologists, cited calculations by Mangano that showed a spike in infant mortality in downwind communities two years after the accident. Anecdotal evidence also records effects on the region's wildlife. John Gofman used his own, non-peer reviewed low-level radiation health model to predict 333 excess cancer or leukemia deaths from the 1979 Three Mile Island accident. The ongoing TMI epidemiological research has been accompanied by a discussion of problems in dose estimates due to a lack of accurate data, as well as illness classifications.

=== Activism and legal action ===
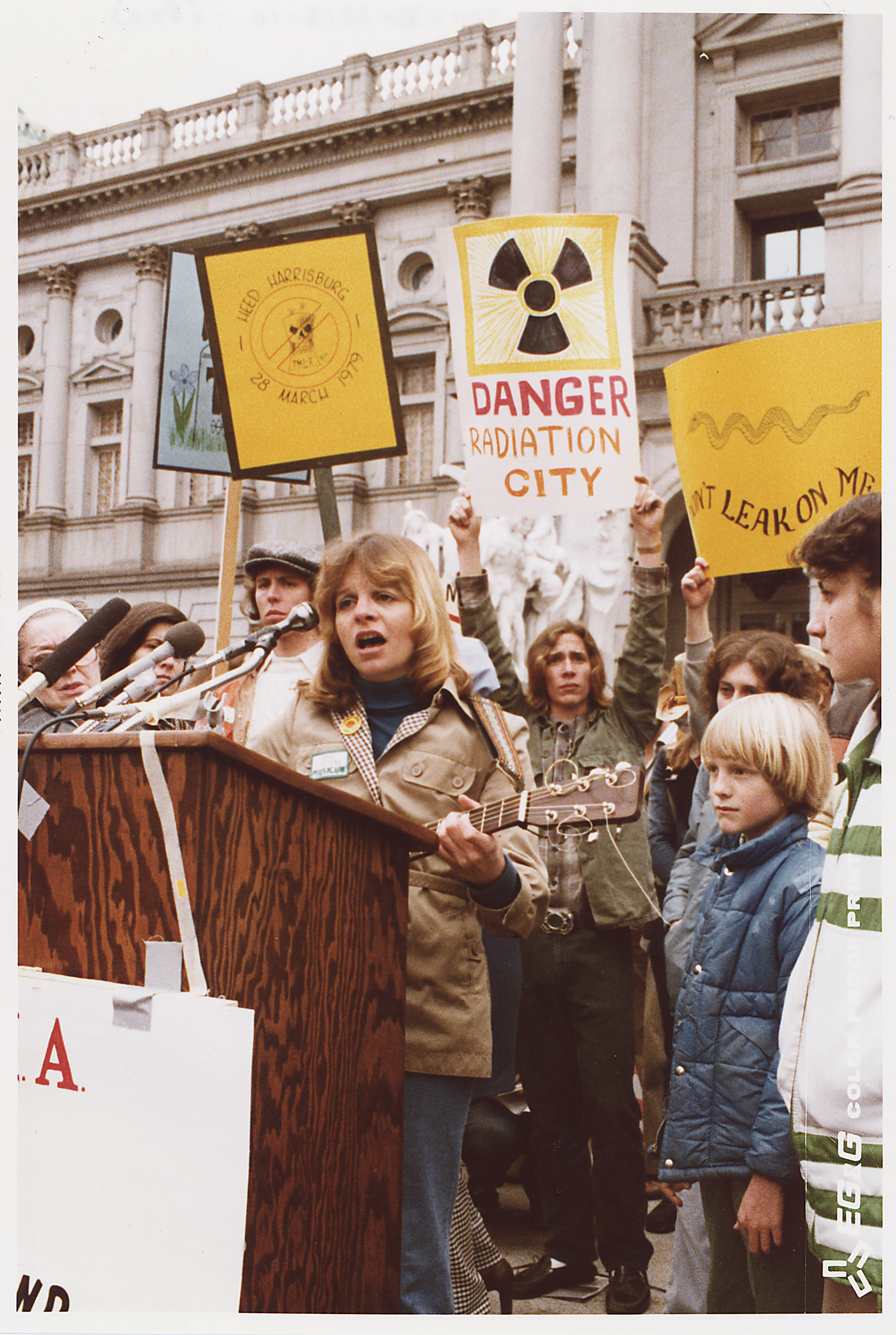
Anti-nuclear protest in Harrisburg, Pennsylvania at the state capitol following the Three Mile Island accident; April 9, 1979

The accident enhanced the perceived credibility of anti-nuclear groups and triggered protests around the world. President Carter—who had specialized in nuclear power while in the United States Navy—told his cabinet after visiting the plant that the accident was minor but reportedly declined to do so in public, in order to avoid offending Democrats who opposed nuclear power.

Members of the American public, concerned about the release of radioactive gas from the accident, staged numerous anti-nuclear demonstrations across the country in the following months. The largest demonstration was held in New York City in September 1979 and involved 200,000 people, with speeches given by Jane Fonda and Ralph Nader. The New York rally was held in conjunction with a series of nightly "No Nukes" concerts given at Madison Square Garden from September 19 to 23 by Musicians United for Safe Energy. In the previous May, an estimated 65,000 people—including California Governor Jerry Brown—attended a march and rally against nuclear power in Washington, D.C.

In 1981, citizens' groups succeeded in a class action suit against TMI, winning $25 million in an out-of-court settlement. Part of this money was used to found the TMI Public Health Fund. In 1983, a federal grand jury indicted Metropolitan Edison on criminal charges for the falsification of safety test results prior to the accident. Under a plea-bargaining agreement, Met Ed pleaded guilty to one count of falsifying records and no contest to six other charges, four of which were dropped, and agreed to pay a $45,000 fine and set up a $1 million account to help with emergency planning in the area surrounding the plant.

According to Eric Epstein, chair of Three Mile Island Alert, the TMI plant operator and its insurers paid at least $82 million in publicly documented compensation to residents for "loss of business revenue, evacuation expenses and health claims." However, a class action lawsuit alleging that the accident caused detrimental health effects was rejected by Harrisburg United States district court Judge Sylvia Rambo, and the final appeal of that decision failed in 2002.

=== Normal accident theory ===
The Three Mile Island accident inspired Charles Perrow's normal accident theory, which attempts to describe "unanticipated interactions of multiple failures in a complex system". TMI was an example of this type of accident because it was "unexpected, incomprehensible, uncontrollable and unavoidable."

Perrow concluded that the failure at Three Mile Island was a consequence of the system's immense complexity. Such modern high-risk systems, he realized, were prone to failures however well they were managed. It was inevitable that they would eventually suffer what he termed a 'normal accident'. Therefore, he suggested, we might do better to contemplate a radical redesign, or if that was not possible, to abandon such technology entirely.

"Normal" accidents, or system accidents, are so called by Perrow because such accidents are inevitable in extremely complex systems. Given the characteristic of the system involved, multiple failures that interact with each other will occur, despite efforts to avoid them. Events which appear trivial initially cascade and multiply unpredictably, creating a much larger catastrophic event.

Normal Accidents contributed key concepts to a set of intellectual developments in the 1980s that revolutionized the conception of safety and risk. It made the case for examining technological failures as the product of highly interacting systems, and highlighted organizational and management factors as the main causes of failures. Technological disasters could no longer be ascribed to isolated equipment malfunction, operator error or acts of God.

=== Comparison to U.S. Navy operations ===
After the TMI incident, President Carter commissioned a study, Report of the President's Commission on the Accident at Three Mile Island (1979).

Admiral Hyman G. Rickover was later asked to tell Congress why naval nuclear propulsion (as used in submarines) had suffered no reactor accidents, defined as the uncontrolled release of fission products to the environment resulting from damage to a reactor core. In his testimony, Rickover said:

Over the years, many people have asked me how I run the Naval Reactors Program, so that they might find some benefit for their own work. I am always chagrined at the tendency of people to expect that I have a simple, easy gimmick that makes my program function. Any successful program functions as an integrated whole of many factors. Trying to select one aspect as the key one will not work. Each element depends on all the others.

== 21st century status ==
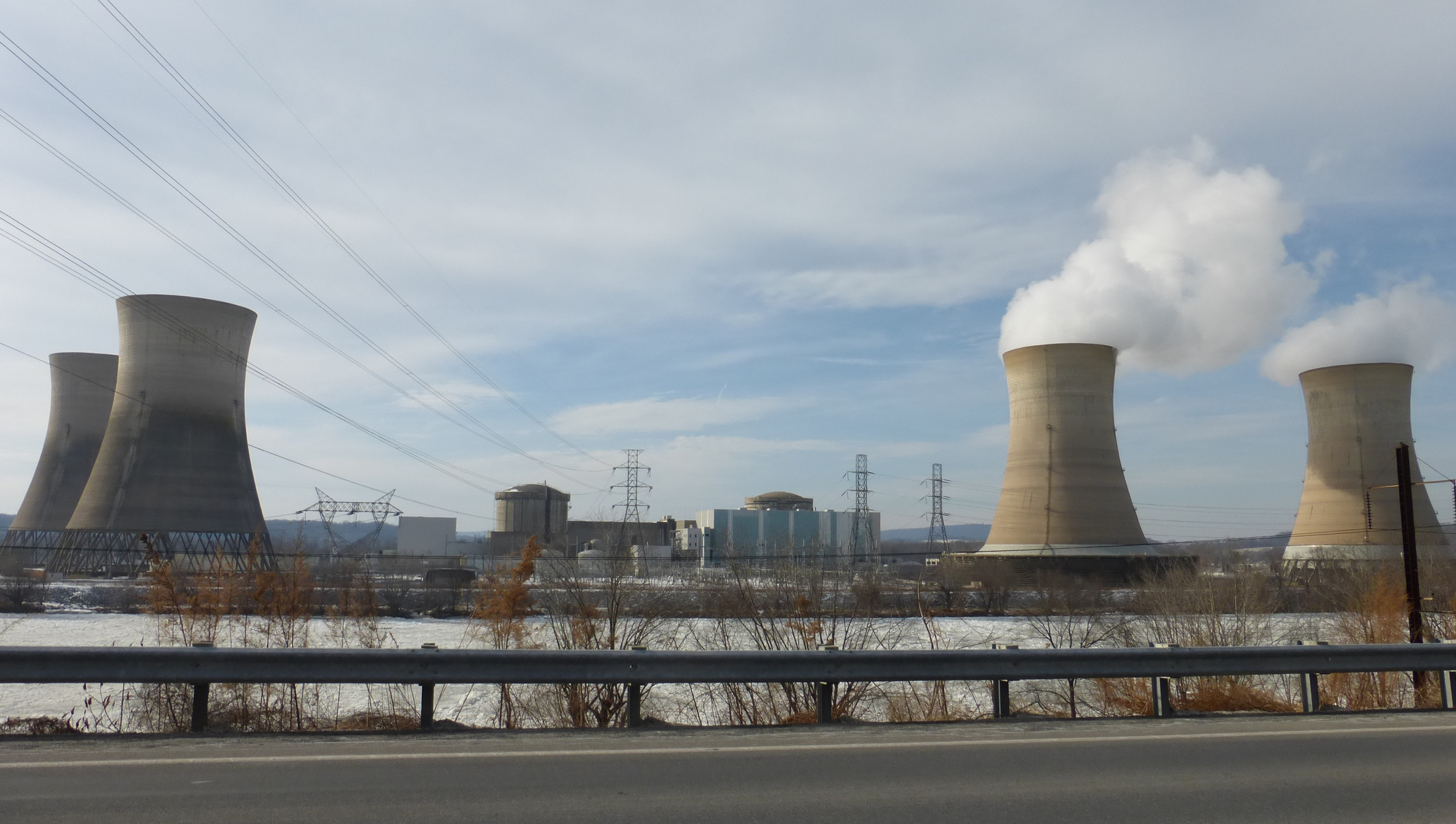
After the accident, Three Mile Island used only one nuclear generating station, TMI-1, which is on the right. TMI-2, to the left, has not been used since the accident.

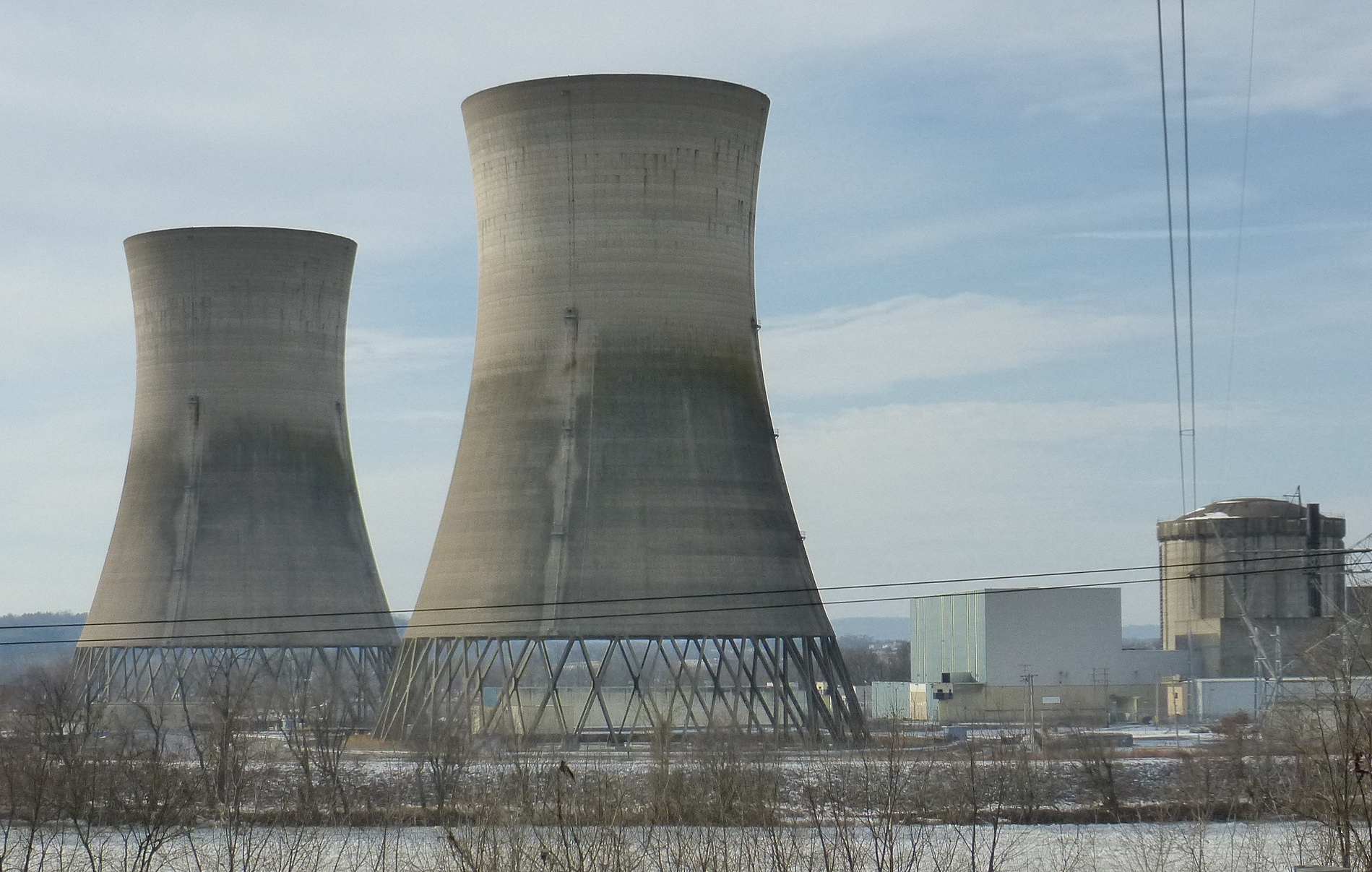
TMI-2 in February 2014. The cooling towers are on the left. The spent fuel pool with containment building of the reactor is on the right.

After the incident at TMI-2, the NRC suspended the license to operate TMI-1, which was owned and operated by Met Ed, one of General Public Utilities Corporation's regional utility operating companies. In 1982, the citizens of the three counties surrounding the site voted overwhelmingly in a non-binding resolution to retire Unit 1 permanently. In 1985, a 4–1 vote by the Nuclear Regulatory Commission allowed TMI-1 to resume operations.

GPU formed General Public Utilities Nuclear Corporation as a subsidiary to own and operate the company's nuclear facilities, including Three Mile Island. In 1996, General Public Utilities shortened its name to GPU Inc. In 1998, GPU sold TMI-1 to AmerGen Energy Corporation, a joint venture between Philadelphia Electric Company and British Energy. (GPU was legally obliged to continue to maintain and monitor TMI-2.) In 2001, GPU was acquired by FirstEnergy Corporation and dissolved, and the maintenance and administration of Unit 2 was contracted to AmerGen.

In 2000, Philadelphia Electric merged with Unicom Corporation to form Exelon. In 2003, Exelon bought the remaining shares of AmerGen from British Energy. In 2009, Exelon Nuclear absorbed and dissolved AmerGen. Along with TMI Unit 1, Exelon Nuclear operates Clinton Power Station and several other nuclear facilities. (Note: Attributed to multiple sources:)

Unit 2 continues to be licensed and regulated by the Nuclear Regulatory Commission in a condition known as Post Defueling Monitored Storage. The TMI-2 reactor has been permanently shut down with the reactor coolant system drained, the radioactive water decontaminated and evaporated, radioactive waste shipped off-site, reactor fuel and most core debris shipped off-site to a Department of Energy facility, and the remainder of the site being monitored. The owner planned to keep the facility in long-term, monitoring storage until the operating license for the TMI-1 plant expired, at which time both plants would be decommissioned.

In 2009, the NRC granted a license extension which allowed the TMI-1 reactor to operate until April 19, 2034. In 2017, it was announced that operations would cease by 2019 due to financial pressure from inexpensive natural gas, unless lawmakers stepped in to keep it open. When it became clear that the subsidy legislation would not pass, Exelon decided to retire the plant. TMI Unit 1 shut down on September 20, 2019. Following the permanent shutdown, Unit 1 is in decommissioning, moving to SAFSTOR status.

In 2020 the site was purchased by TMI-2 Solutions, a subsidiary of EnergySolutions, with the intent of cleaning up the site for less money than is available in a dedicated fund. On May 8, 2023, TMI-2 Solutions announced that 99% of the nuclear fuel has been cleaned up and that the site has entered the next phase of clean-up that will last until 2029. TMI-2 Solutions planned to finish clean-up and demolish the plant by 2052.

In September 2024, Constellation Energy announced plans to restart the Three Mile Island nuclear plant to sell the power to Microsoft for artificial intelligence data centers. Constellation expects the Unit 1 reactor at Three Mile Island to come back online in 2027, subject to approval by the Nuclear Regulatory Commission. Constellation also plans to apply to extend the plant's operations to at least 2054.

On the same day of the announcement of a restart The Department of Justice stated that Muggleston sold 500 call option contracts which he held in the energy company. These call option contracts went for a total of $1,480,380.67. This caused a SEC lawsuit which alleged that Muggleston wanted profit off of TMI. The Department of Justice charged Muggleston for security fraud and four counts of insider trading. Muggleston is no longer employed by Constellation Energy and they were aware of Muggleston's indictment. Constellation Energy plans to have the reactor at the renamed The Crane Energy Center and to be online by 2028.

== Timeline ==
Date	Event
1968–1970	Construction
April 1974	Reactor-1 online
February 1978	Reactor-2 online
March 1979	TMI-2 accident occurred. Containment coolant released into environment.
April 1979	Containment steam vented to the atmosphere in order to stabilize the core.
July 1980	Approximately 1,591 TBq (43,000 curies) of krypton were vented from the reactor building.
July 1980	The first manned entry into the reactor building took place.
November 1980	An Advisory Panel for the Decontamination of TMI-2, composed of citizens, scientists, and state and local officials, held its first meeting in Harrisburg, Pennsylvania.
December 1980	U.S. 96th Congressional session passed U.S. legislation establishing a five-year nuclear safety, research, demonstration, and development program.
July 1984	The reactor vessel head (top) was removed.
October 1985	Defueling began.
July 1986	The off-site shipment of reactor core debris began.
August 1988	GPU submitted a request for a proposal to amend the TMI-2 license to a "possession-only" license and to allow the facility to enter long-term monitoring storage.
January 1990	Defueling was completed.
July 1990	GPU submitted its funding plan for placing $229 million in escrow for radiological decommissioning of the plant.
January 1991	The evaporation of accident-generated water began.
April 1991	NRC published a notice of opportunity for a hearing on GPU's request for a license amendment.
February 1992	NRC issued a safety evaluation report and granted the license amendment.
August 1993	The processing of accident-generated water was completed involving 2.23 million gallons.
September 1993	NRC issued a possession-only license.
September 1993	The Advisory Panel for Decontamination of TMI-2 held its last meeting.
December 1993	Post-Defueling Monitoring Storage began.
October 2009	TMI-1 license extended from April 2014 until 2034.
May 2019	TMI-1 is announced to be closed in September 2019.
September 2019	TMI-1 shutdown at noon on September 20, 2019.
September 2024	Constellation signed a twenty year power deal to bring back TMI-1

== Documentaries ==
Meltdown: Three Mile Island is a four-part docuseries released by Netflix on May 4, 2022. The documentary recounts the events, controversies, and lingering effects of the accident. Featured in the series are Rick Parks, a TMI nuclear engineer turned whistleblower against Bechtel; Lake Barrett, an independent energy consultant who served as the NRC's on-site director for the TMI-2 cleanup; Eric Epstein, chairman of TMI Alert, a nuclear watchdog organization in central Pennsylvania; Michio Kaku, an American theoretical physicist and critic of nuclear power; and residents of the communities affected by the event.

Radioactive: The Women of Three Mile Island is a 2023 documentary about the accident.

== In popular culture ==
On March 15, 1979, twelve days before the accident, the movie The China Syndrome premiered and was initially met with backlash from the nuclear power industry, claiming it to be "sheer fiction" and a "character assassination of an entire industry". In the film, television reporter Kimberly Wells (Jane Fonda) and her cameraman Richard Adams (Michael Douglas) secretly film a major accident at a nuclear power plant while taping a series on nuclear power. At one point in the film, an official tells Wells that an explosion at the plant "could render an area the size of the state of Pennsylvania permanently uninhabitable". After the release of the film, Fonda began lobbying against nuclear power. In an attempt to counter her efforts, Edward Teller (nuclear physicist, government science adviser, and contributor to the Teller–Ulam thermonuclear bomb design), personally lobbied in favor of nuclear power. Teller suffered a heart attack shortly after the incident and joked that he was the only person whose health was affected.

The 2009 superhero film X-Men Origins: Wolverine portrays Three Mile Island in the 1970s serving as a mutant prison run by the film's main antagonist William Stryker and his team of scientists, where they experimented on and combined the mutants' powers for the Weapon X and Weapon XI programs. The film portrays the 1979 accident being caused by the destruction from a battle between the characters Wolverine, Sabretooth, and Deadpool.

== See also ==
- Church Rock uranium mill spill, New Mexico
- Forked River Nuclear Power Plant, New Jersey
- Nuclear reactor accidents in the United States
- Nuclear energy policy of the United States
- Nuclear safety in the United States
- Three Mile Island: Thirty Minutes to Meltdown
- WASH-1400 – NRC report predicting risks that led to this accident
- Karen Silkwood
- Chernobyl nuclear disaster

General:

- List of civilian nuclear accidents
- Lists of nuclear disasters and radioactive incidents
- Nuclear and radiation accidents and incidents
- Nuclear safety and security
- Process control
