= John Rowe (Exelon) =

American business executive (1945–2022)

- Born: John William Rowe; 1945; Dodgeville, Wisconsin, U.S.
- Died: September 24, 2022 (aged 77); Naples, Florida, U.S.
- Education: University of Wisconsin–Madison
- Occupations: Chairman and CEO of Exelon Corp.
- Spouse: Jeanne Rowe
- Children: 1

John William Rowe (1945 – September 24, 2022) was an American attorney and energy executive. He served as the chairman and chief executive officer of the energy corporation Exelon Corporation, a utility holding company headquartered in Chicago that had the largest market capitalization in the electric utility industry.

== Early life and education ==
Rowe was born in Dodgeville, Wisconsin, in 1945. He was raised on a farm close to his hometown. He graduated with a bachelor's degree in history from the University of Wisconsin in 1967. He was then accepted into the University of Wisconsin Law School and obtained a Juris Doctor three years later. During this time, he was elected to Phi Beta Kappa society and the Order of the Coif.

== Career ==
After graduating, Rowe first worked as an associate for Isham Lincoln & Beale starting in 1970. He was promoted to partner seven years later and remained with the firm until 1980. He represented Commonwealth Edison, as well as the bankruptcy trustee of Milwaukee Road. Rowe then worked as an in-house counsel for Conrail from 1980 to 1984.

Rowe transitioned from the legal sector to energy and relocated to the East Coast in 1984, when he was appointed chief executive officer (CEO) of Central Maine Power. Five years later, he became CEO of New England Electric System, after his predecessor died in a lightning strike. After nearly a decade in that capacity, he went back to Chicago in 1998 to become CEO of Unicom Corp, the parent of Commonwealth Edison (ComEd). The company had expensive and faulty nuclear power plants that operated at 49 percent capacity at the time, coupled with recurring outages due to postponed maintenance. This drew the ire of mayor Richard M. Daley, with the city contemplating operating its own electrical system. Some of Rowe's early initiatives included upgrading infrastructure, hiring new managers, and reversing the fortunes of ComEd's nuclear operations. His decision to sell the company's fossil fuel fleet significantly decreased its reliance on coal to 6 percent of its portfolio.

ComEd ultimately merged with PECO Energy Company in 2000 to form Exelon, with Rowe succeeding Corbin McNeill as CEO. Under his leadership, the company became the first in the energy sector to sign up to the U.S. Climate Action Partnership. In both 2008 and 2009, Institutional Investor named Rowe the best electric utilities chief executive officer in America. He was also a commissioner on President Barack Obama's Blue Ribbon Commission on America's Nuclear Future which provided policy recommendations to the president regarding the storage of nuclear waste, nuclear recycling / reprocessing and nuclear reactor technology. Rowe was noted for his vocal support of the proposed cap and trade mechanism for carbon emission control. His company left the United States Chamber of Commerce over the latter's highly public opposition to cap and trade. He oversaw Exelon's purchase of Constellation Energy Group in a 2008 deal worth $8 billion. He retired four years later after the merger was completed.

=== Compensation ===
While chief executive officer of Exelon in 2009, Rowe earned a total compensation of $12,036,882, which included a base salary of $1,468,077, a cash bonus of $1,573,825, stocks granted of $6,341,383, and options granted of $2,236,650.

== Philanthropy ==
Along with his wife and son, Rowe formed the Rowe Family Charitable Trust. It established the Rowe Professorship of Architecture and the Rowe Family Endowed Chair in Sustainable Energy at the Illinois Institute of Technology, the Rowe Professorship of Byzantine History and the Rowe Family Professorship in Greek History at the University of Wisconsin, the Rowe Professorship in Virology at the Morgridge Institute and the Wisconsin Alumni Research Foundation, and the Curator of Evolutionary Biology at the Field Museum. The trust also co-founded the Rowe-Clark Math and Science Academy in Chicago's West Humboldt Park neighborhood, with the family donating $4 million to the school as of 2011. The Rowes were patrons of Pope John Paul II Catholoc School on Chicago's southwest side and co-founded the Rowe Elementary School. In 2010, the American Academy of Arts and Sciences was congressionally mandated to convene The Commission on the Humanities and Social Sciences, it appointed Rowe co-chair. The Commission released its report, ''The Heart of the Matter'', in June 2013.

== Personal life ==
Rowe was married to Jeanne until his death. Together, they had one child, William. They lived in Naples, Florida, and in Chicago.

Rowe died at his home in Naples on September 24, 2022.

== Awards and recognition ==
- Institutional Investor's Best CEOs in America (2008, 2009)
- Fellow of the American Academy of Arts and Sciences (2009)
- The Edison Electric Institute Distinguished Leadership Award (2009)
- The Chicago Council on Global Affairs Global Leadership Award (2009)
- The Chicagoland Chamber of Commerce's Daniel H. Burnham Award for Business and Civic Leadership (2008)
- Induction into the Junior Achievement's Chicago Business Hall of Fame (2008)
- Civic Federation of Chicago's Lyman Gage Award for Outstanding Civic Leadership (2008)
- The National Latino Education Institute Corporate Leadership Award (2008)
- Illinois Holocaust Museum's Humanitarian Award (2008)
- University of Arizona's Executive of the Year Award (2007)
- The Union League of Philadelphia's Founder's Award for Business Leadership (2005)
- The American Jewish Committee's Civic Leadership Award (2004)
- El Valor's Corporate Visionary Award (2003)
- The City Club of Chicago's Citizen of the Year Award (2002)
- The Anti-Defamation League's World of Difference Award (2000)

Rowe was awarded honorary doctorates from the University of Wisconsin, Illinois Institute of Technology, DePaul University, Drexel University, University of Massachusetts Dartmouth, Bryant College and Thomas College. He has also received Wisconsin's Distinguished Alumni Award in 2003.
