= Pepco Holdings =

Defunct American electric utility corporation

- Type: Subsidiary of Exelon
- Industry: Electric Utility
- Founded: February 9, 2001; 25 years ago
- Defunct: March 23, 2016
- Headquarters: Washington, D.C., U.S.
- Key people: David M. Velazquez, CEO, Chairman, & President
- Products: Electricity Distribution; Energy-Related Services
- Number of employees: 5,592
- Divisions: Atlantic City Electric; Delmarva Power; Pepco; Pepco Energy Services
- Website: pepcoholdings.com

Pepco Holdings, Inc (PHI) was a holding company for electric utilities in the Northeastern United States. It merged with Exelon in 2016.

It incorporated in February 2001 for the purpose of effecting the acquisition of Conectiv Power Delivery by Potomac Electric Power Company (better known as "Pepco"). The acquisition was completed on August 1, 2002, at which time Pepco and Conectiv became wholly owned subsidiaries of PHI. Conectiv itself had been formed in 1998 to be the holding company of Delmarva Power & Light Company (DPL, better known as "Delmarva Power") and Atlantic City Electric Company (ACE) in connection with the combination of DPL and ACE

In 2005, PHI resumed the use of the Delmarva Power and ACE brands for purposes of operations, with the result that Conectiv Energy was the only remaining Conectiv brand and was restricted for PHI's energy production facilities. Operations of the various companies controlled by Pepco Holdings take place in the Mid-Atlantic states of the United States. Pepco serves Washington, D.C., and its Maryland suburbs, Delmarva Power serves the Delaware and Maryland portions of the Delmarva Peninsula, and Atlantic City Electric serves South Jersey. In 2008, Delmarva Power sold its service area in the Virginia portion of the peninsula to A&N Electric Cooperative and Old Dominion Electric Cooperative for US$44 million. In April 2010, Conectiv Energy was sold to Calpine Corporation.

Pepco Holdings was placed at 283rd on the 2006 Fortune 500, a list of American companies ranked by gross revenue. In 2010, the company paid only 10% of the taxes it had paid in the previous year, dropping from $104 million to $11 million. The company experienced a doubling of operating profit in 2011, in part due to approved utility rate increases in the states of Delaware, Maryland, and New Jersey along with Washington, D.C.

== Merger with Exelon ==
Exelon announced the proposed purchase of Pepco Holdings, Inc on April 30, 2014. The merger was rejected by the District of Columbia Public Service Commission in August 2015, though it was approved by other federal and state regulators. On March 23, 2016, the merger with Exelon was approved by the District of Columbia Public Service Commission, under a revised set of terms. The merger was completed on that same day.

== Criticism ==
In December 2011, the non-partisan organization Public Campaign criticized Pepco Holdings for spending $3.76 million on lobbying and not paying any taxes during 2008–2010, instead getting $508 million in tax rebates, despite making a profit of $882 million and increasing executive pay by 118% to $9.7 million in 2010 for the top 5 executives.

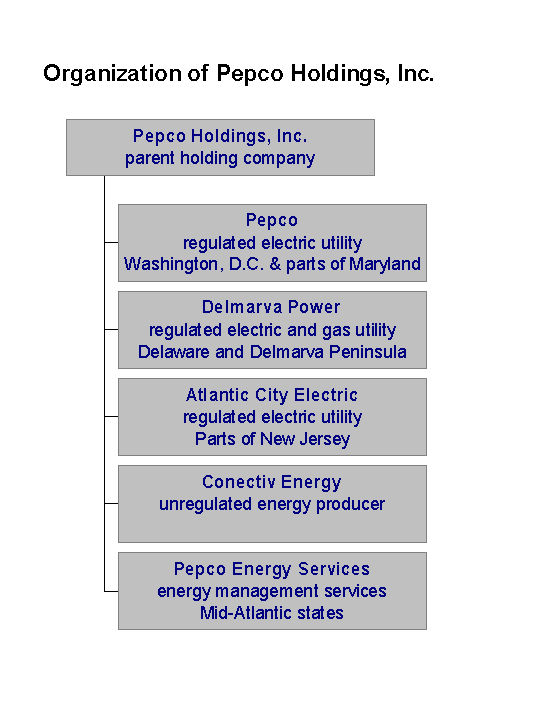

== Restatement ==
In 2006, Pepco Holdings restated its previously reported consolidated financial statements for the three and six months ended June 30, 2005, to correct the accounting for certain deferred compensation arrangements.
