= Unicom =

Unicom may refer to:

- UNICOM, or Universal Communications, air-ground communication facility
- Unicom Corp, a defunct energy holding company in the United States
- China Unicom, telecommunication operator in China
- UNICOM Global, US-based IT company
