= Delmarva Power =

Energy company

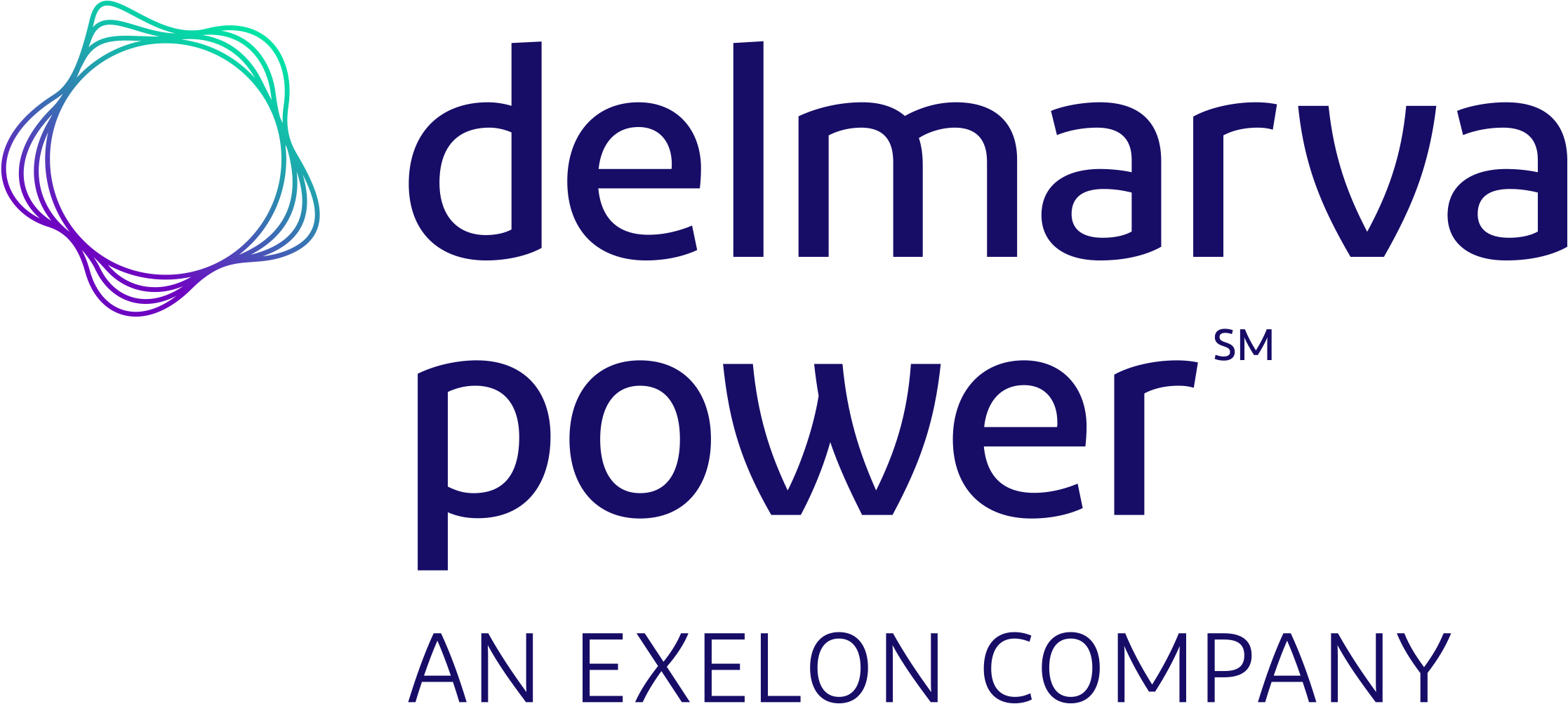
- Type: Subsidiary
- Industry: Energy
- Founded: 1909; 117 years ago
- Headquarters: Newark, Delaware, United States
- Key people: David M. Velazquez (president and CEO); J. Tyler Anthony (SVP and COO); Donna J. Kinzel (SVP and CFO); Paul R. Bonney (SVP); Gary R. Stockbridge (Delmarva Power Region president)
- Number of employees: 961
- Parent: Exelon
- Website: delmarva.com

Delmarva Power is an energy company that provides electricity and natural gas to customers on portions of the Delmarva Peninsula in the states of Delaware and Maryland. The company is a subsidiary of Exelon.

== Electricity and natural gas ==
Delmarva Power has a 5,000-square-mile (13,000 km^{2}) service area located on the Delmarva Peninsula, serving much of the state of Delaware and the Eastern Shore region of Maryland. The company provides electricity to 312,000 customers in Delaware and 203,000 customers in Maryland as well as natural gas to 129,000 customers in northern Delaware. Delmarva Power has 961 employees and operates 10 facilities and 160 substations.

Transmission voltages are 500kV, 230kV, 138kV and 69kV. The company is a member of the PJM Interconnection.

== History ==
The company was founded in 1909 as Delaware Power & Light, which served Delaware. In 1943, Delaware Power & Light acquired Eastern Shore Public Service Company, which served the Eastern Shore region of Maryland and the Eastern Shore region of Virginia. The name of the company was changed to Delmarva Power & Light in 1966 and Delmarva Power in 1972. In 1994, Delmarva Power announced it would acquire the Conowingo Power Company, the Maryland retail electric subsidiary of PECO Energy Company that served 35,000 customers in portions of Cecil and Harford counties, for $150 million. This acquisition was completed on June 19, 1995.

In 1998, Delmarva Power acquired Atlantic Energy, which owned Atlantic City Electric in New Jersey, for $968 million. The merged utility company became known as Conectiv Power Delivery. Conectiv Power Delivery was acquired by the Potomac Electric Power Company in 2002 for $5.4 billion, which resulted in Pepco Holdings being created as a holding company that owned both utility companies. In 2005, Pepco Holdings brought back the Delmarva Power and Atlantic City Electric names in place of Conectiv Power Delivery.

Between 1981 and 2006, Delmarva Power operated and maintained the municipally owned St. Michaels Electric Utility, which served 4,000 customers in the town of St. Michaels, Maryland, and surrounding areas, under a lease agreement. On October 15, 2006, the St. Michaels Electric Utility was acquired by Choptank Electric Cooperative for $12.2 million, ending Delmarva Power's lease of the system. In 2008, Delmarva Power sold its service area in the Virginia portion of the Delmarva Peninsula, which consisted of 22,000 customers, to A&N Electric Cooperative and Old Dominion Electric Cooperative for $44 million.

On April 30, 2014, Exelon announced that it would acquire Pepco Holdings, the parent company of Delmarva Power. The merger was initially rejected by the District of Columbia Public Service Commission in August 2015, although other federal and state regulators approved of the merger. After revised terms, the District of Columbia Public Service Commission approved the merger on March 23, 2016, and the $6.8 billion acquisition of Pepco Holdings by Exelon was completed the same day. As a result, Exelon serves as the parent company of Delmarva Power.

In 2018, after Congress reduced corporate tax rates from 35% to 21%, Delmarva Power announced that they were reducing their annual power rate increase request for their territory in the state of Delaware by $26 million. Delaware state regulators requested public utility companies to calculate savings "to ensure that consumers will receive the benefits".

== Community ==
Since 2012, Delmarva Power had donated over $4.7 million to more than 750 organizations. Delmarva Power supports of educational, environmental, arts and culture, and community development organizations. Delmarva Power’s employees give thousands of hours in time and talent as board members, coaches, and volunteers to support community nonprofit organizations.

== See also ==
- Delmarva Power & Light Building
