= The Commission on the Humanities and Social Sciences =

The Commission on the Humanities and Social Sciences was convened in 2010 by the American Academy of Arts and Sciences at the request of Senators Lamar Alexander (R-Tennessee) and Mark Warner (D-Virginia) and Representatives Tom Petri (R-Wisconsin) and David Price (D-North Carolina).

On June 19, 2013, the Commission issued its initial report The Heart of the Matter, along with a companion film created by brothers Christopher and Erik Ewers, both long-time Ken Burns collaborators. The short film features interviews with Burns, George Lucas, Sandra Day O'Connor, John Lithgow, and Yo-Yo Ma.

The commission was chaired by Richard H. Brodhead, president of Duke University, and John W. Rowe, retired chairman and chief executive officer of Exelon Corporation. Other Commission members included university, college, and community college presidents, museum directors, public servants, corporate executives, humanists, social scientists, and artists.

The Commission’s report received wide press coverage and statements of support from 15 national and state organizations.
