= ANEC =

ANEC may refer to:

- A&N Electric Cooperative, Utility cooperative serving the Eastern Shore of Virginia and Smith Island, Maryland
- Air Navigation and Engineering Company, British aircraft manufacturer in 1919
- The European consumer voice in standardisation, representing the collective European consumer interest in (technical) standards
