= Choptank Electric Cooperative =

US not-for-profit energy organization

- Company type: Cooperative
- Industry: Electric Utility
- Founded: 1938
- Headquarters: Denton, Maryland, USA
- Key people: Micheal E. Malandro (President and CEO)
- Products: Electricity
- Number of employees: 160
- Website: http://www.choptankelectric.coop

Choptank Electric Cooperative is a nonprofit utility cooperative that distributes electricity to rural areas in the Eastern Shore region of the state of Maryland. The cooperative, which was founded in 1938, is headquartered in Denton.

== Electricity ==
Choptank Electric Cooperative is owned by its members, who each have one vote in deciding which co-op members will serve on the board of directors. They serve more than 52,000 members in Caroline, Cecil, Dorchester, Kent, Queen Anne's, Somerset, Talbot, Wicomico, and Worcester counties on Maryland's Eastern Shore. This 70 by 140 mile territory contains almost 6,200 miles of distribution lines. In 2001, they were ranked the 11th largest energy company in the state of Maryland. Choptank Electric Cooperative is a Touchstone Energy Cooperative and a member of Old Dominion Electric Cooperative, a generation and transmission cooperative serving 11 member distribution cooperatives in Delaware, Maryland, and Virginia.

== History ==
Choptank Cooperative, Inc. was formed on September 21, 1938, after the Rural Electrification Act was passed. Its first electric distribution lines were energized on December 15, 1939, in Caroline County. The cooperative was instrumental in the effort to provide electric power to the rural areas of Maryland's Eastern Shore. In 1942, the name was changed to Choptank Electric Cooperative. The cooperative joined Old Dominion Electric Cooperative in 1976 to get lower costs for wholesale electricity.

On October 15, 2006, Choptank Electric Cooperative acquired the municipally owned St. Michaels Electric Utility, which served 4,000 customers in the town of St. Michaels and surrounding areas, for $12.2 million. The St. Michaels Electric Utility had been operated and maintained by Delmarva Power under a lease agreement from 1981 to 2006. On September 19, 2006, residents of Berlin voted in favor of selling the Berlin Electric Utility Department to Choptank Electric Cooperative, a move supported by the mayor and town council because of the utility's debt and high rates but opposed by the Berlin Utility Commission because of the feared loss of revenue. Under this arrangement, Choptank Electric Cooperative would have taken over the distribution system while Old Dominion Electric Cooperative would have taken over the town's power plant. The sale fell through in 2007 after Old Dominion Electric Cooperative backed out of the deal because it felt the town's power plant did not meet the environmental standard for a residential area; Choptank Electric Cooperative soon backed out too.
