= Radioactive: The Women of Three Mile Island =

- Genre: Documentary
- Written by: Heidi Hutner
- Directed by: Heidi Hutner
- Composer: Dash Hammerstein
- Country of origin: United States
- Original language: English

Production
- Executive producers: Richard Saperstein; Christopher Hormel; Barbara Ford
- Producers: Simeon Hutner; Heidi Hutner
- Production locations: Three Mile Island, Pennsylvania, US
- Cinematography: Martijn Hart
- Editor: Simeon Hutner
- Running time: 76 minutes
- Production company

Original release
- Release: 2023

Radioactive: The Women of Three Mile Island is 2023 Documentary film about the 1979 Three Mile Island accident and its aftermath. The film is based on the stories of four women who take their community's case against the plant operator to the Supreme Court. The documentary is directed and co-written by Heidi Hutner and features a cast including Jane Fonda, Joanne Doroshow, Joyce Corradi, Beth Drazba, Paula Kinney, and Linda Braasch. It received the Audience Pick Best Documentary award at the Dances With Films Festival, NYC; Best Director and Best Documentary at the First Frame International Film Festival, NYC; and Best Investigative Documentary at the International Uranium Film Festival.

== Release ==
Radioactive: The Women of Three Mile Island released in theaters on December 7, 2023 and on streaming services on March 22, 2024. It is available on Apple+ on March 12, 2024.

== Reception ==
Radioactive: The Women of Three Mile Island has been praised for its impactful message. CounterPunch praised the film and concluded, "A great woman filmmaker is born. " while Film Threat "encouraged every American to watch this wonderful and engrossing documentary. Radioactive: The Women of Three Mile Island is a powerful piece, and its story needs to be told." Another review, although conceding that "From a strictly cinematographic point of view, Radioactive: The Women of Three Mile Island is a fairly conventional documentary. It boasts no whizbang special effects or interactive experiences, just the tried-and-true formula of archival footage woven with original, cinema-verité camerawork.", concluded "This is a film that should be rated in supernovas, not stars."

== Awards ==
Award	Festival	Result
Audience Pick Best Documentary	Dances With Films Festival	Won
Best Director and Best Documentary	First Frame International Film Festival, NYC	Won
Best Investigative Documentary	International Uranium Film Festival	Won
