= Pepco =

American energy company

Potomac Electric Power Company
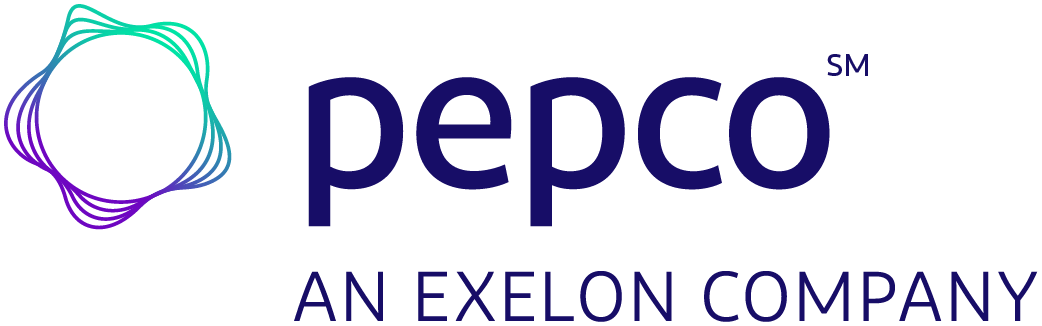

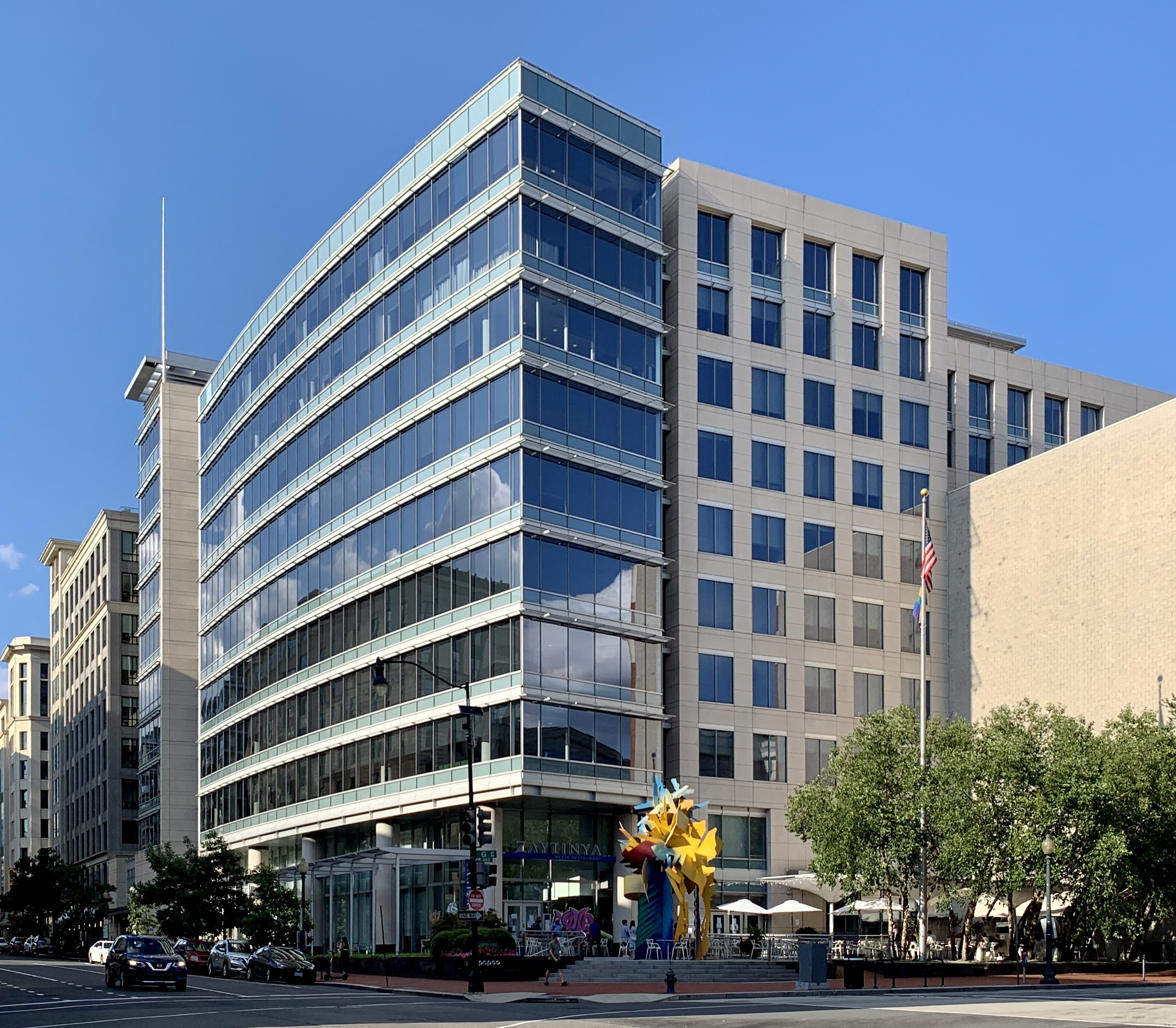
- PEPCO headquarters in Washington, D.C., in 2020
- Trade name: Pepco
- Type: Subsidiary
- Industry: Utilities
- Founded: April 28, 1896; 130 years ago (as Potomac Electric Power Company)
- Founder: Oscar T. Crosby
- Headquarters: United States
- Area served: Washington metropolitan area
- Products: Electric power
- Number of employees: 1,429
- Parent: Exelon
- ASN: 17347
- Website: pepco.com

The Potomac Electric Power Company (PEPCO) is an American utility company that supplies electric power to the city of Washington, D.C., and to surrounding communities in Maryland. It is owned by Exelon.

The company's current trademarked slogan is "Your life. Plugged in." Its former slogan was "We're connected to you by more than power lines." In the 1930s, it promoted itself by claiming the offered "matchless service". This was an attempt at a pun, as since Pepco provided gas home services, there was no need for a match to light anything.

Pepco's bulk transmission system consists of transmission lines operating at 115 kV, 138kV, 230 kV and 500 kV. Pepco has interconnections with Potomac Edison (230kV, 500kV), Baltimore Gas and Electric (500kV, 230kV, 115kV), and Dominion Virginia Power (500kV, 230kV).

== History ==
The company's predecessor, Potomac Electric Co., was organized in 1891 to provide street lighting and streetcar power in Georgetown and Northwest D.C. After suffering during the Panic of 1893, the company filed bankruptcy and, on November 6, 1895, was acquired by Oscar T. Crosby and Charles A. Lieb for $5,500.

The company was incorporated as Potomac Electric Power Company on April 28, 1896 in Virginia. It became a subsidiary of the North American Company, which owned the Washington Traction and Electric Company, one of the private streetcar companies in Washington.

On December 17, 1896, after a court battle, the company received a contract to light the city of Washington, D.C.

In January 1889, the company merged with its rival, United States Electric Lighting Company.

In 1899, the company merged with Washington Traction and Electric Company.

In June 1901, the company filed for bankruptcy and was acquired by the Washington Railway and Electric Company.

In 1905, revenues exceeded $1 million for the first time.

In 1906, the company began construction of the first unit of the Benning Road Power Plant, along the Anacostia River. When its last unit was completed in 1931, the power plant had a 185,000-kilowatt capacity.

In 1928, the North American Company, a holding company that owned many public utilities, gained control of Washington Railway and Electric.

The Public Utility Holding Company Act was enacted in 1935 to force the breakup of large utility holding companies. Under this law, the Securities and Exchange Commission in 1942 ordered the North American Company and its subsidiaries to split up. A years-long legal battle ensued, culminating in a Supreme Court decision upholding the order. As a result, Pepco's stock was distributed to Washington Railway's shareholders in December 1947, making Pepco an independent, publicly traded company.

In 1954, revenue exceeded $50 million for the first time.

In 1969, the company suspended its dividend due to rising costs.

In 1980, the company cancelled plans to build a $930 million power plant in Montgomery County as a result of reduced demand.

In September 1995, the company announced a merger with Baltimore Gas & Electric; however, the merger was cancelled in December 1997.

In 2001, Pepco agreed to acquire Conectiv Power Delivery, the parent company of Delmarva Power and Atlantic City Electric, for $2.2 billion. The purchase was completed in 2002, with Pepco and Conectiv becoming subsidiaries of a newly formed holding company, Pepco Holdings. In 2003, Pepco's investment subsidiary, Potomac Capital Investment, was transferred to Pepco Holdings.

In 2014, Pepco Holdings agreed to be acquired by Exelon for $6.8 billion. The deal faced opposition from Pepco customers and from officials in Washington and Maryland, but was ultimately approved. The acquisition was completed on March 23, 2016, making Pepco a subsidiary of Exelon.

== Controversies ==
=== Poor reliability and outages ===
An investigation by The Washington Post in 2010 faulted Pepco for poor reliability. The report noted that the company's performance had slipped since 2005, comparing poorly to other major utilities in the frequency and duration of power outages. Thousands of people lost power for as many as five days after only 5–8 inches of heavy wet snow. In 2011, Business Insider named the company first on its list of "The 19 Most Hated Companies In America" based on its American Customer Satisfaction Index rating.

During the June 2012 North American derecho, more than half of the customers in Montgomery County, Maryland lost electric power. The company was criticized for being slow to restore power and for charging its customers for the power outage.

=== Pollution ===
==== Potomac River Mineral Oil Spill - January 25, 2011 ====
The Coast Guard, along with local agencies, are responding to a mineral oil spill in the Potomac River near Alexandria, Va. on Monday, January 24. Pepco employees notified the Coast Guard Sunday at 12:40 p.m., reporting approximately 5,000 gallons of mineral oil was believed to have leaked from a transformer at the Pepco substation in Alexandria. It was also reported, that an additional 500 gallons had leaked into the Potomac River. Coast Guard Sector Baltimore's Incident Management Division personnel arrived on scene at approximately 2 p.m. Sunday and conducted a shoreline assessment of the area. Triumvirate Environmental and Clean Harbors have been hired by Pepco to contain and dispose of the oil. The oil that reached the waterway has been contained by boom. The cause of the spill is under investigation. USCG Sector Baltimore contacted NOAA SSC early evening on Tuesday, Jan. 25. USCG reported that mineral oil was not dispersing and requested information from NOAA about toxicity concerns if any, and rate of dispersion. Chris Barker, Robert Jones, and Gary Shigenaka provided support.

==== Other Air & Water Pollution ====
The company's Benning Road Power Plant produced air pollution that negatively affected neighboring communities. In 2017, the company agreed to pay regulators $1.6 million for violations of the Clean Water Act. In October 2023, Pepco agreed to pay $47 million in costs and $10 million in penalties to D.C. for decades of discharging toxic chemicals in the city, affecting the Anacostia River and other areas.

=== Alleged fraud ===
In March 2022, the D.C. Office of the Attorney General and the Office of the People's Counsel alleged Pepco was committing a "pattern of systemic violations" in carrying out community solar panel installations. According to the complaint, Pepco has botched its handling of community solar projects in numerous ways. The utility is undercounting solar energy generation at community solar projects, according to the filing, and is "systematically failing" to provide accurate and timely solar credits to customers.
