= Benning Road Power Plant =

Former power station in Washington, DC

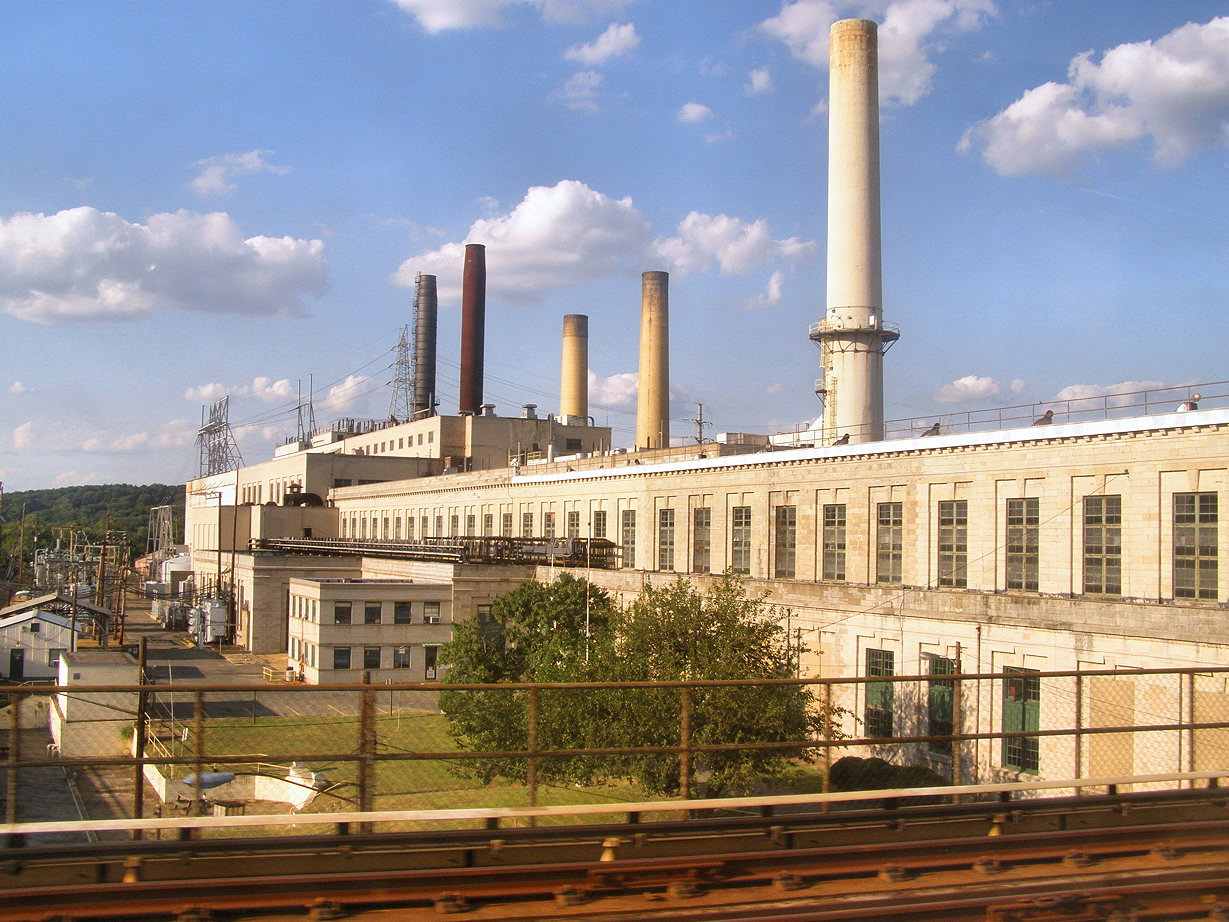
- The Benning Road Power Plant before its demolition
- Country: United States of America
- Location: Washington, D.C.
- Coordinates: 38.899°N 76.957°W
- Status: Decommissioned
- Commission date: 1906
- Decommission date: 2012
- Owner: PEPCO
- Operator: PEPCO

Thermal power station
- Primary fuel: Coal

Power generation
- Nameplate capacity: 550 MW

The Benning Road Power Plant was a power plant owned by PEPCO and located in Washington, D.C. The 19-acre facility was built in 1906, and underwent several changes before being demolished in 2012. The facility was powered by coal until 1976, when it was converted to petroleum. By the early 2000s, the facility was capable of producing 550 megawatts of electricity and operated for an average of 10–15 days per year.

== Environmental impact ==
The plant's location in a largely African American and low-income portion of Northeast, Washington, D.C. raised environmental justice concerns for decades. The Plant produced air pollution that negatively affected neighboring communities. The facility also contributed to water pollution in the neighboring Anacostia River, releasing PCBs, lead, iron, cadmium, zinc, and other hazardous materials into the waterway. In 2011, PEPCO entered into a consent decree with the government of Washington DC due to the company's years of releases of PCBs into the river. In 2017, PEPCO agreed to pay regulators $1.6 million for violations of the Clean Water Act.

== Redevelopment ==
In 2014, the plant was stripped of hazardous materials and then demolished, leaving a 19-acre undeveloped riverfront site in a dense urban area. The facility was extremely close to the Minnesota Avenue station. There have been calls for the site to be converted into a use that is beneficial to the community.
