= Delaware Electric Cooperative =

Not-for-profit electrical utility company based in Greenwood, Delaware, USA

- Type: Cooperative
- Founded: 1936
- Headquarters: 14198 Sussex Hwy, Greenwood, DE 19950, United States
- Area served: Kent and Sussex Counties (Delaware)
- Key people: Rob Book (President and CEO)
- Revenue: 226,822,126 United States dollar (2022)
- Total assets: 429,246,863 United States dollar (2022)
- Members: 112,000
- Number of employees: 172
- Website: https://www.delaware.coop/

Delaware Electric Cooperative (DEC) is a not-for-profit electric utility based in Greenwood, Delaware, United States. Delaware Electric Cooperative is a member-owned electric utility providing power to over 300,000 people in Kent and Sussex Counties. DEC is a Touchstone Energy Cooperative and a member of Old Dominion Electric Cooperative, an electric generation and transmission cooperative.

== History ==
DEC was formed in 1936 by a group of farmers in southern Delaware. The major utilities at the time wouldn’t invest the capital to expand the electrical infrastructure to rural areas, so farmers formed a not-for-profit utility and financed rural electrification themselves. DEC has changed a lot since the 1930s, but they are still member-owned.

Unlike investor-owned utilities, being “member-owned” is at the heart of what cooperatives – utility or otherwise – are all about. In the case of Delaware Electric, when a member signs up for new service, they become part-owners of the Co-op, alongside every other member on their lines. When they pay their electric bills each month, they are investing in the continued development, growth and maintenance of the equipment and technology used to power their communities. Eventually, this money members put into the Co-op will be returned to them in the form of capital credits. Members also have the power to elect representatives to DEC’s board of directors, ensuring that their voices and interests are heard at the highest levels. In short, any profits or margins the Co-op posts are returned to those it serves, and every decision that’s made is in their best interest.

== Capital Credits ==
One of the benefits of being a Cooperative member is receiving returns on investments. Member-owners are entitled to margins, also known as the Co-op’s profits. These are called capital credits and are returned in the form of a check or a billing credit. Over the past ten years, DEC has returned $60 million to members.

== Beat the Peak ==
In 2008, former Co-op President and CEO Bill Andrew developed the nationally recognized Beat the Peak program, a system created to help DEC members know when to conserve electricity to help the utility keep energy prices low. During times when the cost to purchase and produce power for members is high, DEC issues Beat the Peak alerts. During these alert periods, members are asked to conserve energy. Ways to conserve might include turning off unnecessary lights, delaying the use of major appliances like dishwashers and dryers or turning the thermostat up a few degrees in the summer and down a few degrees in the winter, just to name a few.

Originally, the program utilized in-home indicators that members could plug in at their homes that would light up when a peak alert was issued. Today, with the advancement of technology, DEC issues peak alerts through its “Delaware Coop – Beat the Peak” app, which can be downloaded from the app store on a member’s mobile device. Not only does the app tell members when peak alerts are in effect, but it also displays the best ways to save energy during alert periods and will show members how much money the program is saving them.

Members can also “beat the peak” by enrolling in DEC’s “Beat the Peak with Thermostats” and “Beat the Peak with Electric Vehicles (EVs)” program. By enrolling in the “Beat the Peak with Thermostats” program, members with a Wi-Fi-enabled thermostat allow DEC to remotely adjust the temperature of their thermostat by a few degrees to conserve energy during peak alert times. Members participating in the program receive a monthly billing credit of $5 on electric bills during the summer months.

Similarly, members who sign up for the Co-op’s “Beat the Peak with EV’s” program can also help conserve energy! By not charging their EV’s during peak alert times, members can earn an initial $200 billing credit, as well as a $5 monthly billing credit during the summer months. To participate, members must have a Wi-Fi-enabled ChargePoint Home electric vehicle charger.

== Investments in Renewable Energy ==
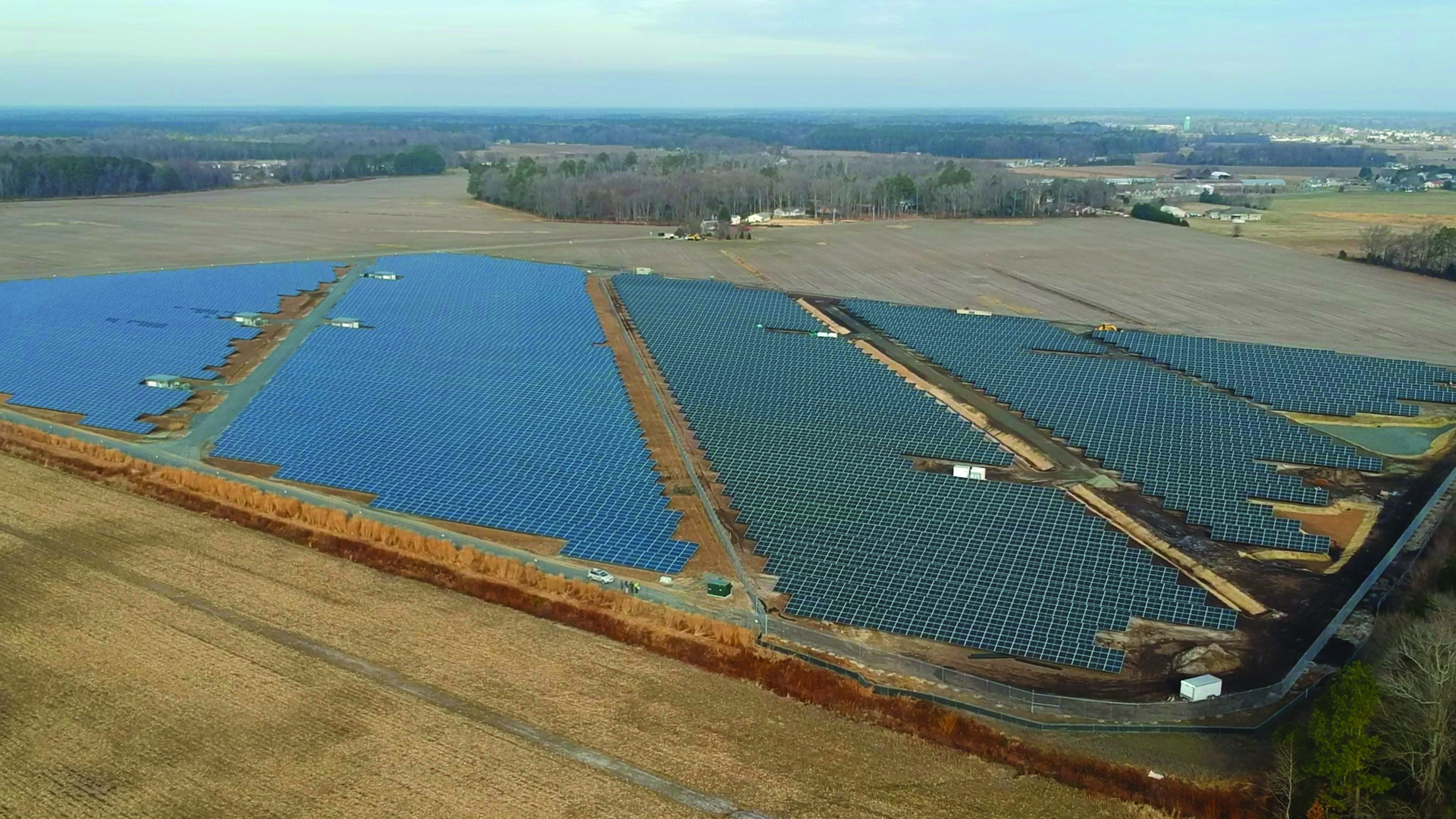
The nearly 40-acre Bruce A. Henry Solar Farm near Georgetown has been providing members with renewable energy since 2012.

Since 2012, DEC has balanced the need to decarbonize the energy it delivers to members with its goal of keeping electric costs affordable for members. The Co-op was the first utility in the state to build and own its own solar energy farm. The nearly 40-acre Bruce A. Henry Solar Farm near Georgetown has been providing members with renewable energy since 2012. In January 2022, the utility announced that seven new utility-scale solar projects would begin generating clean energy for members by 2024. The Co-op continues to rely on a diversified mix of energy sources, including solar, wind, landfill gas, coal, nuclear and natural gas to provide reliable power to more than 112,000 homes and businesses. Through investments in renewable energy and various efficiency programs, the co-op has reduced its carbon footprint by 46 percent since 2005.

== SmartHub App ==
By signing up for a DEC SmartHub account, members can access their DEC account information from the comfort of their home computer or while on-the-go from their mobile device. To sign up, members can click the “New User” link below the account login field on the DEC website’s home page. They will then be prompted to fill in the necessary information to complete their account. Members can also download the SmartHub app on their phone or smart device to view their account information or report an outage. To download, members must visit the app store on their mobile device and download the “DEC Connect” app. Then, they can login in with the credentials they chose when creating their account, or if they are a new user, they can create an account using the app.
