= Condensate polisher =

Device used to filter water condensed from steam

A condensate polisher is a device used to filter water condensed from steam as part of the steam cycle, for example in a conventional or nuclear power plant (powdered resin or deep bed system). It is frequently filled with tiny polymer resin beads which are used to remove or exchange ions so that the purity of the condensate is maintained at or near that of distilled water.

== Description ==
Condensate polishers are important in systems using the boiling and condensing of water to transport or transform thermal energy. Using technology similar to a water softener, trace amounts of minerals or other contamination are removed from the system before such contamination becomes concentrated enough to cause problems by depositing minerals inside pipes, or within precision-engineered devices such as boilers, steam generators, heat exchangers, steam turbines, cooling towers, and condensers. The removal of minerals has the secondary effect of maintaining the pH balance of the water at or near neutral (a pH of 7.0) by removing ions that would tend to make the water more acidic. This reduces the rate of corrosion from water against metal.

Condensate polishing typically involves ion exchange technology for the removal of trace dissolved minerals and suspended matter. Commonly used as part of a power plant's condensate system, it prevents premature chemical failure and deposition within the power cycle which would have resulted in loss of unit efficiency and possible mechanical damage to key generating equipment.

During the process of steam generation in power plants, the steam cools and condensate forms. The condensate is collected and then recycled as boiler feedwater. Prior to re-use, the condensate must be purified or "polished", to remove impurities (predominantly silicon oxides and sodium hydroxide) which have the potential to cause damage to the boilers, steam generators, reactors and turbines. Both dissolved (i.e. silica) and suspended matter (ex. iron oxide particles from corrosion, also called 'crud'), as well as other contaminants which can cause corrosion and maintenance issues are effectively removed by condensate polishing treatment.
