= Unicom Corp =

Former American energy company

- Company type: Public
- Traded as: NYSE: UCM
- Industry: Energy
- Founded: 1994; 32 years ago
- Defunct: October 23, 2000
- Fate: Acquired by merger
- Successor: Exelon
- Headquarters: United States
- Area served: United States
- Key people: James J. O'Connor (CEO and chairman 1994-1998); John W. Rowe (CEO, chairman and president 1998-2000)

Unicom Corporation was an American energy holding company formed in 1994 from Commonwealth Edison after executives considered a corporate image makeover. The holding company merged with PECO Energy Company on October 23, 2000 to form Exelon.

== History ==
Unicom Corporation was formed in 1994 after energy company Commonwealth Edison executives focused on a corporate image makeover. Unicom's primary subsidiary, Commonwealth Edison, focused on the production, purchase, transmission, distribution, and sale of electricity to residential, commercial, industrial, and wholesale customers. James J. O'Connor was CEO and chairman of the company from 1994 to 1998.

In 1997, after pending compromise to deregulate the electric utility industry, Unicom announced its intention to reenter the natural gas industry, an industry it left in 1954 following the spin off of Northern Illinois Gas Company. O'Connor stepped down as CEO in 1998 due to under-performance and was replaced by John W. Rowe who assumed the position of CEO, chairman and president of the company.

In September 1999, Unicom announced a planned $16 billion merger with PECO Energy Company. The merger was completed on October 23, 2000 and formed Exelon Corporation. The merger was one of the largest at the time. After the merger, Exelon maintained the largest collection of nuclear plants in the United States and became among the nation's largest electric utilities company, generating more than $12 billion in annual revenues.
