= A&N Electric Cooperative =

American utility cooperative serving Virginia and Maryland

- Type: Cooperative
- Founded: 1940
- Headquarters: Tasley, Virginia, United States
- Key people: Butch Williamson (President and CEO); Penny M. Fowler (CFO and CAO)
- Website: http://www.anec.com/

A&N Electric Cooperative (ANEC) is a utility cooperative that distributes electricity to Accomack and Northampton counties in the state of Virginia along with Smith Island in Maryland, in the southern portion of the Delmarva Peninsula. The cooperative, which was founded in 1940, is headquartered in Tasley, Virginia.

The cooperative serves a total of 33,000 members. It is a Touchstone Energy Cooperative and a member of Old Dominion Electric Cooperative (ODEC), an electric generation and transmission cooperative. As an electric cooperative, ANEC is owned by the members who it provides electricity to.

== History ==
ANEC was founded in 1940 as a nonprofit, member-owned electric cooperative. In 2008, Delmarva Power sold its service area in the Virginia portion of the Delmarva Peninsula, which consisted of 22,000 customers, to ANEC and ODEC for $44 million.
