= Old Dominion Electric Cooperative =

Utility company based in Virginia, United States

- Company type: Cooperative Federation
- Founded: 1948
- Headquarters: Glen Allen, Virginia, United States
- Area served: Virginia, Maryland, & Delaware
- Key people: Chris Cosby, President & CEO
- Revenue: Not-for-profit
- Members: 11
- Number of employees: 51-200
- Website: odec.com

Old Dominion Electric Cooperative (ODEC) is an electric generation and transmission cooperative headquartered in Glen Allen, Virginia. ODEC provides reliable, affordable, and responsible wholesale power to its 11 member-owned electric cooperatives in the states of Virginia, Maryland, and Delaware in the United States. Together, these cooperatives serve nearly 1.5 million people throughout the mid-Atlantic region. ODEC generates its electricity from coal, fuel oil, natural gas, nuclear energy, solar, and wind, along with investments in innovative programs such as demand response and energy efficiency.

On February 1, 2025, Chris Cosby became the organization's president and CEO. Before assuming his current role within the organization, Cosby served as ODEC's Chief Operating Officer.

== About ==
ODEC is an electric generation and transmission cooperative that provides reliable, affordable, and responsible wholesale power to its 11 member electric cooperatives in Virginia, Maryland, and Delaware. Through these member cooperatives, ODEC provides over 11 million megawatt hours of power to 1.5 million people. ODEC's member cooperatives primarily distribute power to rural, suburban, and recreation areas.

ODEC's generation facilities use coal, fuel oil, natural gas, nuclear energy, solar, and wind, along with investments in programs such as demand response and energy efficiency. Maintaining a mix of fuels to provide a flow of electricity is critical to achieving our mission of delivering reliable electricity to our member cooperatives. Whether through direct ownership or co-ownership, ODEC operates five power generation facilities in Virginia and Maryland, incorporating both baseload fuel sources and natural gas facilities to help fill the needs of our member-owners during periods of peak demand.

Northern Virginia Electric Cooperative was a member of the cooperative until 31 December 2008, when it terminated its contract.

TEC Trading is a Class B member of Old Dominion and is owned by ODEC's member cooperatives. TEC purchases excess power from Old Dominion and sells it on the market.

== Members ==
- A&N Electric Cooperative
- BARC Electric Cooperative
- Choptank Electric Cooperative
- Community Electric Cooperative
- Delaware Electric Cooperative
- Mecklenburg Electric Cooperative
- Northern Neck Electric Cooperative
- Prince George Electric Cooperative
- Rappahannock Electric Cooperative
- Shenandoah Valley Electric Cooperative
- Southside Electric Cooperative

== Further reading and recent news ==
"Surry Board of Supervisor approves controversial coal plant" Daily Press, Feb. 5, 2010

"Surry power plant now faces last local hurdle" Daily Press, Feb. 2, 2010

"Facing objections, company eyes second power plant site" The Virginian-Pilot, Jan. 31, 2010

"Consider power plant from regional perspective" Tidewater News, Jan. 30, 2010

"IOW wants more information on proposed coal plant" Tidewater News, Jan. 23, 2010

"Surry Coal Plant Pros and Cons" Richmond Times Dispatch, May 17, 2009

"Proposed coal plant clears another hurdle" Daily Press, Dec. 16, 2009

"Virginia's Energy Future-Energy on land" HearSay with Cathy Lewis, WHRV FM, Feb. 26, 2010
