= PECO Energy Company =

Energy company

PECO Energy
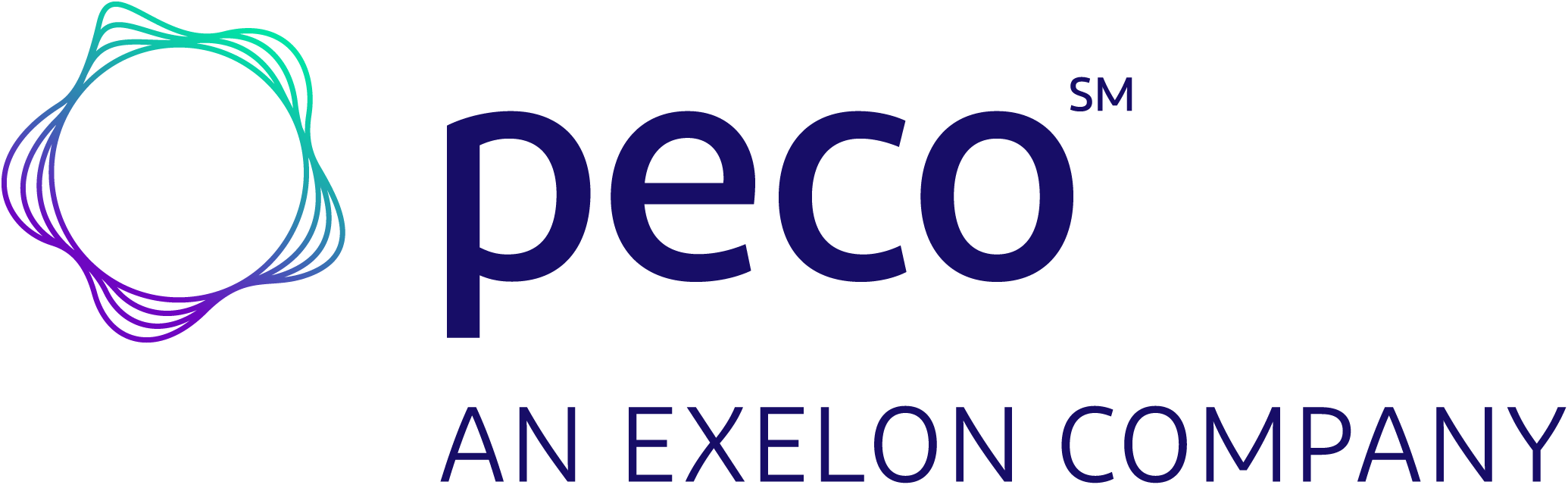

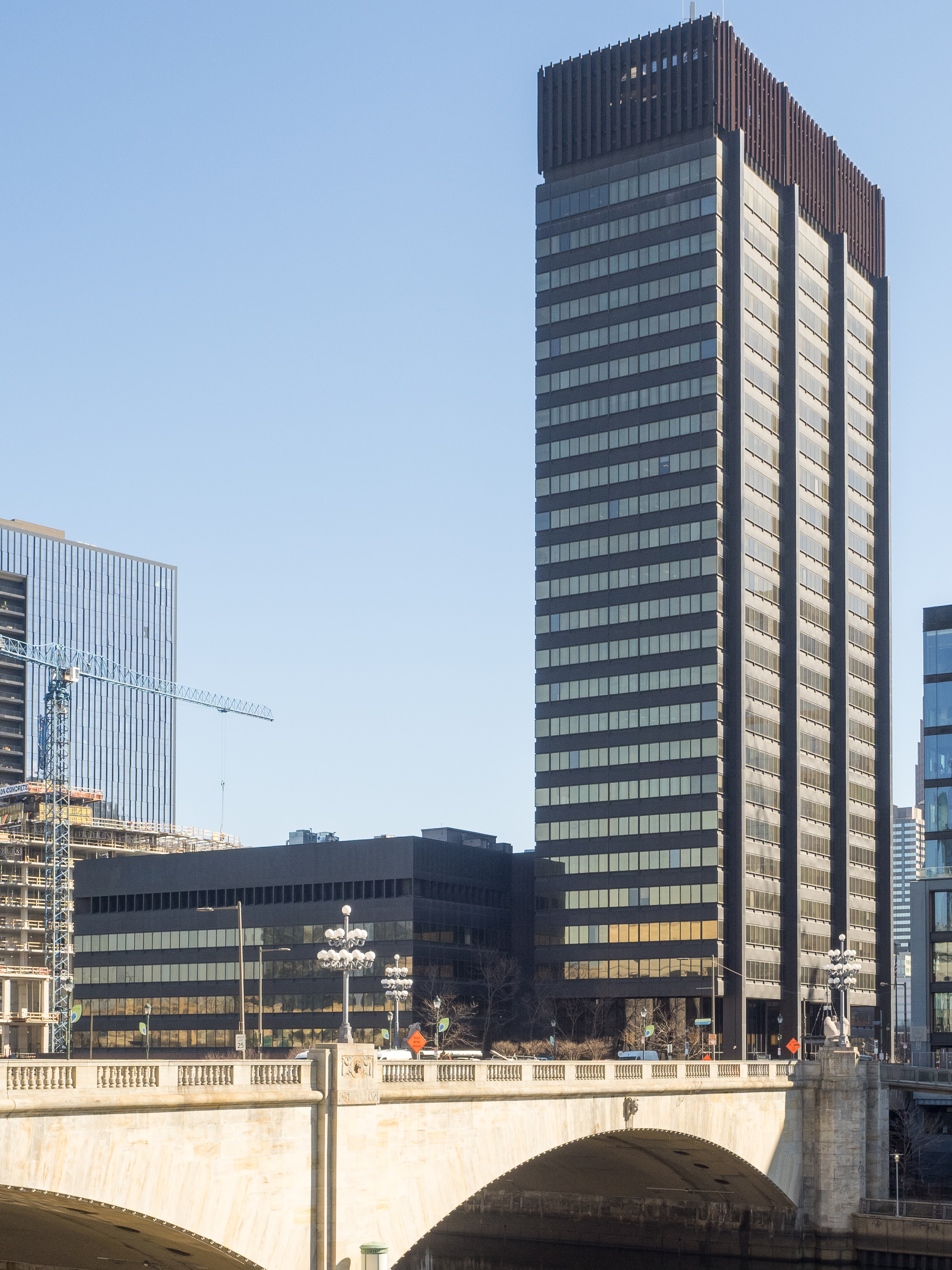
- PECO headquarters in Philadelphia
- Type: Subsidiary
- Founded: 1881; 145 years ago
- Headquarters: PECO Building; Philadelphia, Pennsylvania, U.S.
- Parent: Exelon
- Website: peco.com

PECO, formerly the Philadelphia Electric Company, is an energy company founded in 1881 and incorporated in 1929. It became part of Exelon Corporation in 2000 when it merged with Commonwealth Edison's holding company Unicom Corp.

The company has approximately 2,300 employees; its call center and field craft personnel are members of IBEW Local 614. PECO serves about 1.6 million electric and over 511,000 natural gas customers; it is the largest combination utility in Pennsylvania, and has a franchise utility service area of 2,100 square miles (5,400 km^{2}) with a population of 3.8 million people.

== Electricity and natural gas ==
PECO operates in southeastern Pennsylvania and provides electricity to about 1.6 million customers and natural gas to over 511,000 customers. The company's electric service area covers all of the city of Philadelphia and Delaware County; most of Bucks, Chester, and Montgomery counties; and the southeastern corner of York County. The company's natural gas service area covers all of Delaware County; most of Bucks, Chester, and Montgomery counties; and a small portion of eastern Lancaster County.

PECO formerly provided electricity to 35,000 customers in portions of Cecil and Harford counties in Maryland through subsidiary Conowingo Power Company. On June 19, 1995, Delmarva Power acquired the Conowingo Power Company service area from PECO.

PECO's distribution line voltages are 2,400/4,160 volts wye and 7,620/13,200 volts wye. Subtransmission voltages are 34,500 volts and 69,000 volts. Transmission line voltages are 138,000 volts, 230,000 volts and 500,000 volts. The company is a member of the PJM Interconnection.

As of 2012 PECO's peak electric load occurred on July 22, 2011 and was 8,983 megawatts (MWs) and its highest peak load in the winter season occurred on December 20, 2004 and was 6,838 MW. Residential electric usage makes up about 35 percent of PECO's total electric delivery and half of the annual electric revenue.

PECO's electric sales tend to peak in the summer and winter seasons, driven by air conditioning and heating load respectively when extreme temperatures create greater demand. The company's natural gas sales are generally higher during the winter periods when cold temperatures create demand for heating. The company's highest gas sales occurred on January 17, 2000 and was 718 million cubic feet (20.3 million cubic metres) of gas. Gas usage by residential customers is approximately half of PECO's total deliveries.

The PECO transition period for the competitive electric generation market ended on December 31, 2010, when caps on retail rates and competitive transition charges on customer bills ended. PECO electric rates had been capped for 12 years. Since 2011, PECO has purchased its wholesale electricity from competitive market sources, with retail customers charged the actual costs of procurement.

Historically, according to Exelon's SEC Form 10-K for the year 2012, PECO's power supply consisted of 53% nuclear energy, 12% fossils and renewables, and 35% purchased power.

== Facilities and infrastructure ==
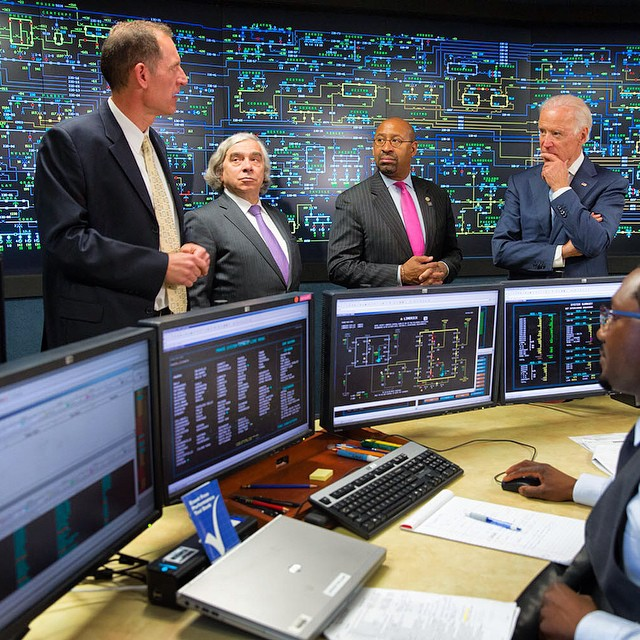
Secretary of Energy Ernest Moniz, Mayor Michael Nutter, and Vice President Joe Biden visiting PECO's headquarters in 2015

PECO owns, maintains, and operates:

- 1,067 miles (1,720 km) of higher-voltage transmission lines
- 15,260 square miles (39,500 km^{2}) of underground electrical distribution cable
- 12,933 miles (20,810 km) of aerial electrical distribution lines
- 12,157 miles (19,560 km) of natural gas transmission, distribution and service piplines.

PECO has a liquefied natural gas storage facility in West Conshohocken, PA. with capacity of 1,200,000,000 cubic feet (34,000,000 m^{3}) and a propane-air plant in Chester, PA. with storage capacity of 1,980,000 US gallons (7,500 m^{3}). The company also owns 29 natural gas city gate stations at locations that link with various interstate pipelines.

The Chester Waterside Station of the Philadelphia Electric Company was constructed in 1916 and listed on the National Register of Historic Places in 2007.

PECO supplies legacy two-phase electric power to sections of Philadelphia where infrastructure upgrades are impracticable. Philadelphia is one of only two cities with in-service two-phase infrastructure.

== Financials ==
As a fully regulated transmission and distribution utility, PECO operates as a subsidiary of the Exelon Corporation. PECO's utility business is capital intensive and requires ongoing investments in its electric and gas delivery systems to maintain infrastructure capacity and reliability for its customer base.

Historically, prior to the end of its rate caps in 2010, PECO reported $5.5 billion in revenue and total assets valued at $9.8 billion in 2008. Current financial and operational metrics for PECO are now consolidated within Exelon's annual SEC Form 10-K filings.

== Controversies ==
In the 1970s through the 1980s, community activist pressure contributed to the delayed opening of nuclear power plants at PECO's Limerick Generating Station and the temporary cancellation of the planned Limerick 2 nuclear power plant, Pennsylvania. Both Limerick 1 and Limerick 2 were built and producing power by 1990.

In 2015, the Earth Quaker Action Team began protesting PECO to demand that it expand the amount of solar energy that it buys, and to source solar power from North Philadelphia in order to create jobs. PECO purchases enough solar energy to power 2,000 residential households. Twice each year, in March and September, it submits those plans to the Pennsylvania's state regulators for approval. The utility runs the bidding process through a third party for energy suppliers and wholesalers. PECO's sister company, Constellation, is the third largest developer in Pennsylvania of solar installations for commercial, industrial, government and customers, and its parent company, Exelon, has a portfolio of wind-generating power projects across the country. PECO currently generates 0.14% of its energy portfolio from solar energy, but, according to the environmental activists group Earth Quaker Action Team, “...could generate up to 20% of their portfolio from solar.” Sourcing solar energy from rooftop solar panels “...would generate 70 jobs...” or “...could generate up to 4000 new jobs in Philadelphia.”
