= List of United States electric companies =

The following page lists electric utilities in the United States.

== Largest utilities by revenue (2022) ==
Rank	Entity	State	Class of ownership	Parent	Number of customers	Sales (MWh)	Revenue ($1,000)	Average retail price/kWh
1	Pacific Gas & Electric	CA	Investor owned	PCG	5,188,308	79,455,318	13,188,085.0	16.64
2	Southern California Edison	CA	Investor owned	EIX	4,963,983	75,828,585	11,939,729.9	15.75
3	Florida Power & Light	FL	Investor owned	NEE	4,708,793	104,431,096	10,526,025.0	10.08
4	Consolidated Edison	NY	Investor owned	ED	2,478,248	19,756,921	5,035,755.0	25.49
5	Georgia Power	GA	Investor owned	SO	2,410,042	83,740,365	8,255,813.0	9.86
6	Dominion Energy	VA	Investor owned	D	2,381,312	75,562,974	6,677,362.6	8.84
7	Ameren	MO	Investor owned	AEE	2,400,000	71,907,000	5,794,000.0	8.05
8	DTE Energy	MI	Investor owned	DTE	2,142,829	41,923,906	4,705,304.0	11.22—
9	Duke Energy Carolinas	NC	Investor owned	DUK	7,400,000	52,700,616	4,852,431.3	8.55
10	Consumers Energy	MI	Investor owned	CMS	1,791,366	33,253,922	4,104,009.7	12.34

== List of US electric companies by state ==
=== Alabama ===
- Alabama Municipal Electric Authority
- Albertville Municipal Utilities Board
- Arab Electric Cooperative
- Alabama Power, a part of the Southern Company
- Athens Utilities, Athens, Limestone County
- Cherokee Electric Cooperative
- Cullman Electric Cooperative, Cullman city and county, Touchstone Energy
- Utilities Board of the City of Cullman
- Decatur Utilities, Municipal Utilities Board of Decatur, Morgan County, Alabama
- Florence Utilities, City of Florence, Lauderdale County
- Franklin Electric Cooperatives, Franklin, Colbert and Lawrence Counties in northwest Alabama
- Guntersville Electric Board
- Huntsville Utilities, City of Huntsville, Madison County
- Joe Wheeler Electric Member Cooperative – Morgan, Lawrence counties, part of Touchstone Energy Cooperatives
- Marshall-DeKalb Electric Cooperative
- PowerSouth Energy Cooperative
- Sand Mountain Electric Cooperative DeKalb, Jackson, Marshall and Cherokee counties
- Scottsboro Electric Power Board
- Tennessee Valley Authority
- Tombigbee Electric Cooperative HQ and service in Hamilton, and Marion County Alabama, with service also in Mississippi
- Wiregrass Electric Cooperative

=== Alaska ===
- Alaska Electric Light & Power
- Chugach Electric Association
- Copper Valley Electric Association
- Golden Valley Electric Association
- Kodiak Electric Association

=== Arizona ===
- Arizona Public Service
- Salt River Project
- Tucson Electric Power
- UniSource Energy Services
- Page Power and Water
- Arizona G&T Cooperatives (AzGT)
  - Arizona Electric Power Cooperative (AEPCO)
  - Sierra Southwest Cooperative Services (Sierra)

=== Arkansas ===
- Southwestern Electric Power Company
- Entergy Arkansas
- Oklahoma Gas and Electric
- Associated Electrical Cooperative

=== California ===
- Alameda Municipal Power
- Anaheim Public Utilities
- Azusa Light & Water
- Burbank Water & Power
- Direct Energy
- East Bay Municipal Utility District
- Glendale Public Service Department
- Gridley Municipal Utilities
- Healdsburg Municipal Electric Department
- Imperial Irrigation District
- Island Energy
- Los Angeles Department of Water and Power
- Modesto Irrigation District
- Nevada Irrigation District
- O'Brien Cogeneration
- Orange County Power Authority
- Pacific Gas and Electric
- PacifiCorp (Pacific Power)
- Pasadena Water & Power
- Riverside Public Utilities
- Roseville Electric
- Sacramento Municipal Utility District
- San Diego Gas & Electric
- San Francisco Public Utilities Commission
- Sierra-Pacific Power
- Silicon Valley Power
- Southern California Edison
- Southern California Public Power Authority
- TID Water & Power - Turlock Irrigation District

=== Colorado ===
- Xcel Energy
- CORE Electric Cooperative
- Colorado Springs Utilities
- Platte River Power Authority
- United Power, Inc.
- Tri-State Generation and Transmission Association (A cooperative of Touchstone)
- Poudre Valley Rural Electric Association (Cooperative of Touchstone Energy)
- La Plata Electric Association (A cooperative of Touchstone Energy)
- Western Area Power Administration
- City of Fountain Electric
- City of Fort Collins Utilities
- City of Loveland Utilities
- City of Longmont Utilities

=== Connecticut ===
- AVANGRID (The United Illuminating Company)
- Direct Energy (NRG Subsidiary)
- Eversource Energy (Connecticut Light and Power, Northeast Utilities)
- Connecticut Light & Power (Eversource Subsidiary)
- United Illuminating Co.
- South Norwalk Electric and Water
- Northeast Utilities
- Wallingford Electric Department
- Positive Energy Electricity Supply LLC
- Viridian Energy
- Bozrah Light & Power
- Your Energy Co
- UI Co.
- CT Green Energy by Viridian
- Public Power, LLC
- Norwich Public Utilities

=== Delaware ===
- Ambit Energy
- City of Dover Electric Department
- City of Milford Electric Department
- City of Newark Electric Department
- City of Seaford Electric Department
- Delaware Electric Cooperative
- Delaware Municipal Electric Corporation
- Delmarva Power, a subsidiary of Exelon
- Lewes Board of Public Works
- Municipal Services Commission of the City of New Castle
- Town of Clayton Electric Department
- Town of Middletown Electric Department
- Town of Smyrna Electric Department
- Direct Energy

=== District of Columbia ===
- PEPCO, a subsidiary of Exelon
- Direct Energy

=== Florida ===
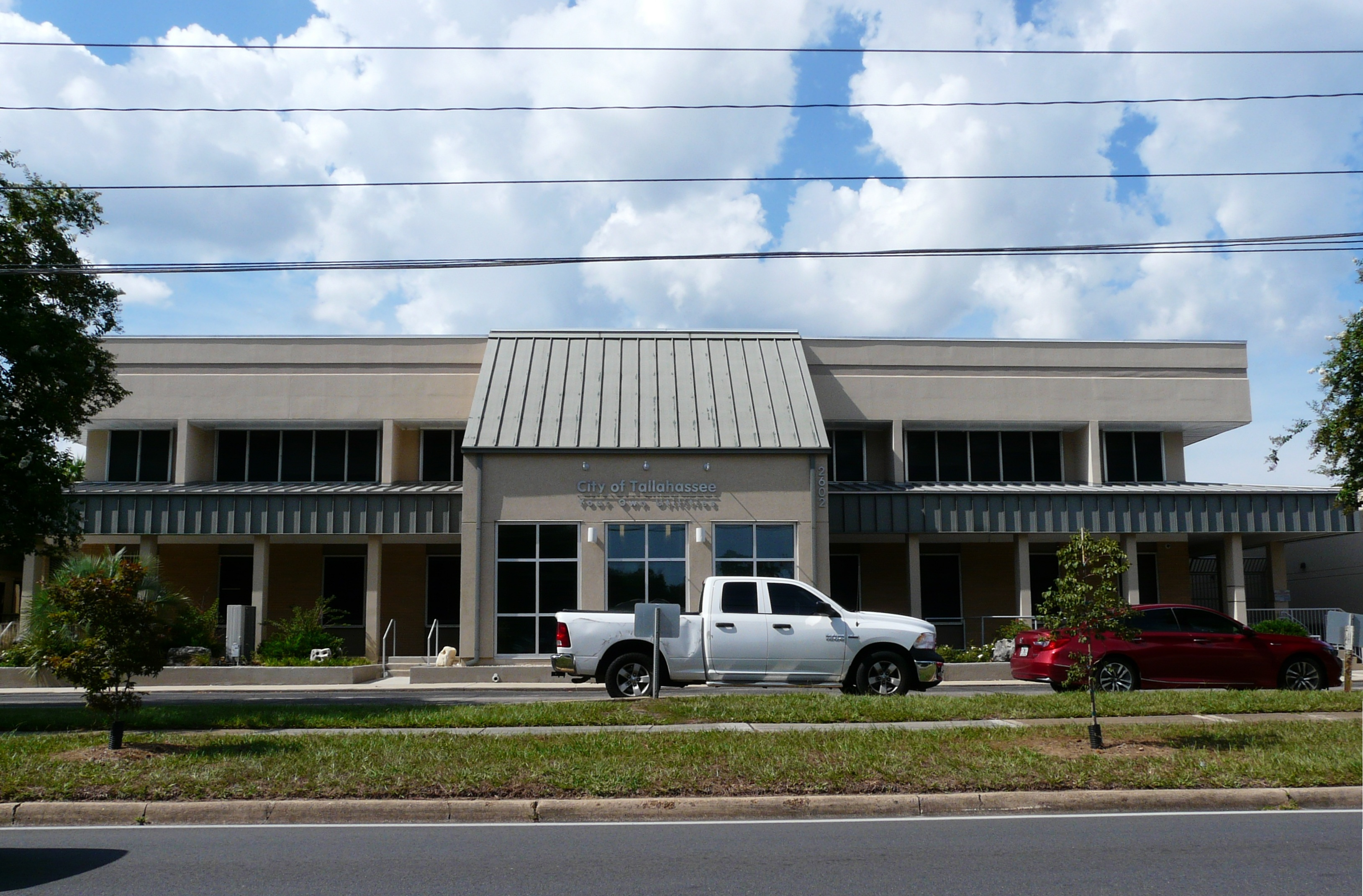
City of Tallahassee Utilities

- Beaches Energy Services
- Central Florida Electric Cooperative
- Choctawhatchee Electric Cooperative
- City of Alachua Public Services Department
- City of Bartow Electric Department
- City of Blountstown Electric Department
- City of Bushnell Utilities Department
- City of Chattahoochee Electric Department
- City of Fort Meade Utilities Department
- City of Green Cove Springs Utilities Department
- City of Lake Worth Utilities Department
- City of Moore Haven Utilities Department
- City of Mount Dora Electric Utility
- City of New Smyrna Beach Utilities Commission
- City of Newberry Electric Utility
- City of Quincy Utilities Department
- City of Starke Utilities Department
- City of Tallahassee Utilities
- City of Vero Beach Electric Utilities
- City of Wachula Utilities
- City of Williston Utilities Department
- City of Winter Park Electric Utility Department
- Clay Electric Cooperative
- Clewiston Utilities
- Duke Energy Florida, a part of Duke Energy
- Escambia River Electric Cooperative
- Florida Keys Electric Cooperative
- Florida Municipal Power Agency
- Florida Power & Light, a part of NextEra Energy
- Florida Public Utilities, a part of Chesapeake Utilities
- Fort Pierce Utilities Authority
- Gainesville Regional Utilities
- Glades Electric Cooperative
- Gulf Coast Electric Cooperative
- Gulf Power Company, a part of NextEra Energy
- Homestead Public Services
- JEA
- Keys Energy Services
- Kissimmee Utility Authority
- Lakeland Electric
- Lake Worth Utilities
- Lee County Electric Cooperative
- Leesburg Electric Department
- Ocala Electric Utility
- Okefenoke Rural Electric Membership Corporation
- Orlando Utilities Commission
- Palm Peach
- Peace River Electric Cooperative
- Progress Energy Florida
- PowerSouth Energy Cooperative
- Reedy Creek Energy Services
- St. Cloud Utilities
- Seminole Electric Cooperative
- Sumter Electric Cooperative
- Suwannee Valley Electric Cooperative
- Talquin Electric Cooperative
- TECO Energy, a part of Emera
- Town of Havana Utilities
- Tri-County Electric Cooperative
- West Florida Electric Cooperative
- Withlacoochee River Electric Cooperative

=== Georgia ===
- Georgia Power, a part of the Southern Company
- Municipal Electric Authority of Georgia (MEAG Power)
- Oglethorpe Power
- BSDK Power
- Tennessee Valley Authority
- Altamaha EMC
- Amicalola EMC
- Abla espanol Electric
- Blue Ridge Mountain EMC
- Canoochee EMC
- Carroll EMC
- Central Georgia EMC
- Coastal Electric Cooperative
- Cobb EMC
- Colquitt EMC
- Coweta-Fayette EMC
- Diverse Power Inc.
- Diverse Power Inc. - Pataula District
- Excelsior EMC
- Flint Energies
- Grady EMC
- GreyStone Power Corp.
- Habersham EMC
- Hart EMC
- Irwin EMC
- Jackson EMC
- Jefferson Energy Cooperative
- Little Ocmulgee EMC
- Marietta Power
- Middle Georgia EMC
- Mitchell EMC
- North Georgia EMC
- Ocmulgee EMC
- Oconee EMC
- Okefenoke REMC
- Planters EMC
- Rayle EMC
- Satilla REMC
- Sawnee EMC
- Slash Pine EMC
- Snapping Shoals EMC
- Southern Rivers Energy
- Sumter EMC
- Three Notch EMC
- Tri-County EMC
- Tri-State EMC
- Upson EMC
- Walton EMC
- Washington EMC
- Direct Energy

=== Hawaii ===
- Hawaiian Electric Company (HECO), Oʻahu subsidiary of Hawaiian Electric Industries
- Hawaiian Electric Light Company (HELCO), Island of Hawaiʻi subsidiary of Hawaiian Electric Industries
- Kauaʻi Island Utility Cooperative (KIUC)
- Maui Electric Company (MECO), Maui County subsidiary of Hawaiian Electric Industries

=== Idaho ===
- Avista
- Clearwater Power
- IDACORP (Idaho Power)
- Intermountain Gas Co. (IGC)
- PacifiCorp (Rocky Mountain Power)

=== Illinois ===
- Ameren
- Champion Energy
- City Water, Light & Power (Springfield, Illinois)
- ComEd, a subsidiary of Exelon
- Direct Energy
- Coles Moultrie Electric Cooperative
- Prairie State Generating Company
- Sullivan Electric Company
- Mid American Energy

=== Indiana ===
- AES Indiana (formerly Indianapolis Power & Light)
- American Electric Power (Indiana Michigan Power)
- Cinergy Corporation
- Duke Energy
- Indiana Municipal Power Agency
- NiSource
- Northern Indiana Public Service Company
- CenterPoint Energy (formerly Vectren; formerly Southern Indiana Gas & Electric Company)

=== Iowa ===
- Interstate Power and Light Company, a part of Alliant Energy
- MidAmerican Energy
- ITC Transmission

=== Kansas ===
- Kansas City Board of Public Utilities
- Evergy
- McPherson BPU

=== Kentucky ===
- American Electric Power
- Cinergy Corporation
- Direct Energy
- Duke Energy
- Kentucky Utilities
- Louisville Gas & Electric
- Owensboro Municipal Utilities
- Tennessee Valley Authority

=== Louisiana ===
- CLECO
- Entergy
- SWEPCO, a subsidiary of American Electric Power
- SLEMCO
- SPECTRUM
- Louisiana Power
- Cajun Electric Power Co-op
- Claiborne Electric Co-op
- South Louisiana Electric Co-op
- Northeast Louisiana Power Cooperative
- Beauregard Electric Co-op Inc.
- Concordia Electric Co-op
- Jefferson Davis Electric Co-op
- WST Electric
- Mervin Danclar Entergy
- Entergy
- Dixie Electric Membership Corp.
- Lafayette Utilities System

=== Maine ===
- AVANGRID (Central Maine Power)
- Direct Energy
- Versant Power, a part of ENMAX

=== Maryland ===
- A&N Electric Cooperative
- Agway Energy Services
- Allegheny Electric Cooperative
- Ambit Energy
- Baltimore Gas and Electric, a subsidiary of Exelon
- Berlin Electric Utility Department
- Champion Energy
- Choptank Electric Cooperative
- Conectiv, a subsidiary of PEPCO which is a subsidiary of Exelon
- Delmarva Power, a subsidiary of Exelon
- Direct Energy
- Easton Utilities
- FirstEnergy (Potomac Edison)
- Hagerstown Light Department
- Just Energy
- Southern Maryland Electric Cooperative (SMECO)
- Town of Thurmont Municipal Light Company
- Town of Williamsport Utilities

=== Massachusetts ===
- Ashburnham Municipal Light
- Belmont Municipal Light
- Berkshire Company (WMECO)
- Braintree Electric Light Department
- Boylston Electric Light Department
- Chester Municipal Electric Light
- Chicopee Electric Light Department
- Concord Municipal Light Plant
- Danvers Electric Department
- Eversource Energy (NSTAR, Western Massachusetts Electric)
- Fairfield Electric cooperative
- Georgetown Electric Department
- Gosnold Municipal Electric Plant
- Groton Electric Department
- Groveland Light Department
- Hingham Municipal Light Department
- Holden Municipal Light Department
- Holyoke Gas and Electric
- Hudson Light and Water Department
- Hull Electric Light Department
- Ipswich Electric Light Department
- Littleton Electric Light and Water Department
- Marblehead Municipal Light Department
- Mansfield Municipal Light Department
- Merrimac Light and Water Department
- Middleboro Municipal Gas and Electric Department
- Middleton Municipal Light Department
- National Grid (Massachusetts Electric, Nantucket Electric)
- North Attleboro Electric Department
- Northeast Utilities
- Norwood Electric Light Department
- NSTAR
- Paxton Municipal Light Department
- Peabody Municipal Light Plant
- Princeton Electric Light Department
- Reading Municipal Light Department
- Rowley Electric Light Department
- Russell Municipal Light Department
- Shrewsbury Electric Light Department
- South Hadley Electric Light Department
- Sterling Electric Light Department
- Taunton Municipal Light Plant
- Templeton Municipal Light Company
- Unitil Corporation
- Wakefield Municipal Gas and Light Department
- Wellesley Municipal Light Plant
- West Boylston Municipal Lighting
- Westfield Gas and Electric Department
- PTI Electric Department
- Direct Energy

=== Michigan ===
- Alger Delta Electric Cooperative
- Alpena Power Company
- American Electric Power (Indiana Michigan Power)
- Cherryland Electric Cooperative
- Cloverland Electric Cooperative (Cloverland acquired Edison Sault Electric Company in 2009)
- Consumers Energy
- DTE Energy (DTE Energy Electric Company)
- Great Lakes Energy Cooperative
- Holland Board of Public Works
- Homeworks Tri-County Electric Cooperative
- ITC Transmission
- Lansing Board of Water & Light
- Lowell Light and Power
- Midwest Energy & Communications (Cooperative)
- Ontonagon County REA (Cooperative)
- Presque Isle Electric & Gas Cooperative
- Thumb Electric Cooperative
- Upper Peninsula Power Company
- We Energies
- Wyandotte Municipal Services

=== Minnesota ===
- Basin Electric Power Cooperative
- Dairyland Power Cooperative
- East River Electric Power Co-op
- Freeborn-Mower Co-op Services
- Great Plains Natural Gas Co. (GPNG)
- Great River Energy, and its 28 member cooperatives
- Hutchinson Utilities Commission
- Interstate Power and Light Company
- L&O Power Co-op
- Marshall Municipal Utilities
- Minnkota Power Cooperative, and its 11 member cooperatives
- Missouri River Energy
- Northern States Power Company, a subsidiary of Xcel Energy
- People's Co-op Tri-County Electric
- Otter Tail Power Company
- Rochester Public Utilities Commission
- Southern Minnesota Municipal Power Agency
- Willmar Municipal Utilities
- Xcel Energy

=== Mississippi ===
- Entergy Mississippi
- Magnolia Electric Power
- Mississippi Power, a part of the Southern Company
- Cooperative Energy, formerly South Mississippi Electric Power Association
- Tennessee Valley Authority
- Pearl River Valley EPA
- Yazoo Valley Electric Power Association

=== Missouri ===
- Ameren
- Aquila
- Black River Electric Cooperative
- City of Columbia Water and Light
- City Utilities of Springfield
- Hannibal, Missouri
- Citizens Electric Corporation
- Empire District Electric Company
- Independence Power and Light
- Intercounty Electric Cooperative Association
- Cuivre River Electric Cooperative
- Kansas City Power and Light Company
- Laclede Electric Cooperative
- Macon Electric Cooperative
- Missouri Rural Electric Cooperative
- North Central Missouri Electric Cooperative
- Howell-Oregon Electric Cooperative
- Ozark Border Electric Cooperative
- Semo Electric Cooperative
- Sa-Ma-No Electric Cooperative
- White River Valley Electric Cooperative

=== Montana ===
- Central Montana Electric Power Cooperative
- Montana-Dakota Utilities Co. (MDU)
- Montana Electric Cooperatives' Association
- Northwestern Energy

=== Nebraska ===
- Nebraska Public Power District
- Omaha Public Power District
- Lincoln Electric System
- Fremont Department of Utilities
- Western Area Power Administration

=== Nevada ===
- NV Energy (Nevada Power)
- NextEra (Valley Electric Association)
- Wells Rural Electric Company
- Boulder City Electric Utility
- Harney Electric Cooperative
- Lincoln Power County Power District No. 1
- Mt Wheeler Power
- Overton Power
- Plumas Sierra Electric Cooperative
- Surprise Valley Electric Cooperative

=== New Hampshire ===
- Eversource Energy (Public Service Company of New Hampshire)
- Liberty Utilities (including Granite State Electric)
- New Hampshire Electric Cooperative
- Northeast Utilities
- National Grid
- Unitil Corporation

=== New Jersey ===
Investor-owned utilities

- Atlantic City Electric, a subsidiary of Exelon
- Jersey Central Power and Light Company, a subsidiary of FirstEnergy
- Public Service Electric and Gas Company (PSE&G)
- Rockland Electric, a subsidiary of Orange and Rockland, which is a subsidiary of Consolidated Edison

Municipal and cooperative utilities

- Borough of Madison Electric Utility
- Borough of Milltown Electric Department
- Borough of Park Ridge Electric Department
- Borough of Seaside Heights Electric Utility
- Borough of South River Electric Department
- Butler Power and Light
- Lavallette Electric Department
- Pemberton Borough Electric Department
- Sussex Rural Electric Cooperative
- Vineland Municipal Electric Utility

=== New Mexico ===
- El Paso Electric
- Public Service Company of New Mexico
- Southwestern Public Service Company, a subsidiary of Xcel Energy
- Texas-New Mexico Power
- Tri-State Generation and Transmission Association

=== New York ===
- Akron Municipal Electric Department
- Angelica Municipal Electric Department
- Approved Energy
- Bath Municipal Electric Department
- Bergen Municipal Electric Department
- Boonville Municipal Electric Department
- Brocton Municipal Electric Department
- Castle Municipal Electric Department
- Central Hudson Gas & Electric
- CH Energy Group
- Churchville Municipal Electric Department
- Consolidated Edison Company of New York, subsidiary of Consolidated Edison
- Direct Energy
- East Coast Power & Gas
- Fishers Island Municipal Electric Department
- Frankfort Municipal Electric Department
- Freeport Electric Department
- Green Island Municipal Electric Department
- Greenport Municipal Electric Department
- Greene Municipal Electric Department
- Groton Municipal Electric Department
- Hamilton Municipal Electric Department
- Ilion Municipal Electric Department
- Jamestown Municipal Electric Department
- Lake Placid Municipal Electric Department
- Long Island Power Authority (LIPA), operated by PSEG Long Island
- Marathon Municipal Electric Department
- Massena Electric Department
- Mayville Municipal Electric Department
- National Grid (Niagara Mohawk)
- New York Power Authority (NYPA)
- New York State Electric & Gas, subsidiary of AVANGRID
- Orange and Rockland, which is a subsidiary of Consolidated Edison
- Penn Yan Municipal Electric Department
- Philadelphia Municipal Electric Department
- Plattsburgh Municipal Light Department
- Northeast Utilities
- Rochester Gas & Electric, subsidiary of AVANGRID
- Rockville Centre Municipal Electric Department
- Rouses Point Electric Department
- Salamanca Municipal Electric Department
- Sherburne Municipal Electric Department
- Sherrill Municipal Electric Department
- Skaneateles Municipal Electric Department
- Sliver Springs Municipal Electric Department
- Solvay Electric Department
- Spencerport Municipal Electric Department
- Springville Municipal Electric Department
- Theresa Municipal Electric Department
- Tupper Lake Municipal Electric Department
- Watkins Glen Municipal Electric Department
- Waverly Municipal Electric Department
- Wellsville Municipal Electric Department
- Westfield Municipal Electric Department

=== North Carolina ===
- Albemarle Electric Membership Corporation
- Blue Ridge Energy
- Brunswick Electric Membership Corporation
- Cape Hatteras Electric Cooperative
- Carteret-Craven Electric Cooperative
- Central Electric Membership Corporation
- City of Apex Electric Department
- City of Concord Electric Department
- Dominion North Carolina Power
- Duke Energy
- Edgecombe-Martin County Electric Membership Corporation
- EnergyUnited
- Four County Electric Membership Corporation
- French Broad Electric Membership Corporation
- Greenville Utilities Commission
- Halifax Electric Membership Corporation
- Haywood Electric Membership Corporation
- Jones-Onslow Electric Membership Corporation
- Lumbee River Electric Membership Corporation
- New River Light & Power
- North Carolina Electric Membership Corporation
- Pee Dee Electric Membership Corporation
- Piedmont Electric Membership Corporation
- Pitt & Greene Electric Membership Corporation
- Randolph Electric Membership Corporation
- Roanoke Electric Cooperative
- Rutherford Electric Membership Corporation
- South River Electric Membership Corporation
- Surry-Yadkin Electric Membership Corporation
- Tennessee Valley Authority
- Tideland Electric Membership Corporation
- Tri-County Electric Membership Corporation
- Union Power Cooperative
- Wake Electric Membership Corporation

=== North Dakota ===
- Basin Electric Power Cooperative
- Central Power Electric Cooperative
- Montana Dakota Utilities Co. (MDU)
- Minnkota Power Cooperative
- Northern States Power Company, a subsidiary of Xcel Energy
- Otter Tail Power Company
- Upper Missouri Power Cooperative (Upper Missouri G&T Cooperative)
- Xcel Energy

=== Ohio ===
- American Electric Power
- Consolidated Electric Cooperative
- Dayton Power & Light
- Direct Energy
- Duke Energy
- FirstEnergy (Cleveland Electric Illuminating Company, Ohio Edison, Toledo Edison)
- South Central Power Company

=== Oklahoma ===
- East Central Electric Cooperative
- Oklahoma Gas & Electric
- Public Service Company of Oklahoma (part of American Electric Power)
- Western Farmers Electric Cooperative

=== Oregon ===
- Blachly-Lane Electric Cooperative
- Cascade Natural Gas Corporation (CNGC)
- Central Lincoln Public Utilities District
- Clatskanie PUD
- Columbia River PUD
- Consumers Power Inc.
- Coos-Curry Electric Coop
- Douglas Electric Cooperative
- Emerald PUD
- Eugene Water & Electric Board (EWEB)
- Hood River Electric & Internet Co-op
- Lane Electric Cooperative
- Midstate Electric Cooperative
- Northern Wasco County Public Utilities District
- PacifiCorp (Pacific Power)
- Portland General Electric
- Salem Electric
- Springfield Utility Board
- Tillamook Public Utilities District
- West Oregon Electric Cooperative
- Umatilla Electric Cooperative

=== Pennsylvania ===
- Adams Electric Cooperative
- Allegheny Electric Cooperative
- Bedford Rural Electric Cooperative
- Borough of Ephrata Electric Division
- Borough of Hatfield Electric Utility
- Borough of Kutztown Electric Department
- Borough of Quakertown Electric Department
- Borough of Schuylkill Haven Utilities Department
- Central Electric Cooperative
- Citizen's Electric Company
- Claverack Rural Electric Cooperative
- Direct Energy
- Duquesne Light
- FirstEnergy (Met-Ed, Penelec, Penn Power, West Penn Power)
- Lansdale Electric
- New Enterprise Rural Electric Cooperative
- Northeast Utilities
- Northwestern Rural Electric Cooperative
- PECO, a subsidiary of Exelon
- Perkasie Borough Electric Department
- Pike County Light & Power
- PPL Corporation
- REA Energy Cooperative
- Rural Valley Electric Co.
- Somerset Rural Electric Cooperative
- Sullivan County Rural Electric Cooperative
- Tri-County Rural Electric Cooperative
- UGI Utilities
- United Electric Cooperative
- Valley Rural Electric Cooperative
- Warren Electric Cooperative
- Wellsboro Electric Company

=== Puerto Rico ===
- Puerto Rico Electric Power Authority
- EcoEléctrica

=== Rhode Island ===
- Direct Energy
- Rhode Island Energy
- Northeast Utilities
- Pascoag Utility District

=== South Carolina ===
- Aiken Electric Co-Op
- Berkeley Electric Co-Op
- Black River Electric Co-op
- Blue Ridge Electric Co-op
- Broad River Electric Co-op
- Central Electric Power Cooperative, Inc.
- Coastal Electric Co-op
- Duke Energy
- Edisto Electric Co-op
- Fairfield Electric Co-op
- Horry Electric Co-op
- Laurens Electric Co-op
- Little River Electric Co-op
- Lynches River Electric Co-op
- Mid-Carolina Electric Co-op
- Newberry Electric Co-op
- Palmetto Electric Co-op
- Progress Energy Carolinas
- Santee Cooper
- Santee Electric Co-op
- Dominion Energy
- Tri-County Electric Co-Op
- York Electric Co-op

=== South Dakota ===
- Black Hills Power
- East River Electric Cooperative
- MidAmerican Energy Company
- Montana-Dakota Utilities Co. (MDU)
- Northern States Power Company, a subsidiary of Xcel Energy
- Northwestern Energy
- Otter Tail Power Company
- Rushmore Electric Cooperative
- Xcel Energy

=== Tennessee ===
- Appalachian Power, a unit of American Electric Power
- Brightridge Electric
- Chickasaw Electric Cooperative
- Citizens Utilities Board
- Duck River Electric (DREMC)
- EPB (Electric Power Board), Chattanooga, Hamilton County
- Knoxville Utilities Board
- Lenoir City Utilities Board
- Memphis Light, Gas and Water
- Middle Tennessee Electric, Electric Cooperative
- Nashville Electric Service, metro Nashville, Davidson County
- Tennessee Valley Authority

=== Texas ===
- Austin Energy
- American Electric Power
- Amigo Energy
- South West Energy
- Bartlett Electric Cooperative
- Brazos Electric Power Cooperative
- CenterPoint Energy
- City of Bryan
- City of Greenville
- Comanche Electric Cooperative
- CoServ Electric
- Cosery Electric
- CPS Energy
- Denton Municipal Electric
- Duke energy
- Direct Energy
- dPi Energy
- El Paso Electric
- Electric Database Publishing
- Entergy
- Entrust Energy
- First Texas Energy Corporation
- Fort Belknap Electric Cooperative
- Garland Power & Light
- GDF SUEZ Energy Resources
- Golden Spread Electric Cooperative
- Hudson Energy
- Hamilton County Electric Cooperative
- Heart of Texas Electric Cooperative
- HILCO Electric Cooperative
- J-A-C Electric Cooperative
- Lower Colorado River Authority
- Luminant
- MidSouth Synergy
- Navarro County Electric Cooperative
- Navasota Valley Electric Cooperative
- Oncor Electric Delivery (Formerly TXU)
- Pedernales Electric Cooperative
- PenTex Energy
- Rayburn Electric Cooperative
- Reliant Energy
- South Plains Electric Cooperative
- Southwestern Public Service Company, a subsidiary of Xcel Energy
- Texas Electric Service Company
- Texas New Mexico Power
- Tara Energy
- Tri-County Electric Cooperative
- TXU Energy
- United Cooperative Services
- Wise Electric Cooperative

=== Utah ===
- City of Bountiful
- IPA
- City of Kaysville
- PacifiCorp (Rocky Mountain Power)
- pacificorp (Dominion Energy)
- Bridger Valley Electric Association, Inc.
- Dixie-Escalante Rural Electric Association, Inc.dba Dixie Power
- Empire Electric Association, Inc.
- Garkane Energy Cooperative, Inc.
- Moon Lake Electric Association, Inc.
- Mt. Wheeler Power, Inc.
- Raft River Rural Electric Cooperative, Inc.
- Wells Rural Electric Company
- Deseret Generation & Transmission Cooperative
- South Utah Valley Electric Service District
- Strawberry Water Users Association
- Ticaboo Utility Improvement District

=== Vermont ===
- Burlington Electric Department
- Green Mountain Power
- Vermont Electric Cooperative
- Washington Electric Cooperative
- Village of Jacksonville Electric

=== Virginia ===
- A&N Electric Cooperative
- Appalachian Power, a subsidiary of American Electric Power
- BARC Electric Cooperative
- Community Electric Cooperative
- Craig-Botetourt Electric Cooperative
- Danville Utilities
- Dominion Virginia Power
- Mecklenburg Electric Cooperative
- Northern Neck Electric Cooperative
- Northern Virginia Electric Cooperative
- Old Dominion Electric Cooperative
- Prince George Electric Cooperative
- Rappahannock Electric Cooperative
- Shenandoah Valley Electric Cooperative
- Southside Electric Cooperative

=== Washington ===
- Avista Utilities
- Benton County Public Utility District
- Big Bend Electric
- Cascade Natural Gas Corp. (CNGC)
- Chelan County Public Utility District
- City of Milton
- Clark Public Utilities
- Clearwater Power
- Columbia Rural Electric
- Douglas County Public Utility District
- Elmurst Mutual
- Franklin County Public Utility District
- Grant County Public Utility District
- Klickitat Public Utility District
- Lakeview Light & Power
- Mason County Public Utility District 3
- Modern Electric Water
- Nespelem Valley Electric
- Ohop Mutual
- Okanaogan Country Electric & Propane
- Orcas Power and Light Coop (OPALCO)
- Parkland Light & Water
- PacifiCorp (Pacific Power)
- Peninsula Light Co
- Pend Oreille County Public Utility District
- Puget Sound Energy
- Seattle City Light
- Snohomish County Public Utility District
- Tacoma Power
- Tanner Electric Coop
- Town of Steilacoom
- Town of Eatonville

=== West Virginia ===
- American Electric Power (Appalachian Power, Wheeling Electric Power)
- FirstEnergy (Mon Power, Potomac Edison)
- Black Diamond Power Company

=== Wisconsin ===
- Dairyland Power Cooperative (and its 25 member cooperatives)
- Madison Gas and Electric
- Northern States Power Company-Wisconsin, a subsidiary of Xcel Energy
- We Energies
- Wisconsin Power and Light Company, a part of Alliant Energy
- Wisconsin Public Service Corporation

=== Wyoming ===
- Cheyenne Light, Fuel & Power
- Lower Valley Energy
- Bridger Valley
- Niobrara Electric
- Black Hills Power
- Powder River Energy Corporation (A cooperative of Touchstone Energy)
- Carbon Power & Light (A cooperative of Touchstone Energy)
- PacifiCorp (Rocky Mountain Power)
- Tri-State Generation and Transmission Association (A cooperative of Touchstone Energy)
- Western Area Power Administration

== See also ==
- Electricity distribution companies by country
- List of Canadian electric utilities
- List of electric cooperatives in the United States
- List of public utilities
