= Whitefish Energy =

Holding company in Montana

Whitefish Energy Holdings, LLC (d/b/a Whitefish Energy) is a small holding company based in Whitefish, Montana whose portfolio of companies installs, maintains, and repairs electrical grids. The holding company was founded in 2015 by Andy Techmanski, a former lineman. In October 2017, Whitefish, a company whose previous biggest assignment was $1.4 million, was awarded a $300 million contract to repair part of the energy infrastructure in Puerto Rico following Hurricane Maria. This contract involved Puerto Rico Electric Power Authority (PREPA). The contract was ultimately canceled after coming under public scrutiny; the company relied on subcontracted workers, who were paid several times less than the sum Whitefish Energy charged PREPA in return, which was described by The New York Times as "far above the norm even for emergency work — and almost 17 times the average salary of [such workers] in Puerto Rico."

== History ==
Whitefish Energy Holdings LLC was founded in 2015 by Andy Techmanski, a former lineman with more than twenty years of experience in the electric power industry. The company has been funded by Dallas-based HBC Investments, by Flat Creek Capital Management, and by Brazil's Comtrafo Transformers. In 2016, a 51% stake in the company was sold to Comtrafo S.A.

== Hurricane Maria controversy ==
After Hurricane Maria struck Puerto Rico in September 2017, the Puerto Rico Electric Power Authority (PREPA) awarded Whitefish a no-bid contract for up to $300 million to repair part of the island's electrical grid. As part of the contract, Whitefish was paid a tender of $3.7 million upfront.

The awarding of the contract was unusual in several respects. The contract stipulated that the Federal Emergency Management Agency (FEMA) approved its terms, but FEMA categorically denied any involvement with the contract. Moreover, when questioned about the stipulation, PREPA executive director Ricardo Ramos said that, "There [was] no other explanation for that other than an 'oops.'" Furthermore, FEMA expressed that it had "significant concerns over how PREPA procured this contract" and that the agency had not confirmed "whether the contract prices [were] reasonable" because the contract was given without the competitive bidding process typically associated with federal contracts. The no bidding contracting, however, was performed lawfully under Puerto Rican law, as Puerto Rico governor Ricardo Rossello had proclaimed an executive order beforehand that left without effect all the processes established by law or by regulation to contract private entities, using as an argument for its decree a previously lawfully declared state of emergency.

Another point of contention regarding the contract was its wording. Specifically, a clause in the contract prevents the government from auditing or reviewing its labor cost and profit elements. According to NPR, such elements would likely be the core interest of any auditor.

A third reason for labeling the contract as unusual was that PREPA chose Whitefish rather than using their mutual aid agreements with mainland utilities. Ramos countered that Whitefish did not require a $25 million tender as the other bidder did. PREPA's emergency fund had only $100 million, which Ramos believed would be quickly exhausted if he hired another public utility to assist with repairs. Furthermore, PREPA's mutual aid agreements required the utility company to undertake the logistics of housing workers and transporting materials to the island, while Whitefish's contract did not.

When asked to comment, the American Public Power Association (APPA) said that PREPA chose not to activate mutual aid programs and that the utility company "had already contracted with Whitefish Energy by the time [APPA] convened a conference call to coordinate aid."

Whitefish's size also drew attention. Before being awarded PREPA's contract, Whitefish's largest contract was a $1.3 million electrical upgrade in Arizona. In addition, Whitefish, as a holding company, only had two employees when the hurricane struck. Moreover, their primary investor, HBC Investments, was founded by Joe Colonnetta, a "prominent donor" of incumbent U.S. President Donald Trump during his 2016 presidential campaign. Whitefish CEO Andy Techmanski and United States Secretary of the Interior Ryan Zinke also know each other, as both hail from Whitefish, Montana. Techmanski also admitted that he had been in touch with Zinke in the aftermath of Hurricane Maria to try to free up more resources since getting crews and equipment to Puerto Rico had been difficult. Additionally, one of Zinke's sons also worked at one of Techmanski's construction sites in the past. Well-known Fortune 500 global engineering firm Fluor Corporation also received a rebuild contract; the U.S. Army Corps of Engineers contract was for $240 million, $60 million less than "tiny" Whitefish's contract.

After the contract was awarded, Whitefish sent 300 workers—mostly subcontractors—to Puerto Rico to rebuild 100 miles of transmission lines. Among those subcontracted were the Jacksonville Electric Authority, the Kissimmee Utility Authority, and Lakeland Electric, three public utility companies. The subcontracting of public utility companies raised further questions as such hiring is unusual, since such resources could have been hired under the aforementioned mutual aid agreements, possibly at a lower cost; El Nuevo Dia reports that extra workers hired by Whitefish were 10 times more expensive than PREPA's own workers. A few days after beginning work on the island, Whitefish said that it expected to have over 1,000 workers involved with the contract. According to a November 12, 2017, New York Times article, Whitefish Energy had hired contract workers, electricians from Florida, to do the work. The Times reported that in their contract Whitefish Energy Holdings was allowed to charge PREPA "$319 an hour for linemen, a rate that industry experts said was far above the norm even for emergency work — and almost 17 times the average salary of their counterparts in Puerto Rico." Whitefish had in turn paid the Florida linesman wages ranging to $42 per hour plus overtime, to $100 per hour. A Whitefish spokesman said that the higher contract prices were due to overhead costs, adding that the company had to pay a premium to entice workers to come to Puerto Rico, and that many workers received overtime pay for every hour worked, with overtime rates influenced by many factors.

On October 29, 2017, a few weeks after the award, Rossello requested to the PREPA board of directors to cancel the contract with Whitefish. Within a few hours, the board satisfied the request. In response, Ramos said that the cancellation amounted to a delay of ten to twelve weeks in the restoration work, "if nothing [were] done." A day later, The Wall Street Journal reported that the Federal Bureau of Investigation (FBI) was investigating the awarded contract.

Cruiseline French America Line claimed to be working with Whitefish Energy, and that their boat the Louisiane would serve as "headquarters for relief services" after Hurricane Maria. Further investigation revealed that the boat had been docked in New Orleans since 2016. French America Line has been accused of scamming customers without delivering on services, and some have alleged the company used proposed "hurricane relief services" as a coverup.
