= KUA (disambiguation) =

KUA is the IATA code for Sultan Haji Ahmad Shah Airport, an airport in Malaysia.

KUA or Kua may also refer to:

- Kimball Union Academy, boarding school in the U.S. state of New Hampshire
- Kissimmee Utility Authority, electrical utility in Osceola County, Florida, U.S.
- Kua or Tshwa language, a dialect of East Kalahari Khoe used in Botswana and Zimbabwe
- Kwanyama dialect's ISO 839-3 code, a dialect of the Ovambo language used in Angola and Namibia
- South Campus (University of Copenhagen), also known as KUA (Københavns Universitet Amager)
- Kua Ruins, a historic site

== See also ==
- KVA (disambiguation)
