= Florida Municipal Power Agency =

American nonprofit utilities company

The Florida Municipal Power Agency (FMPA) is a nonprofit, wholesale electric utilities and associated services company that serves its 31 Florida municipal electric utility system members. Based in Tallahassee, with its operational offices in Orlando FMPA is a governmental entity, established as a separate legal entity pursuant to interlocal agreement. FMPA's statutory authorization is found in section 163.01, Florida Statutes, and part II, chapter 361, Florida Statutes.

FMPA was created on February 24, 1978, by the signing of the Interlocal Agreement Creating the Florida Municipal Power Agency. Originally, 17 municipal electric utility systems were members of FMPA. FMPA was created largely in response to the Arab oil embargo that hit the U.S. economy hard in the 1970s. At that time, many of Florida's municipal electric utilities were trying to determine how to survive, and small cities needed the economies of scale that a larger organization could provide. With a $2 million seed money loan, the original members of FMPA created an organization to serve and support them, and to ensure the survival and vitality of Florida's municipal electric utilities in the future.

== Member utilities ==
- Alachua
- Bartow
- Blountstown
- Bushnell
- Chattahoochee
- Clewiston
- Fort Meade
- Fort Pierce Utilities Authority
- Gainesville Regional Utilities
- Green Cove Springs
- Havana
- Homestead Energy Services
- Jacksonville Beach
- Key West
- Kissimmee Utility Authority
- Lake Worth
- Lakeland Electric
- Leesburg
- Moore Haven
- Mount Dora
- New Smyrna Beach
- Newberry
- Ocala
- Orlando Utilities Commission
- Quincy
- Starke
- St. Cloud
- Vero Beach
- Wauchula
- Williston
- Winter Park

== Power Supply Projects ==
FMPA currently has five power supply projects:

=== All-Requirements Power Supply Project ===
The All-Requirements Power Supply Project (ARP) is FMPA's largest power supply project, and taken alone, is the fourth largest electric utility system in the state of Florida, with a peak demand of more than 1,200 MW. Fifteen of FMPA's member electric utility systems are currently participants in the ARP. The ARP is also the full requirements provider for the City of Quincy in the Florida Panhandle.

The ARP system stretches from Key West to the Town of Havana in the Florida Panhandle. While owning minimal transmission assets, FMPA is largely a transmission dependent utility, requiring access to, and use of, the electric transmission systems of large, vertically integrated investor-owned electric utilities.

The ARP system includes numerous generation facilities, including the Treasure Coast Energy Center Unit 1 (TCEC1) and the ARP's newest generation facility, Cane Island Unit 4 (CI4). CI4 is a nominal 300 MW combined cycle electric generation station. CI4 achieved commercial operation on July 11, 2011, and is the most efficient and cleanest power station in the State of Florida at this time. CI4 is fueled by clean burning natural gas. CI4 is owned entirely by FMPA and located at the Cane Island Generating Facility which it co-owns and operates with the Kissimmee Utility Authority near Intercession City, Florida.

=== St. Lucie Project ===
The St. Lucie Project was the first FMPA power supply project. Fifteen of FMPA's members participate in the St. Lucie Project, which owns an 8.8% ownership interest in the Florida Power & Light St. Lucie Unit No. 2 nuclear plant, a nominally 987 MW generating facility.

=== Stanton Projects ===
- The Stanton Project owns a 14.8% share of the Stanton Unit No. 1, a 425 MW coal plant operated by OUC and located at the Curtis H. Stanton Energy Center in Orange County.
- The Tri-City Project owns an additional 5.3% share of Stanton Unit No. 1. Three FMPA members participate in the Tri-City Project: Fort Pierce, Homestead, and Key West.
- The Stanton II Project owns a 23.2% share of Stanton Unit No. 2, a 429 MW coal plant operated by OUC and located at the Stanton Energy Center. Seven FMPA members participate in the Stanton II Project: Fort Pierce, Homestead, Key West, Kissimmee, St. Cloud, Starke, and Vero Beach.

== Governance ==
FMPA is governed by its board of directors. Each of FMPA's member systems is entitled to appoint one director and alternate directors to serve on the board. The board governs the business and affairs of FMPA generally, and each of FMPA's projects, except the All-Requirements Power Supply Project.

Each director (or his or her alternate acting in the place of the director) has at least one vote on all board matters. Directors representing members that participate in a power supply project, but not the ARP get an additional one-half vote (thus, they may cast 1.5 votes). Directors representing members that participate in the ARP get one additional vote (thus, they may cast 2 votes).

== ARP Governance ==
The ARP is governed by FMPA's executive committee. Each ARP participant is entitled to appoint an executive committee member and alternates. The executive committee governs the business and affairs of the ARP and approves the FMPA general (non-projects) budget.

== Leadership ==
There are four elected board officers, two executive committee elected officers, and two appointed board officers that, subject to the authority of the board of directors and the executive committee have charge over managing the business and affairs of FMPA. Elected officers of the board and executive committee are elected each year at the annual meeting of FMPA's board of directors, which has always been held in conjunction with the FMEA-FMPA Annual Conference.

=== Board of directors ===
Currently, FMPA's elected board officers are:

- Chairman – Bill Conrad (City of Newberry)
- Vice chairman – Barbara Quiñones (City of Homestead)
- Secretary – Lynne Tejeda (Keys Energy Services)
- Treasurer – Larry Mattern (Kissimmee Utility Authority)

=== Executive committee ===
FMPA's elected executive committee officers are:

- Chairperson – Howard McKinnon (Town of Havana)
- Vice Chairperson – Lynne Tejeda (Keys Energy Services)

== See also ==
- American Public Power Association
