= Mickey pylon =

Power line pylon in Florida

Coordinates: 28.3038°N 81.5742°W

Mickey Pylon

The Mickey pylon (also known as the Mickey Mouse pylon) is a 105-foot-tall (32 m) double-deadend pole-type 230-kV power line pylon in front of Osceola Substation, which is used by The Walt Disney Company division Reedy Creek Energy Services for the power supply of Walt Disney World near Orlando, Florida, and which was completed on February 15, 1996. The pylon is in the form of a stylized Mickey Mouse head. It consists of a 70-foot-high (21 m) pole carrying a circular steel tube ring 30 ft (9.1 m) in diameter, at which two smaller elliptical rings with minor axis lengths of 18 ft (5.5 m) and major axis lengths of 20 ft (6.1 m). The head weighs 30,000 lb (14,000 kg). It is located along Interstate 4 on the north side of the highway, at the junction with World Drive and the Central Florida GreeneWay (Exit 62).

As the rings were not transportable on public roads, they were designed for an assembly at the construction site. Each ring is constructed from 12-by-20-inch (300 mm × 510 mm) galvanized steel tubing.

The support pole was fabricated by North American Pole Corp. (NAPCO), Dallas, Texas, United States, while the rings were bent by Bend-Tec of Duluth, Minnesota, from steel tubes manufactured in Chicago, Illinois, and transported to NAPCO for galvanization.

The pylon can be illuminated at night by fiber-optic cables at the rings, which are fed from a laser installed at the ground through a telecommunications-grade fiber running inside the pole.

Polymer insulators are used to minimize visual effects.

== History ==
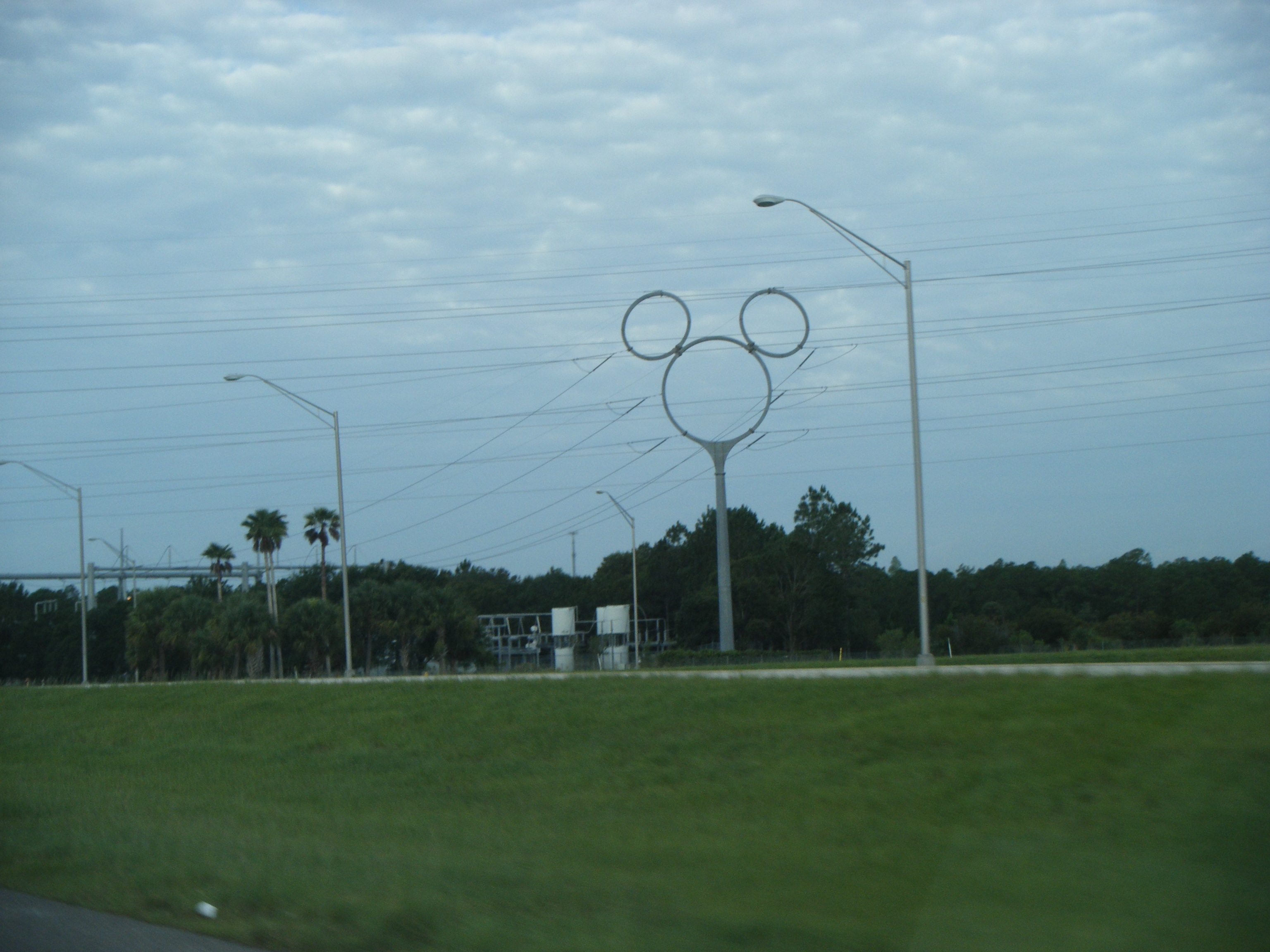
A daytime view of the Mickey pylon.

In March 1995, plans to start building the pole were created by a contract signed by Tampa Electric (TECO) and the Reedy Creek Improvement District. The pylon serves to connect a nearby TECO-built substation to a transmission line owned by the Orlando Utilities Commission.
