= St. Lucie Nuclear Power Plant =

Nuclear Power Station in Port St. Lucie, Florida

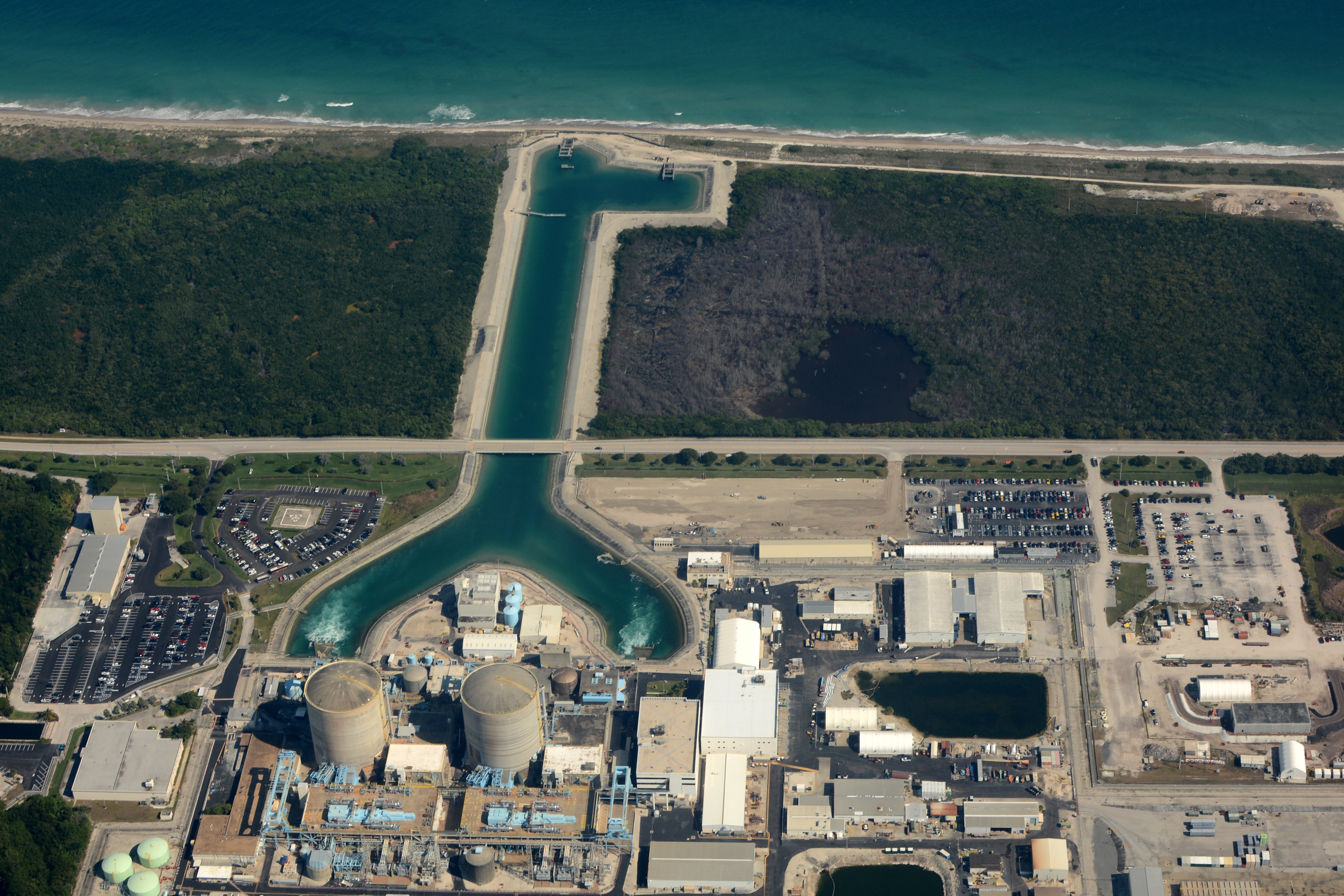
- Overhead view of St. Lucie Nuclear Power Plant
- Country: United States
- Location: Port St. Lucie, St. Lucie County, Florida
- Coordinates: 27°20′55″N 80°14′47″W
- Status: Operational
- Construction began: Unit 1: July 1, 1970; Unit 2: June 2, 1977
- Commission date: Unit 1: December 21, 1976; Unit 2: August 8, 1983
- Construction cost: $4.614 billion (2007 USD)
- Owner: Florida Power & Light
- Operator: Florida Power & Light

Nuclear power station
- Reactor type: PWR
- Reactor supplier: Combustion Engineering
- Cooling source: Atlantic Ocean
- Thermal capacity: 2 × 3020 MW_{th}

Power generation
- Units operational: 2 × 940 MW
- Make and model: CE 2-loop (DRYAMB)
- Nameplate capacity: 1,880 MW
- Capacity factor: 95.29% (2017); 84.05% (lifetime)
- Annual net output: 14,153 GWh (2021)

External links
- Website: St. Lucie Nuclear Plant
- Commons: Related media on Commons

St. Lucie Nuclear Power Plant is a twin nuclear power station located on Hutchinson Island, near Port St. Lucie in St. Lucie County, Florida. Both units are Combustion Engineering pressurized water reactors. Florida Power & Light commissioned Unit 1 in 1976 and Unit 2 in 1983 and continues to operate the station. Minor shares of Unit 2 are owned by the Florida Municipal Power Agency (8.81%) and the Orlando Utilities Commission (6.08%).

The plant contains two nuclear reactors in separate containment buildings, and uses nearby ocean water for cooling.

The construction of Unit 2, in 59 months and for $1.42B (1984 USD), has been cited as being partly due to successful project management. Florida Power & Light created a structure which "consisted of both FPL and Ebasco personnel integrated into one organization".

In 2003 the Nuclear Regulatory Commission (NRC) extended the operating licenses of the St. Lucie units by twenty years, to March 1, 2036 for Unit 1 and April 6, 2043 for Unit 2. In 2021 an application was filed with the NRC for a subsequent 20 year license renewal.

== Extended power update ==
In 2012, Extended Power Update modifications were completed, increasing the electric output from approximately 853 MW to 1,002 MW. The project involved replacing pipes, valves, pumps, heat exchangers, electrical transformers, and generators, some of which were original components of the plant.

== Electricity production ==
Generation (MWh) of St. Lucie Nuclear Power Plant
Year	Jan	Feb	Mar	Apr	May	Jun	Jul	Aug	Sep	Oct	Nov	Dec	Annual (Total)
2001	1,279,964	1,152,193	1,191,863	707,773	1,166,289	1,208,322	1,224,673	1,261,433	1,257,951	1,225,825	1,109,734	651,066	13,437,086
2002	1,257,614	1,132,666	1,277,364	1,270,433	1,226,570	1,260,307	1,226,180	1,258,768	1,170,595	748,035	1,224,764	1,277,141	14,330,437
2003	1,275,678	1,150,578	1,267,927	897,407	634,992	845,616	1,269,451	1,270,333	1,213,963	1,260,749	1,226,294	1,079,016	13,392,004
2004	1,271,564	1,179,471	1,047,578	688,290	1,266,052	1,218,199	1,261,575	1,256,661	459,372	1,114,226	1,219,307	1,123,434	13,105,729
2005	657,658	811,664	1,263,896	1,219,975	1,255,421	1,214,753	1,251,099	1,211,355	1,200,381	839,092	601,381	842,635	12,369,310
2006	1,143,473	1,140,647	1,262,519	1,038,256	636,101	886,443	1,253,609	1,254,528	1,205,302	1,246,023	1,202,625	1,239,695	13,509,221
2007	1,261,653	1,143,553	1,259,140	609,350	676,573	1,210,873	1,248,036	943,668	1,168,004	626,719	616,172	625,754	11,389,495
2008	1,111,351	1,026,980	1,254,363	1,230,022	1,272,167	1,140,516	1,274,735	1,139,404	1,220,223	1,008,012	800,697	1,281,862	13,760,332
2009	1,284,034	1,162,264	1,256,792	1,074,529	638,925	923,915	918,838	1,255,686	790,957	1,245,577	1,222,384	1,280,857	13,054,758
2010	1,268,012	1,163,128	1,232,898	506,871	633,376	648,540	1,115,468	1,107,521	1,162,957	1,268,851	1,237,392	1,285,379	12,630,393
2011	665,606	577,883	637,182	593,443	996,384	1,210,703	1,285,712	1,131,161	1,241,306	1,063,997	1,040,228	664,151	11,107,756
2012	662,475	893,828	645,408	654,923	891,513	1,150,263	1,029,895	791,423	661,022	708,426	790,334	1,379,949	10,259,459
2013	1,504,421	1,358,823	1,030,537	1,428,195	1,469,986	1,327,843	1,497,946	1,487,721	1,393,654	746,636	1,075,620	1,298,529	15,619,911
2014	1,503,609	1,360,573	787,237	858,892	1,494,246	1,417,842	1,336,427	1,353,070	1,419,951	1,479,589	1,303,884	1,502,254	15,817,574
2015	1,506,481	1,237,641	1,252,070	593,003	1,485,412	1,440,480	1,499,099	1,420,471	867,682	847,970	1,431,959	1,492,996	15,075,264
2016	1,493,947	1,409,324	1,497,913	1,449,012	1,490,928	1,432,343	1,481,288	789,413	1,298,258	543,538	1,198,890	1,501,708	15,586,562
2017	1,482,601	957,494	882,240	1,448,133	1,494,814	1,449,325	1,494,275	1,484,117	1,382,972	1,399,853	1,449,723	1,502,373	16,427,920
2018	1,511,420	1,356,200	1,010,416	1,163,105	1,494,768	1,443,949	1,472,587	1,256,690	705,987	1,200,465	1,445,422	1,501,572	15,562,581
2019	1,507,966	1,366,005	1,506,782	1,314,475	745,160	940,204	1,491,455	1,482,733	1,071,040	1,045,921	990,694	1,503,193	14,965,628
2020	1,505,458	1,076,922	1,032,815	1,453,359	1,495,624	1,442,615	1,471,461	1,476,561	1,418,384	1,480,741	1,439,715	1,506,715	16,800,370
2021	1,411,571	1,360,091	1,501,864	935,022	1,061,074	1,439,066	1,481,220	1,373,682	708,539	--	1,441,954	1,439,600	14,153,683
2022	1,131,926	1,352,129	1,488,798	1,440,765	1,489,330	1,410,683	1,475,801	1,478,304	750,791	1,375,940	1,402,500	1,492,818	16,289,785
2023	1,495,043	1,074,270	1,034,279	1,444,507	1,485,557	1,429,982	1,445,283	1,478,483	1,420,496	1,480,388	1,433,522	1,239,626	16,461,436
2024	1,294,660	1,407,137	928,579	1,107,948	1,470,946	1,171,234	1,401,958	1,352,899	709,854	898,172	1,370,889	1,502,157	14,616,433
2025	1,507,401	1,355,094	1,498,754	1,420,513	1,496,021	1,445,442	1,489,968	1,445,495	1,129,156	744,191	1,424,834	1,501,258	16,458,127
2026	1,505,606	1,361,345	1,497,939	1,103,807	737,884	1,179,842	1,474,353	1,417,992					--

== Surrounding population ==
The Nuclear Regulatory Commission defines two emergency planning zones around nuclear power plants: a plume exposure pathway zone with a radius of 10 miles (16 km), concerned primarily with exposure to, and inhalation of, airborne radioactive contamination, and an ingestion pathway zone of about 50 miles (80 km), concerned primarily with ingestion of food and liquid contaminated by radioactivity.

The 2010 U.S. population within 10 miles (16 km) of Saint Lucie was 206,596, an increase of 49.7 percent in a decade, according to an analysis of U.S. Census data for msnbc.com. The 2010 U.S. population within 50 miles (80 km) was 1,271,947, an increase of 37.0 percent since 2000. Cities within 50 miles include Port St. Lucie (7.8 miles to city center), Ft. Pierce (8 miles to city center), Stuart (10.4 miles to city center), and West Palm Beach (42 miles to city center).

== Seismic risk ==
The Nuclear Regulatory Commission's estimate of the risk each year of an earthquake intense enough to cause core damage to the reactor at Saint Lucie was 1 in 21,739, according to an NRC study published in August 2010.

== Hurricane risk ==
In 2016 St. Lucie Power Plant shut down because of Hurricane Matthew. In 2017 the plant did not shut down due to Hurricane Irma.

== Turtle conservation and barrier nets ==
Conservation efforts to promote sea turtles are conducted with federal (National Marine Fisheries Service, NMFS) and state agencies (Florida Fish and Wildlife Conservation Committee, FFWCC ). The plant is granted a marine turtle permit by FFWCC and authorized to conduct turtle activities such as: net capture, tagging, nesting surveys, hand capture, nest relocation, rescue, and release of hatchlings, stranding and salvage activities.

Five species of sea turtles inhabit Florida waters; loggerhead, green, leatherback, hawksbill, and Kemp’s ridley sea turtles. Every year, around 800-950 sea turtles, many juvenile, enter the offshore intake structures, and pass through one of three 12- to 16-foot diameter pipes which run approximately 3/4 mile (3–5 minutes) toward the start of the plant's intake canal. Turtles that enter the canal must be removed manually through a capture program. In 1978, an 8-inch square mesh barrier net was erected east of the A1A bridge to restrict the movement of turtles moving down the canal system towards the plant. A 10-inch UIDS (Underwater intrusion detection system) barrier net was added downstream in the canal near the intake wells. In January 1996, responding to a larger number of small green turtles entering the intake system, a 5-inch square mesh barrier net was added upstream and east of the 8-inch net. Turtles that are captured are documented and returned to the ocean.

== See also ==
- List of power stations in Florida
