= Wellesley Municipal Light Plant =

Town of Wellesley

Wellesley Municipal Light Plant (WMLP)
- Company type: Public
- Industry: Electrical Transmission and Supply
- Founded: 1892
- Headquarters: Wellesley, Massachusetts
- Key people: Richard F. Joyce, Director; Debra J. Healy, Business Manager; Donald H. Newell, Superintendent; Francisco Frias, Supervisory Electrical Engineer; James Verner, Line Supervisor; Peter Bracken, Line Supervisor
- Revenue: US $21,649,000 (2005)
- Net income: US $3,993,475(2006)
- Number of employees: 37 (2007)
- Website: https://www.wellesleyma.gov

The Town of Wellesley Municipal Light Plant (WMLP) is a town department responsible for the transmission and supply of electricity to the residents and businesses in the town of Wellesley, Massachusetts. The headquarters of the WMLP is located at 455 Worcester Street, Wellesley, Massachusetts, and shares its grounds with the Wellesley Fire Department Headquarters and Town of Wellesley Department of Public Works.

The WMLP serves 9,954 customers, of whom 8,812 are residential, 1,138 are commercial, and 4 are industrial. The largest customers (by electric demand) are Wellesley College, Babson College, Harvard Pilgrim, Sun Life Financial, and Wellesley Office Park.

The WMLP holds membership in Northeast Public Power Association (NEPPA), American Public Power Association (APPA), and the Municipal Electric Association of Massachusetts (MEAM Mass). The WMLP has been the recipient of many awards and recognitions. It has received the NEPPA Commitment to Safety Award of 1986 – 1987, an American Public Power Association (APPA) award, and a gold award as a Reliable Public Power Provider in 2007 – 2008, to name a few.

A municipal light plant does not produce electricity on its own. Power reaches the town through substations and transforms high voltage to working home and commercial distribution within a sector. The WMLP has historically had attractive rates compared to other suppliers in the region and has had long-term contracts with major generators. Today, the WMLP works on the national grid purchasing blocks of power under contracts over time. Current power is produced from Niagara Power of Canada and transferred to the US grid. About 80% to 90% of this power is produced via a hydro-electric dams from the Great Lakes and is among the least expensive and cleanest in the US. Subsequently, the electric rates in Wellesley are very cost effective and residents have attractive rates compared to other parts of the region, on a per mil watt cost per household.

== History of the WMLP ==
The Wellesley Municipal Light Plant was founded on December 13, 1892, as the Wellesley Electric Light Division of the Town of Wellesley Department of Public Works. Unlike most municipal light plants at the time, the Town of Wellesley built an entirely new plant for its new electric division instead of buying existing facilities.

In 1892, Wellesley recorded a permanent population of 5,072 citizens. Wellesley Electric Light, however, serviced none of these people. In the beginning, Wellesley Electric Light purchased all of its current from the Natick Gas & Electric Company in neighboring Natick, Massachusetts, and devoted its capabilities exclusively to street lighting. A report from the Massachusetts Commission gives the first record of service to private customers in Wellesley on July 1, 1904, almost twelve years after the foundation of Wellesley Electric Light.

The Edison Electric Illuminating Company of Boston, or Boston Edison (BECo; now NSTAR), operated in Wellesley alongside the Wellesley Electric Light Division. From 1904 until 1906, BECo rendered commercial lighting services in the town. In 1906, Wellesley Electric Light took control of the commercial lighting in the town and has distributed and managed the current for commercial lighting ever since.

Wellesley's proximity to Boston and its strictly suburban feel instigated a population growth that gained intensity after World War II, akin to most other suburbs throughout the United States. As Wellesley's population increased and wealthier people moved into the town, Wellesley's infrastructure and commerce grew rapidly. These changes provided Wellesley Electric Light with more customers and greater revenue.

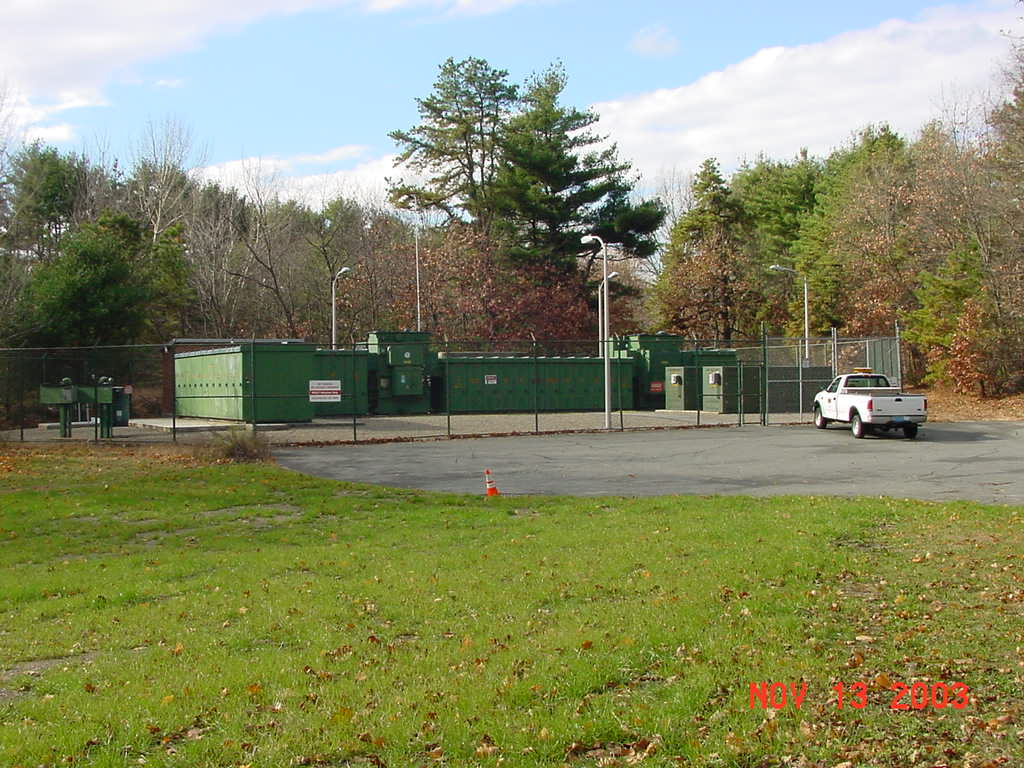
Substation 378 before 2005 reconstruction

With the large amounts of money Wellesley Electric Light was accumulating, the department upgraded and built more of its electrical system with new substations, overhead powerlines, and underground electric lines to support the increasing electric use. In 1959 the substation on Weston Road (Station 378) was completed. This substation was modified in 1970 and completely reconstructed in 2005. In 1967 the substation on Cedar Street (Station 453) was built, and in 1968 a new substation (Station 41) was completed and began distributing power to Wellesley Hills, effectively halting the original substation's use.

Today, the WMLP has a total of 33 distribution lines throughout Wellesley and owns nine supply lines, six from the NSTAR substation in Newton, Massachusetts and three from the NSTAR substation in Needham, Massachusetts. The voltage supplied from the aforementioned substations in Newton and Needham enter Wellesley at 13,800 kV and are either distributed through the town at 13.8 kV or, through the substations and stepdown transformers, distributed at 4 kV.

== Facts about the WMLP ==
The Wellesley Municipal Light Plant utilizes state of the art equipment and maintains a large facility for its machinery and stock.

The WMLP buildings are composed of a garage (which includes an outside transformer and cable yard, stockroom, and linemen's room), a utilities building, a "new" substation (Station 41), and an "old" substation. As of June 2007, the current WMLP garage is scheduled for demolition and a new garage was planned for construction. The "old" substation, which is an historical building dating back to the 1920s is primarily used for storage, while the "new" substation, built in 1968, serves its respective purpose. Aside from the substation on the grounds of the WMLP, it owns two other main substations throughout Wellesley. One of these substations (Station 378) was rebuilt and renovated with new equipment from 2005 to 2006.

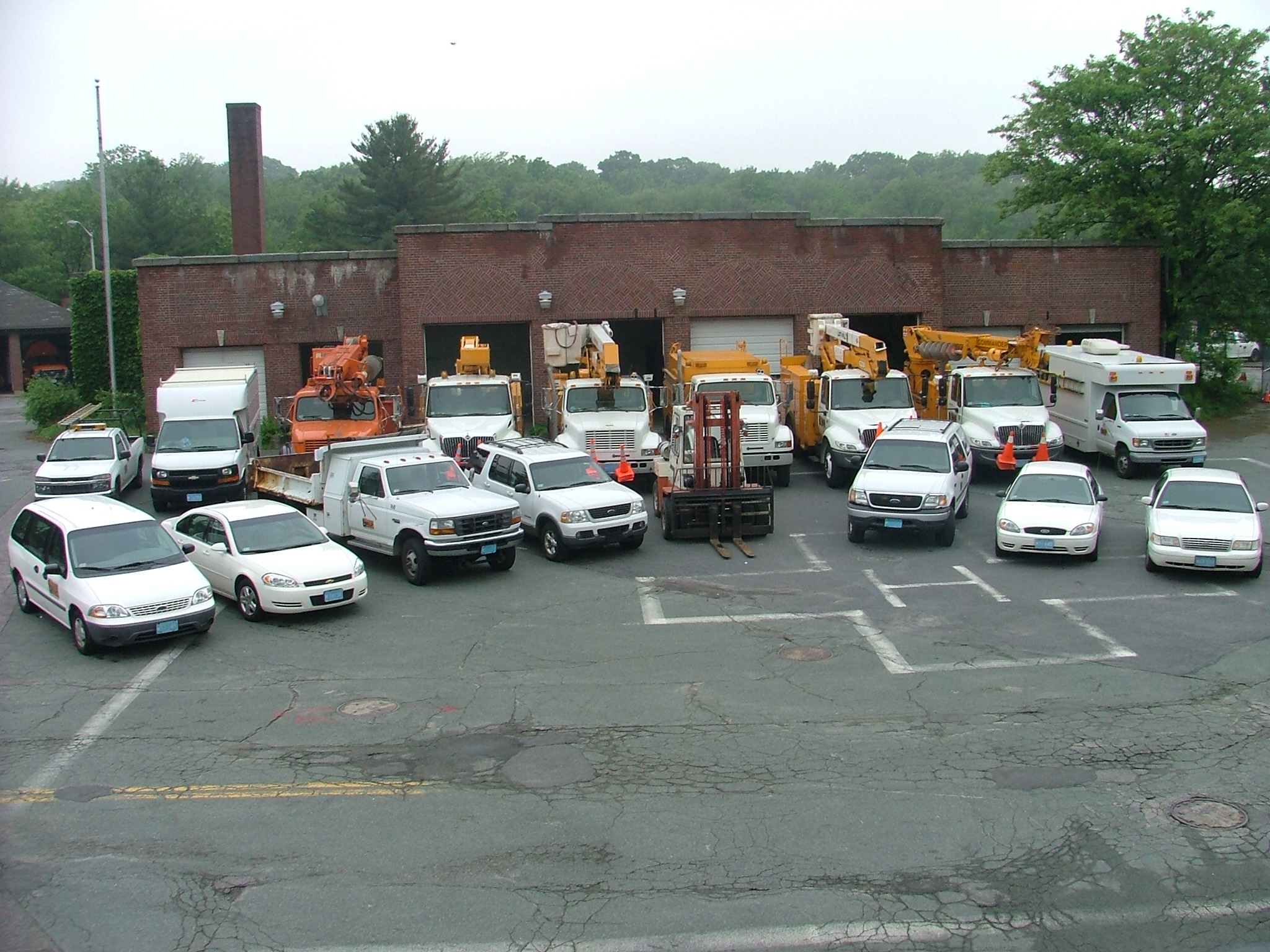
Some of the WMLP fleet

The WMLP fleet consists of 23 vehicles. These vehicles are: two diggers, a forklift, two cable trucks (for underground electric lines), five bucket trucks, an electrician truck, a dump truck, a fire alarm/street light van, a meter reading van, four pickup trucks, and five management vehicles.

The WMLP holds a unique position within the municipality. For more than 100 years, the WMLP was officially a DPW department and known as the Wellesley Electric Light Division. However, in the year of 1994, the WMLP acquired independent town department status within the municipality and is a separate entity from the DPW. The WMLP answers to the Municipal Light Plant Board while the DPW answers to the Board of Public Works.

=== Devens ===
The WMLP services the recently established town of Devens, Massachusetts, located in the Montachusett region in Middlesex County. A large area of the Fort Devens army base was converted into a planned community in the late 1990s. The WMLP is responsible for the electrical supply of the approximately 120 residences and 180 commercial enterprises. The WMLP also maintains supply lines which provide electricity to the remaining Fort Devens military establishment. This contract, however, is complex due to security concerns. The military takes control of the supply lines at a certain point along the system and maintains and operates its own electrical infrastructure within the base.

== Organization of the WMLP ==
The WMLP is a town department, composed of 37 employees working in management, customer service, and electric line work positions.

The WMLP management consists of a director, business manager, superintendent, supervisory electrical engineer, and two line supervisors (one of whom is responsible for Devens). The WMLP also employs an accountant, construction engineer, office assistant, and six customer service representatives. The director of the WMLP is Richard F. Joyce, the business manager is Debra J. Healy, and the superintendent is Donald H. Newell.

The WMLP employs 14 electric line workers. These include three crew leaders, six first class linemen, three second class linemen, one lead cable splicer, and one apprentice lineman. In addition to the line workers, the WMLP employs a lead meter reader, two substation operators, a full-time stockkeeper, a part-time stockkeeper, an engineering technician, a fire alarm/traffic signal specialist, and a Class A electrician.

This information is correct as of July 1, 2007.

== Safety at the WMLP ==
The WMLP retains a good safety record, with streaks of 568 days and 998 days without a work-related injury. The current record of the WMLP is 633 days (as of June 26, 2007). This is a notable feat, as electric line work is rated 8 in the top 10 most dangerous jobs in the United States.

The WMLP makes it mandatory that all of its employees attend frequent safety presentations and that they practice real-world safety operations, both planned and unplanned. In addition to the various safety presentations and demonstrations, the WMLP has a safety committee that meets monthly.

== Miscellaneous facts ==
- The Net Worth of the WMLP is $74,701,176 as of July 2007.
- The WMLP provides broadband services.
- In 2005, kWh sales were 235,275,937.
- The station transformer capacity is 78 Megawatts.
- The WMLP's Peak Demand is 65.076 Megawatts.
- On August 2, 2006, the WMLP hit an all time electric consumption high of 65,076 kW around 4:00PM, as temperatures soared to 102°F.

== Photos ==
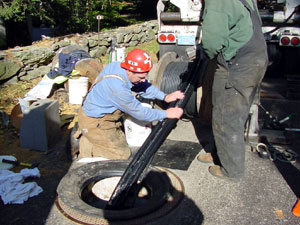
WMLP crews pulling cable into a manhole

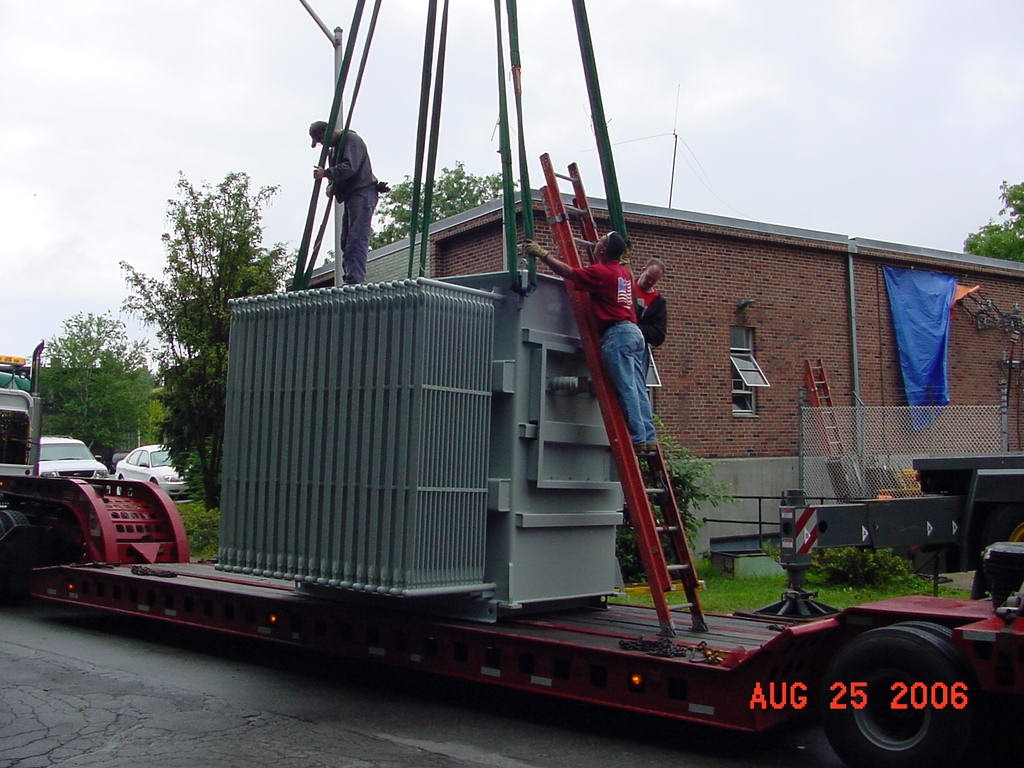
New transformer being delivered to a WMLP substation

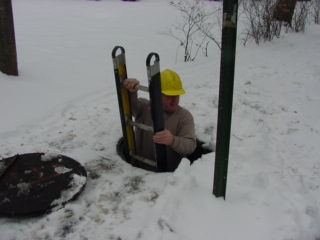
Lineman entering a manhole

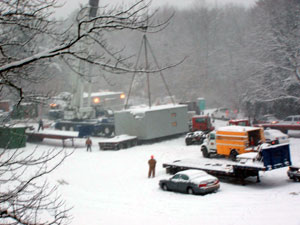
Reconstruction of Substation 378 in the winter

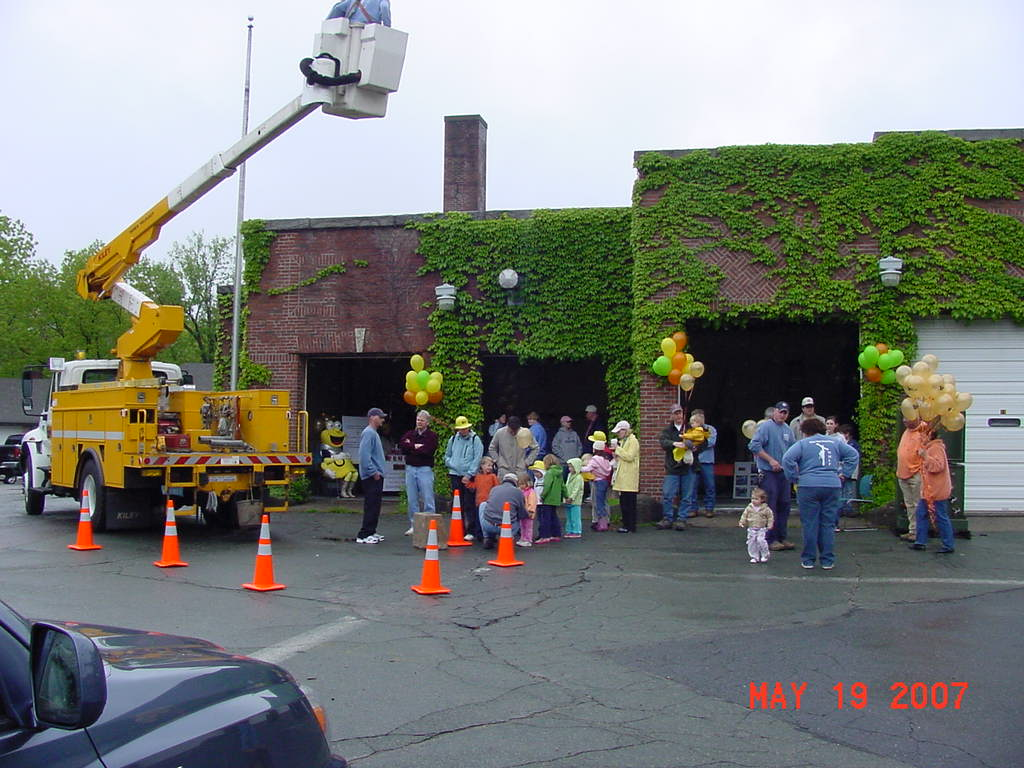
Wellesley's Wonderful Weekend, May 2007

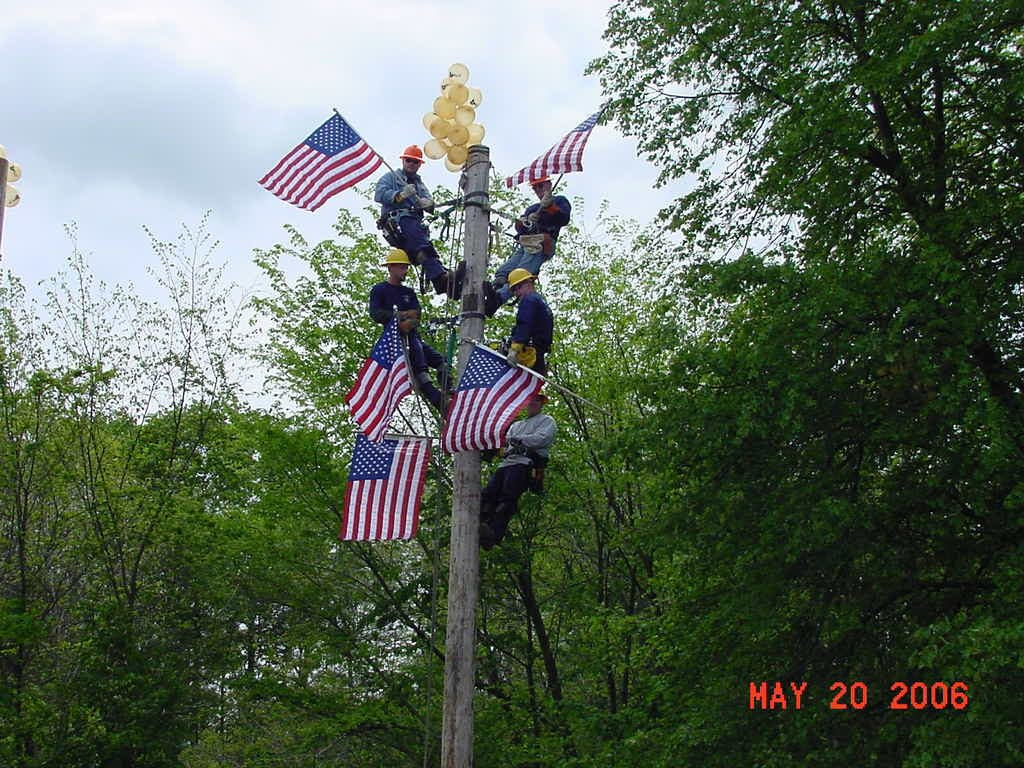
Linemen with American flags
