= Otter Tail Corporation =

American electric power and manufacturing company

- Type: Public
- Traded as: Nasdaq: OTTR; S&P 600 component
- Founded: 1909; 117 years ago
- Headquarters: Fergus Falls, Minnesota
- Number of employees: Approximately 2,500
- Subsidiaries: Otter Tail Power Company, BTD Manufacturing Inc. T.O. Plastics Inc., Northern Pipe Products, Inc., and Vinyltech Corporation
- Website: ottertail.com

Otter Tail Corporation is an electric power and manufacturing company based in Fergus Falls, Minnesota. Its subsidiaries include Otter Tail Power Company, BTD Manufacturing Inc., T.O. Plastics Inc., Northern Pipe Products Inc., and Vinyltech Corporation.

As of 2007, Otter Tail Power Company serves at least 423 towns at retail and delivers power to about 14 municipal utilities. The company currently has a workforce of over 750 employees, a generating capacity of 660 megawatts, and owns over 5,000 miles (8,000 km) of electrical power transmission lines (the majority of which are operated at 41.6 kV). The company serves 128,500 customers in North Dakota, Minnesota, and South Dakota.

== History ==
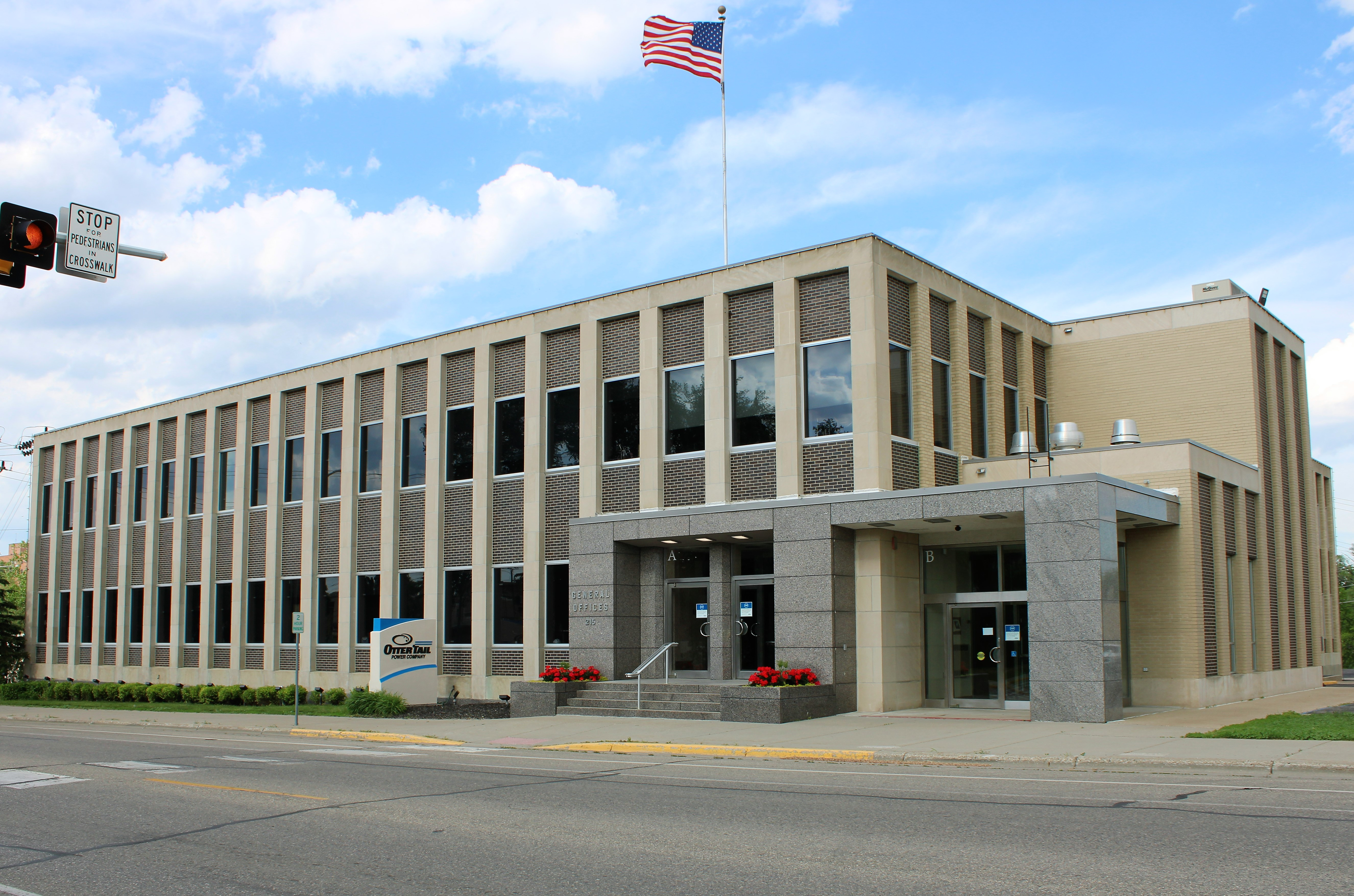
General Offices in Fergus Falls, Minnesota

The company was incorporated in 1907 when funds were secured to begin construction of the Dayton Hollow Dam southwest of Fergus Falls. Once the dam came online in April 1909, the company transmitted power at 22 kV over a 25-mile (40 km) line to serve the customers of the Northern Light Electric Company at Wahpeton, North Dakota.

Shortly thereafter, contracts were secured to provide power at wholesale to the cities of Breckenridge and Fergus Falls, MN (the latter after their own municipal utility's dam failed). After connecting Foxhome, MN, to the system in 1912, the company connected or purchased electric distribution systems in 10 Minnesota towns (the most prominent being Elbow Lake and Morris, MN) and a second town in North Dakota (Fairmount) the following year. Northern Light Electric also merged with Otter Tail at this time and its owner came on board as the company's first general manager. The first South Dakota community served by the company was White Rock in 1915. By 1920, the company was serving approximately 44 towns, all but a handful of which were in or near Otter Tail County. However, the company quickly found its Minnesota service area hemmed in by neighboring utility companies that were also rushing to add territory. This led to the company expanding westward into and across much of eastern North Dakota, reaching Jamestown, ND by 1924 (the company was serving over 100 towns by this time). The company grew at an incredible rate over the next 5 years—reaching the Missouri River at Washburn in 1926 and approaching the Canada–US border by 1928. By the end of the 1920s, the company's service area had tripled to serve more than 310 towns. During the Great Depression, the company was apparently not as badly affected as some of its neighbors but was still forced to focus more on survival than growth. By 1939, the worst was past, and they were ready to move forward once more.

Between 1940 and 1944, Otter Tail added territory by merger or acquisition of 6 smaller power companies within or adjacent to its territory (almost all of which had corporate parents that were required to divest these properties due to passage of the Public Utility Holding Company Act of 1935). These purchases increased its territory to its present size of 50,000 square miles (130,000 km^{2}), about the same size as the state of Wisconsin. The one exception in this territory is the Red River Valley between Grand Forks and Fargo, ND, which was then and still is served by Northern States Power Company (now Xcel Energy).

After the final major acquisition in 1944, the company had reached its 'maximum system' of 496 towns served at both retail and wholesale. As the company matured over the next several decades, the number of towns served within the region would shrink (mainly due to towns served at wholesale changing suppliers and some smaller retail towns dying out). A few towns were added between 1944 and 1968—the largest being the purchase of Fergus Falls' municipal utility in 1953 and the last addition being the transfer of several towns in Polk County, Minnesota, from Northern States Power Company when the 34.5 kV transmission line serving these towns approached its load limit.

A merger with Montana-Dakota Utilities was briefly explored in the late 1960s but was soon dropped due to all the regulatory hurdles involved. By the 1990s, flat revenues from the utility operations led the company to establish a subsidiary (Varistar) to acquire and oversee non-utility businesses. In 2001, the company changed its name to Otter Tail Corporation with the utility becoming a division within the company. In late 2008, the company completed a reorganization to realign the utility operations into a subsidiary within Otter Tail Corporation.

== Hydropower ==
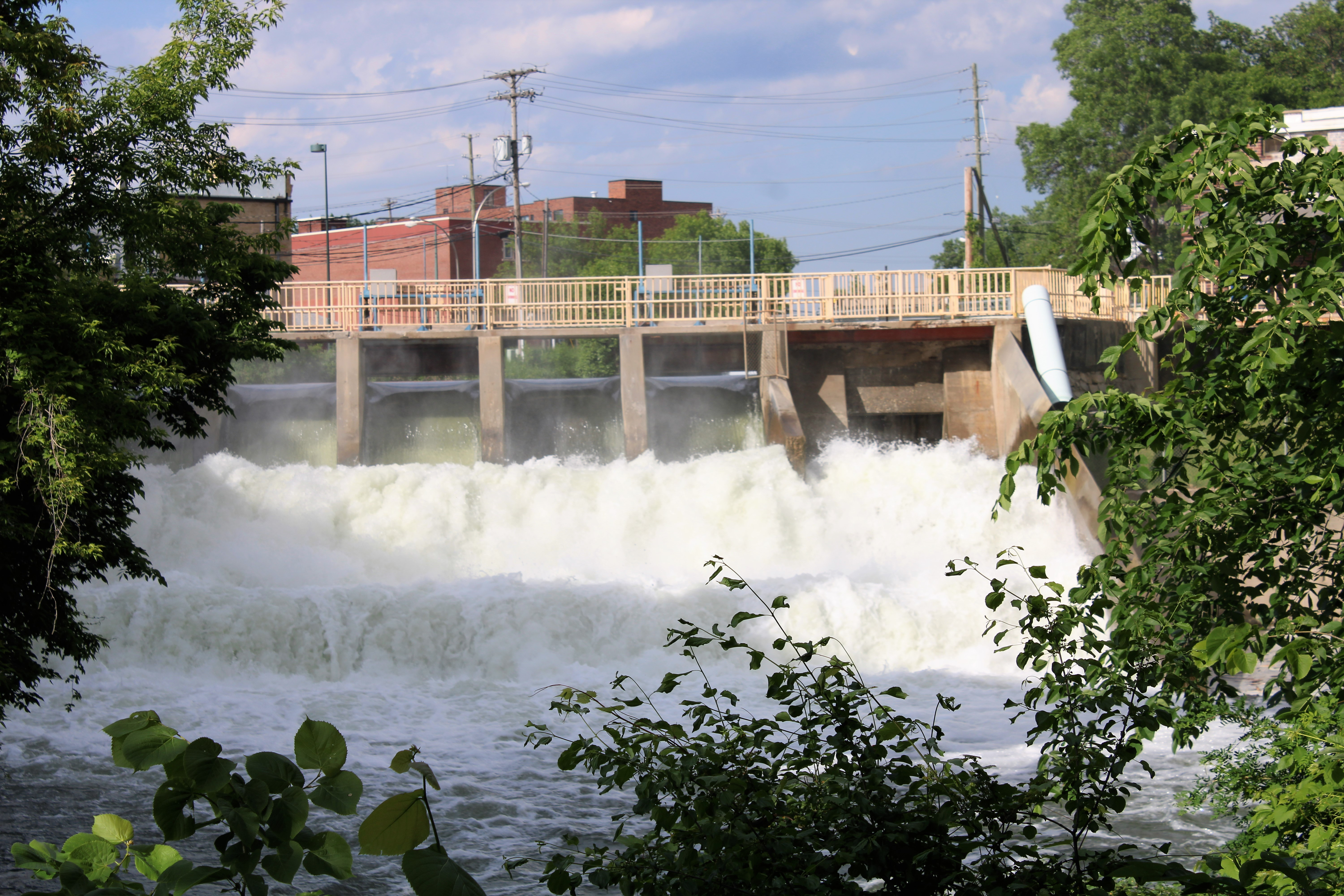
Central-Wright Dam

In the beginning, Otter Tail Power built a series of hydroelectric plants to provide power for its system and these served the company well until its expansion in the 1920s outstripped the dams' capacity (steam provided the bulk of the company's power needs from then on). The company has grown to such a point that today only about 1% of the company's needs still comes from hydropower. The dams are: Dayton Hollow (1909 - southwest of Fergus Falls), Hoot Lake (1914 / 1918 - east Fergus Falls), Pisgah (1918 - west Fergus Falls), Wright (rebuilt 1922 - downtown Fergus Falls), Taplin Gorge (1925 - northeast of Fergus Falls), and Bemidji (built early 1900s / purchased in 1944). Hoot Lake is unique in that the dam also formed the water intake for the coal-fired power plant that once stood nearby. Taplin Gorge's powerhouse is unique in that it was modeled after the Mausoleum of Theodoric at Ravenna, Italy. The company has since removed the Bemidji dam from its generation fleet (due to an equipment failure) but continues to operate the dam to regulate water levels on the lake behind the dam and the river downstream.

== Coal-fired plants ==
After the company's load exceeded the capacity of its dams, the company then switched to coal to meet its energy requirements. A number of plants were added to its system in the 1920s, starting with Hoot Lake in 1921. The most important one was built near Washburn, ND in 1926, as it was one of the earliest large-scale plants to burn lignite exclusively. The company then added several more plants across the system in the late 1940s to meet the huge surge in demand after WWII, but when the company's Big Stone plant was completed in 1974, all of these smaller plants were retired and removed (the Washburn plant had been removed in 1969). The company completed its Coyote plant in 1981, after which another of the company's earlier plants (at Ortonville, MN) was removed. The Hoot Lake plant was the last of the company's early plants and the last that was 100% owned by the company. The plant began as an extension of the Hoot Lake hydro plant, with six additions built between 1921 and 1964. At the time of its retirement and demolition in 2021 (as part of Minnesota's commitment to carbon-free sources of energy), only the two most recent units (built in 1959 and 1964) were still in operation. The company is also seeking to withdraw from its investment in the Coyote plant in western North Dakota.

== Wind power ==
Otter Tail Power Company currently owns 138 MW of wind generation, and purchases an additional 45 MW for a total of 183 MW of wind power. By 2010 wind generation on the system was expected to be equivalent to 18 percent of retail sales. Owned wind resources and power purchase agreements for Otter Tail Power Company include: Luverne Wind Farm, Ashtabula Wind Energy Center, Langdon Wind Energy Center, and North Dakota Wind II.

== See also ==
- List of United States electric companies

== Sources ==
- The Power People: The Story of Otter Tail Power Company (Ralph Johnson, 1986)
