= Wiregrass Electric Cooperative =

American rural electric utility

- Founded: 1939
- Type: Cooperative federation
- Location: Hartford, Alabama, United States
- Region served: Wiregrass Region
- Members: over 27,000
- Owner: member owned
- Key people: Les Moreland, CEO
- Employees: 65
- Website: wiregrass.coop

Wiregrass Electric Cooperative is an American not-for-profit rural electric utility cooperative headquartered in Hartford, Alabama. It is a member of the Alabama Rural Electric Association of Cooperatives (AREA) and the National Rural Electric Cooperative Association.

== History ==
Wiregrass Electric Cooperative was organized in October 1939 and began distribution in 1940. Taking its name from the Wiregrass Region which it serves, it was created to serve rural customers not serviced by the large power companies. The system is made up of around 3,200 miles of line and more than 27,000 consumer/member homes and businesses.

Howard Haygood was the first manager of the cooperative. He served until 1958. Subsequent leadership was as follows: • B.L Woodham, general manager, 1953 – 1968 • Bruce Dyess, general manager, 1969 – 1985 • Jerry Mosley, general manager, 1985 – 2005 • Michael McWaters, CEO, 2005 – 2013 • Les Moreland, CEO, 2014 – present

== Organization ==
At Wiregrass Electric Cooperative, the consumer/member is the basis of the organization. Each person receiving electric service must be a member of the cooperative. Annual membership meetings are held where members receive reports on the operation of the system and elect trustees to handle the affairs of the organization.

Nine members compose the board of trustees at Wiregrass Electric Cooperative. These people must be members of the cooperative to be eligible to serve. The service area is divided into 9 districts, and the elected trustee must reside within the district he or she is to represent.

These trustees, as a board, decide the policies under which the cooperative must operate. The board is responsible for the hiring of a chief executive officer. This CEO reports to, and is directly responsible to, the board of trustees. He must operate the system within the framework of policies set forth by the board.

The Chief Executive Officer of Wiregrass Electric Cooperative known as the CEO, he hires and directs all of the employees of the local cooperative. Employees report to their department heads, who report to senior staff members, who in turn report to the CEO.

The cooperative's service area covers most of the rural areas of Houston and Geneva counties. The cooperative also serves portions of Dale, Coffee and Covington counties.

The main office of the cooperative is located on Highway 167 in Hartford. All records are kept at this location. In addition to the headquarters, the cooperative operates customer service centers in Ashford, Dothan and Samson. These offices are full-service locations where members can pay bills, apply for service, report problems with their account or conduct any other routine business that is normally handled by the main office.

Since the cost of wholesale power is the biggest portion of its expenditures, Wiregrass Electric Cooperative diligently looks for ways to reduce power expenses.

Through a power supply pooling arrangement, PowerSouth Energy Cooperative, the power supplier owned by WEC and 21 other member systems in central and south Alabama and the Florida panhandle, initiated a power supply plan that could reduce wholesale power expenses and ensure the future stability of rates. Under this arrangement, PowerSouth will be responsible for supplying the electricity, which will continue to be delivered over Alabama Power Company's transmission system

== Power companies in Alabama ==
There are 22 rural electric cooperatives that distribute electricity in Alabama. All of these are organized locally as separate cooperatives with their own membership, boards of trustees, management and employees. Policies, rates and provisions of service differ among each cooperative.

Nineteen of these 22 distribution co-ops and the one G&T co-op have banded together to organize the Alabama Rural Electric Association of Cooperatives (AREA). This is more commonly referred to as the Statewide Association. As an association, AREA is funded by the member cooperatives through a dues structure.

The statewide association, or AREA, is controlled by a board of directors. The board is composed of the manager and one trustee from each of the member cooperatives. The board employs the manager or CEO who, in turn, hires and directs other employees.

This association also performs various services for the member cooperatives. It works closely with the legislature and other state agencies on matters that affect all co-ops in Alabama. It produces the Alabama Living magazine mailed to all rural electric consumer/members. It also operates a print shop for custom printing required by its member co-ops.

There are more than 1 million rural electric consumers in Alabama. These consumers use approximately 1,200 kilowatt hours per month. There are approximately 6.5 consumers per mile of line on Alabama cooperatives.

Currently, Wiregrass system is made up of more the 3,074 miles of lines and serves more than 27,000 members in portions of five counties, including Houston, Geneva, Dale, Coffee, and Covington.

== See also ==
- West Florida Electric Cooperative
