= West Florida Electric Cooperative =

West Florida Electric Cooperative, Inc. (WFEC) is a not-for-profit rural electric utility cooperative headquartered in Graceville, Florida. It is a member of the Florida Electric Cooperatives Association, the National Rural Electric Association, PowerSouth Energy Cooperative and the Touchstone Energy Cooperatives alliance.

== History ==
President Franklin D. Roosevelt established the Rural Electrification Administration (REA) in 1935 by signing Executive Order 7037 to bring electricity to rural areas of the country and to customers not serviced by the large power companies. West Florida Electric Cooperative was organized in 1937 and began distributing electricity in 1939. William Walter Henley served as WFEC's first Board of Directors' President.

Since 1937, WFEC has continued to grow and expand. In 1977, WFEC bought Sportsman's Park, home field of the Graceville Oilers baseball team of the Alabama–Florida League (AFL) and converted it into a pole yard. District offices were opened in Bonifay and Sneads in 1986 and 1988 to meet the needs of West Florida's growing customer base.

== Operations ==
PowerSouth Energy Cooperative, formerly Alabama Electric Cooperative, is WFEC's generation and transmission co-op (G&T). This means that West Florida purchases the power it distributes to its members from PowerSouth. As a member of PowerSouth, WFEC is an owner of the cooperative along with fifteen other electric cooperatives and four municipal electric systems in Alabama and Northwest Florida. PowerSouth's members are: Baldwin EMC; Central Alabama EC; CHELCO; Clarke-Washington EMC; Coosa Valley EC; Covington EC; Dixie EC; Escambia River EC; Gulf Coast EC; Pea River EC; Pioneer EC; South Alabama EC; Southern Pine EC; Tallapoosa River EC; Wiregrass EC; The Utilities Board of the City of Andalusia, Ala; The City of Brundidge, Ala; Water Works & Electric Board of the City of Elba, Ala; and Utilities Board of the City of Opp, Ala. In 1998, WFEC joined the Touchstone Energy Cooperatives’ branding alliance to pools its resources and knowledge with other co-ops from across the U.S.

Currently, West Florida Electric serves more than 27,000 customers in portions of four counties, including Jackson, Calhoun, Holmes & Washington in Northwest Florida.

== Other ==
During 2005, West Florida Electric partnered with the Cooperative Research Network (CRN) and the National Rural Telecommunications Cooperative (NRTC) to study Broadband over power lines (BPL) technology. The trial was to evaluate if BPL worked, how much data it carried, how far and how easy/difficult the technology was to set up. The BPL demonstrations took place on a stretch of medium-voltage overhead power lines at Southern Maryland Electric Cooperative (SMECO) and at WFEC.

In 2007, WFEC began converting its metering system to automated meter reading or AMR. AMR technology helps the cooperative in a variety of ways including reducing outage response times, outage verification, providing timely date for customers and early detection of problems and voltage monitoring.

== See also ==
- Electric cooperatives
- Touchstone Energy
- Wiregrass EC
- Automatic meter reading
- Broadband over power lines (BPL)
- BPL Deployments
