= EnergyUnited =

EnergyUnited, based in Statesville, North Carolina, is the largest electric cooperative in North Carolina, serving nearly 125,000 metering points and 105,000 members. It was formed in 1998 by the merger of Crescent Electric Membership Corporation and Davidson Electric Membership Corporation.

== History ==
=== EnergyUnited ===
On October 1, 1998, Crescent Electric Membership Corp. and Davidson Electric Membership Corp. merged, and the combined utility EnergyUnited Electric Membership Corp. had almost 90,000 customers in 18 North Carolina counties. The company considered around 700 names, including Metrolina and Triad, but the name EnergyUnited reflected the possibility the company would diversify into other areas. Crescent executive vice president R.B. Sloan, Jr., an employee since 1973, became the chief executive officer, while Wayne Wilkins, Davidson executive vice president and an employee since 1971, became chief operating officer. The new company was North Carolina's largest electric cooperative, and seventh out of almost one thousand cooperatives in the country. The small number of customers in areas typically served by cooperatives meant higher power bills than those for investor-owned companies, but the territory of EnergyUnited included fast-growing areas which would have many customers, and bills would be lower as a result. EnergyUnited promised rates would drop five percent. No jobs were lost and no offices closed, though the company projected $38 million in savings over ten years.

In 1999, EnergyUnited began offering Internet services through EnergyUnited Internet, Inc., a for-profit company.

In 2000, as the result of a new state law, EnergyUnited paid $20 million for most of the N.C. operation of All Star Gas, a propane distributor. David Meacham became the head of the propane subsidiary. Also that year, EnergyUnited began offering security services under the HomeVantage brand, including security systems and carbon monoxide detectors.

In 2001, EnergyUnited began selling long distance telephone service. Along with LecStar Telecom of Atlanta, the company expanded that service to the entire state in 2003, when EnergyUnited had 4500 telephone customers.

On November 12, 2010, EnergyUnited officially debuted a solar farm in the Taylorsville area, generating enough power for 150-200 homes. The $6 million project was a joint effort with SunEdison, but Duke Energy took over, and EnergyUnited will buy the solar power from Duke. The company also purchased electricity from a biomass plant at Iredell County's landfill which generated enough power for 3000 homes.

=== Crescent Electric ===
Based in Statesville, North Carolina, Crescent Electric Membership Corp. was created in 1971 by the merger of Cornelius Electric Membership Corp., with 6000 customers, and Davie Electric Membership Corporation, with 12,000. In 1998 Crescent had over 53,000 customers in Alexander, Cabarrus, Catawba, Davie, Gaston, Iredell, Lincoln, Mecklenburg, Rowan, Wilkes and Yadkin counties.

=== Davidson Electric ===
Based in Lexington, North Carolina, Davidson Electric Membership Corp. had over 36,000 customers in Davidson, Davie, Forsyth, Guilford, Montgomery, Randolph, Rockingham and Stokes counties.
