= KVA =

KVA may refer to:

- Kavala International Airport (IATA code: KVA), an airport located in the municipality of Nestos, in Greece
- Korea Volleyball Association, the governing body for volleyball in South Korea
- KVA, a fictional terrorist group in the 2014 first-person shooter video game Call of Duty: Advanced Warfare
- KVA, an X-Value Adjustment for regulatory capital
- Royal Swedish Academy of Sciences (Swedish: Kungliga Vetenskapsakademien), one of the royal academies of Sweden
- kVA, a kilovolt-ampere
