= O'Brien Cogeneration =

- Type: Incorporation
- Industry: Energy Resources
- Headquarters: United States

O'Brien Cogeneration Inc. is an energy resources industrial company in the United States, which is involved with construction and operation of generation of electrical power from renewable energy technology.

== Company ==
In 2005, O'Brien Cogeneration received one of the highest civil damage awards in the US for that year. In particular the Essex County Superior Court rendered a judgment award in the amount of $32,320,360 against Hawker Siddeley for a cause of negligent maintenance, resulting in extensive plant damage and business disruption. The lead plaintiff attorney in this case was Michael J. Izzo Jr., of the firm of Cozen O'Connor, Cherry Hill, New Jersey.

Significant quantities of air pollutants are emitted from each plant, although considerable resources are expended in applying Best Available Control Technology. For example, in the city of Philadelphia, O'Brien Cogeneration operates two separate plants that emit a total of approximately 17,000 pounds per year of air pollutants, making O'Brien a medium size industrial emitter in that city; in Philadelphia a total of six discrete chemical air pollutants are recognised, and a total of twelve distinct stack sources are present.

While O'Brien Cogeneration began as an East Coast firm, in the late 1980s it expanded to California with planning of a new facility in Salinas, California. This plant review included detailed sub-studies in air quality, noise pollution, risk assessment and wastewater reclamation to meet requirements of the California Environmental Quality Act. The Earth Metrics study found, in particular, that requirements of the Monterey Bay Unified Air Pollution Control District would be met by the proposed facility design.

O'Brien Cogenaration has been involved in the U.S. Environmental Protection Agency's program involving innovations in economic incentives to control environmental pollution.

== See also ==
- Air pollution
- Alternative fuel
