= Reedy Creek Energy Services =

American utility company

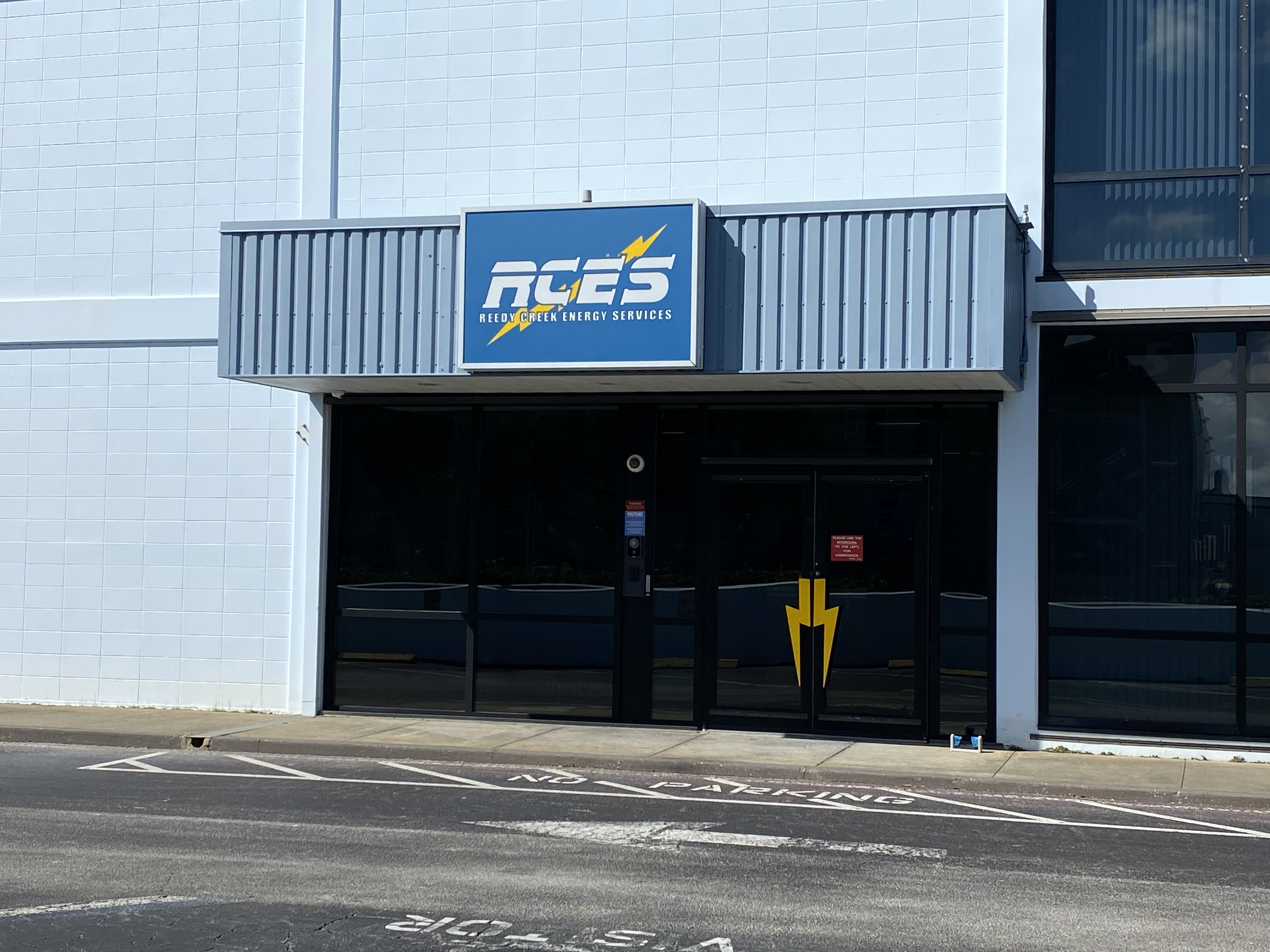
- Reedy Creek Energy Services power plant located north of the Magic Kingdom.
- Type: Subsidiary
- Industry: Energy
- Founded: 1971
- Area served: Walt Disney World
- Key people: Christine Ferraro (Director)
- Parent: Disney Experiences (The Walt Disney Company)

Reedy Creek Energy Services (RCES) is a wholly owned subsidiary of The Walt Disney Company. It operates the electric and other utility transmission and distribution systems of the Central Florida Tourism Oversight District (CFTOD) on behalf of the district which specifically covers Walt Disney World outside Orlando, Florida. Some power is produced by the district-owned power plant north of the Magic Kingdom with the remainder purchased from the public power grid. RCES also handles all public services and public works for the CFTOD including water, natural gas, roadway maintenance, waste and recycling, sewage and wastewater treatment. Officially the utility distribution systems are owned by the district entity itself and the district contracts with RCES to operate the systems.

== Images ==
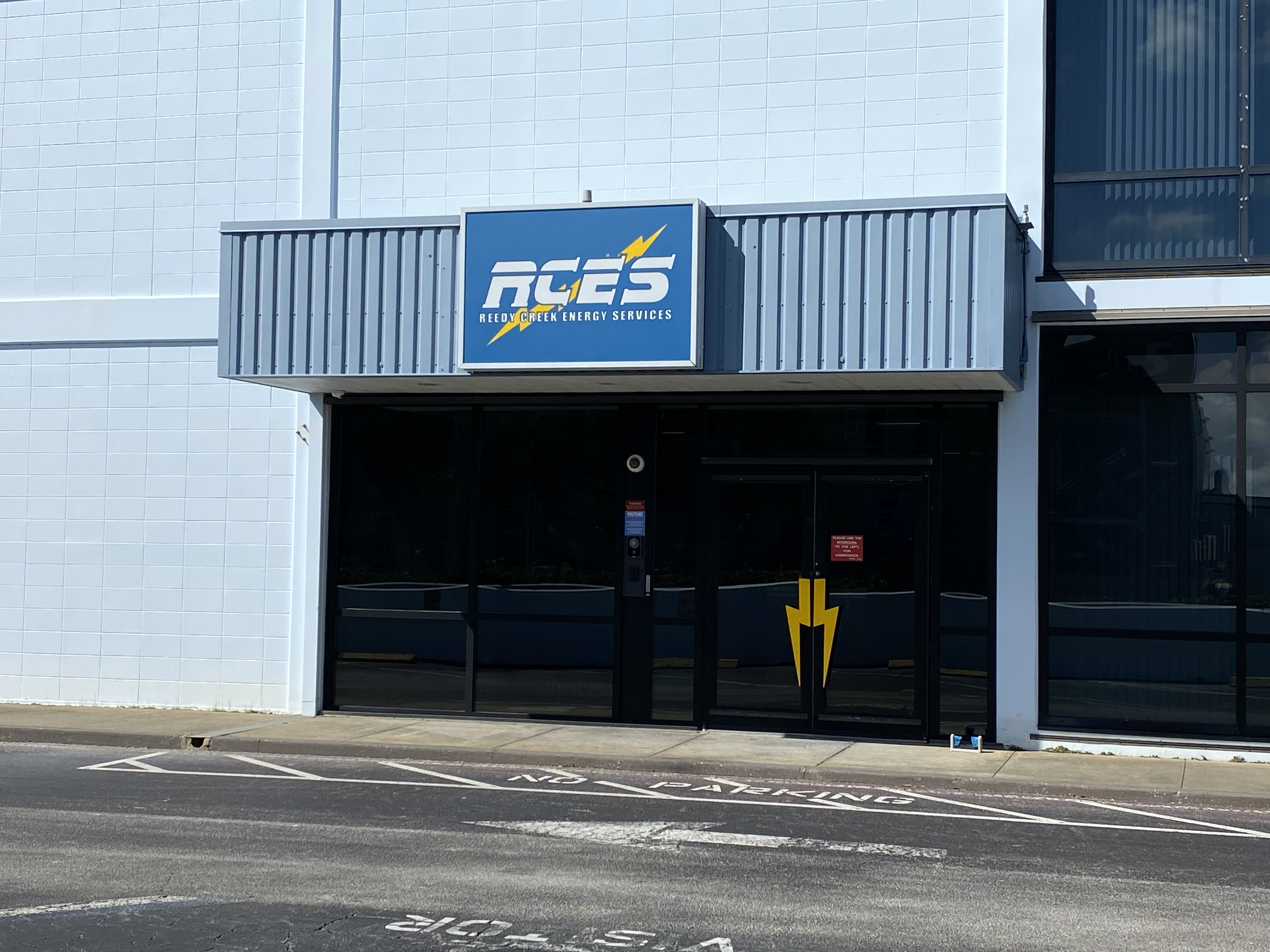
Reedy Creek Energy Services power plant located north of the Magic Kingdom

Mickey pylon, used to transmit RCES's subcontracted power from TECO Energy into the CFTOD.
