= American Public Power Association =

- Type: Trade association
- Industry: Electric power industry
- Founded: 1940
- Headquarters: Crystal City, Virginia, U.S.
- Key people: Scott Corwin, CEO and President
- Website: publicpower.org

The American Public Power Association (APPA) is the service organization for approximately 2,000 U.S. community-owned electric utilities that serve more than 55 million Americans.

== History ==
APPA was created in September 1940 to represent the common interests of these utilities. Today, APPA's purpose is to advance the public policy interests of its members and their consumers and provide member services to ensure adequate, reliable electricity at a reasonable price with the proper protection of the environment.

Regular APPA membership is open to U.S. public power utilities, joint action agencies (state and regional consortia of public power utilities), rural electric cooperatives, Canadian municipal/provincial utilities, public power systems within U.S. territories and possessions, and state, regional, and local associations in the United States and Canada that have purposes similar to APPA. Members include Los Angeles Department of Water and Power, New York Power Authority, Long Island Power Authority, Salt River Project in Arizona, Sacramento Municipal Utility District, JEA in Florida, and Seattle City Light.

APPA also encourages associate memberships from entities and individuals that have an interest in doing business with public power, and from cities and towns exploring the possibility of establishing public power systems.

== Activities ==
- APPA is the national advocate for public power in Washington, D.C., on legislative and regulatory issues, and in legal proceedings. APPA lobbies public power positions, and monitors and reports on federal events and activities. Its Legislative & Resolutions Committee gives all utility members an opportunity to develop consensus on issues, as do task forces, committees, and work groups. The annual Legislative Rally brings managers and policymakers to Washington, D.C., to tell the public power story.
- APPA provides programs and resources to help utilities adopt new technologies and improve customer service, reliability, safety, physical and cybersecurity, and disaster preparation efforts through programs such as the eReliability Tracker, the APPA Safety Manual, and the Reliable Public Power Provider certification program.
- Public Power magazine and Public Power Current newsletter are sources of information about public power and the industry. APPA’s website provides information for a variety of audiences. Specialized publications, reports, surveys, and Internet-based networking groups inform and educate in various utility disciplines.
- APPA offers many opportunities to learn from and network with colleagues, utility experts, and local and national policymakers. The annual National Conference is the largest public power meeting. Other annual meetings cover business and financial, engineering and operations, legal, community broadband, and customer and community services topics. APPA also conducts smaller professional-development courses and provides a variety of continuing education and consumer-oriented materials.
- The Demonstration of Energy-Efficient Developments (DEED) program provides grants to APPA-member utilities and students from public power communities. Projects explore techniques and technologies that could be widely applicable to public power.
- Major awards are given at APPA's National Conference to executives and policymakers who have advanced public power's goals, as well as to utilities that have met the highest standards. Throughout the year, others are recognized for safety records, reliability, annual reports, lineworker skills, continuing education, and dedication to energy innovation.
