= Orlando Utilities Commission =

Public utility company in Florida, US

Orlando Utilities Commission logo

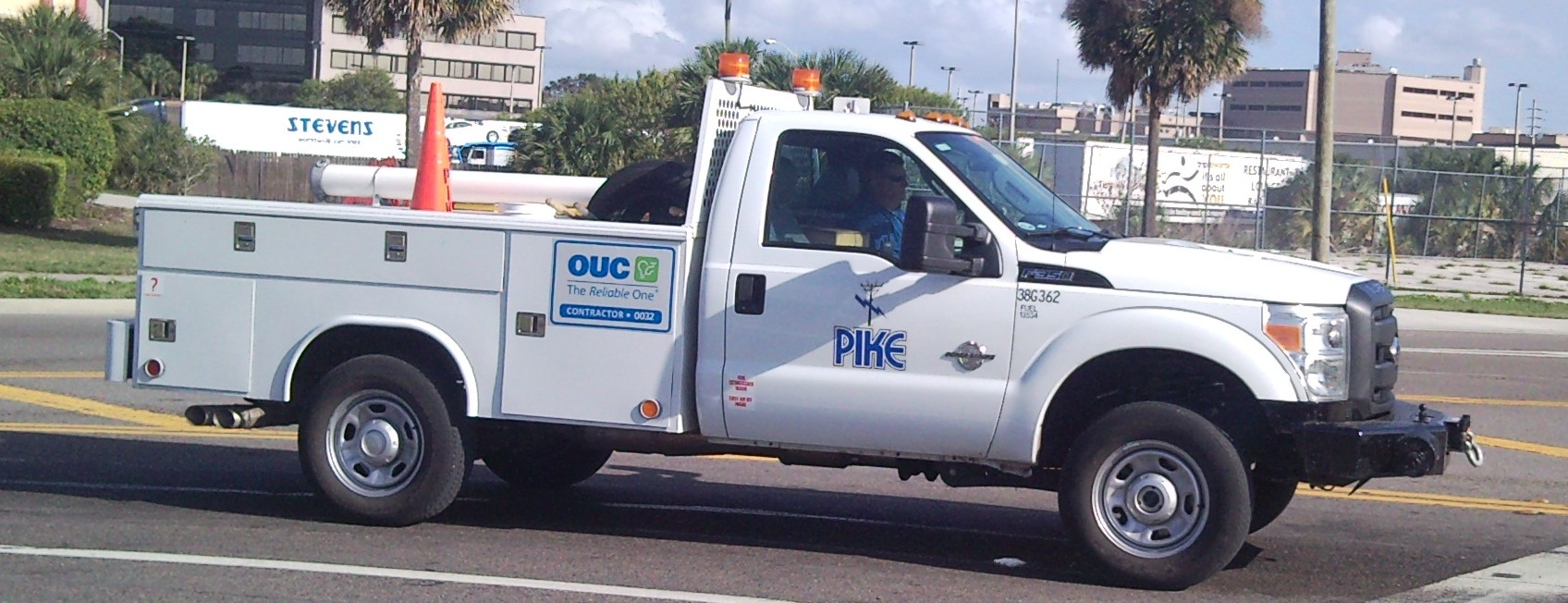
A Ford F-350 Super Duty from Pike Electric Corporation, a contractor for the OUC.

The Orlando Utilities Commission (OUC: "The Reliable One") is a municipally owned public utility providing water and electric service to the citizens of Orlando, Florida and portions of adjacent unincorporated areas of Orange County, as well as St. Cloud, Florida, in Osceola County.

Established in 1923 by a special act of the Florida Legislature, OUC is the second largest municipal utility in Florida and 14th largest municipal in the country. OUC provides electric, water, chilled water and/or lighting services to more than 240,000 customers.

OUC owns and operates the Curtis H. Stanton Energy Center in east Orange County. The most diverse generating site in the state – natural gas, landfill methane gas, coal and solar are on the 3,280 acre property which can generate more than 1,800 megawatts of electricity. OUC also owns the Indian River Plant near Cocoa, a 40 percent ownership of Lakeland Electric’s McIntosh Unit 3 in Lakeland, and a 6 percent stake of the St. Lucie Nuclear Power Plant near Ft. Pierce. The company is governed by a five-member commission (including the Mayor of Orlando), which is responsible for all operating policies.

OUC also owns and operates seven water plants and a distribution network of more than 1,700 miles of pipe. OUC's water is pumped from the Lower Floridan Aquifer and treated with ozone to reduce the need for other chemicals.
