= PowerSouth Energy Cooperative =

- Formerly: Alabama Electric Cooperative
- Headquarters: Andalusia, Alabama, United States
- Website: powersouth.com

PowerSouth Energy Cooperative is an electrical Generation and Transmission (G&T) cooperative based in Andalusia, Alabama, providing wholesale power to 16 electric distribution cooperatives and four municipal systems in Alabama and northwest Florida. PowerSouth was founded as Alabama Electric Cooperative (AEC) in 1941 and changed its name to PowerSouth in 2008. The cooperative operates one of very rare salt cavern-based compressed-air energy storage installations.
