= Kissimmee Utility Authority =

Kissimmee Utility Authority (KUA) is a municipally owned electric utility founded in 1901 and serving Osceola County, Florida. It is Florida's sixth-largest municipally owned utility, providing electric services to approximately 97,000 customers.

== Overview ==
KUA owns, operates, and manages the municipal electric system established by the City of Kissimmee, Florida. The utility is known for its commitment to reliable service and community engagement. KUA operates and jointly owns the Cane Island Power Park and has ownership interests in other generating stations, including coal, natural gas, and nuclear sources.

Kissimmee's management of an electric system began on June 28th, 1901, when the Kissimmee City Council passed a resolution authorizing the city’s purchase of the Kissimmee Electric Light Company from W.C. Maynard for $4,293.59. Maynard, a resident of Kissimmee, had been operating the private power company under contract with the city since December 4, 1900. After the purchase, the council appointed a committee to manage the electric system.

While the City of Kissimmee has managed the electric system since 1901, it wasn't until October 1st, 1985 that the Kissimmee Utility Authority was created by city charter. Ordinance no. 1285 was adopted by the City Commission on Feb. 19th, 1985, and ratified at referendum March 26th, 1985 by a 2 to 1 vote, becoming effective October 1st, 1985.

The utility’s first purchase was a 15-kilowatt generator in 1901, which was sufficient to power 150 100-watt lightbulbs or 13 coffeemakers. In the 1920s, KUA expanded by adding three diesel generators to serve approximately 200 electric customers in Kissimmee.

Not until the opening of Walt Disney World in the 1970's did the utility begin experiencing tremendous customer and energy demand growth.

In addition to electric services, KUA provides billing for refuse and stormwater services for Kissimmee.

== Governance and management ==
=== Board of directors ===
KUA is governed by a five-member board of directors appointed by the Kissimmee City Commission for staggered five-year terms. The mayor of Kissimmee serves as an ex officio member. As of January 2024, the board members include:

- Manny Ortega, Chairman
- Rae Hemphill, Vice Chairman
- Ethel Urbina, Secretary
- Reginald Hardee, Assistant Secretary
- Melissa Thacker, Director
- Jackie Espinosa, Mayor of Kissimmee (ex officio member)

=== Executive management ===
The board selects a president and general manager who is responsible for day-to-day operations of the utility. Key executive positions include:

- Brian Horton, president and general manager

== Operations ==
=== Power generation ===
KUA operates and jointly owns the Cane Island Power Park, which consists of four generating units with a combined capacity of 740 megawatts. The utility also has ownership interests in other generating stations, including coal, natural gas, and nuclear sources, to ensure a diverse and reliable power supply.

=== Service area ===
KUA serves approximately 97,000 customers in Osceola County, Florida, including the cities of Kissimmee and St. Cloud, as well as parts of unincorporated Osceola County.

=== Budget ===
In July 2024, the KUA board of directors approved a $293 million operating and capital budget for the 2025 fiscal year.

== Community engagement ==
KUA is actively involved in the community it serves. The utility offers various programs and initiatives, including:

- Energy conservation programs
- Educational outreach
- Community sponsorships and events
- Customer assistance programs

== Historical events ==
=== 2004 hurricane season ===
In 2004, KUA faced significant challenges when three major hurricanes struck its service area:

- Hurricane Charley caused a loss of electric service to 100% of KUA customers.
- Hurricane Frances affected 36% of customers.
- Hurricane Jeanne impacted 59% of customers.

KUA workers worked extensively to restore power, logging 16-hour days to repair damage and restore electricity.

=== Post-hurricane evaluation ===
Following the 2004 hurricane season, KUA implemented several measures to improve its storm preparedness and response capabilities. These included:

- Strengthening infrastructure
- Enhancing emergency response plans
- Improving communication systems
- Increasing coordination with local and state agencies

== Awards and recognition ==
KUA has received numerous awards for its service, reliability, and community engagement. Some notable recognitions include:

- "Top Power Plant" by POWER Magazine for 2022.
- "Top Workplaces" Award by Orlando Sentinel 2024.
- Safety Award by Florida Municipal Electric Association (FMEA) 2024.
- American Public Power Association Diamond Level Safety Award of Excellence for safe operating practices in 2024.
- American Public Power Association's Reliable Public Power Provider (RP3) designation
- Florida Municipal Electric Association's Safety Award
- Various environmental stewardship awards

== See also ==
- List of United States electric companies
- Public utility
