= Reynolds-Davis Grocery Company =

Former grocery market

- Defunct: 1955
- Headquarters: Fort Smith, Arkansas, United States

The Reynolds-Davis Grocery Company was a wholesale grocery business based in Fort Smith, Arkansas. The company operated from a five-story building at Garrison Avenue from 1907 to 1955. In 1996, much of the building was destroyed by a tornado, but its facade was preserved. A historical marker was erected at the site in 2012.

== History ==
The Reynolds-Davis Grocery Company originated as a wholesale grocery business established by F. T. Reynolds in Fort Smith, Arkansas. The business initially operated on Garrison Avenue between Fourth and Fifth Streets before moving to Second Street. In January 1904, it relocated to a building on Garrison Avenue. The firm later became the Reynolds-Foster Company following a partnership between Reynolds and Josiah Foster. After the partnership dissolved, Reynolds partnered with F. R. Davis, and the business became known as Reynolds-Davis and Company. On October 16, 1910, it consolidated with the Fort Smith Wholesale Grocery Company and adopted the name Reynolds-Davis Grocery Company.

Reynolds Davis Grocery Company Centerpiece.

The company operated from a five-story building at 300 Garrison Avenue from 1907 to 1955. The building later housed Checker Transfer & Storage Company and other tenants. A tornado struck downtown Fort Smith on April 21, 1996, destroying much of the building. Its building first floor facade was preserved after the tornado. In 2012, a historical marker was erected at the site by Griffin Properties of Fort Smith, LLC.

=== Legal cases ===
The Reynolds-Davis Grocery Company brought an action against the Missouri Pacific Railroad Company to recover damages for sugar lost during an interstate shipment from Louisiana to Fort Smith. In December 1923, the Arkansas Supreme Court affirmed a judgment in the grocery company's favour.

In 1925, the United States Supreme Court affirmed a judgment in favour of Reynolds-Davis Grocery Company in a case involving the loss of part of a carload of sugar shipped from Raceland, Louisiana, to Fort Smith, Arkansas. The Court held Missouri Pacific Railroad liable as the delivering carrier, although the loss occurred while the shipment was in the possession of the St. Louis–San Francisco Railroad, which had been employed to switch the car to the company's warehouse.
