= F. T. Reynolds =

American wholesale grocery

- Born: March 1844; Maryland, U.S.
- Died: January 26, 1927 (aged 82); Fort Smith, Arkansas, U.S.
- Other names: Thad Reynolds; Francis T. Reynolds
- Occupation: Wholesale grocer
- Spouse: Josephine Louise Kelly
- Children: 3 sons, 1 daughter

F. T. Reynolds, also known as Thad Reynolds (March 1844 – January 26, 1927), was an American wholesale grocer and businessman in Fort Smith, Arkansas. He founded a wholesale grocery business that later became the Reynolds-Davis Grocery Company, one of the city's wholesale grocery firms.

== Early life and career ==
Reynolds was born in Maryland in March 1844. After the American Civil War, he moved to Mobile, Alabama. He later moved to Bentonville, Arkansas, where he and his brother, W. W. Reynolds, operated a general mercantile business and a tobacco manufacturing plant.

In 1871, Reynolds became a traveling representative for Shyrock and Rowling, a wholesale grocery firm in St. Louis, Missouri. He later worked for the Trentor-Alkaire grocery company and moved to Fort Smith, where he managed a branch of the company.

After the company closed its local interests, Reynolds established his own wholesale grocery business. The firm later became the Reynolds-Foster Company and subsequently Reynolds-Davis and Company, following partnerships with J. Foster and F. R. Davis. In October 1910, the business consolidated with the Fort Smith Wholesale Grocery Company and became the Reynolds-Davis Grocery Company.

== Personal life and death ==
Reynolds married Josephine Louise Kelly in Mobile, Alabama, in May 1867. They had four children: Charles F. Reynolds, James E. Reynolds, William T. Reynolds and Gertrude Reynolds Abbott.

Reynolds died at his home in Fort Smith on January 26, 1927, at the age of 82.
