= Farmers Electric Cooperative =

Farmers Electric Cooperative may refer to:

- Farmers Electric Cooperative (Arkansas)
- Farmers Electric Cooperative (Texas)
