= Salem, Saline County, Arkansas =

Salem, Arkansas
- CDP
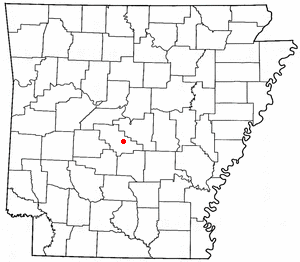
- Location of Salem, Saline County, Arkansas
- Coordinates: 34°37′36″N 92°33′22″W
- Country: United States
- State: Arkansas
- County: Saline

Area
  - Total: 3.19 sq mi (8.27 km^{2})
  - Land: 3.15 sq mi (8.15 km^{2})
  - Water: 0.050 sq mi (0.13 km^{2})
- Elevation: 479 ft (146 m)

Population (2020)
  - Total: 2,544
  - Density: 809/sq mi (312.3/km^{2})
- Time zone: UTC-6 (Central (CST))
  - Summer (DST): UTC-5 (CDT)
- FIPS code: 05-62210
- GNIS feature ID: 2402816

Salem is a census-designated place (CDP) in Saline County, Arkansas, United States. Per the 2020 census, the population was 2,544. It is part of the Little Rock–North Little Rock–Conway Metropolitan Statistical Area.

== Geography ==
According to the United States Census Bureau, the CDP has a total area of 3.2 square miles (8.4 km^{2}), of which 3.2 square miles (8.2 km^{2}) is land and 0.05 square mile (0.1 km^{2}) (1.52%) is water.

== Demographics ==
Historical population
Census	Pop.	Note	%±
2000	2,789		—
2010	2,607		−6.5%
2020	2,544		−2.4%
U.S. Decennial Census; 2010 2020

=== 2020 census ===
Salem CDP, Arkansas – Demographic Profile (NH = Non-Hispanic) Note: the US Census treats Hispanic/Latino as an ethnic category. This table excludes Latinos from the racial categories and assigns them to a separate category. Hispanics/Latinos may be of any race.
Race / Ethnicity	Pop 2010	Pop 2020	% 2010	% 2020
White alone (NH)	2,525	2,295	96.85%	90.21%
Black or African American alone (NH)	17	21	0.65%	0.83%
Native American or Alaska Native alone (NH)	5	8	0.19%	0.31%
Asian alone (NH)	5	6	0.19%	0.24%
Pacific Islander alone (NH)	0	1	0.00%	0.04%
Some Other Race alone (NH)	1	6	0.04%	0.24%
Mixed Race/Multi-Racial (NH)	9	116	0.35%	4.56%
Hispanic or Latino (any race)	45	91	1.73%	3.58%
Total	2,607	2,544	100.00%	100.00%

Note: the US Census treats Hispanic/Latino as an ethnic category. This table excludes Latinos from the racial categories and assigns them to a separate category. Hispanics/Latinos can be of any race.

=== 2000 Census ===
As of the census of 2000, there were 2,789 people, 1,069 households, and 857 families residing in the CDP. The population density was 815.3 inhabitants per square mile (314.8/km^{2}). There were 1,096 housing units at an average density of 320.4 per square mile (123.7/km^{2}). The racial makeup of the CDP was 98.03% White, 0.32% Black or African American, 0.47% Native American, 0.18% Asian, 0.36% from other races, and 0.65% from two or more races. 1.08% of the population were Hispanic or Latino of any race.

There were 1,069 households, out of which 34.8% had children under the age of 18 living with them, 68.8% were married couples living together, 8.0% had a female householder with no husband present, and 19.8% were non-families. 17.4% of all households were made up of individuals, and 5.5% had someone living alone who was 65 years of age or older. The average household size was 2.61 and the average family size was 2.94.

In the CDP the population was spread out, with 24.7% under the age of 18, 8.0% from 18 to 24, 29.2% from 25 to 44, 27.5% from 45 to 64, and 10.5% who were 65 years of age or older. The median age was 39 years. For every 100 females there were 99.9 males. For every 100 females age 18 and over, there were 97.7 males.

The median income for a household in the CDP was $44,681, and the median income for a family was $52,216. Males had a median income of $33,207 versus $26,337 for females. The per capita income for the CDP was $21,301. About 3.9% of families and 3.1% of the population were below the poverty line, including 6.9% of those under age 18 and none of those age 65 or over.

== Education ==
Public education for early childhood, elementary and secondary school students is provided by

- Benton School District, which leads to graduation from Benton High School.
- Bryant Public Schools, which leads to graduation from Bryant High School.

== Notable person ==
- Lanny Fite, Republican member of the Arkansas House of Representatives from Saline County
