= Cole Hamels =

American baseball player (born 1983)

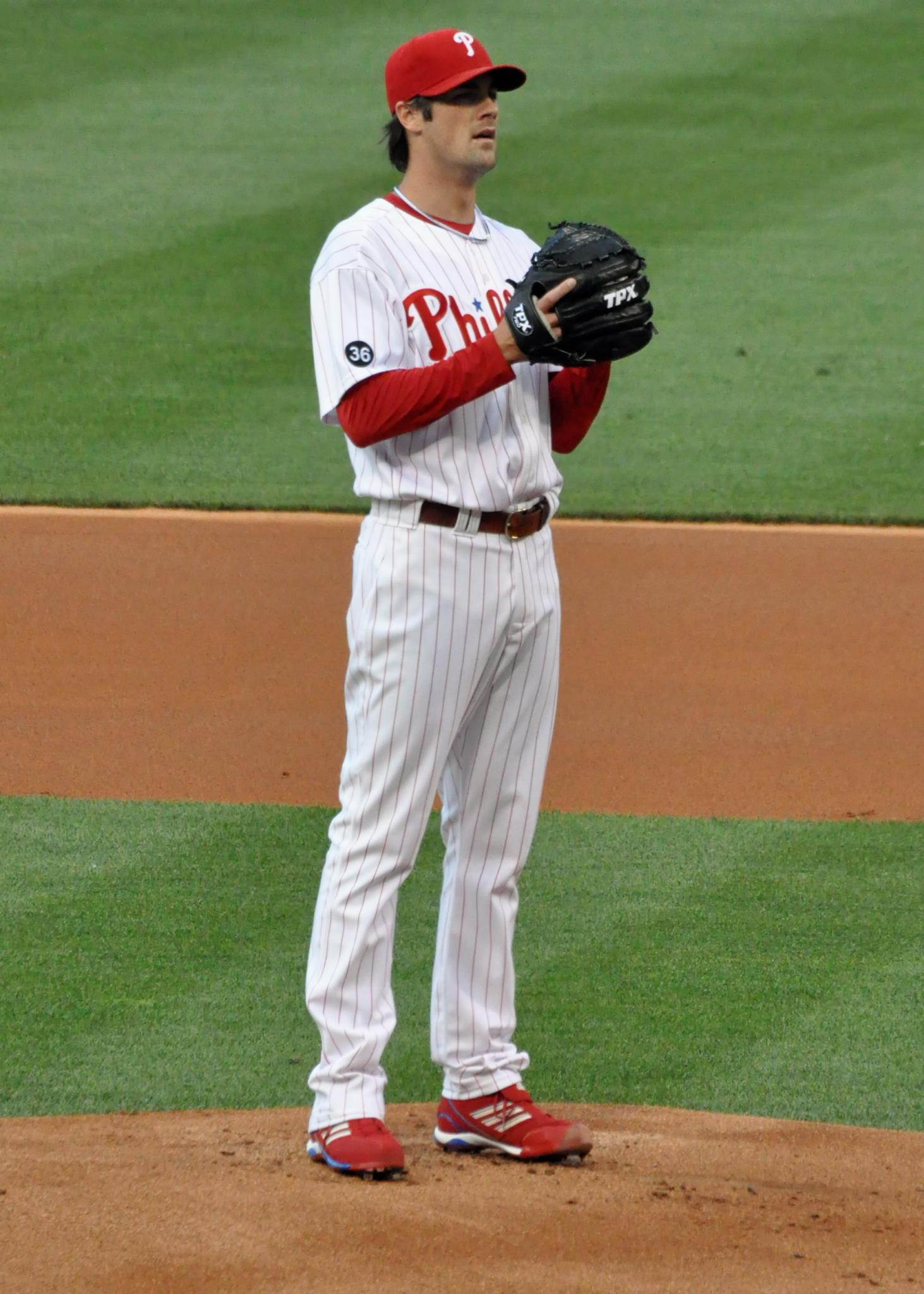
- Hamels with the Philadelphia Phillies in 2010
- Pitcher
- Born: December 27, 1983 (age 42); San Diego, California, U.S.
- Batted: Left Threw: Left

MLB debut
- May 12, 2006, for the Philadelphia Phillies

Last MLB appearance
- September 16, 2020, for the Atlanta Braves

MLB statistics
- Win–loss record: 163–122
- Earned run average: 3.43
- Strikeouts: 2,560
- Stats at Baseball Reference

Teams
- Philadelphia Phillies (2006–2015); Texas Rangers (2015–2018); Chicago Cubs (2018–2019); Atlanta Braves (2020)

Career highlights and awards
- 4× All-Star (2007, 2011, 2012, 2016); World Series champion (2008); World Series MVP (2008); NLCS MVP (2008); Pitched a no-hitter on July 25, 2015; Pitched a combined no-hitter on September 1, 2014

Colbert Michael Hamels (born December 27, 1983), nicknamed "Hollywood", is an American former professional baseball pitcher. He played in Major League Baseball (MLB) for the Philadelphia Phillies (2006–2015), Texas Rangers (2015–2018), Chicago Cubs (2018–2019), and Atlanta Braves (2020).

Originally from San Diego, California, Hamels excelled at Rancho Bernardo High School both academically and athletically. The Phillies drafted Hamels out of high school, in the first round (17th overall) of the 2002 MLB draft, and he began playing in the Phillies’ minor league system. Numerous issues, including an injury sustained in a bar fight, among other injuries, occurred during Hamels’ first few minor league seasons. When he reached the Triple-A level, he was the top pitcher in the Phillies' minor league system in 2006.

In May 2006, Hamels made his major league debut for the Phillies. After securing a long-term spot as a member of the Phillies starting rotation in his rookie season, he made large strides in the 2007 MLB season and won the Phillies' top major league pitcher award. Hamels was both the top pitcher on the team entering the 2008 season, as well as during the Phillies' postseason run, during which they ultimately won the 2008 World Series over the Tampa Bay Rays; he won the World Series Most Valuable Player Award. After the 2008 season, Hamels signed a three-year contract with the Phillies. His statistics declined over the next two seasons, as he struggled through a tumultuous 2009 campaign and somewhat bounced back in 2010 — however, still not approaching his 2008 numbers. Over the next few seasons, Hamels was joined by fellow All-Star pitchers Roy Halladay, Cliff Lee, and Roy Oswalt. Hamels flourished alongside them, putting up some of his top career seasons, before suffering from poor run support in 2013. With the decline of his aging teammates, the team missed the postseason for the next few years, but he remained one of the Phillies' consistent stars. Hamels was traded to the Texas Rangers in 2015, and he sparked their run to the AL West title that season. Hamels spent parts of four seasons with the Rangers, including an All-Star season in 2016, before being traded to the Cubs in 2018. In 2020, he was shut down for the season after pitching only 3 1/3 innings. After two unsuccessful comeback attempts, Hamels announced his retirement in 2023.

== Early life ==
Hamels attended Meadowbrook Middle School and Rancho Bernardo High School in San Diego. He was a "gifted student", and scored a 1510 (out of 1600) on the SAT. Scouts were interested in Hamels while he was in high school primarily because his fastball was clocked as high as 94 miles per hour (151 km/h), and his secondary offerings were considered advanced. However, some teams lost interest when Hamels broke his left humerus during his sophomore year. Nonetheless, Hamels was drafted in the first round of the 2002 Major League Baseball draft by the Philadelphia Phillies with the 17th overall selection.

== Professional career ==
=== Minor league career ===
Hamels began his professional baseball career in 2003, pitching for the Class A Lakewood BlueClaws of the South Atlantic League. Later that season, he was promoted to the Clearwater Threshers of the Class A-Advanced Florida State League. He finished the year by receiving the Paul Owens Award, given to the best pitcher in the Phillies' minor league system.

During the next two seasons, however, Hamels suffered through several injuries, and pitched only sparingly. He missed most of the 2004 season with elbow tendinitis, making only four starts. In 2005, he broke his pitching hand in a bar fight before the season began; after rehabilitation, he was assigned to Clearwater. In July, the Phillies promoted him to the Double-A Reading Phillies of the Eastern League, where he surrendered the first home run of his professional career in his first start. Subsequently, he was shut down for the remainder of the season with back spasms.

In 2006, a healthy Hamels started again at Clearwater, and after a brief stint in Reading, he was promoted to the Scranton/Wilkes-Barre Red Barons of the Triple-A International League. In three games at Scranton, he struck out 36 batters while giving up only one walk and one run. His minor league statistics included a record of 14–4 with a 1.43 ERA and 273 strikeouts in 35 games pitched. For his performance, the Phillies promoted him to the major leagues.

=== Philadelphia Phillies ===
==== 2006 season ====
Hamels was called up to the Philadelphia Phillies in May 2006. In his Major League Baseball debut on May 12, he pitched five scoreless innings, allowed one hit, struck out seven batters and walked five while earning a no-decision against the Cincinnati Reds. In his second career start, Hamels was dominant until the seventh inning, during which he was pulled after he allowed several baserunners, but again received a no-decision. A shoulder injury scratched Hamels from the lineup of what would have originally been his third major league start. He was put on the 15-day disabled list and returned on June 6 to defeat the Arizona Diamondbacks 10–1 for his first major league victory. On August 14, Hamels had his best start of his rookie season, shutting out the New York Mets over eight innings and striking out nine in the Phillies' 13–0 victory. He finished his rookie season with a 9–8 record, a 4.08 earned run average (ERA) and 145 strikeouts (third among NL rookies) in 132 1/3 innings (sixth among NL rookies).

==== 2007 season ====
Hamels entered the 2007 season having done significant work in the weight room in the offseason and at spring training. His tenacity came to fruition when, on April 21, 2007, Hamels pitched his first major league complete game, allowing one run on five hits and two walks while setting a career high with 15 strikeouts. Just three days before, the Phillies moved their opening day starter Brett Myers to the bullpen to be the closer, making Hamels the team's number one starter. On May 16, he carried a perfect game into the seventh inning against the Milwaukee Brewers but then walked leadoff hitter Rickie Weeks and surrendered a home run to the next batter, J. J. Hardy.

Barring serious first-half slumps, he figures to go (to the All-Star game) every year until the mid-2010s.

— The Philadelphia Inquirer columnist Phil Sheridan

For his strong performance during the first half of the season, Hamels was, for the first time in his career, selected a member of the NL All Star Team. As Hamels had been the Phillies' only consistent starter to that point, even to the point that one columnist said the Phillies are a joke "as long as we are forced to look forward to someone other than Cole Hamels on the mound", the Phillies acquired Kyle Lohse to supplement the rotation soon before the trading deadline. Several weeks later, Hamels was placed on the 15-day disabled list (DL) with a mild left elbow strain. After the Phillies activated him from the DL, on September 28, he helped the Phillies take over first place in the National League East by striking out 13 Washington Nationals over eight innings in a 6–0 win. Two days later, the team clinched a spot in the playoffs for the first time in 14 years. In the first game of the National League Division Series, he started for the Phillies, but surrendered three runs, three hits, and an "uncharacteristic" four walks, while striking out seven in 6 2/3 innings; he was assessed the loss. Ultimately, the Phillies lost the series. Hamels finished with a regular-season record of 15–5, a 3.39 ERA, and 177 strikeouts in 183 1/3 innings. The Philadelphia chapter of the Baseball Writers' Association of America (BBWAA) presented him the "Steve Carlton Most Valuable Pitcher" award.

==== 2008 season ====
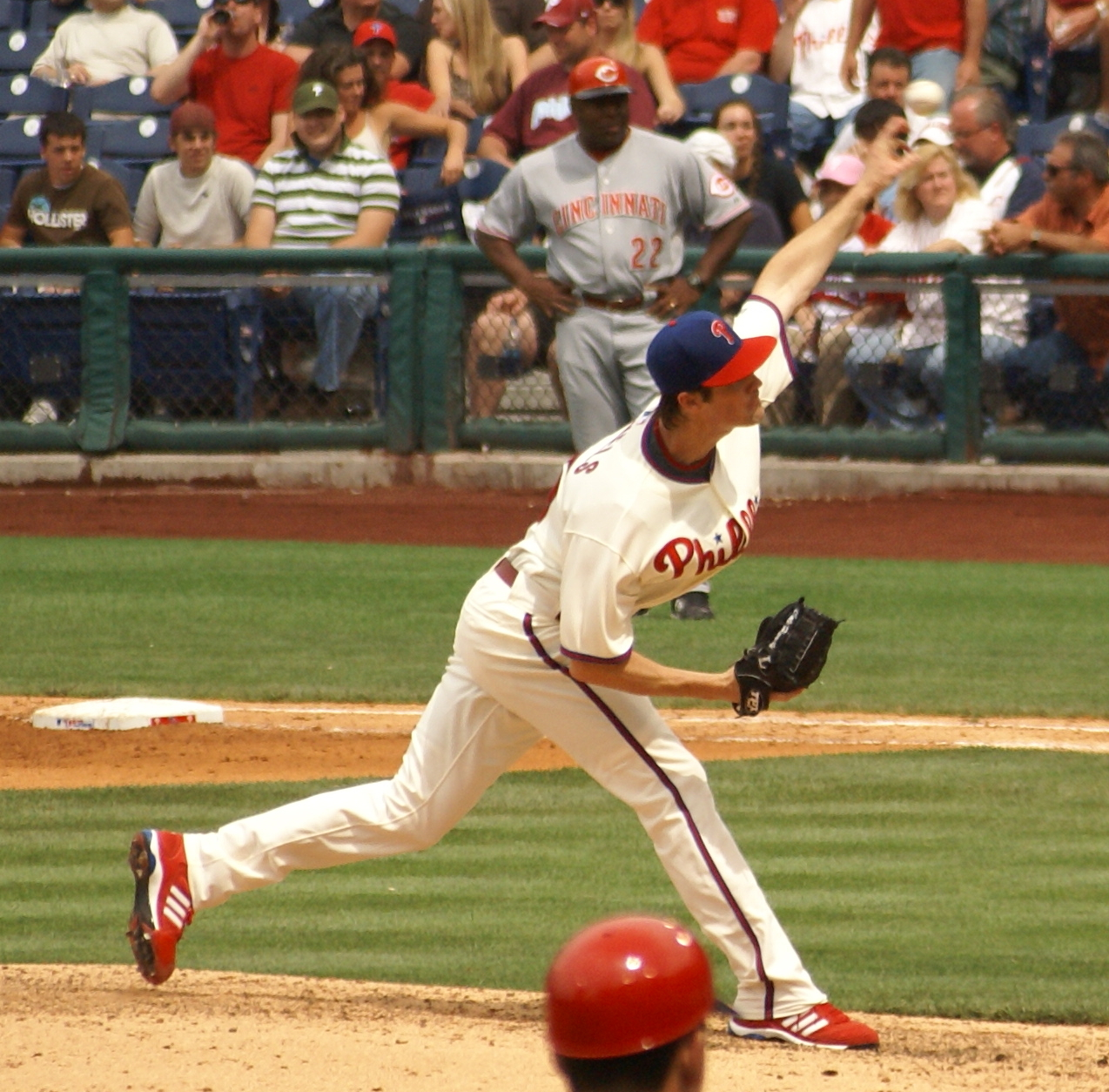
Hamels pitching against the Cincinnati Reds in 2008

Before the season began in March, Hamels made a complaint about the Phillies underpaying him, saying it was a "low blow" and he was "caught off-guard" with the gap between what he and his agent John Boggs felt was a fair reward for his performance in the previous season and what he was paid: the Phillies paid him $500,000, barely above the minimum salary for MLB players, despite Hamels' strong performance.

Though Hamels was the "clear-cut ace", Charlie Manuel penciled in Brett Myers as the Phillies' opening day starter because Myers accepted his role as closer the preceding season, putting the team ahead of his personal wishes to start.

By the end of April, Hamels led the Phillies in most pitching categories, including wins (3), ERA (2.70), and innings pitched (43 1/3). Continuing his dominance into May, Hamels recorded his first career complete game shutout against the Atlanta Braves on the 15th of that month. By June, Myers had been demoted to the minor leagues due to his ineffectiveness, leaving Hamels alone atop the rotation. Hamels was snubbed from a selection to the All-Star Game despite strong numbers. For the season, Hamels was 14–10 with a 3.09 ERA and 196 strikeouts in 227 1/3 innings; he had the lowest on-base percentage-against (OBP) in the majors at .272. FanGraphs also rated his changeup as the most effective in the majors.

Hamels pitched in Game 1 of the National League Division Series against the Brewers, pitching "eight spectacular two-hit shutout innings" during which he struck out nine hitters, notching his first career playoff win, and the Phillies' first playoff win since 1993. He commented, "I knew the importance of the game. And it's something where, because of last year, I learned what it really takes in trying to ... kind of mellow out, not to have that sort of excitement where you can't really control everything." He was named the Most Valuable Player (MVP) of the National League Championship Series, going 2–0 in the NLCS with a 1.93 ERA and winning the series clincher on October 15 in Los Angeles.

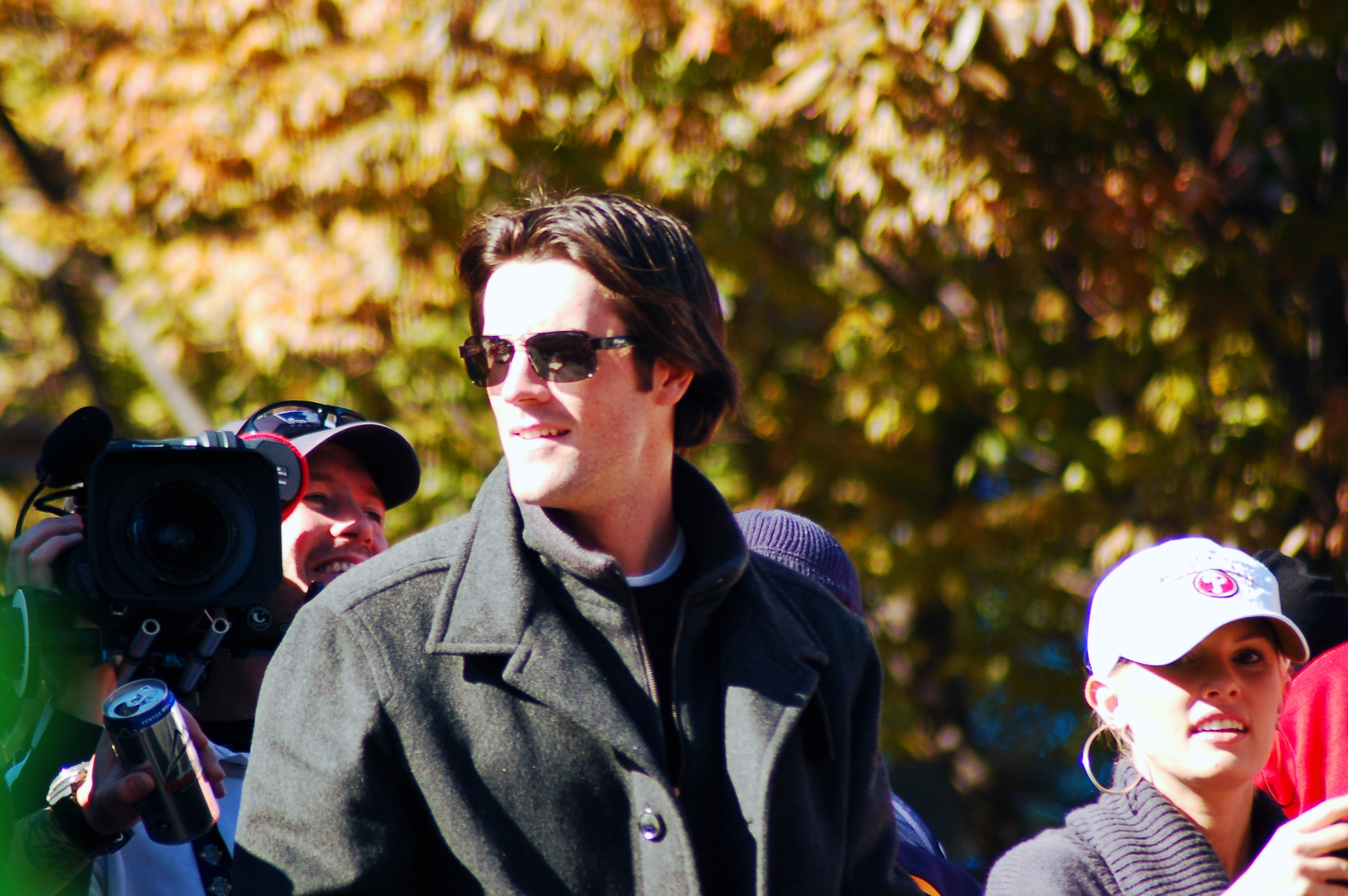
Cole Hamels in World Series victory parade on October 31, 2008

Hamels was selected the Phillies starter for Game 1 of the World Series; the Phillies won 3–2, and Hamels earned his fourth win of the postseason. Hamels also started Game 5, which was suspended due to rain after the top of the sixth inning tied at 2–2 so he received a no-decision. When Game 5 resumed, Hamels did not pitch on short rest but the Phillies won 4–3 to clinch the World Series.

Overall, Hamels made five postseason starts in 2008, going 4–0 with a 1.80 ERA. Hamels threw a total of 35 innings during the postseason, and held opponents scoreless in 28 of them; he never allowed more than one run in any of the seven innings in which he did not hold opponents scoreless. Hamels was named the World Series MVP.

Subsequently, sportswriter Jayson Stark wrote,

The names on the list are the names who have carved their legends in the month of October ... We know their names because October was their kind of month, and they belong on that list because they once did something very few pitchers have ever done. They all won four starts in the same postseason. And now they have company ... a 24-year-old left-hander named Cole Hamels. And with every time the Phillies handed him the baseball in October 2008, it became more apparent that he is one of the sports' most special talents.

— Stark in Worth the Wait: Tales of the 2008 Phillies

The Philadelphia chapter of the BBWAA presented him the "Steve Carlton Most Valuable Pitcher" award for the second consecutive year.

==== 2009 season ====
Hamels started his 2009 season by signing a three-year, $20.5 million contract with the Phillies. On February 14, the first day of spring training for pitchers and catchers, when asked who the Opening Day starter would be, manager Charlie Manuel responded, "Yeah, you might as well go ahead and pencil him in. I don't think there's any sense in me playing games. Go ahead, pencil him in."

However, Hamels left spring training on March 16 after feeling tightness between innings, and flew to Philadelphia to have his left elbow examined by Dr. Michael Ciccotti. "This will obviously set me back a couple of days, and I don't think that should be a big deal", said Hamels. Ciccotti found no structural damage in his arm, yet Hamels still did not pitch on Opening Day as expected; Myers did for the third consecutive season. For the first time in his career, Hamels went winless in his first four starts, and left back-to-back starts early due to injury in late April, sustaining a left-shoulder contusion and an ankle sprain respectively. From June on, however, he returned to his previous form, recording two complete-game shutouts (tied for the NL-lead), striking out at least 10 batters in two separate games, and amassing a 21-inning scoreless streak from August 21 to September 6, while allowing just two home runs in his final eight starts. In July, the Phillies augmented their starting rotation by acquiring two former Cy Young Award winners in Cliff Lee and Pedro Martínez from a trade and a free agent signing respectively. Due to his early season injury struggles, Hamels posted a 10–11 record and a 4.32 ERA in the regular season, his first major league season in which he posted a sub-.500 record, and the worst ERA of his career to that point.

Hamels started Game 2 of the National League Division Series against the Colorado Rockies, allowing four earned runs through five innings to take the loss. Nevertheless, the Phillies won the series, three games to one. He earned the win in Game 1 of the National League Championship Series as the Phillies beat the Dodgers, 8–6. Hamels started Game 3 of the World Series against the New York Yankees, pitching 4 1/3 innings, allowing five earned runs and taking the loss as the Yankees won that game 8–5. Afterward, he told reporters, "I can't wait for it (the season) to end. It's been mentally draining. It's one of those things where, a year in, you just can't wait for a fresh start", comments that were criticized by manager Charlie Manuel but otherwise largely regarded as speaking out of frustration. Later in the series, after the Phillies won Game 5, a confrontational Brett Myers mockingly asked Hamels: "What are you doing here? I thought you quit." Years later, in 2018, Hamels joked that Yankee fans love him due to the fact that he helped them win the series. The Phillies lost the series to the New York Yankees in six games.

Rob Neyer, a sabermetrician and columnist for ESPN.com, contradicted anyone who asserted Hamels' skills had deteriorated, instead commenting:

Last October, everybody was ready to anoint Hamels some sort of superhero. This was largely because he went 4–0 during the Phillies' championship run, but also because he went 14–10 with a 3.09 ERA during the regular season. Last season, Hamels' strikeout-to-walk ratio was 3.7; this year it's 3.8. Last year, Hamels gave up 1.1 home runs per nine innings; this year he's given up 1.3 homers per nine. The only real difference between the 2008 Hamels and the 2009 Hamels is luck.

— Rob Neyer, ESPN.com, August 27, 2009

Phillies' pitching coach Rich Dubee and Hamels himself blamed Hamels' demeanor for some of his decline, noting, "He is such a perfectionist...his approach wasn't very good last year. His success won't come back until his demeanor changes" and "The more angry you get, it's that much tougher to execute your next pitch. I think I let [expectations] get to me" respectively.

==== 2010 season ====
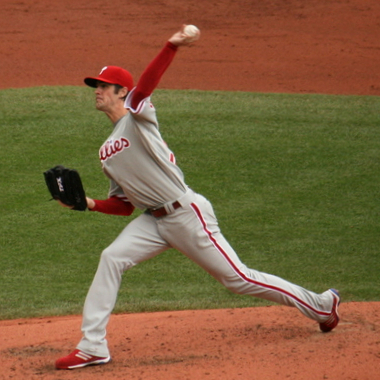
Hamels pitching for the Philadelphia Phillies in 2010

Entering the 2010 season, the Phillies traded away Cliff Lee, but in doing so, acquired Roy Halladay in a "mega-trade". They did not re-sign Myers, and Halladay was named the Phillies' opening day starter. Among Hamels' season highlights were a start on June 7 against the San Diego Padres during which he threw 6 1/3 innings of no-hit baseball, winning five consecutive starts including three consecutive scoreless starts from late-August to mid-September, and striking out 13 batters, tied for his second-highest career total, on September 13 against the Florida Marlins.

The Phillies finished with the best record in MLB. Hamels started Game 3 of the National League Division Series against the Cincinnati Reds and, for the first time in his postseason career, pitched a complete-game shutout. He also became the first pitcher to win a postseason game at Great American Ball Park. The Phillies advanced to the National League Championship Series facing the San Francisco Giants, where Hamels took the loss in Game 3, giving up three runs as the Giants' Matt Cain shut out the Phillies, en route to the Phillies' ultimate elimination in six games.

Statistically, Hamels rebounded from his previous season by posting a 12–11 record with a 3.06 ERA, the latter of which was, at the time, a career-best. He also struck out a career-high 211 batters. Throughout the season, he was plagued by a lack of run support; in 1/3 of his starts, the Phillies did not score a single run while he was in the game. Moreover, he received the fifth-lowest run support in the NL. Nevertheless, he allowed three or fewer earned runs in 26 of his 33 starts. Jeff Nelson "facetiously" evaluated Hamels' season as follows:

Headcase. Immature. Soft. Unprepared. He wouldn't pitch on three-days rest if asked. He's not a big game pitcher. He sounds like a whiny 7-year old – these were some of the descriptions I heard and read from many Phillies fans following Cole Hamels' disappointing 2009 season. Heck, some people even wanted him traded after what he said during the '09 World Series. To the naked eye, Cole just wasn't right two years ago. Fast forward a year later and Hamels all the sudden 'found his game.' He 'flicked a switch' or 'put his game face on.' He was more prepared heading in to 2010 or he was cured from the Verducci effect.

— Jeff Nelson, contributor to Phillies Nation, December 31, 2010

==== 2011 season ====
On December 15, 2010, Cliff Lee returned to the Phillies as he signed a free-agent contract with Philadelphia for five years and $120 million with a vesting option for a sixth year. After this signing, the Phillies' starting rotation consisted of Roy Halladay, Roy Oswalt, Cliff Lee, Cole Hamels, and Joe Blanton. This rotation was considered one of the best in pitching history by many. Halladay, Oswalt, Lee, and Hamels were dubbed the 'Phantastic Phour' by fans and the media.

Hamels entered the 2011 season with a large amount of excitement and hype from fans and the media. By the All-Star game, Hamels was 4–3. On July 3, when the rosters for the MLB All-Star Game were broadcast on TBS, it was announced that Hamels was voted onto the National League team along with teammates Halladay, Lee, Plácido Polanco, and Shane Victorino. Hamels was not eligible to play, however, because he had pitched the Sunday prior to the All-Star Game. Hamels shared his dismay with this rule, saying, "It's one of those things where people who don't play the game make the rules."

The Phillies finished with the best record in MLB for the second year in a row. In the National League Division Series against the St. Louis Cardinals, Hamels started Game 3 which resulted in a 3–2 win to give the Phillies a 2–1 series lead, however the Phillies would lose Games 4 and 5 to be eliminated.

Hamels finished the 2011 season with a record of 14–9, 194 strikeouts, an ERA of 2.79, and a 0.986 WHIP. He finished fifth in the Cy Young Award voting behind Clayton Kershaw, Halladay, Lee, and Ian Kennedy.

==== 2012 season ====
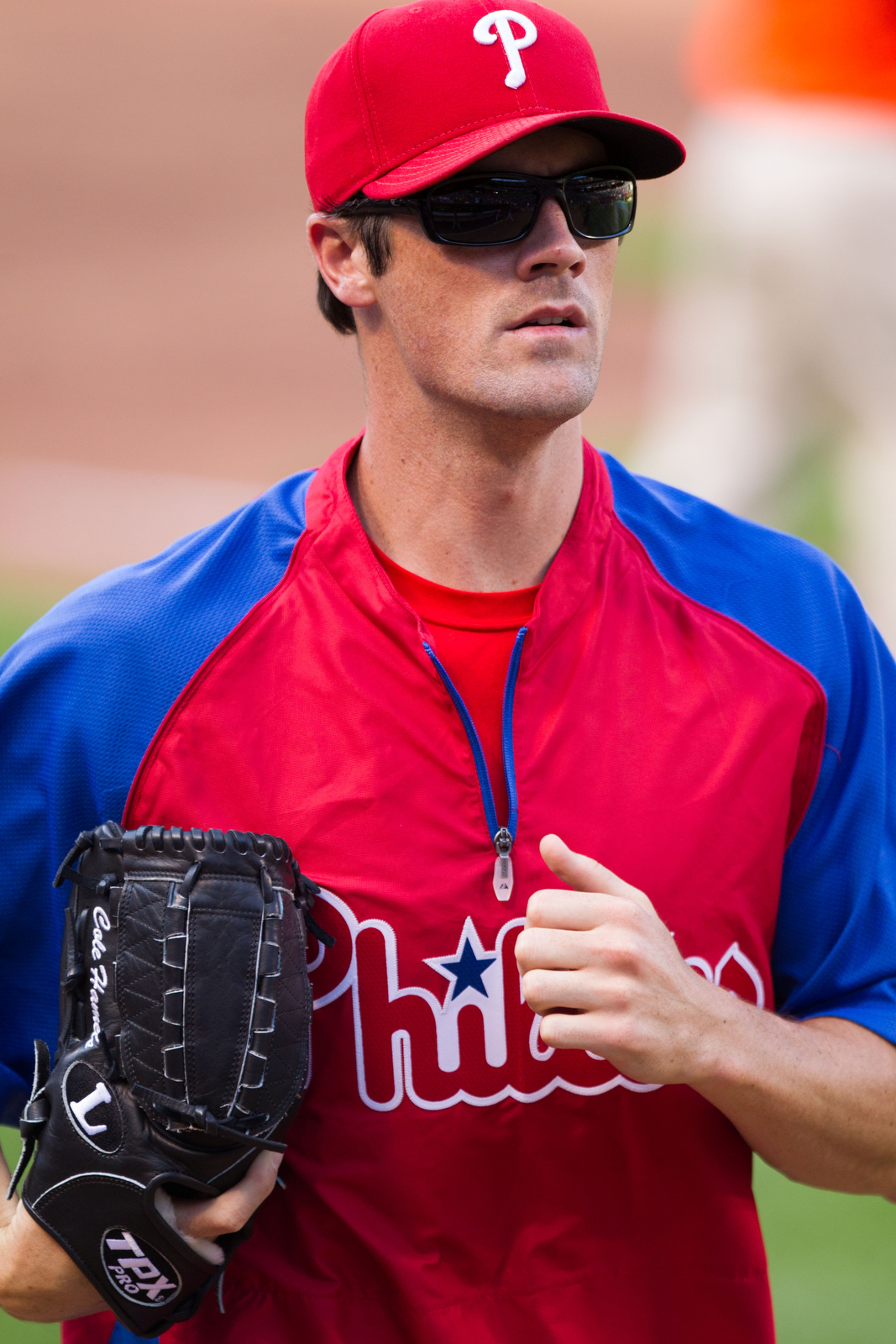
Hamels warms up before a game on June 8, 2012

In October 2011, Hamels underwent elbow and hernia surgeries. Hamels had missed scheduled starts in August due to a stiff shoulder, and loose bodies were removed from his elbow to fix his problems. Hamels was ready to pitch by the start of spring training in 2012.

On January 17, Hamels and the Phillies agreed to a one-year, $15 million contract to avoid arbitration. This was the highest salary ever paid to a pitcher eligible for arbitration before free agency.

On May 6, Hamels was suspended for five games after hitting Bryce Harper in his lower back with a pitch, after admitting that it was intentional. On July 21, 2012, Hamels hit his first career home run, off San Francisco Giants pitcher Matt Cain, who had homered off him in the top half of the same inning, the first time in MLB since 1990 that two pitchers had hit home runs off of each other in the same inning.

Hamels would stay a Phillie when he agreed to a contract extension on July 24. The six-year, $144 million contract was the second-largest contract ever signed by a pitcher. The deal included a vesting option for 2019 worth $24 million. If the option did not vest, it would have turned into a club option for $20 million that included a $6 million buyout.

Hamels finished the season with career highs in wins (17) and strikeouts (216), and finished eighth in the NL Cy Young Award voting. His 3.05 ERA ranked second-best in his career (behind only his 2.79 ERA in 2011). The Philadelphia chapter of the BBWAA presented him the "Steve Carlton Most Valuable Pitcher" award.

==== 2013 season ====
Before the 2013 season in spring training, manager Charlie Manuel named Hamels the 2013 opening day starter, which Matt Gelb of The Philadelphia Inquirer wrote was a "long time coming". In his first career opening day start on April 1 against the Atlanta Braves, Hamels surrendered five earned runs in five innings and took the loss.

Particularly early in the season, Hamels was plagued by a lack of run support; as of May 27, he had the fifth-lowest in the major leagues. He lost his eighth start on May 27, declining to a record of 1–8, which one Sports Illustrated column attributed more to the Phillies poor offense than Hamels. Nevertheless, it was "easily ... Hamels' worst performance of his eight-year career". Aside from offensive struggles while Hamels was pitching, the Phillies defense struggled, though Hamels kept a positive attitude, once commenting that his luck should improve, as "I've been doing pretty well on the plane in poker." Towards the end of the season, however, Hamels "put it together". In his final 11 starts he surrendered more than three runs only once. In total, he amassed an 8–14 record with a 3.60 ERA in 220 innings and 202 strikeouts (sixth in NL). Despite struggles from his teammates, sportswriter Bill Baer noted that Hamels,

was worse at generating swings and misses. His strikeout rate declined by 2.6 percent and his overall swinging strike rate declined by 2.1 percent. That doesn't seem like a whole lot, but consider that opposing hitters swung at 1,774 pitches during the 2013 season. A 2.1 percent decrease means 37 fewer swings and misses. That's a combination of 37 more balls in play or foul balls prolonging an at-bat.

— Bill Baer, Crashburn Alley, November 16, 2013

Despite Hamels' poor record and ERA, 25 of his 33 starts were quality starts, and thus he gave his team a chance to win 25 times, yet only got eight wins.

==== 2014 season ====
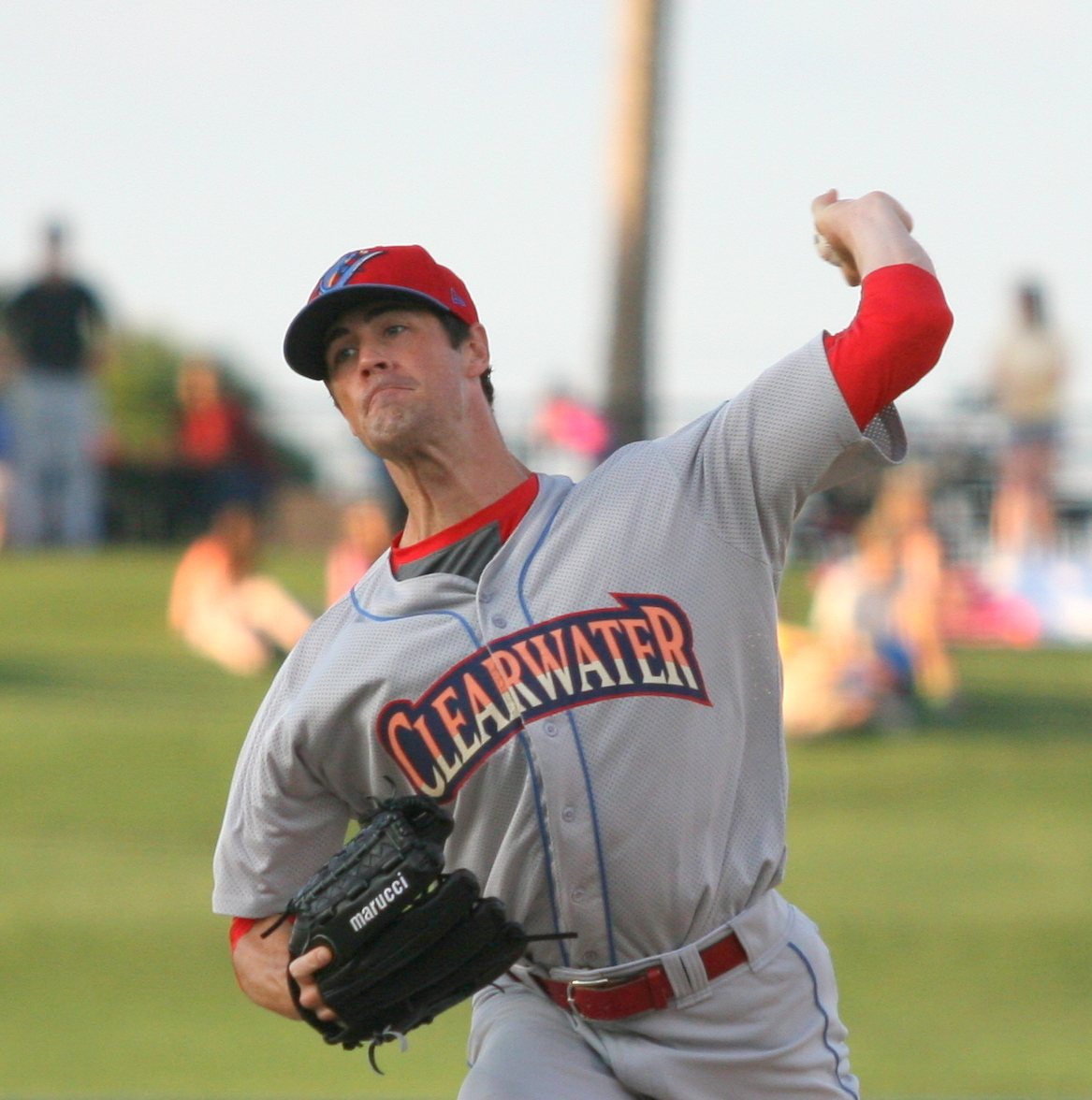
Hamels pitching for the Clearwater Threshers in 2014

Before the 2014 season, Hamels announced that he would not be ready to pitch on Opening Day because of tendinitis in his biceps. On April 6, Hamels pitched a rehab game at the Class A-Advanced level, striking out four while allowing two earned runs on three hits in four innings. He made his first start of the season on April 23.

Despite lack of run support contributing to a poor win–loss record, Hamels was among the best pitchers in the National League, and was even mentioned as a Cy Young candidate. On September 1, Hamels pitched six innings of a Phillies combined no-hitter against the Atlanta Braves. Hamels was pulled for a pinch hitter in the top of the seventh due to having five walks, a hit-batter, and 108 pitches through six innings. Overall, Hamels was the only consistent star on the Phillies, finished sixth in Cy Young voting, and was frequently mentioned as a candidate to be traded in the offseason to bolster the Phillies' lackluster farm system, after he avoided being dealt at the July trading deadline.

==== 2015 season ====
At the start of the 2015 season, there was much focus and speculation regarding trade possibilities surrounding Hamels. The Boston Red Sox, Los Angeles Dodgers, Texas Rangers, Chicago Cubs, New York Yankees, and San Francisco Giants expressed interest in trading for him during the 2015 season.

On July 25, 2015, in what would be his final start for the Phillies before being traded, Hamels no-hit the Chicago Cubs 5–0 at Wrigley Field, striking out 13 and giving up only two walks, both to Dexter Fowler, and besting the Cubs' Jake Arrieta—himself a no-hit pitcher a month later, on August 30 of that season. It was the first no-hitter against the Cubs since Sandy Koufax's perfect game in 1965, and first at Wrigley since the Cubs' Milt Pappas in 1972. Hamels also joined Vida Blue, Mike Witt, Kent Mercker and Kevin Millwood as no-hit pitchers who also pitched in a combined no-hitter.

=== Texas Rangers ===
==== Remainder of 2015 season ====
On July 31, 2015, Hamels was traded to the Texas Rangers along with Jake Diekman in exchange for Matt Harrison, Nick Williams, Jorge Alfaro, Jake Thompson, Alec Asher, and Jerad Eickhoff. Hamels became the first pitcher to be traded during a regular season after pitching a no-hitter in his final start with the team that traded him. Bert Blyleven had been the last pitcher to pitch a no-hitter in his final start with the team that traded him; after pitching a no-hitter for the Rangers in his final start of the 1977 season, he was traded to the Pittsburgh Pirates that offseason.

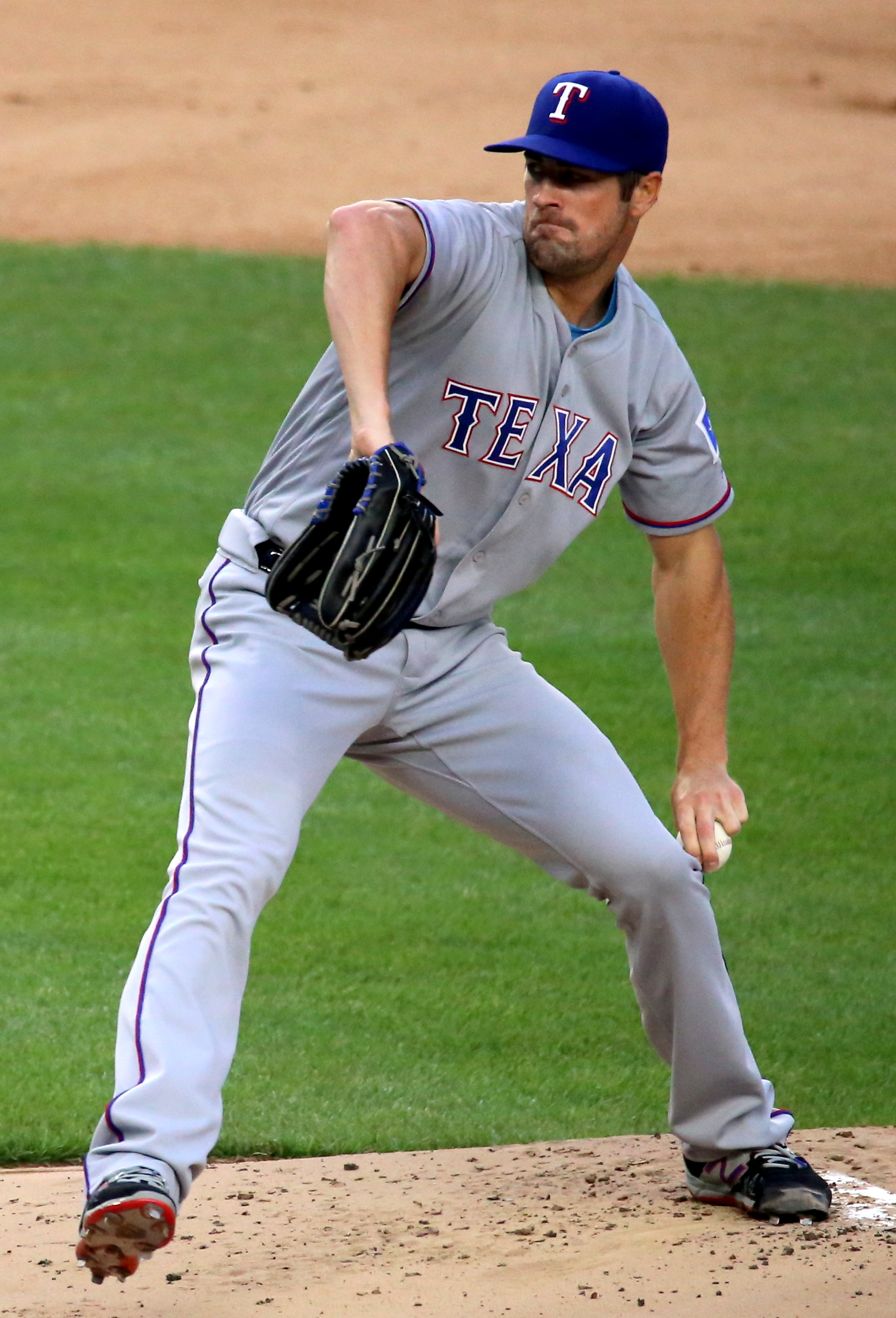
Hamels pitching for the Texas Rangers in 2016

With the Rangers, Hamels went 7–1 in 12 starts with a 3.66 ERA. The Rangers were under .500 as late as August 3, but posted a winning record for the remainder of the 2015 season and eventually overtook the Houston Astros in September for the American League West division lead. The Rangers clinched the AL West title on the final day of the season, as Hamels threw a complete-game three-hitter in a 9–2 win over the Los Angeles Angels, the team's sixth division title and seventh postseason appearance in franchise history. Hamels' positive effect on the Rangers was compared to that of the Toronto Blue Jays' David Price, another ace starting pitcher who helped spearhead a run to the postseason after blending in seamlessly with a struggling team who acquired him at the trade deadline.

The Rangers lost to the Blue Jays in five games in the Division Series after squandering a 2–0 series lead. Hamels received a no-decision in Game 2 as he left the game tied, but the Rangers won in 14 innings. Hamels started Game 5, and was pulled in the bottom of the seventh inning while the Rangers were leading 3–2, after Ranger infielders allowed the first three Jays batters to reach base on three consecutive errors; the Jays subsequently scored four runs to win 6–3, and Hamels was charged with the loss as he was responsible for the runners on base. (Only two of the runs he was charged with surrendering were earned.)

==== 2016 season ====
Hamels was named the Opening Day starter for the Rangers in 2016. To start the season, after allowing two home runs in two innings, Hamels calmed down to pitch seven strong innings, while only allowing two runs on four hits and eight strikeouts for a win against the Seattle Mariners. On June 12, again facing Seattle, Hamels recorded his 2,000th career strikeout, becoming the 77th player, and seventh active player, to reach the milestone. He was named to the All-Star Game. On September 28, at home against the Milwaukee Brewers, Hamels claimed his 200th strikeout of the season.

Hamels finished the 2016 season with a 15–5 record and a 3.32 ERA in 32 starts. He led major league pitchers in percent of balls pulled against him (47.1%).

==== 2017 season ====
On May 3, 2017, Hamels was placed on the 15-day disabled list due to a strained right oblique muscle. He was ruled out for eight weeks. In 24 starts for the 2017 season, he compiled an 11–6 record and a 4.20 ERA.

==== 2018 season ====
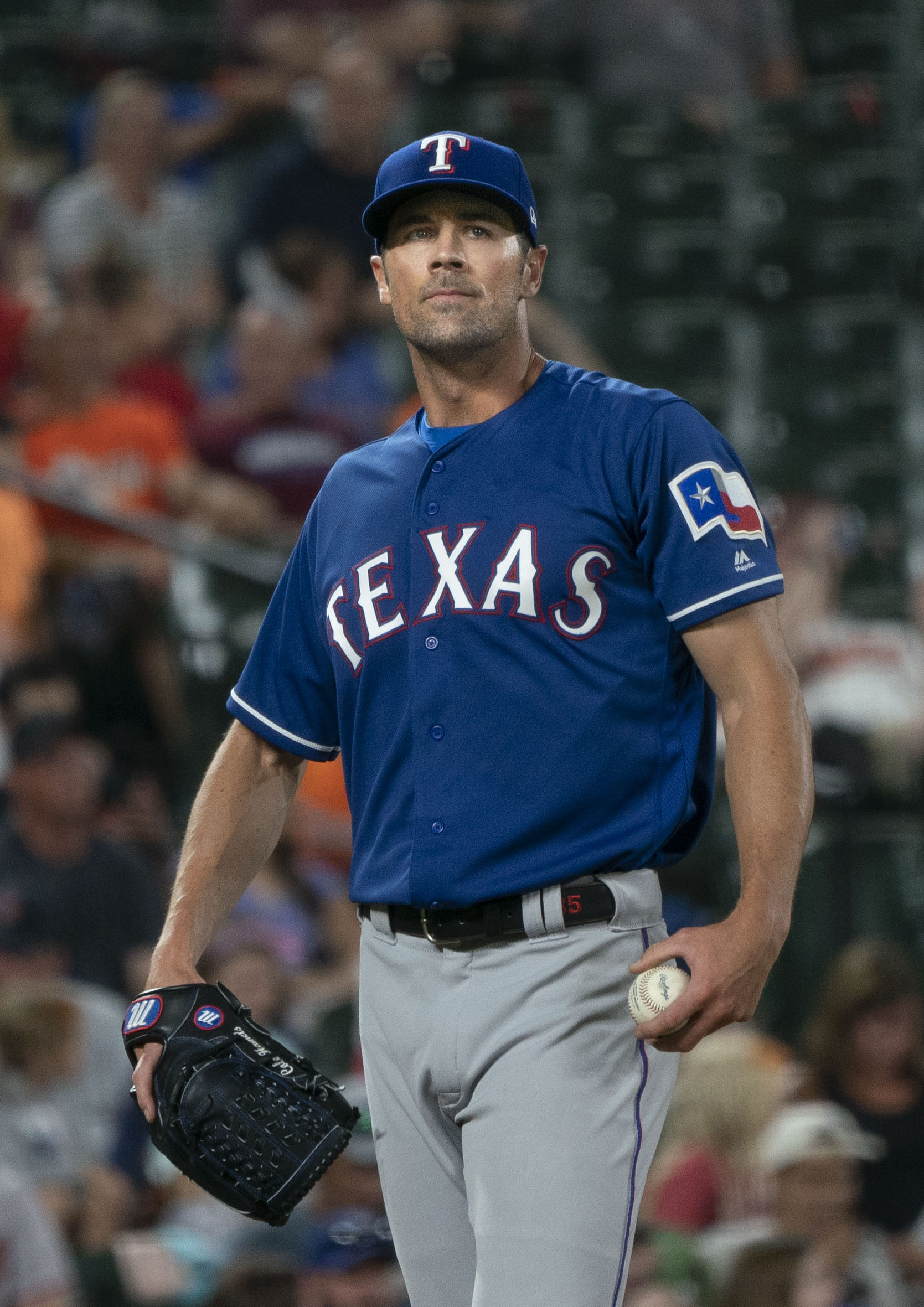
Hamels with the Rangers in 2018

Hamels opened the season as the Rangers' ace. In 20 starts, Hamels was 5–9 with a 4.72 ERA in 114 1/3 innings.

=== Chicago Cubs ===
On July 27, 2018, Hamels was traded to the Chicago Cubs in exchange for Eddie Butler, Rollie Lacy, and Alexander Ovalles. He made his first appearance as a Cub on August 1, striking out nine. He gave up one unearned run and three hits in five innings, earning the win. On August 23, Hamels threw a complete game against the Cincinnati Reds, only allowing one run. Through his first five starts with the Cubs he was 4–0 with a 0.79 ERA, and the team won all five of the games.

For the 2018 season between the two teams, he was 9–12 with a 3.78 ERA and led the major leagues in hit batsmen, with 19. He also led the majors in giving up the highest percentage of hard-hit balls (41.9%).

Hamels pitched in relief in the Cubs’ Wild Card Game extra-inning loss to the Colorado Rockies. He allowed two hits and a walk over two scoreless innings.

In 2019, Hamels was 7–7 with a 3.81 ERA in 147 2/3 innings over 27 starts.

=== Atlanta Braves ===
On December 4, 2019, Hamels signed a one-year, $18 million contract with the Atlanta Braves.

During spring training, Hamels suffered a shoulder injury and was not expected to be able to pitch at the start of the 2020 season. However, the COVID-19 pandemic delayed the start of the regular season until July 24, with Hamels expected to make the Opening Day roster.

In 2020, he made only one start, pitching 3 1/3 innings and giving up three earned runs against the Baltimore Orioles on September 16, which would be his final major league appearance.

=== Los Angeles Dodgers ===
On August 4, 2021, Hamels signed with the Los Angeles Dodgers for $1 million through the remainder of the 2021 season, plus $200,000 for each game he started in the major leagues. However, he experienced arm pain while throwing a simulated game in Arizona and was placed on the 60-day injured list, ending his comeback attempt.

=== San Diego Padres ===
Hamels underwent three different surgeries in 2022 to try and prepare for another comeback attempt. On February 16, 2023, he signed a minor league contract with the San Diego Padres. Hamels had originally intended to make starts with the Padres' Triple-A affiliate, the El Paso Chihuahuas, as part of his recovery. However, he experienced inflammation in his shoulder while working out with the team and was unable to continue his comeback attempt.

=== Retirement ===
On August 4, 2023, Hamels announced his retirement from professional baseball. On June 21, 2024, the Phillies held a pregame ceremony where Hamels officially retired as a member of the team. Though his number has not been officially retired by the Phillies, two days before his retirement ceremony with the team, Phillies outfielder David Dahl changed his number from #35 to #31 out of respect for Hamels, who had known Dahl during his stint with the Padres.

== Pitching style ==
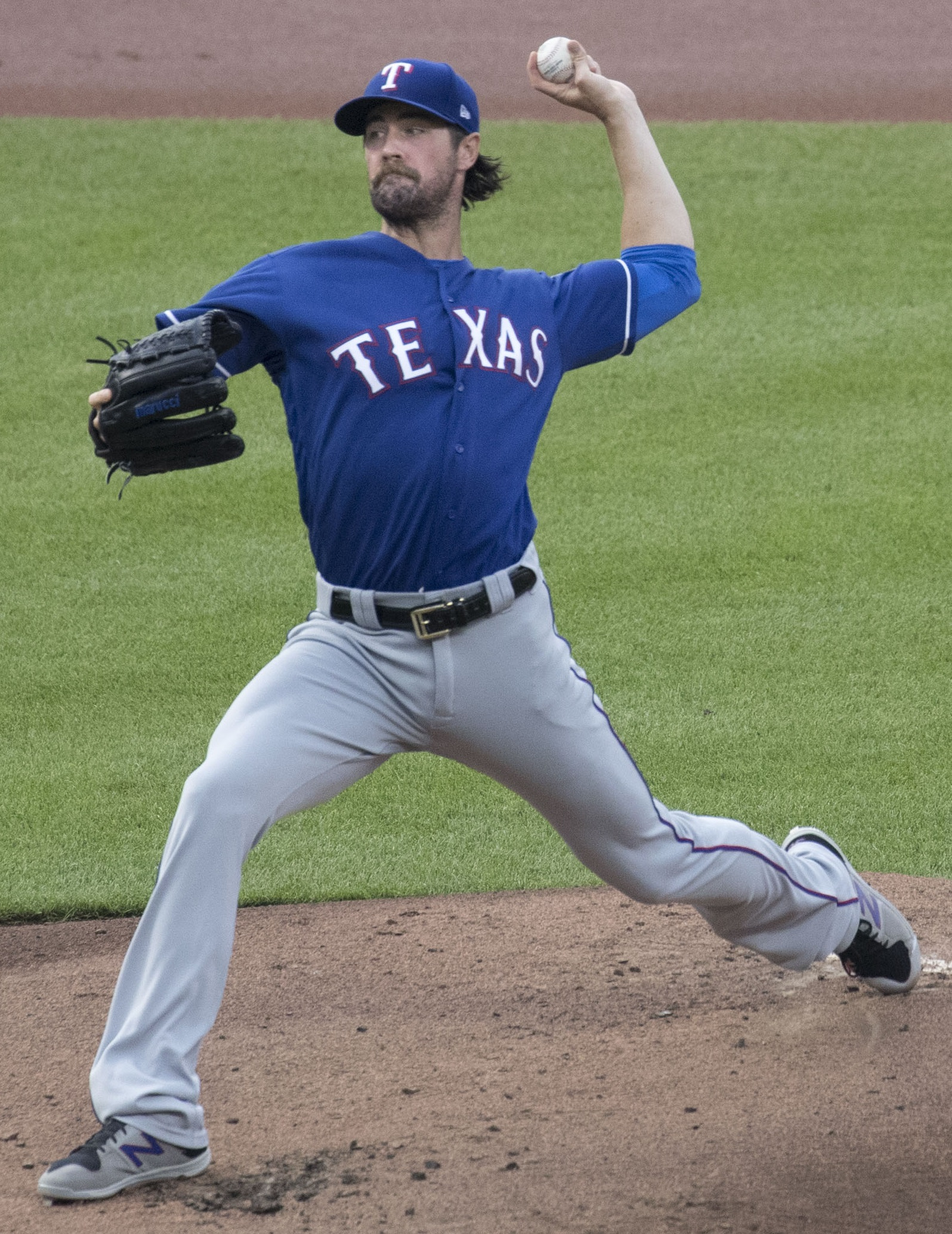
Hamels pitching for the Texas Rangers in 2017

Hamels was known for possessing one of the better changeups in the game. In 2012, Fangraphs ranked Hamels as having the fourth best changeup, trailing only Jason Vargas, Tommy Milone, and Félix Hernández. The Hardball Times called his changeup a "killer" pitch to right-handed hitters, noting that while it is also effective against left-handed hitters, when they put it in play, they generally have success. Rangers pitching coach Mike Maddux said of Hamels,

It's a difficult task to try to get young guys to throw changeups, because their whole amateur career is spent staring at the scout with the gun. For a young guy to have a good changeup, that's an aptitude right there. It's pitchability.

The development of Hamels' changeup is attributed by his high school pitching coach, Mark Furtak, to his having broken his arm in high school. He could no longer work on his curveball for several months and was forced to focus on the changeup. Chipper Jones, a Hall of Famer for the Atlanta Braves, said in 2008 that Hamels was the "best left hander in the National League ... you have to respect his fastball, and his change-up is devastating. If you're guessing fastball and you get change-up, you're way out in front of it. His change-up is a soft sinker that just falls down." Aside from the changeup, he threw a four-seam fastball that averaged 91.4 miles per hours and could reach 94–96 miles per hour (151–154 km/h)), a cutter 88 mph (142 km/h), and an "inconsistent" curveball that sometimes loops and other times is sharp and averaged 77 mph (124 km/h). Prior to developing his cutter, he briefly threw a two-seam fastball around 2008 and 2009, before debuting his cutter in 2010. Once he obtained a "feel" for how to effectively throw his cutter, it helped him increase his groundball rate to 52.3 percent in 2011.

== Personal life ==
Hamels is of Dutch descent and is the oldest of three children. He grew up in San Diego, where his parents still live. He and reality television personality Heidi Strobel, a contestant on Survivor: The Amazon, married on December 31, 2006. They lived with their children in a Newtown Square, Pennsylvania home that they built in 2014, but later put up for sale in 2021. They owned a home in Southlake, Texas. The family built a home in Branson, Missouri, but instead chose to relocate to Texas, and they then donated their Missouri home to Camp Barnabas, a camp for children with special needs.

The Hamels formed the Hamels Foundation in 2009 as a non-profit with a mission of uplifting the lives of children, families, and communities across the globe through the power of education. The Hamels Foundation funded childhood programs in Philadelphia and Africa. After he resigned from the organization in 2021, it was re-named as "Uplift Malawi" with a new focus on building sustainable schools in Malawi.

In 2017, the Hamels donated their 32,000 sq ft (3,000 m^{2}) Missouri home, valued at an estimated $10 million, to Camp Barnabas, a Christian charity that runs camps for children with special needs and chronic illnesses. Hamels said in a statement, "There are tons of amazing charities in Southwest Missouri. Out of all of these, Barnabas really pulled on our heartstrings. Seeing the faces, hearing the laughter, reading the stories of the kids they serve; there is truly nothing like it. Barnabas makes dreams come true, and we felt called to help them in a big way."

Hamels and his wife officially divorced in 2024. Hamels became engaged to actress Rebekah Graf in February 2026.

== See also ==
- List of Major League Baseball annual shutout leaders
- List of Major League Baseball career strikeout leaders
- List of Major League Baseball no-hitters
- List of Major League Baseball pitchers who have thrown an immaculate inning
- List of Philadelphia Phillies award winners and league leaders
- List of Philadelphia Phillies no-hitters
- List of World Series starting pitchers

Awards and achievements
Preceded by Tom Gordon	Steve Carlton Most Valuable Pitcher; 2007–2008	Succeeded by Roy Halladay
Preceded by Tim Lincecum	No-hit game September 1, 2014 (with Diekman, Giles & Papelbon)	Succeeded by Jordan Zimmermann
Preceded by Max Scherzer	No-hitter pitcher July 25, 2015	Succeeded by Hisashi Iwakuma
Preceded by Zack Greinke	National League Pitcher of the Month; August 2018	Succeeded by Germán Márquez
