= Cliff Lee =

American baseball player (born 1978)

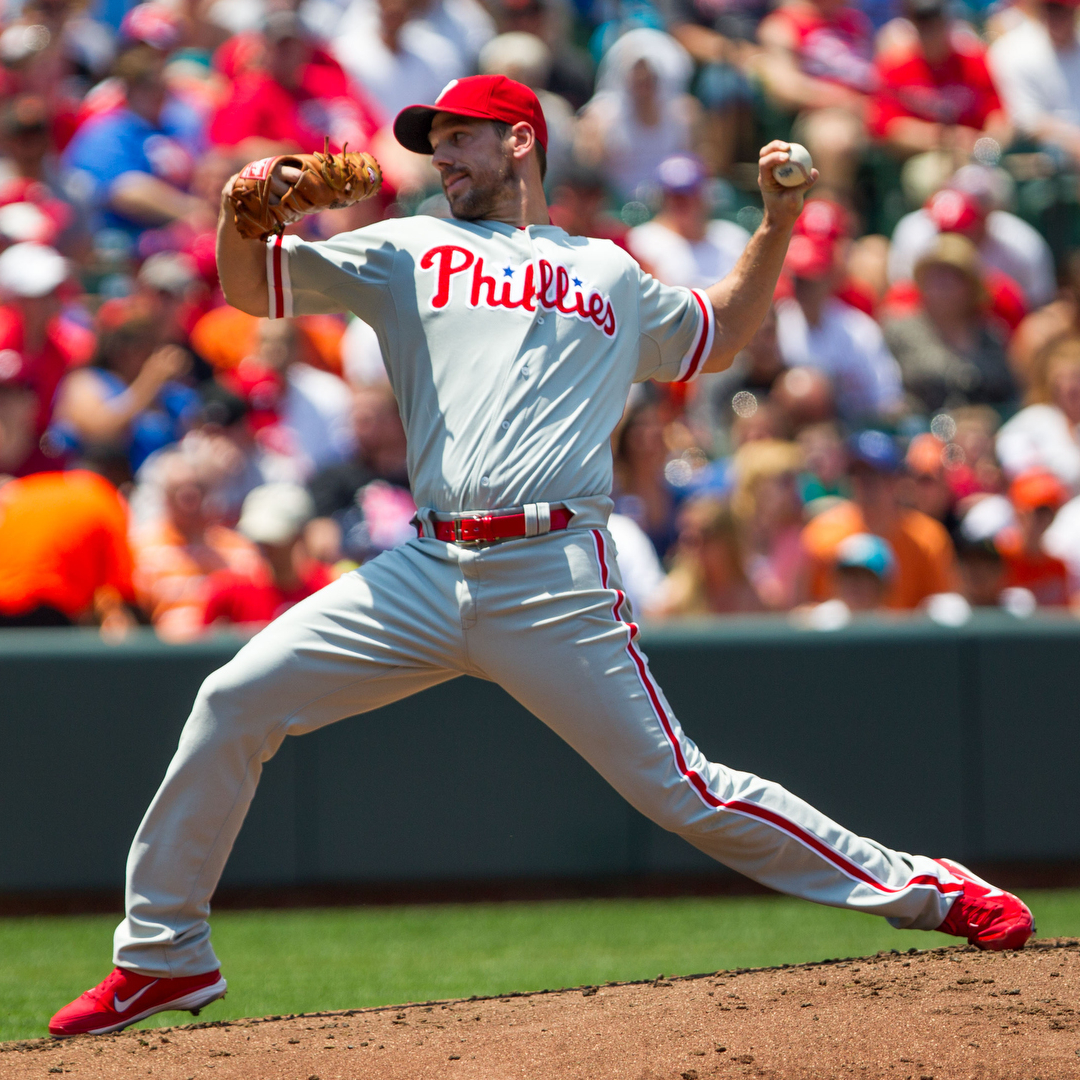
- Lee with the Phillies in 2012
- Pitcher
- Born: August 30, 1978 (age 48); Benton, Arkansas, U.S.
- Batted: Left Threw: Left

MLB debut
- September 15, 2002, for the Cleveland Indians

Last MLB appearance
- July 31, 2014, for the Philadelphia Phillies

MLB statistics
- Win–loss record: 143–91
- Earned run average: 3.52
- Strikeouts: 1,824
- Stats at Baseball Reference

Teams
- Cleveland Indians (2002–2009); Philadelphia Phillies (2009); Seattle Mariners (2010); Texas Rangers (2010); Philadelphia Phillies (2011–2014)

Career highlights and awards
- 4× All-Star (2008, 2010, 2011, 2013); AL Cy Young Award (2008); AL Comeback Player of the Year (2008); MLB wins leader (2008); AL ERA leader (2008)

Clifton Phifer Lee (born August 30, 1978) is an American former professional baseball starting pitcher who played for 13 seasons in Major League Baseball (MLB). Between 2002 and 2014 he played for the Cleveland Indians, Philadelphia Phillies, Seattle Mariners, and Texas Rangers. During his career, Lee was a member of four All-Star teams, won the Cy Young Award, and had consecutive World Series appearances in 2009 and 2010 with the Phillies and Rangers.

Born and raised in Benton, Arkansas, Lee's 91 mph (146 km/h) fastball attracted the attention of MLB scouts during his senior year at Benton High School in 1997, but he rejected draft offers twice in order to play college baseball for Meridian Community College and later the Arkansas Razorbacks. Lee finally came to terms with the Expos after his selection in the fourth round of the 2000 MLB draft, and he spent two years in their farm system before a trade to Cleveland in 2002. Lee made his MLB debut with his new team that year, and made his first opening day roster in 2004. His early years in Cleveland were marked by a number of temper flares, appearing to intentionally pitch at his opponents' heads and storming off of the mound, but by 2005, he was an established part of the Indians' starting rotation. The low point of his career, when he was sent back to the minor leagues in 2007, was followed by his Cy Young-winning season, during which he led the American League with a 2.54 earned run average and all of MLB with 22 wins.

The Indians sent Lee to the Phillies at the MLB trading deadline in 2009, and he helped the team reach their second consecutive World Series. There, Lee provided the team with their only two wins, including a 10-strikeout complete game, as Philadelphia lost to the New York Yankees in six games. That offseason, Philadelphia sent Lee to the Mariners as part of a larger deal to acquire Roy Halladay from the Toronto Blue Jays. He was traded again that season, this time to the Rangers, with whom he reached another World Series. There, both of his matchups with fellow ace Tim Lincecum were losses for Lee, and the Rangers lost to the San Francisco Giants.

After the 2010 season, Lee turned down a contract offer from the Yankees in order to rejoin the Phillies, where he became part of the "Four Aces" starting rotation alongside Halladay, Cole Hamels, and Roy Oswalt. Although he received two more All-Star selections, the remainder of Lee's time in Philadelphia was marked by poor run support, and he did not reach the postseason again after 2011. In 2014, Lee suffered a torn common flexor tendon in his pitching arm and, despite hopes that he would recover without surgery, he did not pitch again. Lee's professional baseball tenure was marked by his strong pitch command despite a comparatively low velocity, as well as by his composure in high-stress situations, the latter albeit complicated by his sometimes quick temper.

== Early life and college career ==
Clifton Phifer Lee was born on August 30, 1978, in Benton, Arkansas, to Steve and Sharon Lee. His father was a local firefighter and one-time city council member. He was named Clifton after his maternal grandfather, while Phifer was his mother's maiden name. Both of his parents were high school athletes: Steve was a wide receiver for the football team at Benton High School, while Sharon, despite missing one hand from a birth defect, was a pitcher for a local softball team. Although he also played football and basketball, Lee's primary focus in high school was on baseball, where his former coach described him as a hard thrower who had trouble with his pitch command. College baseball coach Norm DeBriyn referred to Lee as a "can't-miss guy" upon seeing him pitch in high school, describing him as "a big left-hander that threw hard". He was able to increase his strikeouts and decrease his walk ratio over the course of his high school career, and pitched two no-hitters as a senior.

That year, Lee attracted attention from professional baseball scouts for his 91 mph (146 km/h) fastball, even after a shoulder injury forced him off of the pitcher's mound and into the outfield. He was selected out of high school by the Florida Marlins of Major League Baseball (MLB) in the eighth round (246th overall) of the 1997 Major League Baseball draft, but failed to reach contract terms with the team and instead played college baseball for Meridian Community College. Originally, he had committed to play for the University of Arkansas at Little Rock, but reneged when he learned that NCAA Division I baseball players were ineligible for the MLB draft until their junior year. Following his freshman season in Meridian, Lee was drafted again, this time by the Baltimore Orioles in the 20th round (609th overall) of the 1998 MLB draft, but he again chose not to sign. In 2000, Lee accepted a scholarship offer to play college baseball for the Arkansas Razorbacks as a junior. His season fell below expectations, with Lee posting a 4–3 win–loss record and a 4.46 earned run average (ERA) in 16 games (nine starts), as well as 45 hits, 77 strikeouts, and 52 walks in 64 1/3 innings pitched. Lee also ran into issues with his pitching stamina, which forced him to occasionally pitch out of the bullpen.

== Professional baseball career ==
=== Montreal Expos organization (2000–02) ===
The Montreal Expos of MLB selected Lee in the fourth round (105th overall) of the 2000 MLB draft. Joe Jordan, the scout who saw Lee pitch at Arkansas, noted that he had an undeveloped pitch repertoire and a high walk rate, but was impressed by his competitive nature. After signing with Montreal, Lee was assigned to the Single-A Cape Fear Crocs of the South Atlantic League, a minor-league affiliate of the Expos. There, he struck out 63 batters in 44 2/3 innings, but an inconsistent delivery also led to 36 walks, 50 hits, and a 5.24 ERA. There were also concerns going forward about Lee's lack of stamina, which had followed from his college career.

Lee spent the entire 2001 season with the Class A-Advanced Jupiter Hammerheads of the Florida State League during their final year as an affiliate of the Expos. He frequently clashed with Jupiter pitching coach Ace Adams over how far he was going in games: Lee wanted to pitch a complete game in every start, and he became upset when Adams responded to Lee's arm fatigue by placing him on rest for several weeks. Despite their disagreements, it was under Adams' tutelage that Lee developed his cut fastball, which he had not thrown before joining the Hammerheads. Lee started 21 games for Jupiter, posting a 6–7 record and a 2.79 ERA while striking out 129 batters in 109 2/3 innings. His performance with Jupiter earned Lee a promotion to the Double-A Harrisburg Senators for the 2002 season. He made 15 starts there, posting a 7–2 record and a 3.23 ERA.

=== Cleveland Indians (2002–09) ===
==== Early years: 2002–2004 ====
On June 27, 2002, Lee was part of a six-player trade-deadline deal between the Expos and the Cleveland Indians. The Expos, who were making a push for the 2002 MLB playoffs, acquired Cleveland ace Bartolo Colón, pitching prospect Tim Drew, and cash from the Indians, while Cleveland received Lee, minor-league shortstop Brandon Phillips, outfield prospect Grady Sizemore, and first baseman Lee Stevens. After making only three starts with the Double-A Akron Aeros, during which he went 2–1 with a 5.40 ERA and struck out 18 batters in 16 2/3 innings, Lee was promoted to the Triple-A Buffalo Bisons of the International League.

Lee made his major-league debut on September 15, 2002, where he took the loss against the Minnesota Twins. He was able to take a shutout into the sixth inning before pitch-count limitations pulled him out of the game. The shutout bid came to an end when Cristian Guzman, who Lee had left on third base, scored on a sacrifice fly from Matt LeCroy; the Indians ultimately lost 5–0. Minnesota's victory clinched their first playoff berth since 1991. Lee had one other major-league start that season, earning a no decision after allowing one run in five innings of Cleveland's 3–2 loss to the Kansas City Royals. In addition to his two Cleveland starts, Lee started a total of 26 minor-league games across Harrisburg, Akron, and Buffalo. He went 12–5 in those starts with a 3.64 ERA, and struck out 153 batters in 146 innings.

At the start of spring training in 2003, Lee suffered an abdominal strain that kept him from the mound through the start of the regular season. He was officially transferred to the 60-day disabled list after spring training ended and before the start of the season. The strain, compounded by an additional sports hernia, kept Lee from pitching between March 28 and May 20. After undergoing a Double-A rehabilitation assignment, Lee began the 2003 season in Buffalo, with no expectation that he would rejoin the major leagues. He was recalled to Cleveland for the first game of a doubleheader on June 30, 2003. He picked up his first major-league win in that game, taking a three-hitter into the seventh inning of a 10–5 victory over the Kansas City Royals. Afterwards, Lee and Brad Voyles were sent back down to Buffalo to continue their development. He was recalled again on August 16, taking injured reliever Jason Boyd's position in the Indians' 25-man roster when Boyd suffered from shoulder tendinitis. Lee impressed in his third start of the season, allowing only two runs while striking out seven batters in eight innings of an 8–3 win against the Tampa Bay Rays. Indians manager Eric Wedge praised Lee's performance in the game, telling reporters, "He has a tremendous focus out there and on top of that he's a competitor." Lee made a total of nine major-league starts in his rookie season, going 3–3 with a 3.61 ERA while striking out 44 batters in 52 1/3 innings. In his 14 minor-league starts, meanwhile, he went 7–1 with a 2.82 ERA. After the MLB season ended in October, Lee underwent surgery in Philadelphia for his sports hernia. While recovering from surgery at the hospital, he met his future teammate Roy Oswalt, who was recovering from a groin injury.

Lee began the 2004 MLB season in the Indians' starting rotation, the first time that he had made an opening-day MLB roster. He picked up his first win of the season on April 12, pitching six innings in Cleveland's 6–3 home opener against the Minnesota Twins. Lee began the year with a 5–0 record, taking his first loss of the season on June 3, when he allowed three runs over 6 2/3 innings of a 5–2 loss to the Anaheim Angels, raising his ERA from 2.87 to 3.27 in the process. In his next start on June 13, Lee was ejected in the fourth inning after throwing what home plate umpire Matt Hollowell believed was a beanball at Ken Griffey Jr. of the Cincinnati Reds. Griffey had hit his 499th career home run off of Lee the inning prior, which Lee said made it "obviously [look] like I was throwing at him" in his next at-bat. Lee maintained that the pitch was accidental, while Griffey refused to comment on whether or not he believed Lee was intentionally throwing at his head. MLB suspended Lee for six games for the incident, a decision which Lee said he intended to appeal. At the time of the suspension, Lee had been quarantining in the team's hotel out of concern that he contracted chickenpox from his then-two-year-old son Jaxon. On the advice of Wedge, Lee ultimately agreed to drop the appeal of his suspension, as the team had a conveniently placed day off that would allow them to keep their rotation as is.

After starting the season 10–1 in his first 19 games, Lee failed to carry his momentum through the second half of the season, falling into a six-game slump between July 21 and September 2, during which he carried a 10.51 ERA. His frustrations came to a head on August 3, when Lee allowed six runs (two earned) in 4 1/3 innings to the Toronto Blue Jays before throwing his hat and glove into the stands and storming to the bench. Lee snapped his losing streak on September 8, allowing four earned runs in five innings of a 9–5 victory over the Seattle Mariners. It was his first win in 10 starts since July 16, when Cleveland defeated Seattle 18–6. Lee won again on September 23, helping the Indians to a 9–7 victory over Minnesota despite allowing five runs in 5 2/3 innings. After the game, Lee described his own season performance as going "from doing real good to real bad", and that he needed to "figure out how to cut those [losing] stretches short". He was able to finish the season strong, winning the last game of the season 5–2 against Minnesota and tying Jake Westbrook for the most wins that season on the Indians pitching staff. Lee finished the season 14–8 with a 5.43 ERA in 33 starts, striking out 161 batters in 179 innings while allowing 30 home runs, 108 earned runs, and 188 hits.

==== Breakout seasons: 2005–2006 ====
One of the strengths the Indians boasted during the 2005 MLB season was their consistent pitching staff, both starting and in the bullpen. Lee was the No. 4 starter that season, behind Kevin Millwood, Jake Westbrook, and CC Sabathia, and ahead of Scott Elarton. A flu-like illness gripped the Indians at the start of the year, and Lee took his first win of the season by pitching seven scoreless innings against the Kansas City Royals while attempting not to vomit on the mound. The team recovered for a strong start to the season: by June 17, the Indians pitching staff had a collective 3.56 ERA, and Lee was 7–3 with a 3.09 ERA. He registered his first complete game that July, albeit in a five-inning rain-shortened 6–2 win over the Royals. Lee's nine-game winning streak, beginning on July 8, was snapped on September 29, when he took the loss in a 1–0 pitchers' duel with Seth McClung of the Tampa Bay Devil Rays. Despite hopes that the team would make the postseason, a series of losses in September meant that Cleveland missed the AL Wild Card, which went to the Boston Red Sox, by only two games. Lee went 18–5 with a 3.79 ERA in 32 starts while striking out 143 batters in 202 innings. His 18 wins led all American League (AL) left-handed pitchers, while Lee led all of MLB with a .783 winning percentage. He also came in fourth in voting for the AL Cy Young Award, an honor which went to Bartolo Colón of the Anaheim Angels. (Note: Mariano Rivera of the New York Yankees and Johan Santana of the Minnesota Twins were second and third in voting, respectively.) During the offseason, Lee underwent a follow-up arthroscopy for the sports hernia surgery he had undergone two years prior.

Lee opened the 2006 season as the Indians' No. 3 starter, behind Sabathia and Westbrook and ahead of Paul Byrd and Jason Johnson. Lee was in the final year of his contract. That changed on August 9, when he signed a three-year, $14 million contract extension with the Indians, avoiding contract arbitration and allowing general manager Mark Shapiro to maintain control over another core player. What seemed poised to be another successful season for Lee took a turn after the All-Star Game break. After going 6–1 with a 3.76 ERA in eight starts from June 3 to July 19, Lee allowed six runs and seven hits in a 7–5 loss to the Angels, a loss that was part of a larger five-game losing streak for Cleveland. Across July and August, Lee endured a 2–5 skid with three no decisions and a 4.78 ERA. He became frustrated with himself on August 28, when he allowed five runs, including three home runs, in only 5 2/3 innings against the Tigers. In addition to being displeased with lasting fewer than six innings, he told reporters after the game that allowing so many home runs was "not acceptable". Although Lee and the Indians failed to capture their previous season highs, with Cleveland finishing the year 78–84 and Lee going 14–11 in 33 starts, the pitcher did manage to register one accomplishment: on October 1, his final start of the year, Lee pitched his first nine-inning complete game, a 6–3 defeat of the Tampa Bay Devil Rays. He finished the year with a 4.40 ERA and 129 strikeouts in 200 2/3 innings.

==== Minor-league setback: 2007 ====
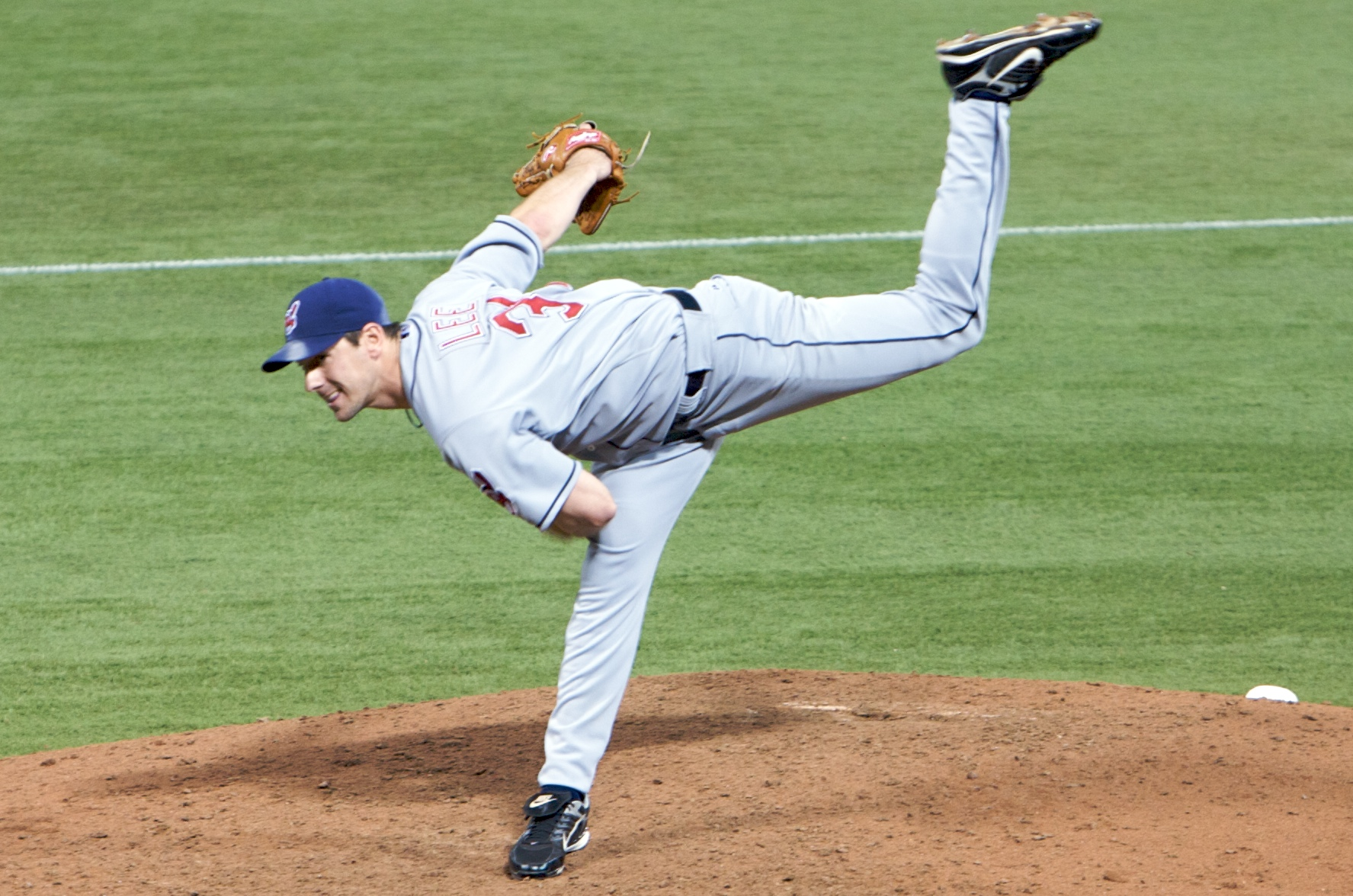
Lee with the Indians in 2008

Lee began the 2007 season on the disabled list after suffering a strained right abdominal muscle during spring training. He made his first start of the year on May 3, allowing five runs over six innings in an eventual 6–5 defeat of the Toronto Blue Jays. Although the Indians told reporters that Lee had not suffered any lingering physical difficulties from his early-season injury, he struggled on the mound, going 5–8 with a 6.38 ERA in 16 starts. This included three consecutive starts where he allowed seven or more runs. On July 21, Lee came under fire for hitting Sammy Sosa of the Texas Rangers in the head during a game meant to honor Sosa's 600th home run. Catcher Victor Martinez verbally confronted Lee between innings, and the Indians held a 25-minute players-only meeting after the 8–5 loss. After allowing eight runs in a 14–9 loss to the Boston Red Sox in his next start on July 26, Lee was optioned to the Triple-A Buffalo Bisons.

Lee used the demotion to retool his pitching repertoire, moving his fastball and changeup to the outside corner while developing a cutter inspired by that of Mariano Rivera. He was a September call-up for Cleveland, but was relegated to the bullpen for the final month of the season, and was not included on the Indians' postseason roster. He expressed motivation to focus on improvement after seeing Cleveland drop four games to the Boston Red Sox in the 2007 American League Championship Series (ALCS), telling reporters, "I would have liked to have had a shot at one of those last three games, but we lost them all and I didn't pitch in any of them." Lee went 5–8 in 20 appearances (16 starts) for the Indians, posting a 6.29 ERA and striking out 66 batters in 97 1/3 innings. He also pitched in 10 minor-league games, going 2–3 with a 3.00 ERA and 61 strikeouts in 48 innings.

==== Cy Young Award and aftermath: 2008–2009 ====
To prepare for the 2008 season, Lee spent time training with the Indians' pitching coach, Carl Willis, at the latter's offseason home in Raleigh, North Carolina. After honing his mechanics there and impressing during spring training, Lee beat out Jeremy Sowers and Aaron Laffey for the fifth spot in the Cleveland starting rotation. His first start of the season was a marked departure from the year prior: going toe-to-toe with Oakland Athletics ace Joe Blanton, Lee allowed only four hits and one unearned run in 6 2/3 innings of the 2–1 victory. He pitched his first MLB complete-game shutout with a 2–0 victory over the Kansas City Royals on April 25, throwing 120 pitches and dropping to a 0.28 ERA. With a 5–0 record and 32 strikeouts in April, Lee was named the AL Pitcher of the Month. By mid-May, his ERA was only 0.67, and Lee faced the first challenge of his season with a 6–4 loss to Edinson Volquez and the Cincinnati Reds. Lee took the setback poorly, telling reporters, "Everything that happened in the past doesn't really matter ... I made a couple of bad pitches and we lost."

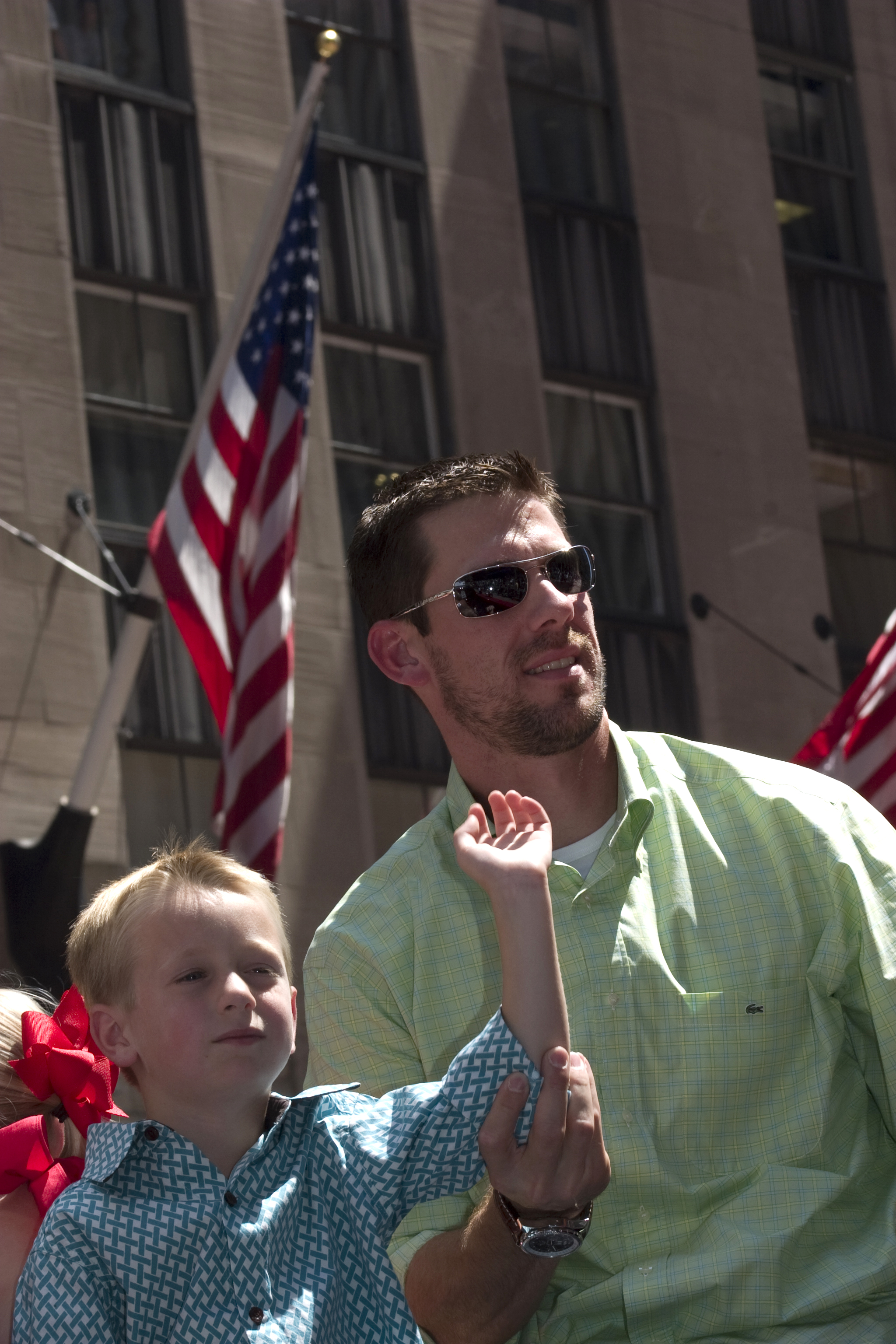
Lee at the 2008 All-Star Game parade

With a 12–2 record and 2.31 ERA by July, Lee was not only named to his first MLB All-Star Game in 2008, but was given the nod to start the game as the AL pitcher. He pitched the first two innings, striking out three and giving up only one hit, a single to Chipper Jones. Lee continued to dominate over the second half of the season. His 19th win of the season, a 10–4 victory over the Tigers on August 26, broke his previous season high, and on September 1, he became the first Indian to win 20 games in one season since Gaylord Perry in 1974. With a 22–2 record on September 13, Lee became the first pitcher whose win–loss differential for a season was +20 since Bob Welch went 27–6 for Oakland in 1990. At that point, he had not lost a game since July 11. Despite Lee leading the AL in ERA and all of MLB in wins, the Indians finished in third place in the AL Central and did not reach the playoffs.

Had Lee not lost his last start of the year, he would have become the first (and to date, only), pitcher ever with at least a .900 winning percentage, and at least 20 wins in a season. With a 22–3 record and 2.54 ERA in 31 starts, including four complete games and two shutouts, as well as 170 strikeouts in 223 1/3 innings, Lee capped off the 2008 season with a number of awards. First, the Indians gave him both the BBWAA Man of the Year Award and the Gordon Cobbledick Golden Tomahawk Award. After the Sporting News named Lee their AL Pitcher of the Year and Comeback Player of the Year, he also picked up Players Choice Awards for both Outstanding Pitcher and Comeback Player. MLB also awarded Lee with their Comeback Player of the Year award for going from a 6.29 to a 2.54 ERA between 2007 and 2008. Finally, on November 13, Lee received the AL Cy Young Award, following CC Sabathia as the second Indians left-hander in a row to take home the award.

Following his Cy Young-winning year, as well as the offseason departure of Sabathia, Lee entered the 2009 MLB season as Cleveland's ace, anchoring a rotation that also included Roberto Hernández (then known as Fausto Carmona), free-agent newcomer Carl Pavano, and rookies Scott Lewis and Anthony Reyes. There was some concern about Lee's spring-training performance, during which he allowed 46 hits in 21 2/3 innings for a 12.46 ERA. His struggles continued into the opening-day game against the Texas Rangers, when Lee allowed seven runs in five innings of a 9–1 loss. His wins with Cleveland came on roughly a monthly basis: April 16 against the Yankees, May 13 against the Chicago White Sox, June 14 against the St. Louis Cardinals, and July 16 against the Seattle Mariners. Most of Lee's difficulties came not from his own pitching, but from poor run support: in 11 of his first 20 starts for the season, the Indians scored three or fewer runs. In his June 14 start, Lee carried a no-hitter into the eighth inning before Yadier Molina recorded a double. He made 22 starts for the Indians in 2009, during which he went 7–9 with a 3.14 ERA and 107 strikeouts in 152 innings.

=== Philadelphia Phillies (2009) ===
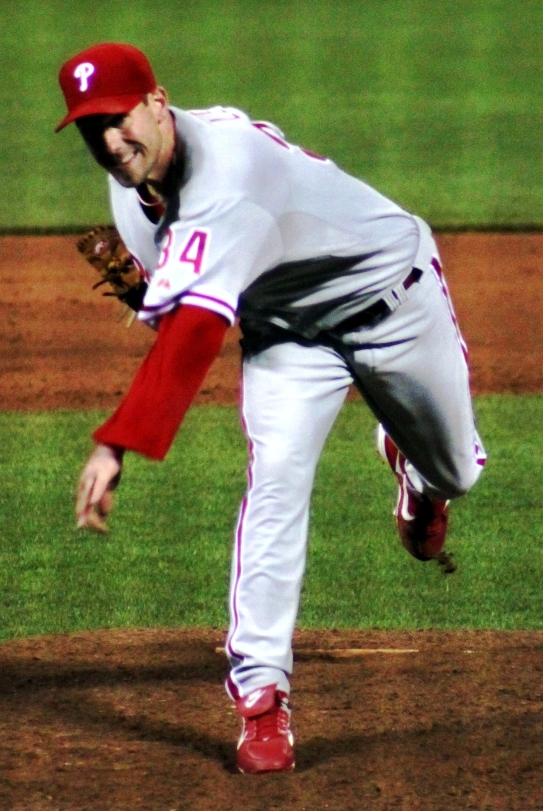
Lee during his first tenure with the Phillies in 2009

On July 29, two days before the MLB trading deadline, the Indians traded Lee to the Philadelphia Phillies in exchange for four prospects: Carlos Carrasco, Jason Knapp, Lou Marson, and Jason Donald. The Phillies had previously attempted to trade for Roy Halladay of the Toronto Blue Jays, but were unwilling to part with the players that Toronto was asking for in return. In his first start for his new team, Lee carried a no-hitter into the sixth inning and finished with a complete-game 5–1 victory over the San Francisco Giants. Although he was dominant in his first five starts, taking the win in all and dropping his ERA down to 0.68, Lee struggled through his next seven appearances with Philadelphia, going 2–4 with a 6.13 ERA. Lee finished out the regular season with 12 National League (NL) starts, including three complete games, during which he went 7–4 with a 3.39 ERA and 74 strikeouts in 79 2/3 innings.

The Phillies clinched their third consecutive NL East title and playoff berth on September 30 with a 10–3 victory over the Houston Astros. Lee was selected over fellow ace Cole Hamels to start Game 1 of the 2009 National League Division Series against the Colorado Rockies. He pitched a six-hit complete game in the 5–1 victory, striking out five, walking none, and getting a hit of his own. Lee got the start again in Game 4 for a rematch against Colorado ace Ubaldo Jimenez. Although Lee pitched 7 1/3 innings, he was pulled in favor of Ryan Madson with the score 2–1 after a walk and an error put Dexter Fowler in scoring position. Madson allowed three runs but was credited with the win following a late-game Philadelphia rally. The Phillies won 5–4 to advance to the NL Championship Series (NLCS), where they faced the Los Angeles Dodgers. The Phillies took Game 3 11–0 behind a standout performance from Lee, who went eight innings without issuing a run or walk and allowed only three hits. By the time the Phillies clinched their second consecutive appearance in the World Series, Lee had a 0.74 ERA through 24 1/3 innings in the first three postseason starts of his career.

==== 2009 World Series ====
Lee opened the 2009 World Series with a matchup against his former teammate, CC Sabathia, who was now playing with the New York Yankees. Missing the team bus, Lee was nearly late to the game, with his taxi stuck in New York City traffic, and ended up taking the New York City Subway to Yankee Stadium. However, Lee was unfazed and only allowed six hits and one unearned run in a 10-strikeout complete game that the Phillies won 6–1. His feat lowered his postseason ERA to 0.54, dropping below Mariano Rivera's 0.77 record, and Lee became the first pitcher in MLB history to strike out 10 batters while issuing no walks or earned runs in a World Series game. (Note: The Yankees' one run came on an error from shortstop Jimmy Rollins.) Lee took the win again in Game 5, outpitching A. J. Burnett, who lasted only two innings, but ran into struggles of his own by giving up five runs in seven innings of the Phillies' 8–6 win. The Phillies battled the Yankees to six games, but ultimately lost Game 6 by a score of 7–3.

=== Seattle Mariners (2010) ===
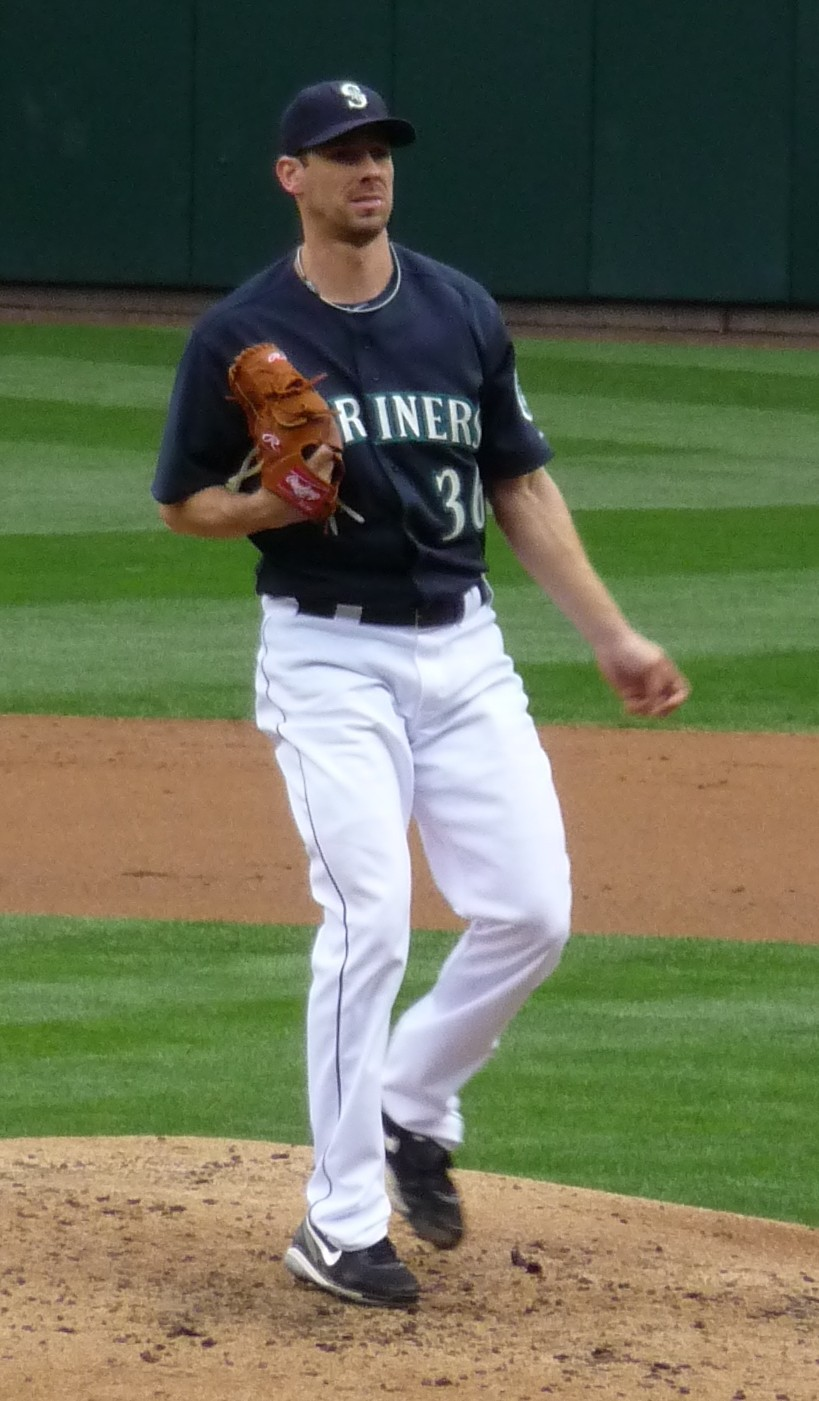
Lee with the Mariners in 2010

On December 16, 2009, the Phillies traded Lee to the Seattle Mariners in exchange for three prospects: right-handed pitchers Phillippe Aumont and J. C. Ramírez, and outfielder Tyson Gillies. The Mariners had devoted their offseason to acquiring a strong starting pitcher, and had initially pursued Rich Harden, who was acquired as a free agent by the Texas Rangers. Phillies general manager Ruben Amaro Jr. offered to trade Lee to Seattle if he and the Phillies could successfully acquire Halladay from the Blue Jays. Lee was taken by surprise upon hearing of the trade, which had occurred amidst talks of a contract extension with the Phillies, but said he understood why Philadelphia would take "an opportunity to get the best pitcher in baseball" instead. The Halladay—Lee switch was the first time in MLB history that two Cy Young-winning pitchers had been traded on the same day. That February, Lee underwent foot surgery to remove a bone spur that had broken loose. The surgery was considered minor, and Mariners general manager Jack Zduriencik expressed confidence that it would not impede Lee's preparation for the upcoming season.

Lee's notorious short temper appeared to return during spring training, when he was suspended for five regular-season games after throwing a fastball over the head of opposing catcher Chris Snyder during an exhibition game against the Arizona Diamondbacks on March 15. Zduriencik told reporters that he expected Lee, who the Mariners intended to pair with ace Felix Hernandez at the top of the starting rotation, would appeal the decision. Upon appeal, the suspension and fine were rescinded on April 21, with Lee and the Mariners' head athletic trainer successfully arguing that the throw was not intentional. Rather, Lee's recovery from foot surgery, as well as the abdominal strain that he had suffered earlier in the game during a collision with Snyder, had caused Lee to throw a wild pitch. Lee had been placed on the 15-day disabled list for the abdominal strain on April 4, retroactive to March 26, causing him to miss the start of the 2010 MLB season. He returned to the mound on April 30, 2010, earning a no decision by striking out eight Rangers in seven innings. The game went into extra innings before Elvis Andrus scored on a wild pitch from Mariners reliever Brandon League, allowing Texas to take the game 2–0 in the 12th inning. Lee's first win with the Mariners came on May 11, when he allowed one run in 7 1/3 innings of a 5–1 victory over the Baltimore Orioles.

Lee proved an overall success in Seattle, posting an 8–3 record and 2.34 ERA in 13 starts, as well as 0.5 walks per nine innings. His longevity on the mound proved to be a particular asset; on June 30, with a 7–4 defeat of the New York Yankees, Lee pitched his third complete game in a row. He was the first MLB pitcher to do so since his former teammate CC Sabathia in 2008, and the first Mariner since Randy Johnson in 1998. That month, he received his second career AL Pitcher of the Month title. Despite his prowess on the mound, Seattle quickly fell behind in the AL West. By June 18, the Mariners were 16 games under .500 and 12 1/2 games behind in the pennant race.

=== Texas Rangers (2010) ===
As the Mariners' season broke down, with the team 13 games behind in the AL West by mid-June, Lee became an acquisition target for multiple teams trying to improve their starting pitching before the MLB trading deadline. The New York Yankees were in talks to acquire Lee by sending catcher Jesus Montero, second baseman David Adams, and pitching prospect Zach McAllister to Seattle. The deal fell through, however, after Adams suffered a sprained ankle. The Mariners used the injury to attempt to restructure the trade package, but Yankees general manager Brian Cashman refused, effectively killing the trade. On July 9, 2010, the same day negotiations fell through with the Yankees, the Texas Rangers reached an agreement to trade first baseman Justin Smoak, prospects Blake Beavan, Josh Lueke, and Matthew Lawson, and $2.25 million to Seattle in exchange for Lee.

Although Lee had been selected to appear in the 2010 MLB All-Star Game with the Mariners, the timing of his trade meant that he represented the Rangers when he pitched for the AL team on July 13, retiring Martin Prado, Albert Pujols, and Ryan Howard in a six-pitch fourth inning. Shortly afterwards, on August 6, Lee went eight innings in a 5–1 victory over the Oakland Athletics before Frank Francisco relieved him for a scoreless ninth inning. He started a total of 15 regular-season games for the Rangers, going 4–6 with an ERA of 3.98 and striking out 96 batters in 108 2/3 innings of work. In addition to his performance on the mound, Lee's teammates and managers told The Athletic that they appreciated his clubhouse presence. Teammate Colby Lewis referred to the back half of the season as "relaxed fun", as the addition of Lee gave them confidence that "If we lost one or two, it was like, 'So what? Who cares? We're gonna go win the next seven.'"

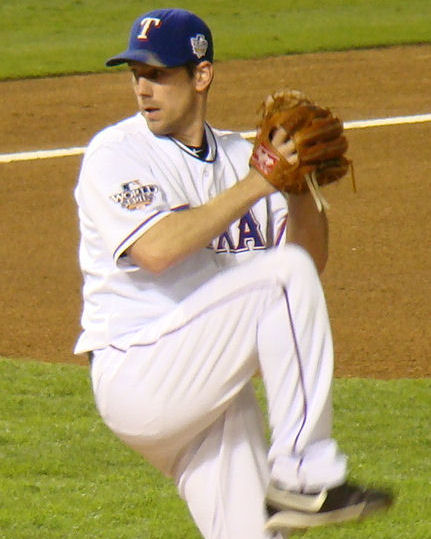
Lee pitching in Game 5 of the 2010 World Series

The Rangers clinched the AL West title and their first postseason berth in 11 years on September 25, 2010, in a 4–3 defeat of the Athletics. The Rangers faced the Tampa Bay Rays in the 2010 American League Division Series (ALDS), with Lee starting Game 1 against Tampa Bay ace David Price. Lee was dominant in the seven innings he pitched of the 5–1 victory, striking out 10 while allowing only five hits, including a Ben Zobrist solo home run. Although he had previously said he would use a three-person starting rotation "if we think we need [Lee]", Ron Washington ultimately opted not to let his ace pitch on short rest, instead starting Tommy Hunter for Game 4. Instead, Game 5 proved a rematch between Lee and Price, with Lee striking out 11 and allowing only one unearned run in a complete game 5–1 victory that allowed the Rangers to capture a playoff series for the first time in franchise history. The Rangers faced the Yankees in the 2010 American League Championship Series (ALCS). Lee started Game 3, striking out 13 and allowing only two hits in eight innings of an 8–0 rout of New York and Andy Pettitte. It was only the second time in postseason history that the Yankees' opposing pitcher gave up two or fewer hits while pitching eight or more innings; Warren Spahn did the same in Game 4 of the 1958 World Series. The Rangers defeated the Yankees in six games, leading to their first franchise World Series appearance.

==== 2010 World Series ====
Pitching on eight days' rest following the ALCS, Lee was given the start for Game 1 of the 2010 World Series. The game, in which Lee faced Giants ace Tim Lincecum, was predicted to be a pitchers' duel. Instead, the Giants won 11–7, with the teams combining for 18 runs, 25 hits, 10 extra-base hits, and 6 errors. A total of 12 pitchers made an appearance in Game 1. Lee lasted only 4 2/3 innings, giving up seven runs on 104 pitches in the process. As a batter, he also scored an RBI double in the second inning, giving the Rangers an early 2–0 lead that they were unable to hold. It was the first time in nine games that Lee's team had lost one of his postseason starts. He expressed frustration with his own performance, telling reporters after the game, "I was missing on everything. It's unacceptable."

With the Rangers down 3–1 in the series, Game 5 proved to be a rematch between Lincecum and Lee, with the latter terming the match "a chance to redeem [himself]". Lee and Lincecum held each other's teams scoreless for six innings, with Nelson Cruz robbing Buster Posey of a home run in the process. In the seventh inning, however, Lee allowed both Cody Ross and Juan Uribe to single before Edgar Renteria hit a three-run home run. Those were the only runs allowed by the Rangers, who scored once on a solo home run from Cruz, but the Giants defeated the Rangers 3–1 for their first World Series title since 1954.

=== Second stint in Philadelphia (2011–2014) ===
==== "Four Aces" lineup: 2011 ====
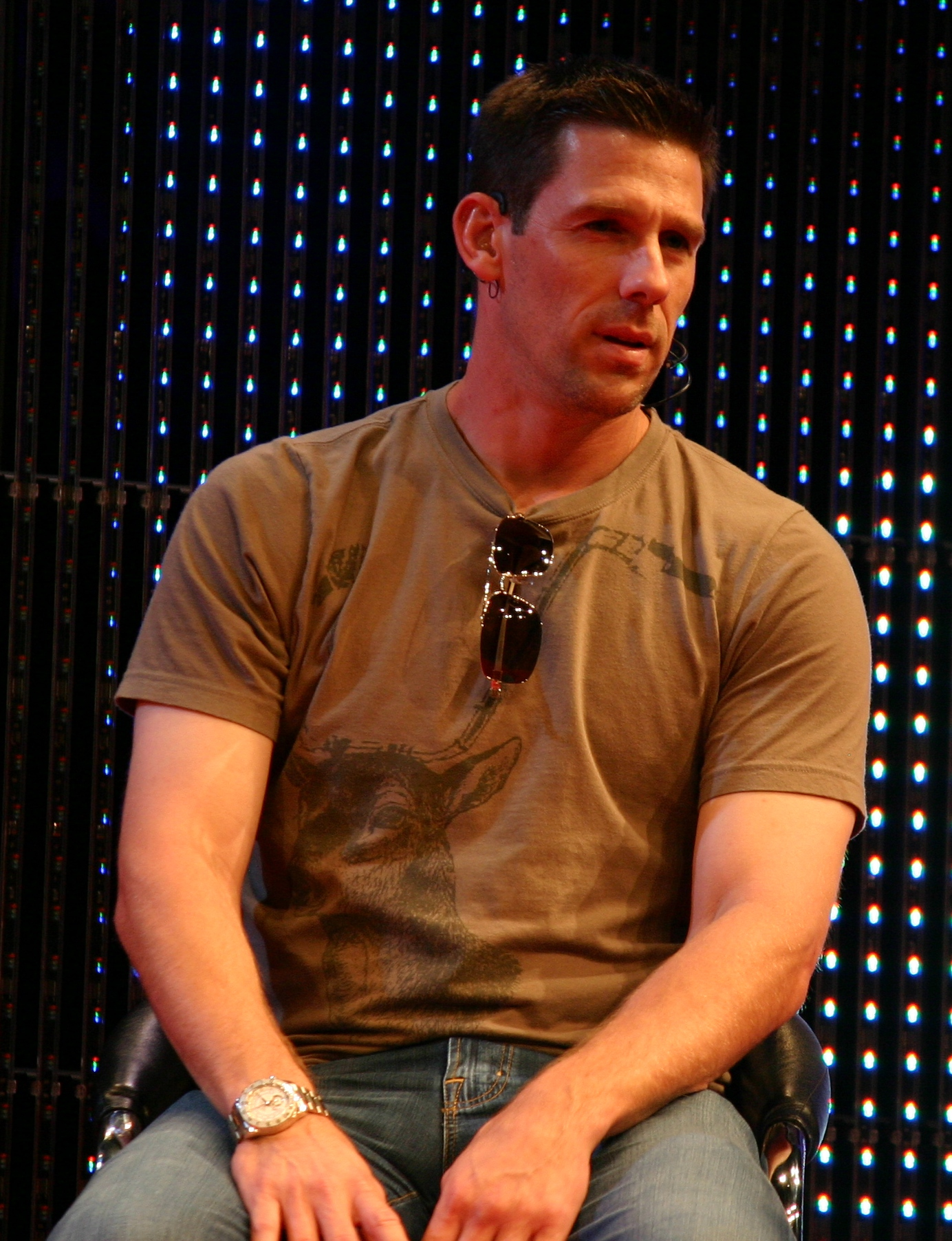
Lee in 2011

Despite being offered a seven-year, $150 million contract with the New York Yankees, Lee opted to sign with the Phillies on December 14, 2010, taking their offer of five years at a total of $120 million. The decision came as a surprise to many baseball analysts, who did not expect Lee to turn down an additional $30 million to return to Philadelphia. Throughout the 2010 Winter Meetings, Lee had been approached by the Rangers and the Yankees, but he told his agent Derek Braunecker that he desired an offer from the Phillies. Braunecker met with Philadelphia assistant general manager Scott Proefrock, who agreed on the condition that Lee's interest in rejoining the team was genuine and not a tool to increase Lee's offers from other teams. Braunecker asked Proefrock if the Phillies would be willing to offer his client a five-year contract, saying, "We'll entertain anything". In an interview shortly after re-signing with the Phillies, Lee told The New York Times that his decision was "kind of a no-brainer", and that he "never wanted to leave in the first place".

He became part of a rotation known as the "Four Aces", consisting of Lee, Halladay, Hamels, and Oswalt. (Note: The team's fifth starter that season was Joe Blanton, who took his exclusion from the "Four Aces" lineup with humor. He told The Philadelphia Inquirer during spring training, "Hopefully the other lineup falls asleep and thinks they have to face these four guys, and I'll just kind of slip right in.") The rotation operated with only a loose order, with manager Charlie Manuel telling reporters, "We're going to have a No. 1 starter every day, so it really doesn't matter." In his first game back with the Phillies, Lee, who received a standing ovation from fans before taking the mound, had 11 strikeouts in seven innings of a 9–4 defeat of the Astros. He was named the NL Pitcher of the Month that June after going 5–0 with a 0.21 ERA and pitching all but three innings in those five starts. He also outscored his opponents as a batter, recording two runs batted in (RBI) but allowing only one run. Those were not the only offensive moments of Lee's season. He hit his first major-league home run on July 9, against Tommy Hanson of the Atlanta Braves. Although the Phillies lost 4–1, Lee's home run was the first by a Philadelphia pitcher since Chan Ho Park two years prior. He homered again on August 9, this time scoring the go-ahead run against Ted Lilly in a 2–1 defeat of the Dodgers.

Lee and Halladay were both selected for the 2011 All-Star Game, combining for nearly four perfect innings before Adrian Gonzalez of the Red Sox hit a solo home run against Lee. With 39 strikeouts, a 0.45 ERA, and only two earned runs over 39 2/3 innings in August, Lee notched his second NL Pitcher of the Month title and became the first pitcher in MLB history to have two months of five wins, no losses, and a sub-0.50 ERA. Lee and the Phillies continued their dominant run through the remainder of the season, and on September 26, Lee took the win in their 100th game of the season, a 4–2 defeat of the Braves. It was only the third time in franchise history that the Phillies had won 100 or more games in a season. He finished the year with a 17–8 record, 2.40 ERA, and 1.027 walks plus hits per inning pitched (WHIP) in 232 2/3 innings. His six shutouts tied Randy Johnson's 1998 season for the second-highest in MLB history. Lee finished third in NL Cy Young voting with 90 points and no first-place votes, behind winner Clayton Kershaw, who received 207 points and 27 first-place votes, and Halladay, who recorded 133 points and four first-place votes. Rotation mate Hamels followed in fifth place with 17 points, while Oswalt and Blanton were not finalists.

With 102 regular season wins and their strong pitching staff, the Phillies entered the 2011 postseason as heavy World Series favorites. They were upset, however, by the St. Louis Cardinals in Game 5 of the 2011 National League Division Series. Lee took the loss in his Game 2 start, blowing a four-run lead by allowing five runs and a career-high 12 hits in the 5–4 defeat. Lee said he took "full responsibility" for the loss, telling reporters, "They were hitting good pitches. They were hitting bad pitches. They were hitting."

==== Difficulties with run support: 2012–2013 ====
Oswalt was replaced with Vance Worley for the Phillies' 2012 starting rotation, but the Four Aces remained otherwise intact, with Lee as the No. 2 starter behind Halladay. Although Lee personally pitched well, he struggled to win games through the first half of the 2012 season, beginning with his first start, when he pitched 10 innings but took the loss in a 1–0 defeat to the San Francisco Giants. As of 2025, Lee remains the most recent MLB pitcher to pitch more than nine innings in a game. Some of his struggles came from poor run support, as the otherwise productive Phillies offense did not hit well when he was on the mound. He also faced pitch-count difficulties for the first time in his Philadelphia career: in one outing against the Boston Red Sox, Lee had thrown 66 pitches by the end of the third inning, as the Red Sox' hitters had fouled off a high percentage of his pitches. Both Lee and Manuel expressed confusion over Lee's struggles, and by the end of June, though was healthy and pitching well, he was allowing nine hits per nine innings. His first win of the season did not come until July 4, his last start before the All-Star break, when he allowed two runs on nine hits in eight innings of the Phillies' 9–2 win over the New York Mets. All nine of the Phillies' runs came in the final three innings of the game. His run of 13 starts without a win was the longest of any reigning Cy Young winner since Greg Maddux in 2008. Through those 13 starts, Lee posted a 0–5 record, and a difficult June in which he allowed 20 runs in 24 2/3 innings had lifted him from a 2.92 to 4.13 ERA. He seemed to recover through August and September, recording the 1,500th strikeout of his MLB career, also against the Mets, on September 17. Despite finishing the season with a 3.16 ERA, 207 strikeouts and a 7.39 strikeout-to-walk ratio in 211 innings, Lee went only 6–9 in his 30 starts, becoming the first pitcher in history to win fewer than eight games with 200 or more strikeouts and a 3.20 or below ERA. Despite Lee's hopes that the team would "win this division, make the post-season, and win the World Series", the Phillies missed the playoffs in 2012 with a 2–1 loss to the Miami Marlins on September 29, the 158th game of the season.

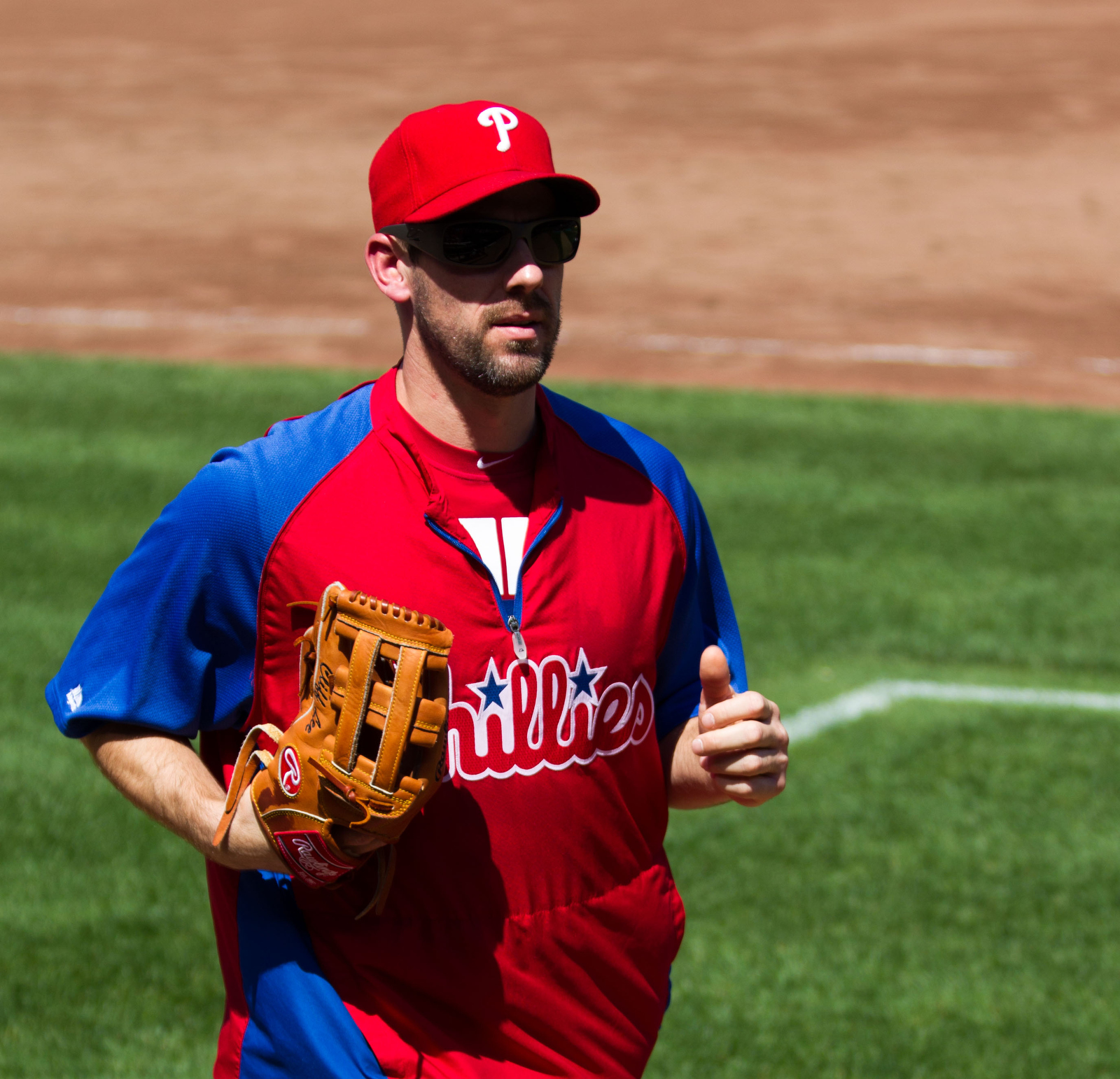
Lee with the Phillies in 2012

Lee entered the 2013 season as the Phillies' No. 3 starter behind Hamels and Halladay, and secured the team's first win of the year with eight scoreless innings in a 2–0 win over the Braves on April 4. His streak of 45 innings and 169 plate appearances without issuing a walk, dating back to July 2012, came to an end on April 15 when he walked Jay Bruce of the Cincinnati Reds. By mid-June, Lee, who was 8–2 with a 2.55 ERA but once again receiving little run support from his teammates, was beginning to show his frustration. When asked if he wanted to stay in Philadelphia, he told reporters, "I definitely want to win." Amidst a number of trade rumors, Lee made his fourth All-Star Game appearance, joining Domonic Brown as the Phillies' All-Star representatives. He missed two weeks after the All-Star break with a stiff neck, and upon his August 4 return, lasted only five innings, allowing four runs on eight hits in a 4–1 loss to the Braves.

The height of Lee's season came on September 16, when, in a 12–2 rout of the Miami Marlins, he crossed the 200-inning mark and the 200-strikeout mark for the third consecutive season and became the first Philadelphia pitcher to record 14 strikeouts in one game since Curt Schilling in 1997. In his last start of the season, Lee struck out another 13 batters but still took the loss in a 1–0 defeat at the hands of Craig Kimbrel and the Braves. Despite becoming the first pitcher in MLB history to strike out 50 or more batters in a month while walking only one, Lee expressed disappointment at another year away from the postseason, and told reporters that he wanted "to finish strong and take it to the house". In 31 starts for the Phillies that year, including two complete games, Lee went 14–8 with a 2.87 ERA and 222 strikeouts in 222 2/3 innings.

==== Injury and end of career: 2014–2015 ====
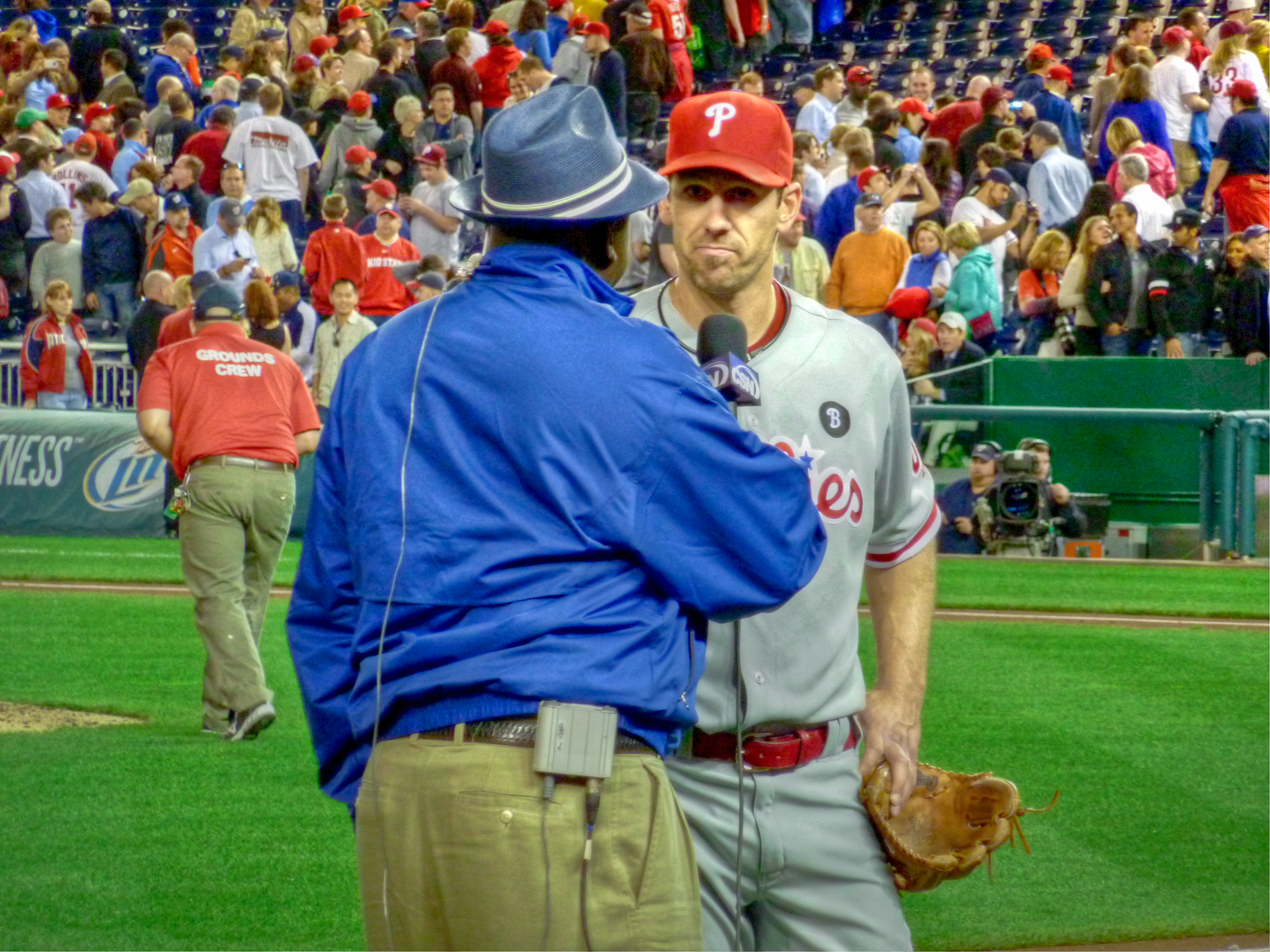
Cliff Lee interviewed by Gary Matthews in 2011

After Cole Hamels suffered a preseason injury, Lee was tapped to serve as the Phillies' 2014 opening-day starter, the second time in his career he'd earned the opening day nod. Facing Yu Darvish and the Rangers, Lee became the eighth pitcher in the live-ball era to be credited with a win despite giving up eight or more earned runs. (Note: The other seven are Petie Behan in 1923, Ray Kremer in 1930, Lee Pfund in 1945, Rick Rhoden in 1977, Cal Eldred in 1997, Woody Williams in 2001, and Andy Pettitte in 2007.) He gave up eight earned runs in five innings of the Phillies' 14–10 victory, a game which saw 31 hits between the two teams, and exited the game with a 14.40 ERA. After throwing 116 pitches against the Cincinnati Reds on May 18, Lee began to complain of elbow soreness, and was diagnosed with a strained pronator teres muscle in his left arm. Lee later said that he had begun to feel pain after throwing a career-high 128 pitches in a game against the Braves that April, but that it had mostly abated before the Reds game. It was the first arm injury of Lee's baseball career, professional or otherwise. He was meant to return to the mound on July 18 after a series of rehabilitation games for the Class-A Clearwater Threshers, but manager Ryne Sandberg chose to push Lee's return to July 21, which would give him seven days' rest rather than five. He struggled in this first start back, allowing six runs and a career-high-tying 12 hits in 5 2/3 innings against the Giants.

On July 31, Lee left his start against the Washington Nationals in the third inning with a recurrence of the muscle strain. On August 7, the Phillies shut Lee down for the season, in the hopes that he would be able to rest the elbow and return in time for spring training the following year. Pitching only 81 1/3 innings in 2014, Lee went 4–5 with a 3.65 ERA. It was the first time in six years that Lee had not crossed the 200-inning mark in a season. His elbow continued to bother him after the conclusion of the 2014 season, and he was diagnosed during the offseason with a tear in his left common flexor tendon, a career-threatening injury for the 36-year-old pitcher. On March 16, 2015, the Phillies placed Lee on the 60-day disabled list, and he returned home to Arkansas for rehabilitation. While doctors recommended surgery for the injury, Lee elected to make a third non-surgical rehabilitation attempt, in order to avoid the six to eight-month recovery time that a more intensive procedure would entail. Lee did not pitch professionally at all in 2015, and at the end of the season, the Phillies, who had the option of retaining him for another year at $27.5 million, bought out the remainder of his contract for $12.5 million.

=== Retirement ===
After the 2014 season, Lee had said that he would retire at the end of his contract with the Phillies. While waiting to hear whether his elbow injury would require surgery, he voiced concerns to Meghan Montemurro of USA Today that he might never pitch again. By December 2015, however, Lee had received medical clearance to play baseball, and his agent, Darek Braunecker, told reporters that he would pitch in the 2016 MLB season if he found "the right fit". The following month, Braunecker clarified that Lee was adjusting to full-time fatherhood, but that he retained an interest in pitching professionally again. On February 23, 2016, Braunecker announced that Lee would not pitch during the 2016 season. While not an official retirement, the announcement appeared to signal the end of Lee's professional baseball career. In his 13 seasons in MLB, Lee posted a 143–91 record with a 3.52 ERA, and struck out 1,824 batters.

Lee was one of 18 new nominees on the 2020 ballot for the National Baseball Hall of Fame. He appeared on two out of 397 ballots, falling short of the 5-percent voting threshold required to appear on subsequent ballots.

== Pitching style ==
By the end of his career, Lee had a four-pitch repertoire consisting of a fastball, cutter, changeup, and curveball. Of these, he considered his curveball to be his most effective pitch, but used it only sparingly, as he had better command of his other pitches. He also employed a slider, although he rarely included that pitch in discussions of his repertoire. David Murphy of the Philadelphia Daily News described Lee's slider interchangeably with his cutter as one primary type of breaking ball. He was not known as a power pitcher: in 2010, Lee's average fastball velocity was only 91.3 mph (146.9 km/h). in line with the MLB average from 2008 to 2015. Instead, he preferred to focus on accuracy and command, throwing the majority of his pitches for strikes. In 2012, Lee threw a strike on the first pitch to 71 percent of the batters that he faced, and he had the highest strikeout-to-walk ratio of any pitcher over the age of 33 since Curt Schilling in 2001 and 2002. His fastball in particular was difficult to hit, landing on the low inside corner of the strike zone. After his 2007 demotion to the minor leagues, Lee told Joe Jordan, then a scouting director for the Baltimore Orioles, that he had adopted a philosophy of throwing "Three pitches for strikes every night. That's the key."

In addition to his command of multiple varieties of pitch, Lee was also known for his consistent and methodical approach on the mound. Rangers reliever Darren O'Day referred to Lee as a "technician", because he would not become emotional or alter his rhythm under high-stress situations, such as when multiple runners were on base. His Phillies teammates and general manager both noted Lee's composure on the mound as one of his strengths, as it allowed him to retain control of the game. Despite this, Lee's stubborn personality sometimes led to a short temper, such as when he appeared to intentionally hit Sammy Sosa with a pitch or would argue with his catcher mid-game.

Having spent significant time in both leagues, Lee told reporters after his retirement that he preferred playing in the National League, in which the pitcher batted (at that time) instead of being replaced by a designated hitter. This preference was both because Lee enjoyed hitting, despite his career batting average of .175, and because he preferred games where he faced the opposing team's pitcher.

== Personal life ==
Lee met his future wife Kristen when they were in middle school, he in the seventh grade and she in the sixth. While the pair were high school acquaintances, they did not start dating until Lee was in college.

They married in 2000, and have two children together, son Jaxon, followed by daughter Maci. Jaxon was diagnosed with infant leukemia when he was four months old. In 2010, the Lees donated $1 million to establish an endowed chair in pediatric hematology and oncology at the Arkansas Children's Hospital, where Jaxon was treated. During Lee's first stint with Philadelphia, Kristen became close with Phillies owner John Middleton and his wife at the team's Manhattan hotel after the Game 6 loss in the 2009 World Series. Kristen lobbied Lee's agent for a return to Philadelphia for the 2011 season.

Lee filed for divorce on February 9, 2026 in Pulaski County.

Off the field, Lee is known for having an introverted personality; an article in the Arkansas Democrat-Gazette wrote that he "would rather cut off his pitching arm than call attention to himself". Although he had little trouble with the attention that pitching brought, Lee was uncomfortable speaking in front of large groups of people. After leaving MLB, he has made few public appearances, notably missing a 2009 Phillies team reunion during Bobby Abreu's Wall of Fame induction ceremony. His activities outside of baseball include hunting, fishing, and online chess.

== Career highlights ==
=== Awards ===
Award	Season(s)	Ref.
MLB
AL All-Star	2008, 2010	
NL All-Star	2011, 2013	
AL Cy Young Award	2008	
AL Comeback Player of the Year Award	2008	
AL Pitcher of the Month	April 2008, June 2010	
NL Pitcher of the Month	June 2011, August 2011	
MLB Players Choice Awards AL Outstanding Pitcher	2008	
MLB Players Choice Awards AL Comeback Player	2008	
Sporting News Pitcher of the Year Award	2008	
Sporting News Comeback Player of the Year Award	2008	
Philadelphia Phillies
Pitcher of the Year	2011, 2013	
Cleveland Indians
BBWAA Man of the Year Award	2008	
Gordon Cobbledick Golden Tomahawk Award	2008	

=== League leader ===
- MLB wins (2008)
- AL ERA (2008)

== See also ==
- List of Major League Baseball annual wins leaders
- List of Major League Baseball annual ERA leaders

== Notes ==
Awards and achievements
Preceded by Fausto Carmona (September 2007); Jon Lester	American League Pitcher of the month April 2008; August 2008	Succeeded by Scott Kazmir; Jon Lester
Preceded by Dan Haren	American League All-Star Game Starting Pitcher; 2008	Succeeded by Roy Halladay
Preceded by CC Sabathia	Players Choice AL Outstanding Pitcher; 2008	Succeeded by Zack Greinke
Preceded by Carlos Peña	Players Choice AL Comeback Player of the Year; 2008	Succeeded by Aaron Hill
