= Benton High School (Arkansas) =

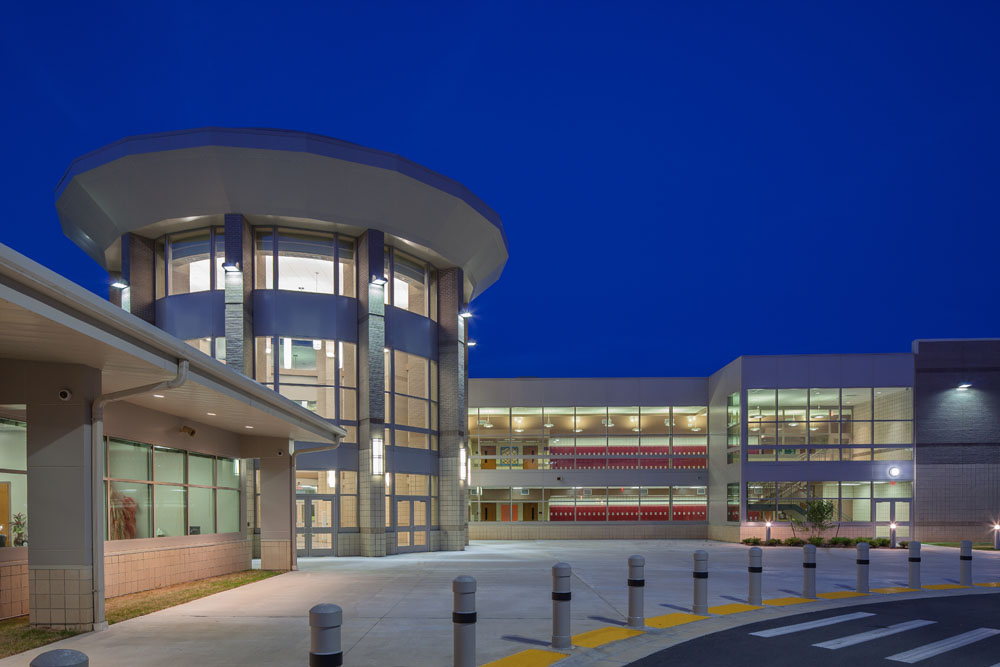

Location
- 211 N Border St; Benton, Arkansas 72015; United States; 34°33′50″N 92°34′26″W

Information
- Type: Public
- Motto: Home of the Panthers
- Established: 1885 (141 years ago)
- School district: Benton School District
- CEEB code: 040170
- NCES School ID: 050296000063
- Principal: Curt Barger
- Teaching staff: 113.95 (on FTE basis)
- Grades: 10 to 12
- Enrollment: 1,298 (2023–2024)
- Student to teacher ratio: 11.39
- Colors: Maroon and gray
- Fight song: Hail To The Victors
- Athletics conference: 7A/6A South
- Sports: Football, Baseball, Basketball, Volleyball, Soccer, Softball, Cheer, Tennis, Bowling, Track & Field, Dance, Swimming & Diving, Golf, Wrestling, Quiz Bowl
- Mascot: Panthers
- Team name: Benton Panthers
- USNWR ranking: No. 25 (AR); No. 2631 (USA)
- Website: ww2.bentonschools.org/o/bhs

Benton High School is a public high school located in Benton, Saline County, Arkansas. Benton High School is a member of the Benton School District.

== History ==
In 1885, a public referendum established the Benton School District within the county-wide system. In Saline County in 1889, there were about 4,700 students, 62 teachers, and 50 public schools. In addition, there were several private schools in the county. After 1900, smaller neighboring school districts were consolidated with the Benton District, making it possible to have a larger and better teaching force, improved equipment, and longer terms. However, it was not until the 1920s that children were required to attend school. Starting in 1928, rural children that did not have access to high school courses were allowed to transfer to Benton High and were not charged tuition. The Great Depression of the 1930s created a financial crisis in education, causing Benton school teachers to work for several years at almost half pay. In 1930, Hill’s Business College of Little Rock was established at Benton High School, where citizens of Saline County could take night classes. School enrollment grew during and after World War II.

== Academic programs ==
Benton High School has been consistently recognized for its academic excellence including selection in the U.S. News & World Report America's Best High Schools. In addition, honors received include:

- No. 1 in Geometry Test Scores for Two Consecutive Years
- 2009 AAA Academic Cheer Champions - No. 1 in Arkansas
- 2015, 2014, 2012, 2009, 2006, 2004, 2002, 2001, 1999, 1998, 1997, 1995 and 1993 State Champions Quiz Bowl

== Extracurricular activities ==
The Benton High School mascot and athletic emblem is the panther, with maroon and gray serving as the school colors.

=== Athletics ===
For the 2012–14 school years, the Benton Panthers competed in the 6A Classification within the 7A/6A South Conference as administered by the Arkansas Activities Association. The Panthers participated in football, volleyball, baseball, basketball (boys/girls), bowling (boys/girls), competitive cheer, cross country, football, golf (boys/girls), soccer (boys/girls), softball, swimming & diving (boys/girls), tennis (boys/girls), track & field (boys/girls), and wrestling.

=== Salt Bowl ===
Benton and Bryant High schools meet for the first game of the season in Little Rock's War Memorial Stadium. This game is known as the Salt Bowl. The average attendance exceeds 20,000 spectators, with 34,086 in attendance in 2015. The rivalry started when a group of students from Bryant painted a panther statue pink, so in response Benton students dropped a load of pink marshmallows from a helicopter on Bryant High's football field in 1974.

== Notable alumni ==
- Adam Faucett (2000)—musician
- Wes Gardner (1979)—MLB Player
- Cliff Lee (1997)—Major League Baseball pitcher; 2008 American League Cy Young Award winner.
- Richard Womack (1993)—Member of the Arkansas House of Representatives from District 18 in Clark, Dallas, Hot Spring, and Garland counties.
