= Benton School District (Arkansas) =

Public school district based in Benton, Arkansas, United States

Location
- 211 Border Street; Benton, Arkansas 72015 United States

District information
- Grades: PK–12 (PK is not available in certain primary schools)
- Accreditation: Arkansas Department of Education
- Schools: 7
- NCES District ID: 0502960

Students and staff
- Students: 4,750
- Teachers: 288.36 (on FTE basis)
- Staff: 503.36 (on FTE basis)
- Student–teacher ratio: 16.47

Other information
- Website: ww2.bentonschools.org

Benton School District is a public school district based in Benton, Arkansas, United States. The school district encompasses 112.22 square miles (290.6 km^{2}) of land, including portions of Saline County and Garland County serving communities such as most of Benton, a small slice of Salem CDP, Lonsdale, and Hot Springs National Park.

The district provides comprehensive education for more than 4,750 pre-kindergarten through grade 12 students while employing more than 500 faculty, administrators and staff. The district and its seven schools are accredited by the Arkansas Department of Education (ADE).

== History ==
In 1979 the Rural Dale School District dissolved, with a portion going to the Benton district.

== Schools ==
Secondary schools

- Benton High School, serving more than 950 students in grades 10 through 12.
- Benton Junior High School, serving more than 700 students in grades 8 and 9.
- Benton Middle School, serving more than 1150 students in grades 5, 6 and 7.
- Mountain View Middle School, serving more than 600 students in grades 5, 6 and 7. (Opened 2025)

Elementary schools

- Angie Grant Elementary School, serving more than 550 students in prekindergarten through grade 4.
- Caldwell Elementary School, serving more than 500 students in kindergarten through grade 4.
- Perrin Elementary School, serving more than 600 students in prekindergarten through grade 4.
- Ringgold Elementary School, serving more than 550 students in prekindergarten through grade 4.
- Mountain View Elementary School, serving more than 400 students in prekindergarten through grade 4. (Opened 2023)
