= Adam Faucett =

American singer-songwriter

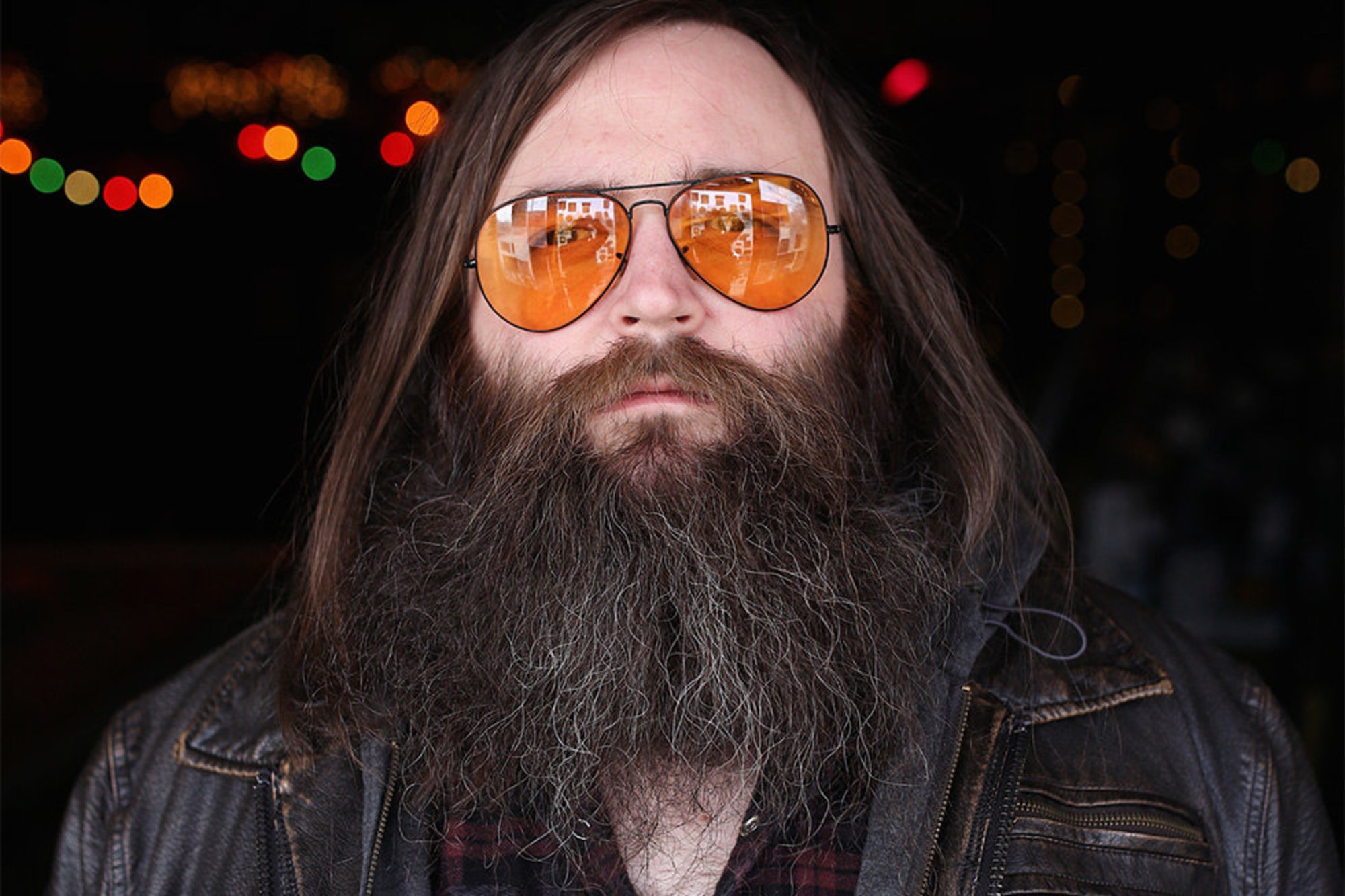

Background information
- Origin: Little Rock, Arkansas
- Genres: Folk Rock; Americana; Alternative country Experimental Rock
- Years active: 2006 - Present
- Website: http://www.adamfaucett.com

Adam Faucett is an American singer-songwriter born in Benton, Arkansas, and based out of Little Rock.

== History ==
Faucett was originally a member of Russellville, Arkansas-based band Taught the Rabbits, and has been performing solo since 2006. After Taught the Rabbits broke up, Faucett relocated to Chicago where he focused on folk music, writing his first album 'The Great Basking Shark, which was then recorded in Little Rock. He toured behind that effort, raising enough money to record a second album in 2008, 'Show Me Magic, Show Me Out,' followed by 'More Like a Temple' in 2011. During this time he toured the United States and Europe with acts such as Lucero, Calexico, The Legendary Shack Shakers, Vetiver, Chuck Ragan (of Hot Water Music) and Damien Jurado.

Faucett's music is heavily influenced by his home state of Arkansas and the American South. His music has been described as "southern soul swamp opera," but elements of experimental rock, psychedelic rock, and noise rock are reoccurring elements.

== Discography ==
Title	Label	Release date
The Great Basking Shark	Self-Released	2007
Show Me Magic, Show Me Out	Bluetint Records	2008
More Like A Temple	Space Neck Collective	2011
Blind Water Finds Blind Water	Last Chance Records	2014
It Took the Shape of a Bird	Last Chance Records	2018
