= Run support =

Run support is a baseball statistic used to assess a starting pitcher's support by the team's offense in actual runs scored. It measures how many runs were scored by his team on average when he starts. It is considered a somewhat important statistic because a team (and its pitcher) earn wins by holding its opponents to fewer runs than it scores. Since a pitcher's skill is a large factor in how many runs the opponent scores and a non-factor in how many runs his team scores, this is a measure of whether the pitcher happened to pitch on days when his team scored a lot. There are two different measures of run support. These statistics may be adjusted for park and league factors.

1. The number of runs scored per nine innings of opponent batting during the pitchers starts.
2. The number of runs per start.
