= The Clinton Chronicles =

1994 political film

The Clinton Chronicles: An Investigation into the Alleged Criminal Activities of Bill Clinton
- Directed by: Patrick Matrisciana
- Produced by: Patrick Matrisciana
- Release date: 1994
- Running time: 85 minutes

The Clinton Chronicles: An Investigation into the Alleged Criminal Activities of Bill Clinton is a 1994 film that accused Bill Clinton of a range of crimes. The claims in the video are controversial; some have been discredited, while others continue to be debated. The philandering and sexual harassment claims in the film have since been reported, and in some cases confirmed, by mainstream media. Years after the film was released, Clinton paid an out-of-court settlement to resolve the accusations made by Paula Jones in the movie.

While the film was directed by Patrick Matrisciana, who has a production company called Jeremiah Films, the production was credited to Citizens for Honest Government, a project of a Westminster, California organization named Creative Ministries Inc. that has connections to Matrisciana. It was partially funded by Larry Nichols, a long-time Clinton opponent, and distributed with help from Jerry Falwell, who also appears in the film. Over 300,000 copies of the film were put into circulation with perhaps half that being sales.

== Summary ==
The film was produced shortly after Clinton's election to the presidency in 1992 and provides background on a number of conspiracy theories and controversies associated with now former president Bill Clinton. Several of these theories date to Clinton's tenure as the governor of Arkansas. Allegations include:

- Being a drug addict
- Having affairs with or harassing numerous women
- Troopergate, using Arkansas State Police officers to facilitate sexual liaisons and intimidate accusers
- Misuse of funds with the Arkansas Development Finance Authority
- Using Bank of Credit and Commerce International to launder money
- Profiting from drug smuggling at the Mena Airport
  - Protecting Barry Seal's drug smuggling activities
  - Murdering witnesses to the Mena drug smuggling operation
  - Covering up the circumstances surrounding the deaths of two boys found dead on railroad tracks near the airport, Kevin Ives and Don Henry
  - Protecting a state medical examiner who was repeatedly accused of misstating the cause of death in several autopsies
- Whitewater controversy
- Covering up the cause of the death of Vince Foster
- Using contacts at the Rose Law Firm to shred documents that would have implicated Clinton in scandals

== Criticism ==
The video was characterized by The Washington Post as a "bizarre and unsubstantiated documentary." The New York Times reported that it was a poorly documented "hodgepodge of sometimes-crazed charges." The producers were criticized after it came to light that a number of the people in the documentary had been paid to appear. The director admitted the payments but denied he had instructed any paid participants to say anything that was false.

The movie helped perpetuate the Clinton body count conspiracy theory about a list of associates Clinton was purported to have had killed. The Los Angeles Times reported that Larry Nichols, who appears throughout the film and is the primary source for a number of the murder and mysterious death claims, was fired from his Arkansas state government job and once admitted to an Associated Press reporter to being motivated by spite. The fact checking site TruthOrFiction.com states that "There is no credible evidence that any of the deaths is related or can be attributed to Bill Clinton".

To promote the film, Falwell aired an interview with Matrisciana, who was silhouetted to conceal his identity as he pretended to be a journalist who was afraid for his life. Matrisciana later acknowledged that he was not in any danger, but that the interview was staged for dramatic effect at Falwell's suggestion.

== Later developments ==
The New York Times interviewed some of the participants in the film after it aired for followup developments. Gary Parks, who appeared in a segment of the film discussing the suspicious circumstances of the death of his father, who investigated Clinton's womanizing, admitted he embellished some details in the film, but still believes his father was killed for political reasons. Linda Ives, the mother of Kevin Ives, stated that her interest for participating was solving the mystery of her son's death, and was concerned her comments were used for political purposes. Bill Duncan, a former IRS agent who investigated the Mena accusations regretted appearing on the film, stating, "I would not have willingly been a part of it had I known where that footage would end up".

Matrisciana produced a followup video focused exclusively on the Mena airport drug smuggling and murder accusations. Two police officers accused in that film of being involved with the murders of Ives and Henry attempted to sue Matrisciana for defamation. They initially prevailed; however, lost the case when it was appealed. The appeal focused primarily on free speech and the ability to criticize public figures. Even though the judges overturned the ruling of defamation, they were critical of the film in their ruling, saying it blurred the lines between fact and fiction.

A number of the incidents mentioned in The Clinton Chronicles continued to be investigated after its release. Paula Jones, who appeared in the film accusing Clinton of harassing her, sued the president for sexual harassment. The president paid Jones $850,000 to settle the case out of court. Special prosecutor Ken Starr was assigned to investigate a number of incidents mentioned in the film. While the Starr Report accused Clinton of obstruction of justice in covering up an affair, and other players in the Whitewater controversy were charged and sentenced, Starr declined to recommend charges for Clinton over Whitewater and cleared Clinton of involvement with Vince Foster's death.

Linda Ives continued to search for justice for her son's death. The film mentioned that her son's death was controversially ruled accidental by an examiner who had a history of questionable rulings. After the film aired, she had her son's body exhumed and a second autopsy performed. She successfully had the original examiner's ruling overruled and the cause of death for Kevin Ives and Don Henry was changed from accidental to homicide. The movie connected these deaths to smuggling activities at the Mena Airport, suggesting the boys had become accidental witnesses to a drug drop. However, their bodies were found along train tracks in Alexander, Arkansas, approximately 120 miles (190 km) to the east of Mena. Official investigations have focused on drug smuggling activities in Saline County, Arkansas. In February 2018, Billy Jack Haynes, a professional wrestler with a history of making controversial claims on camera, claimed to have been hired as a body guard for drug smugglers and a witness to these murders. He advocated for the case to be re-opened; however, the case remains unsolved.

== See also ==
People who appeared or who were discussed in the film

- James D. Johnson
- David Hale
- Wilson v. Arkansas - A litigant in this case was interviewed for the film.

Other efforts to accuse Clinton of misdeeds

- Arkansas Project
- Clinton crazies
- Vast Right-Wing Conspiracy
