= Killing of Don Henry and Kevin Ives =

Murder committed in 1987

Don Henry
- Born: Donald George Henry; September 30, 1970
- Died: August 23, 1987 (aged 16); Alexander, Arkansas, US

Kevin Ives
- Born: Larry Kevin Ives; April 28, 1970
- Died: August 23, 1987 (aged 17); Alexander, Arkansas, US

Around 4:30 a.m. on August 23, 1987, 16-year-old Don Henry and 17-year-old Kevin Ives were hit by a Union Pacific freight train in the town of Alexander, Arkansas, United States, as they were lying on the tracks. The locomotive engineer engaged the brakes while blowing the horn, but the train could not stop in time and rolled over the boys. Members of the locomotive crew stated that the bodies were partly covered by a tarpaulin and were motionless. The deaths were initially ruled an accident, but further investigation and conflicting evidence led a grand jury to rule the deaths "probable homicides". Popular speculation on the facts of the case has produced media coverage and allegations of wrongdoing by several government agencies.

== Investigation ==
The state medical examiner, Fahmy Malak, ruled the deaths an accident, saying the boys fell asleep on the tracks as a result of marijuana intoxication. The parents did not accept this finding and conducted their own investigation. In March 1988, James Garriot of San Antonio offered a second opinion and was skeptical of the findings about marijuana. A second autopsy by Georgia medical examiner Joseph Burton found the equivalent of one or two marijuana cigarettes. A grand jury ruled the deaths a "probable homicide".

Despite pressure from the victims' parents, Saline County Sheriff James H. Steed Jr. refused to investigate the case. In February 1988, Dan Harmon, the parents' attorney and Saline County Prosecutor, finally reached an agreement with Steed that he would begin an investigation if the parents stopped criticizing him. However, the subsequent investigation was apparently sabotaged and several witnesses who were to testify before a grand jury were found dead. Sheriff Steed is also said to have lied about where he sent the dead boys' clothes for examination. He sent them to the Arkansas State Crime Lab and not, as intended, to the Federal Bureau of Investigation (FBI). Harmon also soon lost the trust of the parents, as he is also said to have prevented the case from being solved.

The mother of Kevin Ives, Linda Ives, who worked to solve and investigate the case privately until the end of her life, died in Arkansas in June 2021.

== Suspects and theories ==
Many theories of the causes of the boys' deaths have been shared in popular media. The claim shared by many of these sources is that the boys were murdered after witnessing a drug drop from an airplane. This claim draws a link to the operations of Barry Seal and the Mena Airport in nearby Polk County but no direct link has been documented. The case was profiled on the television program Unsolved Mysteries in 1988. The 1994 conspiracy-theory movie The Clinton Chronicles blamed the cover-up of the murders on Bill Clinton, who was governor of Arkansas at the time and is alleged to have known about the drug trafficking in his state. In 1996, film producer Patrick Matrisciana released a video entitled Obstruction of Justice: The Mena Connection, in which witnesses make allegations against various authorities. Two accused police officers denied any involvement in the case and sued Matrisciana and his film company for defamation, whereupon a judge awarded them $600,000. However, Matrisciana successfully appealed the verdict, and the judgement was overturned in 2001. In 1999, investigative journalist Mara Leveritt published the book The Boys on the Tracks: Death, Denial, and a Mother's Crusade to Bring Her Son's Killers to Justice, which deals with the case and the alleged involvement of the authorities in the murders.

== Dead witnesses ==
At least five witnesses died or disappeared between 1988 and 1990:

- Keith McKaskle, an informant for Dan Harmon who had taken aerial photographs of the crime scene, was murdered in 1988, two days after Sheriff Steed lost his re-election
- Keith Coney, who was scheduled to testify before the grand jury in the case, died in a motorcycle accident in early January 1989. Some witnesses claim another vehicle seemed to intentionally run him off the road.
- Greg Collins, who was also called to testify before the grand jury and was an acquaintance of Keith Coney, was killed by three shots from a shotgun on January 26, 1989
- Daniel “Boonie” Bearden, another witness, disappeared without a trace in March 1989
- Jeffrey Edward Rhodes, whose body was found in a landfill in April 1989, was also linked to the case

== See also ==
- List of unsolved murders (1980–1999)
