= Bryant Public Schools =

Public school district, Arkansas, United States

Location
- 200 Northwest 4th Street; Bryant, Arkansas 72022 United States

District information
- Type: Public school district
- Superintendent: Dr. Karen Walters
- School board: Bryant School Board
- Schools: 12
- NCES District ID: 0503690

Students and staff
- Enrollment: 8,027 (2010–11)
- Faculty: 480.68 (on FTE basis)
- Staff: 879.68 (on FTE basis), 810 (total employees)
- Student–teacher ratio: 16.70

Other information
- Area: 349 sq mi (900 km^{2})
- School Millage Rate: 33.5 mills
- Free/Reduced Lunch Rate: 27.1%
- Per Pupil Expenses: US$5,621
- Website: www.bryantschools.org

Bryant Public Schools (or Bryant Public School District) is a public school district based in Bryant, Arkansas, United States. Since the 2010–11 school year, the school district provides early childhood, elementary and secondary education to more than 8,000 students in prekindergarten through grade 12 and employs more than 875 educators and staff at its schools and district offices. BPS encompasses 342.19 square miles (886.3 km^{2}) of land in Saline County.

It supports all portions of Bryant, Alexander, Avilla, Bauxite, Benton, Salem CDP, Shannon Hills, and Paron.

== History ==
In the early 1970s, political aide Carol Rasco set up the public school system's psychological counseling services while she worked in the district.

On July 1, 2004 the Paron School District merged into the Bryant School District. Because the state government considered Paron an isolated rural area, it gave an additional $838,000 to the Bryant district. Due to low student populations and the resulting complications, the district closed Paron High School in 2006, and Paron Elementary School in 2015.

In 2011, Bryant School District and its high school were recognized in the AP District of the Year Awards program in the College Board's 2nd Annual Honor Roll that consisted of 367 U.S. public school districts (4 in Arkansas) that simultaneously achieved increases in access to AP® courses for a broader number of students and improved the rate at which their AP students earned scores of 3 or higher on an AP Exam.

== Schools ==
High schools:

- Bryant High School, grades 10-12 located in Bryant
- Bryant Jr. High, grade 9 & 8

Middle schools:

- Bryant Middle School, grades 6&7 located in Bryant
- Bethel Middle School, grades 6&7 located in Alexander

In 2017, Bryant Public Schools announced a junior high school, which opened in 2019 to accommodate 8th & 9th graders.

Elementary schools:

- Bryant Elementary, prekindergarten through grade 5 located in Bryant
- Collegeville Elementary, kindergarten through grade 5 located in Bryant
- Robert L. Davis Elementary, kindergarten through grade 5 located in Alexander
- Hurricane Creek Elementary, kindergarten through grade 5 located in Benton
- Salem Elementary, kindergarten through grade 5 located in Bryant
- Springhill Elementary, kindergarten through grade 5 located in Alexander
- Hillfarm Elementary, kindergarten through grade 5 located in Bryant
- Parkway Elementary, kindergarten through grade 5 located in Bryant

=== Former schools ===
- Paron High School in Paron (Unincorporated area) - Acquired in 2004, closed in 2006
- Paron Elementary School in Paron (Unincorporated area) - Acquired in 2004. In 2015, the Bryant district voted to close Paron Elementary School. At the time it had about 75 students. Paron students were reassigned to Salem Elementary School.

== Notable alumni ==
- Travis Wood - Former Professional baseball player for the Chicago Cubs
- Shane Broadway - Former Arkansas State Senator
