= Larry Nichols =

American political commentator (1950–2020)

Larry Raymond Nichols (July 29, 1950 – September 27, 2020) was an American political commentator known for his accusations against Bill Clinton. He was one of the creators of the 1994 film The Clinton Chronicles.

== Early life ==
Nichols grew up in Conway, Arkansas, where he was a star high school football player. He then made a living writing advertising jingles and also played as a guitarist in local rock bands.

== Career ==
=== Arkansas Development Finance Authority ===
Nichols was hired by Governor of Arkansas Bill Clinton in 1988 as marketing director for the Arkansas Development Finance Authority. In 1988, the Associated Press reported he placed 642 long-distance calls at state expense on behalf of the Contras in Nicaragua, either to Nicaragua or to U.S. politicians backing them. At first, Nichols claimed the calls were related to the finance authority. However, when that story did not hold up, Clinton fired him.

=== Lawsuit against Clinton ===
Nichols filed a lawsuit against Clinton for improper dismissal. As part of this, during Clinton's 1990 gubernatorial reelection campaign, Nichols claimed the governor was using state funds to conduct affairs with five different women.

His charges did not get much attention at the time, but when Clinton and his wife, Hillary Clinton, achieved national prominence with the Bill Clinton presidential campaign, 1992, Nichols came to the forefront of those proclaiming knowledge of local Clinton misdeeds. A January 23, 1992, article in Star Magazine about him named five women, including beauty contest winners Elizabeth Gracen and Lencola Sullivan, and Arkansas state employee Gennifer Flowers. Flowers alleged a prolonged affair with Bill Clinton and played tapes of telephone conversations she had with him, leading to an early crisis in the Clinton campaign, and an appearance on January 26 on 60 Minutes with Steve Kroft.

The night before, January 25, 1992, Nichols announced he was dropping his lawsuit against Clinton. He said, "It is time to call the fight I have with Bill Clinton over. ... I set out to destroy him for what I believed happened to me."

=== Media figure ===
Throughout Clinton's presidency, Nichols was a frequent guest on conservative talk radio and promulgated various conspiracy theories about Clinton. These included tales about alleged goings on at Mena Airport in western Arkansas. The New York Times characterized Nichols as one of the "Clinton crazies". In a 1997 interview, Nichols said, "They may just kill me. You'll read one day that I got drunk and ran into a moving bridge. Or Larry Nichols got depressed over everything and blew his head off."

In 2013 Nichols claimed a career as a hit-man, stating on The Pete Santilli Show that he had murdered people, on command, for the Clintons. But he said in 2015 that he had been taking painkillers when he made the 2013 remark and he did not mean it.

Nichols again received media attention in context of the Hillary Clinton 2016 presidential campaign. In early 2015, Nichols said that despite not liking Hillary Clinton, he might support her candidacy because he believed she was tough enough to combat Islamic terrorism.
