= Municipal Property Owners' Improvement Districts of Shannon Hills Arkansas =

Improvement District No. 10
- Special-purpose district
- Country: United States
- State: Arkansas
- County: Saline
- City: Shannon Hills

Government
  - Type: Municipal Property Owners' Improvement District
  - Commissioner: Robert C. McClure
  - Commissioner: Jill Lasely
  - District Assessor: Alan King

Improvement Districts No. 53 and 54
- Special-purpose district
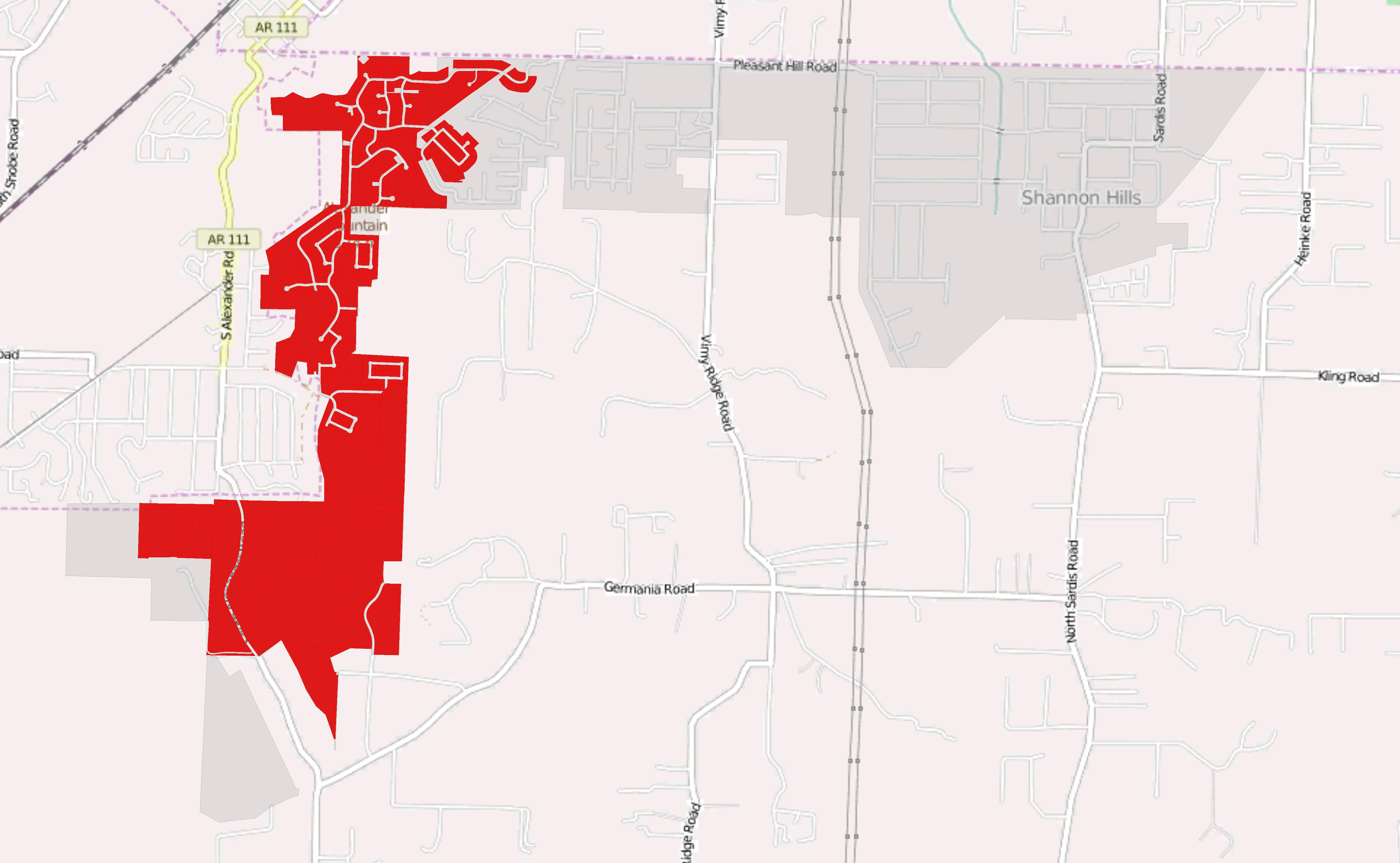
- Approximate boundaries of Improvement Districts 53 and 54
- Country: United States
- State: Arkansas
- County: Saline
- City: Shannon Hills
- Established: May 19, 2005

Government
  - Type: Municipal Property Owners' Improvement District
  - Commissioner: Doug Loftin
  - Commissioner: Cindy Loftin
  - Commissioner: Wesley Loftin
  - District Assessor: Alan King

Municipal Property Owners' Improvement Districts No. 10, 53, and 54 are independent municipal governments formed under Arkansas Code §14.94-101 and located within the City of Shannon Hills, Arkansas. Arkansas Code gives the Board of Commissioners of the Improvement Districts broad powers, including powers to use eminent domain, to issue bonds, to assess and levy taxes, to sell or lease any improvements, to hire employees, and to sue. Unlike other local municipal governments, until reporting year 2012, Arkansas Code did not require the Municipal Property Owners' Improvement Districts to record or publicly disclose any financial information including total property tax income, spending, expenses, or debt.

== Emerald Mountain Improvement Districts No. 53 and 54 ==
During a Special City Council Meeting on May 19, 2005, the Shannon Hills City Council passed two ordinances to approve petitions presented by the owners of Hometex, LLC (Doug Loftin, Thomas Cunningham, and Travis Bull) to form Improvement Districts No. 53 and 54 on Emerald Mountain. Improvement District No. 53 and 54 have the same geographic area, but are operated as independent municipal governments with some overlap and some differences in responsibilities. Both Improvement Districts were given the power to build sanitary waterworks, sewer collection system, green areas, landscaping, lighting, playgrounds, swimming pools, tennis courts, and roads. District No. 53 was proposed to be established for recreational property and improvements and the Improvement District No. 54 for the construction of utilities and access to other residential subdivision infrastructure. The original ordinances were not published in the legal time frame and the City Council re-approved the ordinances during the September 13, 2005 Regular City Council Meeting.

=== Board of Commissioners ===
Doug Loftin, Thomas Cunningham, and Travis Bull were the original members of the Board of both Improvement Districts. On September 30, 2009, both Travis Bull and Thomas Cunningham resigned as commissioner of Improvement Districts No. 53 and 54. In their place Doug Loftin's son, Wesley Loftin, and Doug Loftin's wife, Cindy Loftin, were appointed as a Commissioners of Improvement Districts No. 53 and 54. With the exception of Wesley Loftin, all other current and former members of the Board of Commissioners of Improvement Districts No. 53 and 54 were owners of Hometex, LLC.

=== Improvement District No. 53 ===
Property Owned by Improvement District No. 53

On October 1, 2005, Bank of the Ozarks was the Bond Trustee in issuing $3,770,000 worth of bonds to Improvement District No. 53 with a construction fund of $3,110,000 to purchase 200 acres to be dedicated as a public park and for facilities including hiking trails, horseback riding stables and trails, swimming pools, tennis courts, and other amenities. Per the provisions of the bond, any property tax collections are required to be used to service the bond debt and any administrative costs.

==== Construction Fund Spending ====
On October 14, 2005, the Commissioners of Improvement District No. 53 used their powers as Commissioners to purchase over 200 acres of land for $2,740,000 from Hometex, LLC, a company owned by the members of the Board of Commissioners of the Improvement District. In effect, this was a transfer of property that Hometex, LLC could not build homes on, and which a majority of the land has not been and cannot be used for recreational use.

Between 2008 and 2009, approximately $285,000 of the construction fund was spent on improvements to less than 25 acres of the over 200 acres originally purchased. The improvements included Candice Cove Park, concrete walking trails, a park pavilion, a pool, a bathhouse, a parking area, and landscaping. Of the original $2,740,000 of construction funds $85,000 has not been accounted for.

==== Reassessed Tax Rates ====
Improvement District No. 53 held a public meeting on November 5, 2013 to reassess property values. At the time, the Improvement District had 596 lots of the 1,500 originally planned. The public notice, posted in the Arkansas Democrat Gazette, cited the reason for the reassessment as the pressure sewer line within the district only had the capacity to handle a maximum of 800 to 1,000 lots. However, the public notice did not cite the reassessment provisions of Arkansas Code, but rather the provision of Arkansas Code for subsequent tax levies if the tax first levied shall prove insufficient to pay the bonds. In 2013, the same period of the reassessment of taxes for Improvement District 53, Hometex, LLC became delinquent on its property taxes owed to both Improvement District No. 53 and 54 and, as a result, the bond fund balance for Improvement District 53 had fallen to below $3,000. The reassessment assumed only 800 more lots could be built and significantly reduced the assessed benefits to the undeveloped land owned by Hometex, LLC, reducing their future tax burden as a result. On June 23, 2015, Doug Loftin, Cindy Loftin, and Hometex, LLC filed for Chapter 7 bankruptcy. The filing included $267,566 in delinquent property taxes in addition to an undisclosed amount of debt owed to both Improvement Districts No. 53 and 54. In 2015, Bank of the Ozarks acquired most of the undeveloped land previously owned by Hometex, LLC and paid $250,000 of back taxes owed to Improvement District 53. As a result of the reassessment, homeowners in the district saw their tax bills raise from $228 to $429 a year and the taxes owed on undeveloped land now owned by Bank of The Ozarks decreased from approximately $200,000 a year to $94,000 a year.

==== Current Finances ====
As of the end of 2015, Improvement District No. 53 does not report any construction funds remaining and has $3,235,000 in bond debt remaining with a final pay-off date of February 1, 2036. Improvement District No. 53 pays for water, electric, and lawn services, but does not report these expenses on its transparency report.

Operational and Maintenance Reported Cost of Facilities
Fiscal Year	Improvement District	
Fiscal Year	No. 53	No. 10
2008	$71,127	
2009	$75,627	
2012	$30,069	$3,769
2013	--	$4,705
2014	--	$5,214
2015	--	$8,369

=== Improvement District No. 54 ===
Between 2005 and 2006 Bank of the Ozarks was the Bond Trustee in issuing $3,075,000 worth of bonds to Improvement District No. 54 with a total construction fund of $2,723,000 to use for subdivision infrastructure construction cost for an 204 lots including costs of streets, water and sewer, curb and gutter, lighting and other amenities. Per the provisions of the bond any property tax collections are required to be used to service the bond debt and administrative cost.

As of the end of 2012, Improvement District No. 54 had paid Hometex, LLC $2,473,669 and only received $1,172,715 worth of improvements. Doug Loftin has ignored multiple requests from the public to disclose what improvements the construction funds for Improvement Districts No. 53 and 54 were spent on.

==== Current Finances ====
As of the end of 2015, Improvement District 54 does not report any construction funds remaining and has $1,655,000 in bond debt with a final payoff date of February 1, 2037.

== Carrington Place Improvement District No. 10 ==
Doug Loftin, John D. Torney Sr., and Robert O. Smith filed a petition with the City Council of Shannon Hills to form the Carrington Place Municipal Recreational Improvement District. The petition was approved on September 28, 1998 by Mayor Harold MacIntire using an emergency order as there was an "immediate need for the formation of the District to promote and protect the health, safety and welfare of the citizens of Shannon Hills".

=== Board of Commissioners ===
Doug Loftin, John D. Torney Sr., and Robert O. Smith were the original members of the Board of the Improvement District. Around 2000, Doug Loftin resigned as commissioner of Improvement District No. 10. By 2012, the Commissioners of Improvement District No. 10 included Bob McClure and Jill Lasely.

=== Maintenance Agreement ===
In 2007, Improvement District No. 10 and Improvement District No. 53 entered in an agreement which allows property owners in both districts to utilize both improvement district facilities and improvements. In exchange, Improvement District No. 10 collects property taxes and pays directly for the maintenance of facilities located within Improvement District No. 10 and sends additional funds to Improvement District No. 53 for management of activities and development of Improvement District No. 53 facilities. As of the end of 2015, Improvement District No. 10 has no debt, property, or facilities. It encompasses 7 vacant lots, with 233 homes completed on the remaining lots.

Improvement District No. 10 Transfers to Improvement District No. 53
Fiscal Year	Amount
2007	$45,000
2008	$35,000
2009	$65,000
2010	$55,000
2011	$50,000
2012	$55,000
2013	$60,000
2014	$60,000
2015	$44,000
