= Clinton body count conspiracy theory =

Conspiracy theory about first family of the United States

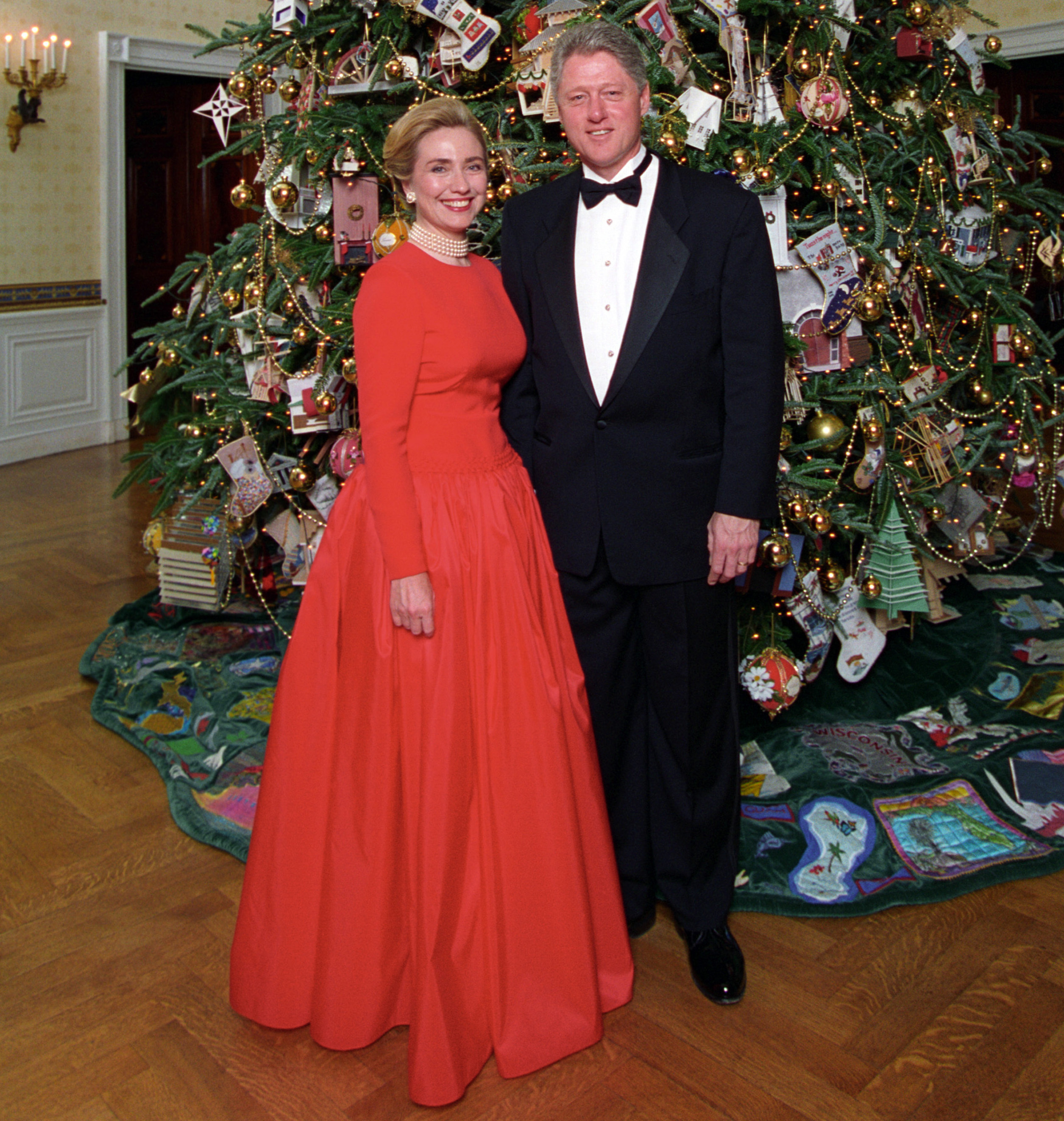
Bill and Hillary Clinton in 1997

The Clinton body count is a conspiracy theory centered around the belief that former U.S. President Bill Clinton and his wife, former U.S. Secretary of State Hillary Clinton, have secretly had their political opponents murdered, often made to look like suicides, totaling as many as 50 or more listed victims. The Congressional Record (1994) stated that the compiler of the original list, Linda Thompson, admitted she had "no direct evidence" of Clinton killing anyone. Indeed, she claimed the deaths were probably caused by "people trying to control the president" but refused to say who they were.

Such allegations have been circulated since at least 1994, when a film called The Clinton Chronicles, produced by Larry Nichols and promoted by Rev. Jerry Falwell, accused Bill Clinton of multiple crimes, including murder. Additional promulgators of the conspiracy include Christopher Ruddy, Donald Trump, and Marjorie Taylor Greene.

Several sources have discredited the conspiracy theory, such as the Congressional Record, the Lakeland Ledger, the Chicago Tribune, Snopes and others, pointing to detailed death records, the unusually large circle of associates that a president is likely to have, and the fact that many of the people listed had been misidentified or were still alive. Others had no known link to the Clintons.

== History ==
In 1994, Citizens for Honest Government, a California-based conservative group, released the documentary The Clinton Chronicles, which featured conservative commentator[Larry Nichols —a former Arkansas state employee under Clinton's governorship who was fired for making calls to the Contras from his office—and the Rev. Jerry Falwell. The documentary promoted the claim that the Clintons were involved in the deaths of numerous people they had often only loose connections with, including Vince Foster. Falwell heavily promoted the documentary in a series of TV infomercials.

In August 1994, Congressman Andrew Jacobs Jr. condemned the conspiracy theory in the Congressional Record, in the wake of The Clinton Chronicles leading to the conspiracy theory spreading among conservative activists and commentators. Jacobs cited an article in U.S. News & World Report by Greg Ferguson and David Bowermaster titled "Whatever It Is, Bill Clinton Likely Did It", which he inserted into the Record. The article determined that the original list, titled "Clinton Body Count: Coincidence or the Kiss of Death?" and consisting of 24 people, was compiled by lawyer and activist Linda Thompson and submitted to former congressman William Dannemeyer, who sent the list to congressional leadership and urged hearings. Ferguson and Bowermaster concluded "Thompson admits she has 'no direct evidence' of Clinton killing anyone. Indeed, she says the deaths were probably caused by 'people trying to control the president' but refuses to say who they were."

== Alleged victims ==
=== Don Henry and Kevin Ives ===
Don Henry and Kevin Ives, two Arkansas teenagers, were killed and their bodies placed on railroad tracks on August 23, 1987. At the time, the boys' deaths were controversially ruled accidental, but after Kevin Ives' body was exhumed and a second autopsy performed, the original examiner's ruling was overruled and the cause of death for Kevin Ives and Don Henry was changed from accidental to homicide. Conspiracy theorists, as well as Linda Ives, the mother of Kevin Ives, posit that the boys came upon a drug drop from an airplane, similar to Barry Seal's operations, near Mena and were then murdered. It was alleged in The Clinton Chronicles that during Bill Clinton's tenure as the governor of Arkansas he profited from drug smuggling at the Mena Airport and covered up the circumstances surrounding the deaths of the boys.

=== C. Victor Raiser II ===
C. Victor Raiser II was National Finance Co-chairman for Bill Clinton. He died in a plane crash along with his son and four others on July 30, 1992, when the de Havilland Canada DHC-2 Beaver they had chartered for a fishing trip crashed near Dillingham, Alaska. Conspiracy theorists believe the crash to have been deliberately caused, however the National Transportation Safety Board ruled it as an accident, stating:

[The probable cause of the accident was] the pilot's delayed decision in reversing course and his failure to maintain airspeed during the maneuver. Factors related to the accident were: mountainous terrain and a low ceiling.

=== Ian Spiro ===
Ian Stuart Spiro was a commodities broker who shot his family dead in their home and then was found in his car, having committed suicide by cyanide poisoning. The case was officially declared a murder-suicide case at the hands of Spiro due to financial troubles. When he was revealed to be an American and British intelligence liaison, numerous conspiracy theories came about surrounding the families’ deaths, including involving the Clintons.

=== Mary Mahoney ===
Mary Mahoney was a former White House intern who, in the early summer of 1997, was gunned down during an attempted robbery inside the Starbucks in the Georgetown neighborhood of Washington, D.C. where Mahoney was working behind the counter. The robber entered the store and shot Mahoney after she attempted to take his gun. He then shot two Starbucks employees and fled. However, conspiracy theorists believe Mahoney was killed on the orders of the Clintons.

=== Vince Foster ===
Deputy White House counsel Vince Foster was found dead in Fort Marcy Park in Virginia, outside Washington, D.C., on July 20, 1993. An autopsy determined that he was shot in the mouth, and no other wounds were found on his body. His death was ruled a suicide by five official investigations, but he remains a subject of conspiracy theories that he was actually murdered by the Clintons for knowing too much.

=== Jerry Parks ===
Jerry Parks, head of security for the Clinton headquarters during his presidential campaign in 1992, was killed on September 26, 1993, as he left a Mexican restaurant at the edge of Little Rock, Arkansas, by a man in another car that shot him ten times using a 9mm handgun. Parks’ son, Gary, asserted that his father collected a secret file of Clinton's "peccadilloes", and that his father was using the file to try to blackmail the Clinton campaign.

=== Edward Eugene Willey ===
Edward Eugene Willey Jr. was a Clinton fundraiser whose wife, Kathleen Willey, alleged on the CBS news magazine 60 Minutes that Bill Clinton had sexually assaulted her on November 29, 1993. Kathleen also testified on the Paula Jones sexual harassment suit against Clinton. Edward was found dead in the Virginia woods, and his death was ruled a suicide.

=== Ron Brown ===
Ron Brown, who served as the Secretary of Commerce during the first term of President Bill Clinton. Prior to this he was chairman of the Democratic National Committee. Brown had been under investigation by an independent counsel for the Commerce Department trade mission controversy and was a material witness, who had been noticed to testify, in Judicial Watch's lawsuit against the Clinton Commerce Department. He and 34 others died in the 1996 Croatia USAF CT-43 crash.

=== Jim McDougal ===
Jim McDougal, a financial partner of the Clintons in the real estate venture that led to the Whitewater scandal, died of a heart attack at the Federal Correctional Facility in Fort Worth, Texas, on March 8, 1998.

=== John F. Kennedy Jr. ===
John F. Kennedy Jr., who was, according to polls, the most popular Democrat in New York, was reportedly considering a run for the seat of retiring Sen. Daniel Moynihan in the 2000 United States Senate election in New York but died in a plane crash on July 16, 1999. Hillary Clinton was elected to Moynihan's vacated seat on November 7, 2000.

=== Seth Rich ===
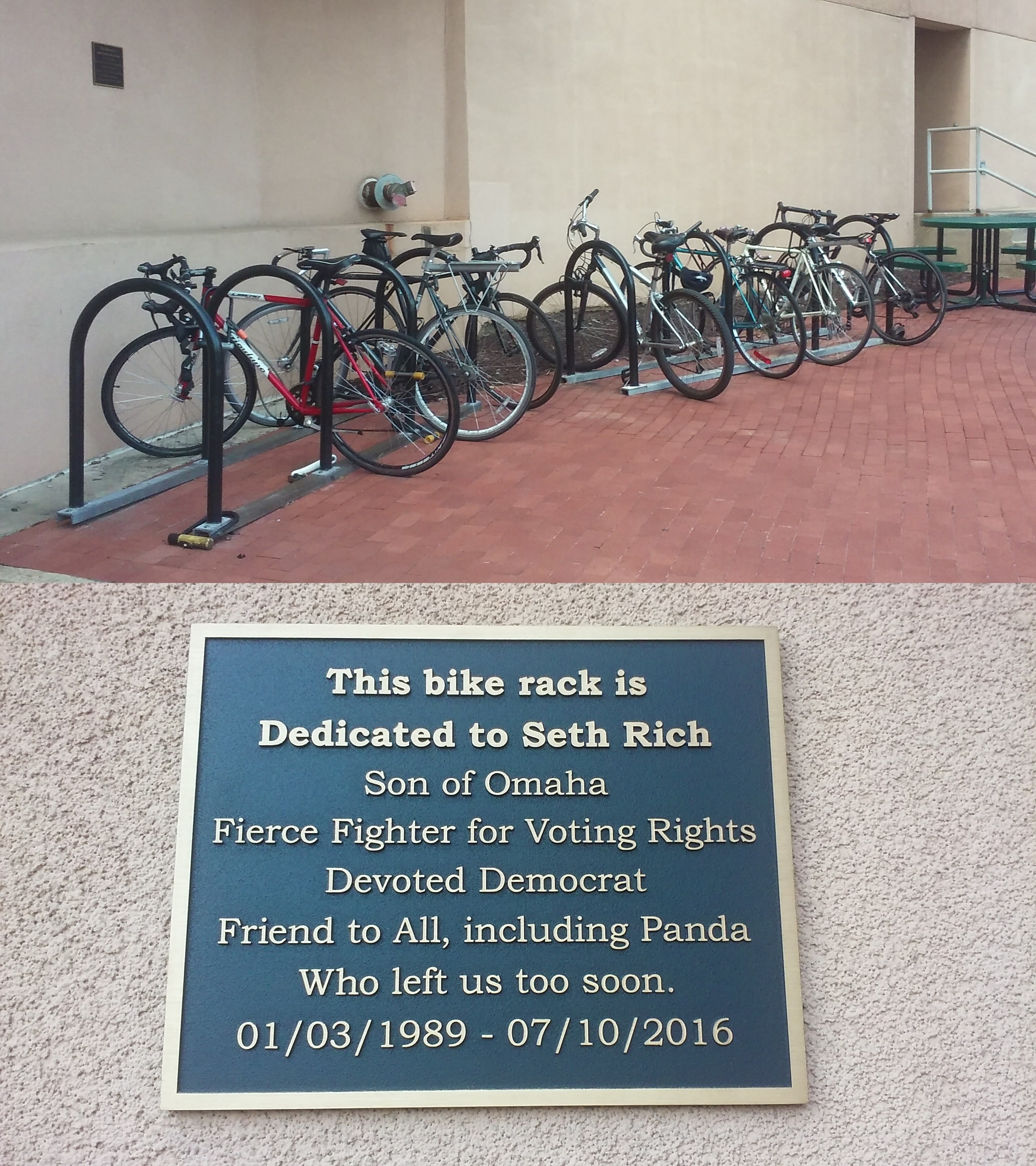
Bike rack dedicated to Seth Rich, the subject of a conspiracy theory that claimed he was murdered by the Clintons

The unsolved 2016 murder of Democratic National Committee staff member Seth Rich prompted conspiracy theorists to speculate that Hillary Clinton arranged his death; the theory was based on a debunked Fox News report, later retracted, that Rich had been responsible for Wikileaks' release of DNC emails during the 2016 United States presidential campaign. Various elements of this theory have been promoted by Julian Assange and prominent right-wing figures like Alex Jones, Newt Gingrich, and Sean Hannity.

=== Victor Thorn ===
Victor Thorn, an anti-government conspiracy theorist and author of three books accusing the Clintons of involvement in murder and drug trafficking, died in 2016 from a self-inflicted gunshot. Proponents of the conspiracy theory, including political consultant Roger Stone, claimed that Thorn had been murdered for his attacks on the Clintons. Both Thorn's family and American Free Press, a right-wing newspaper that Thorn worked for, reported that Thorn had killed himself.

=== Shawn Lucas ===
Shawn Lucas, a process server in Washington, D.C., served the Democratic National Committee with a lawsuit from Bernie Sanders alleging that the DNC had committed electoral fraud to ensure that Hillary Clinton defeated Sanders in the 2016 Democratic Party presidential primaries. On August 2, 2016, Lucas was found dead at his home, which investigators stated was caused by the "combined adverse effects of fentanyl, cyclobenzaprine, and mitragynine". Lucas's minor role in the lawsuit against the DNC, combined with the fact that his cause of death was not released to the public for several months, led to proponents of the theory suggesting that he had in fact been murdered. According to Snopes, many internet users who supported the murder theory falsely claimed that Lucas was the "lead attorney" in the DNC lawsuit. Some also tried to connect Lucas's death to that of Seth Rich (see above).

=== Jeffrey Epstein ===
Convicted sex offender Jeffrey Epstein, being held on federal charges of child sex trafficking, was found dead in his cell at the high-security Metropolitan Correctional Center in Manhattan on August 10, 2019. An official autopsy later declared the cause of death as a suicide by hanging. His death led to conspiracy theories being relayed on social media, particularly relating to Bill Clinton and President Donald Trump. Hours after Epstein's death, Trump retweeted claims that Epstein's death was related to Clinton, including the hashtag #ClintonBodyCount. Lynne Patton, a Trump appointee at HUD, said "Hillary'd!!" and used the hashtag #VinceFosterPartTwo in an Instagram post about Epstein's death. Conspiracy theorist Dinesh D'Souza attempted to use the time he spent in a federal correctional center to lend authority to the conspiracy theory that the Clintons were responsible for Epstein's death.

In May 2025, a White House press briefing included Zero Hedge's Liam Cosgrove, where he connected Epstein and the body count conspiracy theory.

=== Christopher Sign ===
Reporter Christopher Sign broke the news of a meeting on June 27, 2016, on the Phoenix Sky Harbor tarmac between former President Bill Clinton and then-Attorney General Loretta Lynch. The timing of the meeting happened during the 2016 presidential election when then-candidate Hillary Clinton was under scrutiny for how she handled certain emails during her tenure as U.S. Secretary of State. Sign was found dead in his Alabama home on June 12, 2021, and his death was investigated as a suicide. Several right-wing figures, including Lauren Boebert, Dan Bongino and Charlie Kirk, as well as the pro-Trump cable channel One America News Network, suggested that Sign had been murdered by the Clintons.

=== Kobe Bryant ===
Los Angeles Lakers basketballer Kobe Bryant was killed in a helicopter crash alongside eight others on January 26, 2020. Members of the QAnon movement claimed that the crash had been engineered to kill Bryant in order to prevent him from exposing financial misconduct by the Clintons. This claim was based on a Facebook post in which Bryant allegedly threatened the release of "information that will lead to the arrest of Hillary Clinton". PolitiFact reported that no such post existed and that the claim was a hoax.

According to the National Transportation Safety Board, the crash that killed Bryant was caused when the helicopter's pilot flew into low cloud and lost control.

=== Jovenel Moïse ===
Haitian president Jovenel Moïse was assassinated on July 7, 2021, when gunmen attacked his residence in Pèlerin 5, a district of Pétion-Ville. Martine Moïse, the first lady of Haiti, was hospitalized for wounds sustained during the attack. Some right-wing conspiracy theorists have claimed that the Clintons were involved in Moïse's death, pointing to political controversies regarding aid given to Haiti by the Clinton Foundation, such as "hurricane-proof" classroom trailers that were found to be structurally unsafe and laced with formaldehyde. Followers of the QAnon conspiracy theory, who claim that Donald Trump is secretly waging war against a cabal of child traffickers that includes the Clintons, heavily discussed the idea that they had a hand in the assassination. Discussion of the unfounded claim caused the term "Clintons" to become a top trend on Twitter.

=== Mark Middleton ===
Mark Middleton was a businessman who was a close friend and special adviser to President Bill Clinton, serving as a senior aide during Clinton's administration. On May 7, 2022, in Perry County, Arkansas, Middleton was discovered hanging from a tree with an extension cord around his neck and a shotgun wound to his chest. A shotgun was found near his body. The circumstances of his death prompted public speculation.

== Faked screenshots ==
Fabricated screenshots of tweets stating "I have information that will lead to the arrest of Hillary Clinton." that were supposedly sent by figures such as celebrity chef Anthony Bourdain, basketball player Kobe Bryant, Supreme Court Justice Ruth Bader Ginsburg, former Japanese prime minister Shinzo Abe and Queen Elizabeth II prior to their deaths have appeared on social media.
