= Paron High School =

School in Arkansas, United States

Location
- 22265 Hwy. 9 Paron, Arkansas 72122; United States
- Coordinates: 34°46′21″N 92°45′32″W

Information
- School district: Paron School District (-2004); Bryant School District (2004-2006)
- Communities served: Paron
- Website: web.archive.org/*/http://bryantschools.org:80/paron/index.html

Paron High School was a high school in Paron, an unincorporated area in Saline County, Arkansas. At the time of its closure it was a part of the Bryant School District and it served grades 6-12; the school closed in 2006 and consolidated into Bryant High School.

== History ==
The school was initially in the Paron School District. On July 1, 2004, the Paron School District merged into the Bryant School District. This merger occurred due to a state law which required a school district with fewer than 350 students to merge with another school district.

In the 2005-2006 school year, Paron High had 111 students. The school did not have enough money to keep its budget balanced, and the school did not have enough teachers to offer all of the State of Arkansas's required courses; according to Arkansas law each high school must offer 38 courses. In addition the Bryant school district, which was under a deficit, raised the salaries of all Paron teachers to the level of the district's other teachers, resulting in an extra $10,000 per teacher. The school district determined that, according to its state of finances, it was unable to keep Paron High open, despite receiving extra money from the state government for operating an isolated rural school. While the Arkansas school district closure law initially had a provision that barred the closure of isolated rural schools, in 2005 the provision was deleted, allowing for the closure of Paron High.

The Bryant district decided to close the school effective 2006 and consolidate it into Bryant High School, but parents advocated for keeping the school open. They first lobbied the Arkansas Board of Education, and when that failed they filed a lawsuit against the school district. The Bryant school district successfully closed the school in 2006. Bryant High is about 30 miles (48 km) by school bus. Some residents expressed interest in sending their children to public high schools in other school districts that were geographically closer to Paron, although not every parent had the resources to drive their children to other schools and/or to bus stops for other districts' schools.

In 2006 a former janitor from Paron High gave a threat towards the superintendent of Bryant schools. In 2007 he pleaded guilty and received four years of probation. Rodney Bowers of Arkansas Online stated that this "apparently" was because of the closure of the school.

== Academics ==
As of 2006 Paron High had about 40 courses available. Jennifer Barnett Reed and Max Brantley of the Arkansas Times stated that even though there were more courses available at Bryant High School, 160 in total, Paron-area residents thought consolidation was unnecessary because "The prevailing attitude seems to be that Paron students are doing fine" as they could enter state colleges and universities without taking remedial courses and performed at the state average in tests.

Paron-area students who wished to take courses not available at Paron High were eligible to transfer to public high schools in other school districts.

== Athletics ==
Historically basketball was the primary competitive sport at Paron High. The other teams were softball, baseball.
