= Sardis, Arkansas =

- Census-designated place
- Location within Arkansas Location within the United States
- Coordinates: 34°31′59″N 92°24′24″W
- Country: United States
- State: Arkansas
- County: Saline
- Elevation: 364 ft (111 m)

Population (2020)
  - Total: 833
- Time zone: UTC-6 (Central (CST))
  - Summer (DST): UTC-5 (CDT)
- GNIS feature ID: 2805685

Sardis is an unincorporated community and census-designated place (CDP) in southeast Saline County, Arkansas, United States. It is part of the Little Rock-North Little Rock-AR Metropolitan Statistical Area. It was first listed as a CDP in the 2020 census with a population of 833.

The community is approximately six miles east-southeast of Bauxite and four miles southwest of East End. Hurricane Creek flows past approximately one mile west of the site.

Sardis is part of the Bryant Public School District.

== Demographics ==
Historical population
Census	Pop.	Note	%±
2020	833		—
U.S. Decennial Census; 2020

=== 2020 census ===
Sardis CDP, Arkansas – Demographic Profile (NH = Non-Hispanic) Note: the US Census treats Hispanic/Latino as an ethnic category. This table excludes Latinos from the racial categories and assigns them to a separate category. Hispanics/Latinos may be of any race.
Race / Ethnicity	Pop 2020	% 2020
White alone (NH)	724	86.91%
Black or African American alone (NH)	12	1.44%
Native American or Alaska Native alone (NH)	3	0.36%
Asian alone (NH)	6	0.72%
Pacific Islander alone (NH)	0	0.00%
Some Other Race alone (NH)	5	0.60%
Mixed Race/Multi-Racial (NH)	43	5.16%
Hispanic or Latino (any race)	40	4.80%
Total	833	100.00%
