= Paron, Arkansas =

- Unincorporated community
- Location within Arkansas Location within the United States
- Coordinates: 34°46′22″N 92°45′31″W
- Country: United States
- State: Arkansas
- County: Saline
- Elevation: 492 ft (150 m)
- Time zone: UTC-6 (Central (CST))
  - Summer (DST): UTC-5 (CDT)
- ZIP code: 72122
- Area code: 501
- GNIS feature ID: 73008

Paron is an unincorporated community in Saline County, Arkansas, United States. Paron is located along Arkansas Highway 9, 17.5 miles (28.2 km) northwest of Benton. Paron has a post office with ZIP code 72122.

In 2006 Jennifer Barnett-Reed and Max Brantley of the Arkansas Times stated that the only community institutions Paron had were area churches and the schools; the latter were in operation at the time, but have since closed, with students now assigned to schools in Bryant.

== Demographics ==
As of 2006 some residents of Paron moved there from urban areas in Central Arkansas while others were born in families that owned land in the Paron area for multiple generations. In 2006 Jennifer Barnett-Reed and Max Brantley of the Arkansas Times stated that Paron, which "doesn’t seem" to have had an accurate population count from any organization or agency, "probably" had a population in the hundreds. The average age is 54. 97.65 percent of the Paron population was born in the United States.

== Economy ==
Circa 2006 most residents work in Benton, Bryant, and Little Rock, while some have construction and farming jobs in Paron. Reed and Brantley stated "within probably" 15 miles (24 km) to 20 miles (32 km) there are no retail stores nor gas stations. 57.49% of Paron works white collar jobs. 6.12% of Paron is self employed, 73.39% works for private companies, 11.62% are governmental workers.

== Education ==
Paron, a part of the Bryant School District, is served by Salem Elementary School, in Bryant, about 21 miles (34 km) from Paron, and Bryant High School, in Bryant. As of 2006 Paron area students are eligible to attend public schools in other school districts.

The community was initially in the Paron School District, which operated Paron Elementary School and Paron High School. On July 1, 2004, the Paron School District merged into the Bryant School District. Paron High School initially remained open before closing in 2006 due to Paron being considered a rural area. Students that attended the school were transferred to Bryant High School. In 2015, the Bryant district voted to close Paron Elementary School. At the time it had about 75 students. Paron students were reassigned to Salem Elementary School.

In 2006 Reed and Brantley stated that since most residents can be admitted to state-operated universities and colleges without needing to take remedial courses and perform at the state average on standardized tests, "[t]he prevailing attitude seems to be that Paron students are doing fine [academically]".

In 2016 there was a proposal to establish a charter school in Paron in the former Paron public school as a result of the closure of the public elementary, due to safety concerns related to the commutes to Paron or to the Perryville School District facilities. That year the Arkansas Department of Education panel overseeing such requests declined this proposal, mainly because of lack of expertise and support. But they were encouraged to polish up the application and apply again the next year. The community decided not to apply the immediate year after the rejection.

In 2021 another community-backed effort to establish a charter school occurred. In 2022 the community submitted plans for a K-12 charter school in Paron to the state authorities. As of now, the community is once again in the process of getting a school back in Paron. The community will be sending in their letter of intent in January 2022. This time things are looking like they have a good shot of getting a school back.

== Climate ==
The climate in this area is characterized by hot, humid summers and generally mild to cool winters. According to the Köppen Climate Classification system, Paron has a humid subtropical climate, abbreviated "Cfa" on climate maps.
