= Lynne Patton =

African-American event planner

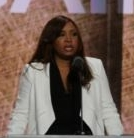

White House Director of Minority Outreach
- Incumbent
- Assumed office January 24, 2025
- President: Donald Trump

Administrator of the United States Department of Housing and Urban Development for Region II
- In office July 5, 2017 – January 20, 2021
- President: Donald Trump

Personal details
- Born: Lynne Martine Patton; 1973 (age 52–53)
- Party: Republican
- Education: University of Miami (BA); Quinnipiac University

Lynne Martine Patton (born 1973) is Deputy Assistant to the President for Coalition Policy and Engagement in the second Trump administration who previously served as Regional Director of United States Department of Housing and Urban Development (HUD) during the first Trump administration.

She was designated in June 2017 by President Donald Trump to head Region II of the United States Department of Housing and Urban Development (HUD), which oversees New York and New Jersey, and remained in the role until Trump left office in January 2021. She was twice found to have violated the Hatch Act, a federal law restricting the political activities of federal executive-branch employees, and in 2021 was fined and barred from government service for four years.

Before she was appointed to HUD, Patton worked as an event planner for the Trump family, including planning the wedding of Eric Trump, and helping to run the Eric Trump Foundation. She was a speaker at the 2016 Republican National Convention.

== Early life and education ==
Patton grew up in New Haven, Connecticut, in the Westville neighborhood. Her father, epidemiologist Curtis L. Patton, was a professor (and is now professor emeritus) at Yale University.

Patton graduated from the University of Miami with a B.A. in English literature. She attended the Quinnipiac University School of Law for two semesters, and did not graduate. On her LinkedIn page, Patton previously claimed an affiliation with Yale University, which she had never attended.

== Career ==
=== Work for Trump family and Trump 2016 campaign ===
Patton planned the wedding of Eric Trump. She was a longtime personal assistant for Eric Trump, as well as others in the Trump family and The Trump Organization. An Eric Trump Foundation staff biography of Patton states that she was involved in casting the 2012 and 2014 seasons of The Celebrity Apprentice.

Patton was one of 16 unpaid directors at the Eric Trump Foundation, though her position did not appear in the Foundation's 2014 tax filings. Her HUD financial disclosures stated that she had been a vice president and a board member at the Eric Trump Foundation from January 2009 to January 2017, and she speaks of being with the Trump family since 2009.

In May 2016, during Donald Trump's 2016 presidential campaign, Patton narrated a video in which she defended Trump against allegations of racism; the video garnered millions of views on YouTube. Although Patton described herself in a Trump campaign video as an executive at the Trump Organization, she was in fact a personal assistant; after the Associated Press inquired about her role, the Eric Trump Foundation website and Patton's LinkedIn profile changed to describe her as "vice president of the Eric Trump Foundation." She spoke at the 2016 Republican National Convention; the convention program listed her position as "Vice President of The Eric Trump Foundation and Senior Assistant to Eric Trump, Ivanka Trump, and Donald Trump Jr." In her convention speech, she acknowledged historical racism, but said that "Donald Trump knows that your life matters. He knows that my life matters. He knows the LGBTQ lives matter. He knows that veterans lives matter. And he knows that blue lives matter." Later in the campaign, Patton joined other campaign spokeswomen on the Trump-Pence Women's Empowerment Tour.

She was a director of National Diversity Coalition for Trump.

=== First Trump administration ===
In January 2017, Patton was appointed a White House liaison and Director of Public Liaison for the United States Department of Housing and Urban Development. Since the Trump Organization co-owns some properties that receive federal rental subsidies from HUD, her position raised questions of conflict of interest.

From July 5, 2017, to January 2021, Patton was head of HUD Region II, covering New York and New Jersey. She had no experience with housing policy. U.S. representatives Grace Meng and Nydia Velázquez, both Democrats from New York, urged the administration to reconsider the appointment.

In January 2018, Patton apologized after calling April Ryan, the White House correspondent and Washington bureau chief for American Urban Radio Networks, "Miss Piggy".

In September 2018, Patton commented positively with two emojis on an Instagram post by Donald Trump Jr., the president's son, mocking the sexual assault allegation against Trump's Supreme Court nominee Brett Kavanaugh. That same month, Patton made misleading posts on social media suggesting that CNN "is #FakeNews."

Patton's tenure at HUD was marked by publicity stunts. In November 2018, Patton claimed that she would be moving from her New York apartment in Trump Plaza to New York City Housing Authority (NYCHA) public housing, saying, "It was not okay for me to preside over the largest housing crisis in the nation from the warmth and comfort of my own safe and sanitary apartment while NYCHA residents continue to suffer the most inhumane conditions." Patton blamed the housing authority for ineptitude and indifference to the conditions "suffered by hard working residents." She began an announced month-long stay in NYCHA housing on February 11, 2019.

Patton also made a "surprise cameo" at a hearing of Michael Cohen, a former Trump attorney. At the February 2019 House Oversight Committee hearing, Republican congressman Mark Meadows presented Patton at the hearing, to rebut Cohen's assertion that Trump is a "racist." This prompted a sharp exchange later between Meadows and Rep. Rashida Tlaib, who asserted, "The fact that someone would actually use a prop, a black woman, in this chamber in this committee is alone racist in itself." After being pressed by committee chairman Elijah Cummings (D-MD) on what she meant, Tlaib clarified her remarks and apologized to Meadows. Patton also asked about the possibility of starring in a reality television program; and used the Trump family name in an unsuccessful attempt to have a HUD employee fired.

In August 2019, she responded to the suicide of accused underage sex trafficker Jeffrey Epstein with an Instagram post that promoted unfounded conspiracy theories about Vince Foster's 1993 suicide; Patton suggested that both men had been killed by Hillary Clinton.

==== Hatch Act violations ====
From December 2017 and April 2018, Patton used her government Twitter account to "like" partisan tweets; in 2019, the Office of Special Counsel (OSC) determined that these actions violated the Hatch Act, which prohibits employees of the federal executive branch from engaging in certain political activities. In May 2019, when asked about potential Hatch Act violations, Patton said "I honestly don't care." The OSC issued Patton a warning letter in September 2019 for two violations of the Hatch Act; the office issued her a reprimand, but decided not to pursue disciplinary action. The OSC cleared Patton of two other alleged violations.

In 2020, Patton tricked four New Yorkers into appearing in a video that was broadcast during the final night of the 2020 Republican National Convention. Patton unexpectedly called the leader of a NYCHA tenants' association, telling them that she was interested in speaking with tenants about poor public housing conditions, and personally interviewed four tenants for four hours. The tenants' comments were edited down to a two-minute video clip that was played at the Republican convention; the video attacked New York City mayor Bill de Blasio and suggested that the tenants were Trump supporters. The tenants, who were never told the true purpose of the interviews, were angered; one of the tenants said she was not a Trump supporter and disapproved "of his racist policies on immigration." Patton denied deceiving the residents. Several watchdog groups, including the Campaign for Accountability and Citizens for Responsibility and Ethics in Washington, filed complaints with OSC over the video. In April 2021, Patton reached a settlement with OSC over violations of the Hatch Act in regard to the incident. She admitted to violating the Hatch Act, agreed to pay a $1,000 fine, and accepted a four-year (48-month) ban from federal employment. The OSC issued a statement saying, "By using information and NYCHA connections available to her solely by virtue of her HUD position, Patton improperly harnessed the authority of her federal position to assist the Trump campaign in violation of the Hatch Act."

After the complaint with Patton was filed, the Project On Government Oversight wrote a letter expressing concerns of bias, given that Patton, a Black woman, was the only Trump administration appointee against whom OSC filed a Hatch Act complaint.

=== Trump 2024 campaign ===
Patton was a senior advisor to the Donald Trump 2024 presidential campaign.

=== Second Trump administration ===
On January 24, 2025, Patton was appointed as a deputy assistant to the president and Director of Minority Outreach.

== Personal life ==
Patton says she has struggled with substance abuse and addiction, and publicly praised the Trump family for standing by her through tough times.
