= East End, Arkansas =

- CDP
- Location in Saline County and the state of Arkansas
- Coordinates: 34°32′52″N 92°20′18″W
- Country: United States
- State: Arkansas
- County: Saline

Area
  - Total: 20.28 sq mi (52.52 km^{2})
  - Land: 20.06 sq mi (51.96 km^{2})
  - Water: 0.22 sq mi (0.56 km^{2})
- Elevation: 318 ft (97 m)

Population (2020)
  - Total: 7,137
  - Density: 355.8/sq mi (137.36/km^{2})
- Time zone: UTC-6 (Central (CST))
  - Summer (DST): UTC-5 (CDT)
- ZIP code: 72065, 72206, and 72103
- Area code: 501
- FIPS code: 05-20470
- GNIS feature ID: 2402426

East End is a census-designated place (CDP) in Saline County, Arkansas, United States. As of the 2020 census, East End had a population of 7,137. It is part of the Little Rock–North Little Rock–Conway Metropolitan Statistical Area.

== Geography ==
East End's nearest neighboring communities are Landmark, Shannon Hills, Bauxite and Sheridan.

According to the United States Census Bureau, the CDP has a total area of 20.3 square miles (53 km^{2}), of which 20.1 square miles (52 km^{2}) is land and 0.2 square miles (0.52 km^{2}) (1.13%) is water.

East End has been the home of Marylake Carmelite Monastery since the 1950s.

== Demographics ==
Historical population
| Census | Pop. | Note | %± |
|---|---|---|---|
| 2020 | 7,137 | | — |
U.S. Decennial Census

=== 2020 census ===
As of the 2020 census, East End had a population of 7,137. The median age was 41.8 years. 23.7% of residents were under the age of 18 and 16.2% were 65 years of age or older. For every 100 females, there were 99.1 males, and for every 100 females age 18 and over, there were 95.6 males age 18 and over.

0.0% of residents lived in urban areas, while 100.0% lived in rural areas.

There were 2,717 households in East End, including 1,787 families. Of all households, 31.5% had children under the age of 18, 56.6% were married-couple households, 16.2% were households with a male householder and no spouse or partner present, and 21.3% were households with a female householder and no spouse or partner present. About 22.0% of all households were made up of individuals, and 8.1% had someone living alone who was 65 years of age or older.

There were 2,897 housing units, of which 6.2% were vacant. The homeowner vacancy rate was 1.6%, and the rental vacancy rate was 5.3%.

East End racial composition
| Race | Number | Percentage |
|---|---|---|
| White (non-Hispanic) | 5,929 | 83.07% |
| Black or African American (non-Hispanic) | 298 | 4.18% |
| Native American | 29 | 0.41% |
| Asian | 138 | 1.93% |
| Pacific Islander | 1 | 0.01% |
| Other/Mixed | 362 | 5.07% |
| Hispanic or Latino | 380 | 5.32% |

=== 2000 census ===
As of the census of 2000, there were 5,623 people, 2,049 households, and 1,643 families residing in the CDP. The population density was 279.6 inhabitants per square mile (108.0/km^{2}). There were 2,170 housing units at an average density of 107.9 per square mile (41.7/km^{2}). The racial makeup of the CDP was 95.87% White, 0.87% Black or African American, 0.66% Native American, 0.87% Asian, 0.05% Pacific Islander, 0.32% from other races, and 1.35% from two or more races. 1.28% of the population were Hispanic or Latino of any race.

There were 2,049 households, out of which 41.0% had children under the age of 18 living with them, 67.1% were married couples living together, 9.2% had a female householder with no husband present, and 19.8% were non-families. 15.9% of all households were made up of individuals, and 4.1% had someone living alone who was 65 years of age or older. The average household size was 2.74 and the average family size was 3.06.

In the CDP, the population was spread out, with 28.1% under the age of 18, 7.7% from 18 to 24, 33.4% from 25 to 44, 24.4% from 45 to 64, and 6.4% who were 65 years of age or older. The median age was 34 years. For every 100 females, there were 103.0 males. For every 100 females age 18 and over, there were 98.8 males.

The median income for a household in the CDP was $46,678, and the median income for a family was $49,649. Males had a median income of $31,396 versus $24,831 for females. The per capita income for the CDP was $19,198. About 4.3% of families and 6.1% of the population were below the poverty line, including 8.3% of those under age 18 and 7.7% of those age 65 or over.

== Education ==
East End's schools are part of the Sheridan School District. The East End schools include East End Elementary grades K-2, East End Intermediate grades 3–5, and East End Middle grades 6–8.
