= Ian Stuart Spiro =

Commodity broker and murderer (1946–1992)

Ian Stuart Spiro (14 December 1946 – 8 November 1992) was a commodities broker who in 1992 murdered his wife and children, then killed himself. Police stated that he was a "low-level conduit by United States government intelligence agencies and the United Kingdom's MI-6" from 1981 to 1986, and the case stirred a conspiracy theory that the family was murdered by assassins or terrorists because of Spiro's history as an intelligence operative.

== Background ==
In the 1980's Spiro worked for the CIA and London intelligence in Lebanon. He assisted Oliver North in the attempts to free US hostages there during the Lebanon hostage crisis. In 1985 he helped arrange meetings in Lebanon between Terry Waite and leaders of the Islamic Jihad Organization in order to negotiate the release of western hostages.

The Spiro family had lived in Beirut, France, Switzerland, London and New York before renting the $1,000,000 house in San Diego in August 1991. Spiro sold the house in Switzerland to a Saudi prince.

They were renting the San Diego property at $5,000 per month. By the time of the murders, the rent had not been paid in three months.

Two weeks before the murders, Spiro claimed to a friend that he had received numerous telephone threats. Spiro asked the friend, a lawyer named James W. Street, if he could borrow a firearm from him. On October 22, 1992, Street gave Spiro a .38-caliber Smith & Wesson revolver.

== Murders ==
On November 2, 1992, the maid arrived at the Spiro house for work, but was told by Ian Spiro that there was no work for her to do. When the maid asked why not, Spiro replied “Because my wife and kids are not here." and drove the maid back to the migrant camp. Investigators believe that the four family members were murdered on late November 1st or early November 2nd.

On November 5, Spiro's wife, Gail Spiro, 41, his daughters, Sara, 16, and Dina, 11—as well as their son, Adam, 14, were found shot to death in their beds in their luxurious, rented home in the Covenant section of Rancho Santa Fe, California, north of San Diego. Each had been shot in the head execution-style with a large caliber handgun as they slept. For the ensuing three days, Spiro was the only suspect in the slaying. At 3:57 p.m. on November 8, Spiro was found dead behind the wheel of his Ford Explorer in a rocky canyon on the western edge of the Anza-Borrego Desert by campers. It was subsequently found that he died of cyanide poisoning two or three days before being found and the case was officially declared a murder-suicide ostensibly sparked by pressure from the family's alleged financial problems.

No murder weapon was ever found.

Shortly after his body was found, suitcases and a briefcase were found by hikers 3 miles (4.8 km) from Spiros body. Inside an audiotape was found where what is believed to be Spiro's voice talks about his financial problems and his wife threatening to leave him. Family members of Spiro contested this, with his brother-in-law saying that the Spiro family had endured financial hardships in the past without breaking up.

== Conspiracy theories ==
Spiro's death has been tied to the Inslaw affair and the Clinton body count conspiracy theory. His brother-in-law believed the CIA or Mossad was involved in his death.
