= Bryant, Arkansas =

- City
- Flag Logo
- Motto: Geographical center of ARKANSAS"
- Location of Bryant in Saline County, Arkansas.
- Coordinates: 34°37′49″N 92°30′25″W
- Country: United States
- State: Arkansas
- County: Saline

Government
  - Mayor: Chris Treat
  - City Clerk: Mark Smith
  - City Council: Lisa Meyer; Wade Permenter; Jon Martin; Walter Burgess; Butch Higginbotham; Rob Roedel; Jack Moseley; Jordan O'Roark

Area
  - Total: 20.58 sq mi (53.31 km^{2})
  - Land: 20.49 sq mi (53.08 km^{2})
  - Water: 0.089 sq mi (0.23 km^{2})
- Elevation: 377 ft (115 m)

Population (2020)
  - Total: 20,663
  - Estimate (2025): 22,815 ▲
  - Density: 1,008.2/sq mi (389.28/km^{2})
- Time zone: UTC-6 (Central (CST))
  - Summer (DST): UTC-5 (CDT)
- ZIP codes: 72022, 72089
- Area code: 501
- FIPS code: 05-09460
- GNIS feature ID: 2403945
- Website: www.bryantar.gov

Bryant is a city in Saline County, Arkansas, United States and a suburb of Little Rock. According to the 2020 census, the population of the city was 20,663. It is part of the Central Arkansas region.

== History ==
European settlers established themselves along Hurricane Creek in the early 19th century. A skirmish in the area occurred during the American Civil War. Rail service in the 1870s brought development. The town was hard hit by economic struggles in the early 20th century and through the Great Depression. World War II era saw development as demand for the area's bauxite grew.

== Geography ==
According to the United States Census Bureau, the city has a total area of 9.1 square miles (24 km^{2}), of which 9.1 square miles (24 km^{2}) is land and 0.04 square miles (0.10 km^{2}) (0.33%) is water.

== Demographics ==
Historical population
Census	Pop.	Note	%±
1900	113		—
1910	91		−19.5%
1920	132		45.1%
1930	162		22.7%
1940	173		6.8%
1950	387		123.7%
1960	737		90.4%
1970	1,199		62.7%
1980	2,682		123.7%
1990	5,269		96.5%
2000	9,764		85.3%
2010	16,688		70.9%
2020	20,663		23.8%
2025 (est.)	22,815	▲	10.4%
U.S. Decennial Census

=== 2020 census ===
As of the 2020 census, Bryant had a population of 20,663 and contained 8,394 households and 5,260 families. The median age was 37.2 years. 24.6% of residents were under the age of 18 and 15.5% of residents were 65 years of age or older. For every 100 females there were 87.6 males, and for every 100 females age 18 and over there were 84.0 males age 18 and over.

Of the 8,394 households, 34.1% had children under the age of 18 living in them. Of all households, 46.8% were married-couple households, 16.8% were households with a male householder and no spouse or partner present, and 30.9% were households with a female householder and no spouse or partner present. About 27.9% of all households were made up of individuals and 10.4% had someone living alone who was 65 years of age or older.

There were 8,950 housing units, of which 6.2% were vacant. The homeowner vacancy rate was 1.6% and the rental vacancy rate was 8.1%.

97.8% of residents lived in urban areas, while 2.2% lived in rural areas.

Racial composition as of the 2020 census
Race	Number	Percent
White	14,806	71.7%
Black or African American	3,213	15.5%
American Indian and Alaska Native	128	0.6%
Asian	478	2.3%
Native Hawaiian and Other Pacific Islander	8	0.0%
Some other race	669	3.2%
Two or more races	1,361	6.6%
Hispanic or Latino (of any race)	1,376	6.7%

=== 2000 census ===
As of the census of 2000, there were 9,764 people, 3,601 households, and 2,823 families residing in the city. The population density was 1,076.4 inhabitants per square mile (415.6/km^{2}). There were 3,762 housing units at an average density of 414.7 per square mile (160.1/km^{2}). The racial makeup of the city was 95.2% White, 1.5% Black or African American, 0.34% Native American, 1.05% Asian, 0.37% from other races, and 0.84% from two or more races. 1.05% of the population were Hispanic or Latino of any race.

There were 3,601 households, out of which 42.6% had children under the age of 18 living with them, 63.9% were married couples living together, 11.1% had a female householder with no husband present, and 21.6% were non-families. 19.1% of all households were made up of individuals, and 7.0% had someone living alone who was 65 years of age or older. The average household size was 2.65 and the average family size was 3.03.

In the city, the population was spread out, with 27.9% under the age of 18, 7.1% from 18 to 24, 32.7% from 25 to 44, 21.8% from 45 to 64, and 10.4% who were 65 years of age or older. The median age was 35 years. For every 100 females, there were 89.8 males. For every 100 females age 18 and over, there were 86.5 males.

The median income for a household in the city was $48,870, and the median income for a family was $56,038. Males had a median income of $39,380 versus $26,261 for females. The per capita income for the city was $20,730. About 3.5% of families and 4.8% of the population were below the poverty line, including 6.1% of those under age 18 and 8.0% of those age 65 or over.

== Water supply ==
Bryant purchases treated surface water from Lake Maumelle and Lake Winona from Central Arkansas Water.

== Government and infrastructure ==
The Arkansas Department of Human Services Arkansas Juvenile Assessment & Treatment Center (AJATC) is located in Bryant.

The U.S. Postal Service operates the Bryant Post Office.

== Education ==
Public education for elementary and secondary school students is provided by the Bryant School District, with students graduating from Bryant High School.

== Notable people ==
- Karen Aston - Women's basketball head coach, University of Texas at San Antonio
- Sean Michel - Musician
- Travis Wood - Major League Baseball pitcher
