= Brooks, Arkansas =

Coordinates: 34°33′58″N 92°26′52″W

- Unincorporated community
- Interactive map of Brooks, Arkansas
- Country: United States
- State: Arkansas
- County: Saline County

Brooks is an unincorporated community in Central Arkansas about four miles east of Bauxite on Arkansas Route 111 in Saline County, Arkansas, United States.
