= Paron School District =

Defunct school district in Arkansas, United States

Paron School District No. 2 was a school district headquartered in Paron, an unincorporated area in Saline County, Arkansas, United States.

It operated Paron Elementary School (K-6) and Paron High School (7-12).

On July 1, 2004, it merged into the Bryant School District. This merger occurred due to a state law which required a school district with fewer than 350 students to merge with another school district. At the time the district's fund balance was decreasing in size, and the state was about to rule the district as being in financial distress.
