= The Saline Courier =

Daily newspaper in Saline County, Arkansas

Saline Courier
- Type: Daily newspaper
- Owner(s): Horizon Publications
- Founder(s): W. A. Webber
- Founded: 1876
- Headquarters: Benton, Arkansas
- Circulation: 6,500
- Website: bentoncourier.com

The Saline Courier (formerly the Benton Courier) is a daily newspaper serving Saline County, Arkansas. It is published in print and online.

== History ==
The Courier started its life as the Saline County Digest, founded in 1876 by W. A. Webber. In 1882 it was bought by B. A. Beavers and given the name the Saline County Review, before being bought by S. H. Whitthorne and named the Saline Courier in 1883. In 1888 it was sold to Col. T. C. Mays and renamed it the Benton Courier. After a brief period as the Times-Courier it was purchased by L. B. White in 1905 it once again became the Benton Courier and would be published under that name until 2010.

The paper changed owners twice in the 1990s, first being bought by Hollinger Inc. in 1996, and then Horizon Publications in 1999.
