= Marylake Carmelite Monastery =

Carmelite monastery near Little Rock, Arkansas

Coordinates: 34°32′19″N 92°20′26″W

The sign by the entrance of the Marylake Carmelite Monastery.

The Marylake Carmelite Monastery is a monastery for men seeking to become members of the Discalced Carmelites, a Catholic mendicant order.

== History ==
Marylake Carmelite Monastery in the spring of 2010.

The area was first the Shrine Country Club of Little Rock, built in 1926. After the failure of the country club, the infamous Dr. John R. Brinkley set up shop in what he declared was "The World's Most Beautiful Hospital."

On December 22, 1951, the wife of L. G. LeTorneau agreed to sell what was then known as "Pine Lake Camp" to the Carmelite Friars. Br. Victor Kopycinski then moved to the building to prepare it for the arrival of a community of friars. Friar Felix DaPrato was elected Prior and offered the first Mass there on May 4, 1952. The chapel was dedicated on July 25 of the same year by Bishop Albert Fletcher, and after an "open house" of three days, he blessed the monastery and imposed the cloister on Sunday, July 27, 1952. The Marylake Cemetery was dedicated on October 26, 1966.

== Present day ==
Today it is still used as an occasional monastery for the Carmelite Brothers, but is no longer in full time use. Men wanting to become members underwent a year of intense prayer and training of Carmelite life at the monastery.

== Location ==
The monastery is located 15 miles south of Little Rock, Arkansas at 5151 Marylake Drive in East End, Arkansas.
