= Sean Michel =

- Michel performing in South Carolina

Background information
- Born: August 21, 1979 (age 47)
- Origin: New Orleans, Louisiana
- Occupation: Musician

Sean Michel (born August 21,1979) is a musician from Bryant, Arkansas. He gained recognition with his participation in American Idol Season 6 after spending several years touring with his band.

== Early life ==
Michel was born in 1979 in New Orleans, Louisiana. His family relocated near Little Rock, Arkansas in the early nineties. Michel was raised with many religious backgrounds, with his grandparents being catholic, his mother being pentecostal and his father an atheist.

== Career ==
=== Early career (2003-2009) ===
In 2003, Michel returned from a mission trip to China and enlisted friend and bassist Nick Taylor to join his live band. Joie Lyle joined the group in 2005 and they began touring.

In 2006, Michel auditioned for American Idol in Memphis, Tennessee, and worked in both Memphis and Hollywood as part of his American Idol obligations. He was filmed for the show performing Johnny Cash's "God's Gonna Cut You Down," which earned him a "yes" from all three judges. The episode aired in January 2007.

In 2007 the band recorded their inaugural full-length album, The Thrill of Hope, released in December 2007.

=== Modern career (2009-present) ===
In the absence of a band to accompany his performances, Michel sought the assistance of his long-standing friend, Andy Turner, to create demo recordings for works in progress.

During the early months of 2009, Michel crossed paths with guitarist Alvin Rapien, a fellow member of the same church community. Their collaboration led to Alvin Rapien assuming the role of Michel's guitarist. Concurrently, Michel embarked on a solo tour spanning over two months, covering regions in India and Nepal.

Towards the end of 2009, Michel unveiled I Know I've Been Converted, an album deeply influenced by the blues. The record featured his interpretations of traditional spirituals alongside original compositions. Although the album did not have an official release date, physical copies became available in late 2009, with digital downloads following in 2010.

In the year 2010, Michel received an invitation to visit Chile, where he actively participated in relief efforts following the devastating 2010 Chile earthquake. Michel organized a band to perform numerous shows throughout the country during this period. It was during this time that bassist Seth Atchley became a part of the band's lineup.

In 2011, Michel announced a fundraising campaign for a forthcoming album project. Michel, along with his collaborators, managed the Arkansas Stage at the Cornerstone Festival for the third consecutive year in 2011. Over this period, they transformed it from an independent "generator stage" into a prominent attraction, achieving notable success by the festival's final year in 2012. By this juncture, Michel had established himself as a proficient guitarist leading a formidable blues-oriented trio. The resultant album, titled Electric Delta, featuring Atchley and Batterton, was officially released in 2013.

After the conclusion of the final Cornerstone Festival in 2012, Michel played a key role in launching the AudioFeed Festival in Urbana, Illinois. Beginning in 2013, he became a featured performer, appearing on a restructured Arkansas Stage, which has since become one of the festival’s main stages.

In July 2016, Michel initiated a Kickstarter campaign to fund a new album project that would center on "Roots Gospel music." This project aimed to blend original gospel compositions with traditional tunes and was slated to be produced and engineered by Paul Moak at Smoakstack Studios in Nashville. Notable musicians, including Jimmy Abegg, Aaron Smith, and Eddie DeGarmo, were scheduled to contribute to the recording process.

== Discography ==
Studio albums

- “Sketches” (2005)
- The Thrill of Hope (2007)
- I Know I've Been Converted (2009)
- Back To The Delta (2012)
- Electric Delta (2013)
- Untitled (2017)
