= Bryant High School (Arkansas) =

Location
- 201 Sullivan Drive; Bryant, Saline, Arkansas 72022; United States

Information
- Type: Public
- Motto: "Motivate, Educate, Challenge"
- Founded: 1916
- Status: Open
- School district: Bryant School District
- Superintendent: Karen Walters
- CEEB code: 040310
- NCES School ID: 050369000118
- Principal: Jason Hay
- Teaching staff: 145.16 (FTE)
- Grades: 10–12
- Age range: 15-18
- Enrollment: 2,290 (2023-2024)
- Student to teacher ratio: 15.78
- Classes offered: Regular; Career Focus; Advanced Placement
- Colors: Blue and white
- Athletics: Tennis, Swimming, Football, Baseball, Basketball, Softball, Volleyball, Cheerleading, Dance, Wrestling, Soccer
- Mascot: Hornet
- Team name: Bryant Hornets
- Rivals: Benton (Salt Bowl); Conway
- Accreditation: ADE
- Yearbook: Hornet
- Website: www.bryantschools.org/o/bhs

Bryant High School (BHS) is a comprehensive public high school in Bryant, Arkansas, United States. BHS serves grades 10 through 12 and is a part of the Bryant Public Schools District. With more than 2,300 students, Bryant High School is the largest of four public high schools in Saline County, Arkansas.

== History ==
In 2006 Paron High School closed, so the community of Paron was added to the attendance zone of Bryant High School. Paron is about 30 miles (48 km) away from the school.

== Academics ==
The assumed course of study follows the Smart Core curriculum developed by the Arkansas Department of Education (ADE), which requires students to complete at least 22 units prior to graduation. Students complete regular (core and career focus) classes and exams and may select Advanced Placement (AP) coursework and exams that may result in college credit. Bryant High School is accredited by the ADE.

=== Awards and recognition ===
Bryant is one of twenty high schools to be recognized with the 2012 College Readiness Award by the Arkansas ACT Council in recognition of improving the participation rate of students taking the ACT college readiness exam.

The school's yearbook, the Hornet, was awarded a 2012, 2013, 2018 Columbia Scholastic Press Association (CSPA) Gold Crown, the organization's highest award. The Prospective school newspaper won a 2013 CSPA Silver Crown Award.

== Students ==
There are 2,429 students and 156 teachers at this school, making the student to teacher ratio 16 to 1, slightly above the national average.

There are currently 521 in Grade 10, 487 in Grade 11, and 433 in Grade 12. 988 students are male, and 994 female. The ethnic breakdown is 1015 white, 37 Asian/pacific islander, 240 Hispanic, 682 black, and 8 Native American students.

The student economic level is above average. 15% of students receive free or reduced price lunch. This school is not a title 1 school, which means the school does not receive federal assistance.

This school has been tested by the Arkansas Comprehensive Testing, Assessment and Accountability Program (ACTAAP). Grades 4, 6, 8, and 11 were tested. The scale is based on percent of students performing at or above achievement level 1.

== Extracurricular activities ==
The Bryant mascot and athletic emblem is the Hornet with blue and white serving as its school colors.

=== Athletic ===
The Bryant Hornets compete in the state's largest classification—7A Classification administered by the Arkansas Activities Association. Bryant competes in the 7A/6A South Conference. The Hornets provide teams in football, volleyball, golf (boys/girls), cross country (boys/girls), basketball (boys/girls), competitive cheer, competitive dance, baseball, softball, soccer (boys/girls), swimming (boys/girls), tennis (boys/girls), track and field (boys/girls), and wrestling (boys/girls).

- Tennis: The boys tennis teams won consecutive state championships in 1972 and 1973.
- Cross Country: The boys cross country teams won consecutive state championships in 1991 and 1992. The girls cross country teams have won two state championships (1995, 2002).
- Basketball: The Hornets boys basketball team won its first state basketball championship in 1981. They were the state runners-up in 2019. The Lady Hornets basketball teams have won four state championship titles (1982, 1988, 1989, 1991).
- Baseball: The Hornets baseball team won its first state baseball championship in 2010, with 3 more in 2012, 2014, and 2016. Coach Kirk Bock won the 2016 National Coach of the Year for baseball by the National Federation of State High School Associations (NFHS) Coaches Association.
- Softball: The girls softball teams have won six state championships with three consecutive state fastpitch titles in 2010, 2011 and 2012 after winning slowpitch softball titles in 1996, 1997 and 1999.
- Track and Field: The boys track team won their first state championship in 2015.
- Football : The Hornet Football Team won their first Class 7A State championship in 2018, and then repeated as State champions in 2019, 2020, 2021, and 2022, making it five in a row. Bryant won their 7th state championship in 2025.

=== Cheerleaders ===
Students of the 2013-2014 squad won nationals in Florida. The first national championship Bryant cheerleaders have won in the history of Bryant High School.

Students of the 2014-2015 squad won Worlds in Florida.

Esports

Their Rocket League team won the first Arkansas State title in Spring 2019. They are tied for first in most wins in the country according to a USA Today article.

Their League of Legends team regularly ranks top 8 in the state. They are tied for 25th in most wins in the country, according to a USA Today article.

== Notable alumni ==
- Blaine Knight (class of 2015), MiLB pitcher for the Baltimore Orioles organization
- Evan Lee (class of 2016), MLB pitcher for the Washington Nationals
- Silvia Hernández Sánchez (class of 1996), President of the Legislative Assembly of Costa Rica
- Travis Wood (class of 2005), former MLB pitcher for the Cincinnati Reds, Chicago Cubs, Kansas City Royals, and San Diego Padres
