= Avilla, Arkansas =

- Census-designated place
- Location of Avilla in Saline County, Arkansas.

- Location within Arkansas
- Coordinates: 34°42′01″N 92°34′46″W
- Country: United States
- State: Arkansas
- County: Saline

Area
  - Total: 6.35 sq mi (16.44 km^{2})
  - Land: 6.32 sq mi (16.38 km^{2})
  - Water: 0.023 sq mi (0.06 km^{2})
- Elevation: 584 ft (178 m)

Population (2020)
  - Total: 1,325
  - Density: 209.5/sq mi (80.88/km^{2})
- Time zone: UTC-6 (Central (CST))
  - Summer (DST): UTC-5 (CDT)
- Area code: 501
- GNIS feature ID: 2612123

Avilla is a census-designated place in Saline County, Arkansas, United States. Per the 2020 census, the population was 1,325.

== Demographics ==
Historical population
| Census | Pop. | Note | %± |
|---|---|---|---|
| 2010 | 896 | | — |
| 2020 | 1,325 | | 47.9% |
U.S. Decennial Census; 2010 2020

=== Racial and ethnic composition ===
Avilla CDP, Arkansas – Racial and ethnic composition Note: the US Census treats Hispanic/Latino as an ethnic category. This table excludes Latinos from the racial categories and assigns them to a separate category. Hispanics/Latinos may be of any race.
| Race / Ethnicity (NH = Non-Hispanic) | Pop 2010 | Pop 2020 | % 2010 | % 2020 |
|---|---|---|---|---|
| White alone (NH) | 845 | 1,202 | 94.31% | 90.72% |
| Black or African American alone (NH) | 21 | 18 | 2.34% | 1.36% |
| Native American or Alaska Native alone (NH) | 4 | 6 | 0.45% | 0.45% |
| Asian alone (NH) | 4 | 5 | 0.45% | 0.38% |
| Pacific Islander alone (NH) | 0 | 2 | 0.00% | 0.15% |
| Some Other Race alone (NH) | 0 | 6 | 0.00% | 0.45% |
| Mixed Race or Multi-Racial (NH) | 11 | 58 | 1.23% | 4.38% |
| Hispanic or Latino (any race) | 11 | 28 | 1.23% | 2.11% |
| Total | 896 | 1,325 | 100.00% | 100.00% |

=== 2020 census ===
As of the 2020 census, Avilla had a population of 1,325. The median age was 38.7 years. 24.7% of residents were under the age of 18 and 14.6% of residents were 65 years of age or older. For every 100 females there were 96.3 males, and for every 100 females age 18 and over there were 94.5 males age 18 and over.

0.0% of residents lived in urban areas, while 100.0% lived in rural areas.

There were 497 households in Avilla, of which 28.6% had children under the age of 18 living in them. Of all households, 71.2% were married-couple households, 18.7% were households with a male householder and no spouse or partner present, and 8.2% were households with a female householder and no spouse or partner present. About 19.3% of all households were made up of individuals and 8.4% had someone living alone who was 65 years of age or older.

There were 521 housing units, of which 4.6% were vacant. The homeowner vacancy rate was 1.2% and the rental vacancy rate was 0.0%.
