= Travis Wood =

American baseball player (born 1987)

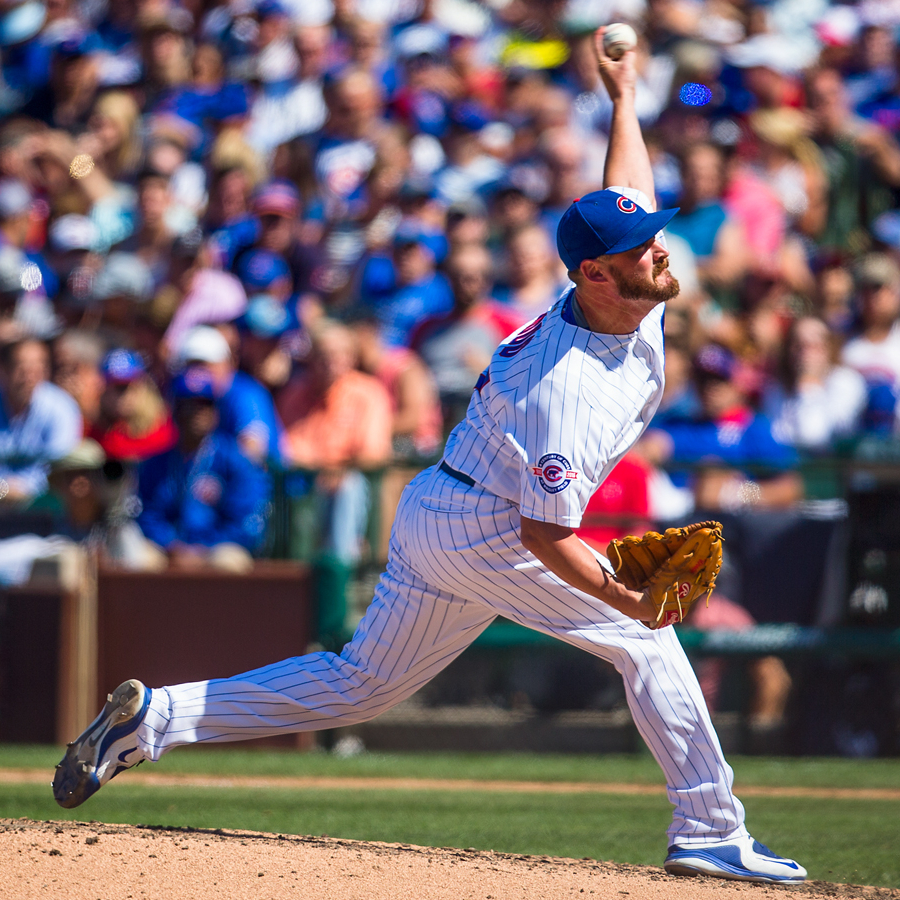
- Wood pitching with the Chicago Cubs in 2016
- Pitcher
- Born: February 6, 1987 (age 39); Little Rock, Arkansas, U.S.
- Batted: Right Threw: Left

MLB debut
- July 1, 2010, for the Cincinnati Reds

Last MLB appearance
- September 25, 2017, for the San Diego Padres

MLB statistics
- Win–loss record: 47–59
- Earned run average: 4.26
- Strikeouts: 801
- Stats at Baseball Reference

Teams
- Cincinnati Reds (2010–2011); Chicago Cubs (2012–2016); Kansas City Royals (2017); San Diego Padres (2017)

Career highlights and awards
- All-Star (2013); World Series champion (2016)

Travis Alan Wood (born February 6, 1987) is an American former professional baseball pitcher. He played in Major League Baseball (MLB) for the Cincinnati Reds, Chicago Cubs, Kansas City Royals, and San Diego Padres.

== Amateur career ==
Born and raised in Little Rock, Arkansas, Wood attended Bryant High School where he starred in baseball and football. At the Babe Ruth World Series, Wood tossed a no-hitter, striking out 17, and at Bryant, Wood received All-State honors in each of his three seasons at the school. During his junior season, Wood also led Bryant to a state championship, and was Arkansas Gatorade Player of the Year in 2004 and 2005.

== Professional career ==
=== Minor leagues ===
The Cincinnati Reds selected Wood 60th overall in the 2005 Major League Baseball draft out of Bryant High School. He chose not to attend college and went straight to professional baseball. Wood's first season as a professional was split between the Reds' Rookie Class teams, the Gulf Coast League Reds and the Billings Mustangs. He went a combined 2–0 with a 1.29 ERA in 14 games, including 11 starts. Wood held batters to a .166 batting average, struck out 67, and pitched 47 2/3 innings, including 17 2/3 scoreless over his first six appearances.

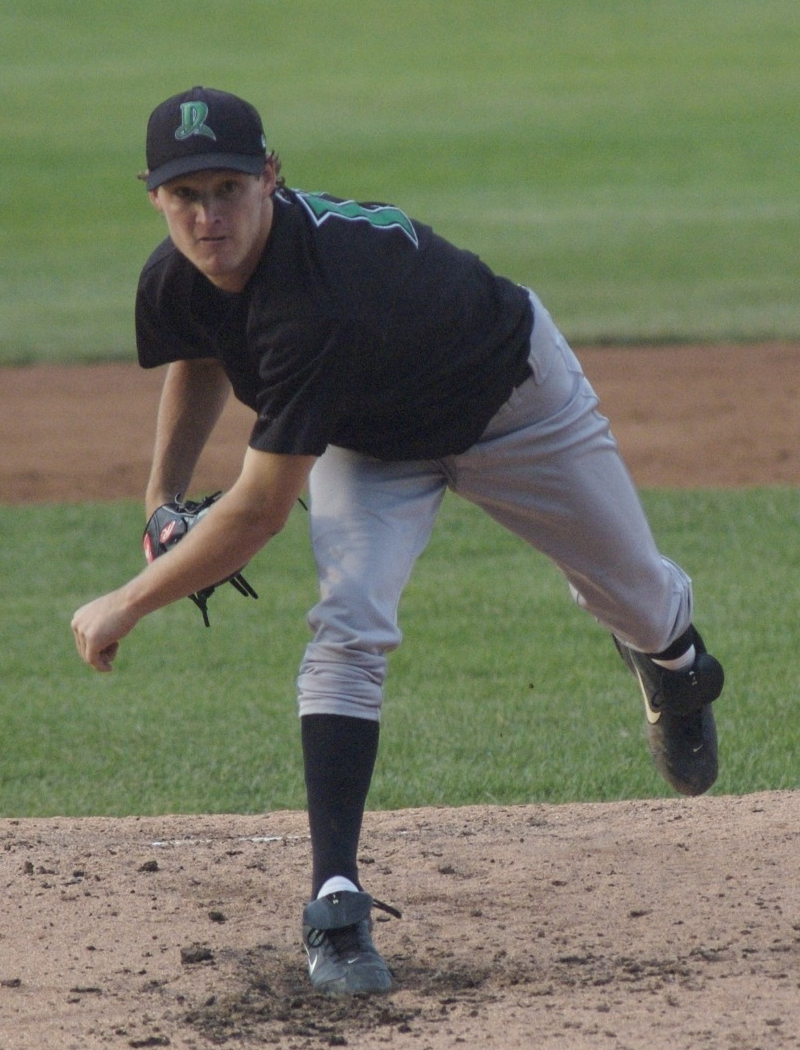
Wood pitching for the Dayton Dragons in 2006

Wood spent all of 2006 with the Class-A Dayton Dragons. He started 27 games and compiled a 10–5 record and a 3.66 ERA. Wood fanned 133 batters and held opponents to a .215 batting average. He was named Midwest League Pitcher of the Week for May 15–21, going 2–0 in 10.1 innings, striking out 13, and allowing one earned. Wood allowed only two runs in 26 innings pitched, while striking out 14 in his final four starts of the season.

Wood was placed on the disabled list on July 10 and stayed there until September 14. In 12 starts for the Sarasota Reds of the Class A-Advanced Florida State League, he went 3–2 with a 4.86 ERA. In 46.1 innings, Wood allowed 49 hits and 27 walks, striking out 54, and opponents batted .268 off him. Wood began the 2008 season in Sarasota, and went 3–4 with a 2.70 ERA in nine starts. He held batters to a .222 average while with the team. He earned Pitcher of the Week of the Florida State League for the week of 4/28-5/4, going 2–0 with a 1.38 ERA in 13 innings over the stretch, allowing two runs and striking out nine. Wood earned a promotion to the Chattanooga Lookouts of the Class AA Southern League on May 25. He struggled in 17 starts, going 4–9 with a 7.09 ERA. In 80 innings, Wood allowed 91 hits, 67 runs (63 earned), nine home runs, walked 48 and fanned 58.

Wood started the 2009 season with the Carolina Mudcats, the Reds new Southern League affiliate. That time around, he improved drastically over his previous season in Double-A. Wood pitched 119 innings over 19 starts, going 9–3 with a 1.21 ERA. Allowing just 16 earned runs on 78 hits and 37 walks, he also stuck out 103 batters and hitters batted only .189 off the lefty. Earning a call-up to the Louisville Bats of the Class AAA International League, Wood went 4–2 in 48.2 innings for the Bats. He allowed 43 hits over eight starts, walking 16 and striking out 32. The Reds added Wood to their 40-man roster after the 2009 season to protect him from the Rule 5 Draft. Wood was one of the last players cut from the Reds' roster in Spring Training, and was one of many competing for the Reds' fifth starter spot. In a crowded race featuring veterans Mike Lincoln and Justin Lehr, young arms Micah Owings and Matt Maloney, and prospects Sam LeCure, Aroldis Chapman, and Mike Leake, Wood came down to the last two but was cut in favor of Leake. He started the season in Louisville.

=== Cincinnati Reds ===
==== 2010 ====
On June 30, Wood was called up from Triple-A Louisville replacing Daniel Ray Herrera on the Reds active roster Wood made his major league debut on July 1, 2010, versus the Chicago Cubs at Wrigley Field, getting a no decision in an eventual 3–2 Reds victory.

In his third career start, versus the Philadelphia Phillies at Citizens Bank Park on July 10, 2010, Wood flirted with a perfect game, pitching eight flawless innings before surrendering a double to Phillies catcher Carlos Ruiz in the bottom of the ninth inning. Regardless, Wood actually could not have finished the perfect game in the ninth inning, because Phillies ace Roy Halladay, who himself had thrown a perfect game earlier in the 2010 season, also was pitching a shutout through nine innings. Wood exited after nine innings of one-hit ball, and the Reds would later lose the game 1–0 in 11 innings, with Ruiz scoring the winning run. Wood hit his first career home run on September 4, 2010, off St. Louis Cardinals' Adam Wainwright. Wood finished the 2010 season 5–4 with a 3.51 ERA in 17 starts.

==== 2011 ====
Wood went 6–6 with a 4.84 ERA in 22 games (18 starts) during the 2011 season.

=== Chicago Cubs ===
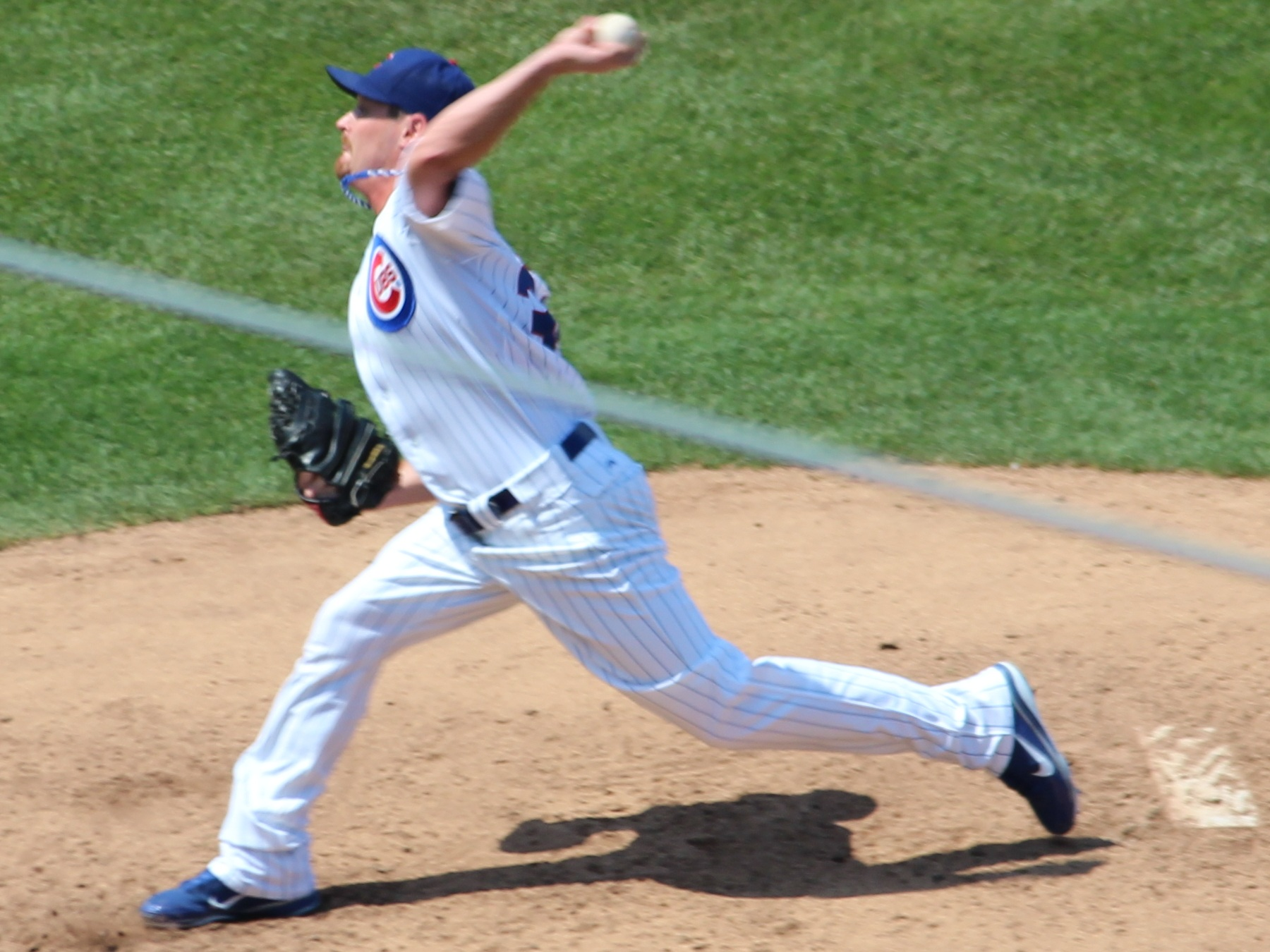
Wood pitching for the Chicago Cubs in 2012

On December 21, 2011, Wood was traded to the Chicago Cubs, along with outfielder Dave Sappelt and a minor league second baseman Ronald Torreyes in exchange for left-handed reliever Sean Marshall. Wood was called up to the major league club in early May 2012 after Chris Volstad was demoted to Iowa because of his 0–6 start. Wood went 6–13 with a 4.27 ERA in his first year as a Cub.

On May 19, 2013, Wood became the first Cub since Mordecai Brown to start a season with 9 straight quality starts. On May 30, 2013, Wood hit his first career grand slam off of Jake Peavy in an 8–3 victory over the Chicago White Sox. On July 6, 2013, Wood was named to his first All-Star selection.

In 2014, Wood hit his 9th career homerun off of St. Louis Cardinals pitcher Adam Wainwright. Wood struggled in 2014, with a 5.03 ERA in 31 starts. After struggling in the rotation to start the 2015 season, Wood was moved to the bullpen. Wood fared much better as a reliever, posting a 2.95 ERA and 4 saves in relief. Overall, he finished the season with a 3.84 ERA in 54 games (9 starts). Working out of the bullpen in 2016, Wood posted a 4–0 record with a 2.95 ERA in 77 appearances. In Game 2 of the NLDS, Wood hit a home run off of Giants' reliever George Kontos. He became the second relief pitcher to homer in a postseason game, after Rosy Ryan in Game 3 of the 1924 World Series. Wood won a World Series ring with the Cubs. He became a free agent following the 2016 season.

=== Kansas City Royals ===
On February 15, 2017, Wood signed a two-year, $12 million contract with the Kansas City Royals. The contract includes a mutual option for the 2019 season. Wood competed in spring training for a rotation spot but was ultimately moved to the bullpen to begin the season. At the beginning of July, Wood was moved to the starting rotation. Wood's overall numbers for the Royals were disappointing, sporting a career worst 6.91 ERA in 31 total appearances for the Royals.

=== San Diego Padres ===
On July 24, 2017, the Royals traded Wood, Matt Strahm, and Esteury Ruiz to the San Diego Padres for Trevor Cahill, Ryan Buchter, and Brandon Maurer. Wood was designated for assignment by the Padres on December 17, 2017, and released on December 20.

=== Detroit Tigers ===
On January 29, 2018, Wood signed a minor league contract with the Detroit Tigers. However, Wood tore his ACL in spring training and the Tigers released him on March 8.

== Pitching style ==
Wood has an expansive pitch repertoire, throwing six pitches with regularity. He has three fastballs — a four-seamer at 89–92 mph, a two-seamer at 88–91, and a cutter at 87–90. He also throws two breaking balls — a slider (80–83) and a curveball (71–75) – and, finally, a changeup at 78–81. Wood's pitches to left-handed hitters are most often four-seamers, cutters, and sliders, with an occasional curveball. To right-handers, he throws the four-seamer, two-seamer, cutter, and changeup.

== Personal life ==
Wood and his wife, Brittany, reside in Alexander, Arkansas with their daughter and son.
