= Clinton crazies =

Pejorative used in American politics

"Clinton crazies" is a pejorative term in American politics of the 1990s and later that refers to intense criticism of United States President Bill Clinton and his wife Hillary Clinton. The phrase refers to Clinton opponents who, according to Clinton supporters, "systematically ... sought to undermine this president with the goal of bringing down his presidency and running him out of office; and that they have sought non‐electoral means to remove him from office." (Note: A bibliography identifies the activities and the activists, including "individuals and organizations that have opposed Clinton. The bibliography is divided into five sections: General; 'The conspiracy stream of conspiracy commerce', a White House‐produced 'report' presenting its view of a right‐wing conspiracy against the Clinton presidency; Funding; Conservative organizations; and Publishing/media. Many of the annotations note the links among these key players.") Such intensity of feeling existed throughout the Clinton years, leading commentators to wonder what was at the root of it. The term was especially used in reference to people and media outlets that focused on all manner of Clinton scandals and controversies, some of which had substance behind them and some of which did not.

== Characterizations ==
A 1997 New York Times profile said that, "The number of influential Clinton crazies is probably no more than a hundred, but their audience is in the tens of millions."

The term was used in an extraordinary report released by the White House Counsel's office, Communication Stream of Conspiracy Commerce, which challenges persons "for spreading vicious reports about Bill Clinton that place him and some of those closest to him in criminal conspiracies." The package, containing hundreds of news clips and Internet postings, purports to show how the Clintons have been tarred by what it calls the "communication stream of conspiracy commerce." Moreover, it alleges "a close connection . . . exists between Republican elected officials and the right wing conspiracy industry." The central concept is that the traditional media are not the driving factor on these issues. "But on a central point the Administration and its enemies are in perfect agreement: because of new forms of communication – talk radio, newsletters, the Internet, mail-order videos – a significant portion of the population has developed an understanding of Bill Clinton as a debased, even criminal politician."

The "conspiracy" idea was famously resurrected by Hillary Rodham Clinton in 1998 during the Lewinsky scandal. She said there was a "vast right-wing conspiracy that has been conspiring against my husband since the day he ran for president." A month after her remark, political strategist James Carville referred to the "Clinton crazies" in terms of those who "spare no expense" in attacking President Clinton. A fact that was later reinforced by a former-conservative liberal, David Brock, who opined that the Lewinsky matter caused an alliance of traditional conservative critics with the "Clinton crazies."

The term came back into use during the 2016 United States presidential election, when Donald Trump sought to revive the 1990s era controversies. A March 2015 article in The Atlantic, written before Trump entered the race, had previously surmised that the establishment Republican strategy for the 2016 election cycle was to stick to traditional criticisms of the Democrats and to "keep the Clinton crazies muzzled."

== See also ==
- Bush derangement syndrome
- Clinton body count conspiracy theory
- Trump derangement syndrome
- Vast right-wing conspiracy
