= Shannon Hills, Arkansas =

- City
- Location of Shannon Hills in Saline County, Arkansas.
- Coordinates: 34°37′21″N 92°24′30″W
- Country: United States
- State: Arkansas
- County: Saline

Area
  - Total: 2.64 sq mi (6.84 km^{2})
  - Land: 2.64 sq mi (6.84 km^{2})
  - Water: 0 sq mi (0.00 km^{2})
- Elevation: 312 ft (95 m)

Population (2020)
  - Total: 4,490
  - Estimate (2025): 4,829 ▲
  - Density: 1,701/sq mi (656.9/km^{2})
- Time zone: UTC-6 (Central (CST))
  - Summer (DST): UTC-5 (CDT)
- ZIP code: 72103
- Area code: 501
- FIPS code: 05-63470
- GNIS feature ID: 2405448
- Website: www.shannonhills.ar.gov

Shannon Hills is a city in Saline County, Arkansas, United States. The population was 3,143 at the 2010 census, rising to 4,490 with the 2020 census. It is part of the Little Rock–North Little Rock–Conway Metropolitan Statistical Area.

== History ==
The area that would become Shannon Hills remained undeveloped until circa 1960, when housing development started. In 1977, residents voted to incorporate in part to avoid annexation into Little Rock.

== Geography ==
According to the United States Census Bureau, the city has a total area of 1.5 square miles (3.9 km^{2}), all land.

== Government ==
The city uses a city council governance model, with the council acting as the legislative and policy making body of the city. The council consists of a treasurer, recorder, and six alderman, with the mayor as a tie-breaker.

Mayor Mike Kemp has been in office since 2010, following the resignation of Lawrence Davis, who served for about 10 years until he pled guilty to not filing his taxes from the 1996–2009.

== Demographics ==
Historical population
Census	Pop.	Note	%±
1980	1,556		—
1990	1,755		12.8%
2000	2,005		14.2%
2010	3,143		56.8%
2020	4,490		42.9%
2025 (est.)	4,829	▲	7.6%
U.S. Decennial Census

=== 2020 census ===
Shannon Hills racial composition
Race	Number	Percentage
White (non-Hispanic)	2,104	46.86%
Black or African American (non-Hispanic)	1,640	36.53%
Native American	8	0.18%
Asian	51	1.14%
Pacific Islander	9	0.2%
Other/Mixed	236	5.26%
Hispanic or Latino	442	9.84%

As of the 2020 census, Shannon Hills had a population of 4,490. The median age was 32.9 years. 30.2% of residents were under the age of 18 and 8.7% were 65 years of age or older. For every 100 females, there were 89.0 males, and for every 100 females age 18 and over, there were 84.0 males.

100.0% of residents lived in urban areas, and 0.0% lived in rural areas.

There were 1,629 households in Shannon Hills, of which 45.5% had children under the age of 18 living in them. Of all households, 46.0% were married-couple households, 14.5% were households with a male householder and no spouse or partner present, and 30.6% were households with a female householder and no spouse or partner present. About 20.6% of all households were made up of individuals, and 5.4% had someone living alone who was 65 years of age or older.

There were 1,716 housing units, of which 5.1% were vacant. The homeowner vacancy rate was 1.0% and the rental vacancy rate was 11.3%.

=== 2000 census ===
As of the census of 2000, there were 2,005 people, 748 households, and 594 families residing in the city. The population density was 1,327.8 inhabitants per square mile (512.7/km^{2}). There were 784 housing units at an average density of 519.2 per square mile (200.5/km^{2}). The racial makeup of the city was 92.02% White, 3.94% Black or African American, 0.85% Native American, 0.75% Asian, 0.90% from other races, and 1.55% from two or more races. Hispanic or Latino of any race were 2.04% of the population.

There were 748 households, out of which 38.1% had children under the age of 18 living with them, 61.6% were married couples living together, 13.5% had a female householder with no husband present, and 20.5% were non-families. 16.0% of all households were made up of individuals, and 4.7% had someone living alone who was 65 years of age or older. The average household size was 2.68 and the average family size was 2.98.

In the city, the population was spread out, with 27.4% under the age of 18, 9.5% from 18 to 24, 34.1% from 25 to 44, 21.7% from 45 to 64, and 7.3% who were 65 years of age or older. The median age was 32 years. For every 100 females, there were 95.8 males. For every 100 females age 18 and over, there were 92.5 males.

The median income for a household in the city was $40,068, and the median income for a family was $43,021. Males had a median income of $31,184 versus $21,875 for females. The per capita income for the city was $16,292. About 6.7% of families and 6.6% of the population were below the poverty line, including 7.6% of those under the age of 18 and 7.0% of those 65 and older.

== Education ==
Most of Shannon Hills is in the Bryant School District, which operates Bryant High School.

A portion is in the Pulaski County Special School District, which extends into Saline County. This part is zoned to Landmark Elementary School, Mills Middle School and Wilbur D. Mills High School.
