= Arkansas Development Finance Authority =

Agency overview
- Formed: 1985
- Headquarters: 1 Commerce Wy Little Rock, Arkansas
- President responsible: Robert 'Ro' Arrington
- Parent agency: Government of Arkansas
- Website: adfa.arkansas.gov

The Arkansas Development Finance Authority (ADFA) is a state agency of Arkansas that provides financing for economic development, housing, infrastructure, and education projects. Established in 1985 under Governor Bill Clinton, ADFA was created to spur economic growth by issuing bonds and loans for public and private development initiatives. It operates as an independent political instrumentality of the State. ADFA’s programs support affordable housing, small businesses, agricultural enterprises, and capital improvements for state and local government facilities. The Authority is empowered to borrow funds and issue bonds on behalf of the state, and it serves as the exclusive issuer of bonds for Arkansas state agencies. All of ADFA’s programs align with its mission “to promote economic growth in the state of Arkansas”.

== History ==
ADFA was established by an act of the Arkansas General Assembly in 1985, during Bill Clinton’s second term as governor. It succeeded the Arkansas Housing Development Agency (created in 1977) as the state’s primary vehicle for development financing. Governor Clinton championed the creation of ADFA as part of his economic development agenda, aiming to provide low-interest financing for business growth and housing. The Authority was designed to issue bonds (often tax-exempt) and use the proceeds for loans in areas such as industrial development, housing, and agriculture. Clinton, as governor, had influence over ADFA through appointments and oversight powers – he appointed members of its board and its leadership, and by law he could approve or veto ADFA bond issues. In 1989, Clinton named Bob Nash as president of ADFA, placing him in charge of the agency’s operations. Nash led the Authority from 1989 until 1993, when he joined President Clinton’s federal administration.

During the late 1980s and early 1990s, ADFA’s financial activities drew scrutiny and became the subject of controversy. In 1992, a Los Angeles Times investigation reported that many businesses, bankers, and law firms that benefited from ADFA’s loans and bond underwriting later made substantial contributions to Clinton’s political campaigns. For example, by 1990 about one-fifth of Clinton’s gubernatorial campaign funds came from people or companies involved in ADFA projects. Critics charged that the agency was used as a political “piggy bank” to reward allies, though Clinton denied any wrongdoing. Additional allegations surfaced during the Whitewater investigations in 1994, when federal lawmakers questioned certain ADFA transactions. In one instance, ADFA deposited $50 million into a Cayman Islands bank in December 1988 – an unusual offshore transaction that prompted speculation about potential money laundering. Public records also showed that ADFA had steered millions of dollars in bond deals to Lasater & Company, a Little Rock brokerage owned by Dan Lasater. Lasater was a friend and fundraiser of Clinton’s who had been convicted in 1986 on cocaine distribution charges, leading to suspicions about the propriety of ADFA’s business with his firm. However, no legal action was taken against ADFA.

In the decades after its founding, ADFA expanded its scope and underwent organizational changes. The Authority continued to finance development projects across Arkansas, and it took on new roles in state financing. In 2017, the Arkansas Student Loan Authority (ASLA) was merged into ADFA, adding higher-education loans to its portfolio of programs.

== Activities ==
ADFA’s activities encompass a range of financing programs intended to stimulate economic and community development. Economic development and business finance: The Authority provides loans and bond financing to Arkansas businesses for industrial, agricultural, and commercial projects. This includes programs like industrial development bonds, loan guaranties for small businesses, and venture capital investments to encourage business expansion and job creation. ADFA can issue both tax-exempt and taxable bonds, using its statutory borrowing power to offer below-market interest rates to qualifying projects. It is empowered to support capital improvements for government entities, serving as the financing arm for major public infrastructure projects such as state agency facilities, schools, and local government needs. By law, state agencies in Arkansas must utilize ADFA for bond issuance, making it a key instrument for public finance in the state.

One of ADFA’s primary focuses is funding affordable housing development. The Authority administers federal and state housing programs that benefit low- and moderate-income Arkansans. After absorbing the Arkansas Student Loan Authority, ADFA now oversees programs related to higher education financing. It offers student loan programs and college funding resources intended to make post-secondary education more accessible. Additionally, ADFA supports agricultural businesses and rural development projects by extending credit and guarantees to farm enterprises, reflecting Arkansas’s agrarian economic base.

== Leadership ==
ADFA is governed by a board of directors and managed by its executive leadership. The board of directors oversees the Authority’s policies and approves major financing decisions. By statute, the board is composed of 13 members: the Arkansas State Treasurer and the Director of the Department of Finance and Administration serve as ex officio members, and eleven public members are appointed by the Governor. The day-to-day operations of ADFA are led by a President, who acts as the chief executive of the Authority. The ADFA President is a non-voting ex officio member of the board and is typically selected by the board with the approval of the Governor.

As of 2021, Mark Conine serves as the President of the Arkansas Development Finance Authority. Conine was chosen by the board in May 2021 to succeed Bryan Scoggins, who had led the agency since 2019. Prior to becoming President, Conine was ADFA’s chief financial officer and had been involved in Arkansas’s public finance sector for over a decade.
