= Alexander, Arkansas =

- City
- Seal
- Motto: "On Track for a Better Tomorrow"
- Location of Alexander in Pulaski County and Saline County, Arkansas.
- Coordinates: 34°37′33″N 92°26′49″W
- Country: United States
- State: Arkansas
- Counties: Pulaski, Saline

Area
  - Total: 2.26 sq mi (5.85 km^{2})
  - Land: 2.26 sq mi (5.85 km^{2})
  - Water: 0 sq mi (0.00 km^{2})
- Elevation: 335 ft (102 m)

Population (2020)
  - Total: 3,385
  - Estimate (2025): 3,801 ▲
  - Density: 1,499.1/sq mi (578.82/km^{2})
- Time zone: UTC-6 (Central (CST))
  - Summer (DST): UTC-5 (CDT)
- ZIP code: 72002
- Area code: 501
- FIPS code: 05-00580
- GNIS feature ID: 2403076
- Website: www.cityofalexander.org

Alexander is a city in Pulaski and Saline counties in the U.S. state of Arkansas. Located in Central Arkansas, the town was founded as a construction camp for the nearby railroad. Following its completion, the citizens decided to incorporate in 1887. Alexander is home to the Arkansas Juvenile Assessment and Treatment Center. As of the 2020 census, Alexander had a population of 3,385.

== Geography ==
According to the United States Census Bureau, the town has a total area of 2.2 square miles (5.7 km^{2}), all land.

== Demographics ==
Historical population
Census	Pop.	Note	%±
2010	2,901		—
2020	3,385		16.7%
2025 (est.)	3,801	▲	12.3%
U.S. Decennial Census

=== Racial and ethnic composition ===
Alexander city, Arkansas – Racial and ethnic composition Note: the US Census treats Hispanic/Latino as an ethnic category. This table excludes Latinos from the racial categories and assigns them to a separate category. Hispanics/Latinos may be of any race.
Race / Ethnicity (NH = Non-Hispanic)	Pop 2000	Pop 2010	Pop 2020	% 2000	% 2010	% 2020
White alone (NH)	422	1,875	1,230	68.73%	64.63%	36.34%
Black or African American alone (NH)	164	372	687	26.71%	12.82%	20.30%
Native American or Alaska Native alone (NH)	3	17	14	0.49%	0.59%	0.41%
Asian alone (NH)	6	16	28	0.98%	0.55%	0.83%
Native Hawaiian or Pacific Islander alone (NH)	0	0	0	0.00%	0.00%	0.00%
Other race alone (NH)	0	3	10	0.00%	0.10%	0.30%
Mixed race or Multiracial (NH)	5	55	144	0.81%	1.90%	4.25%
Hispanic or Latino (any race)	14	563	1,272	2.28%	19.41%	37.58%
Total	614	2,901	3,385	100.00%	100.00%	100.00%

=== 2020 census ===
As of the 2020 census, Alexander had a population of 3,385. The median age was 31.0 years. 31.4% of residents were under the age of 18 and 7.9% of residents were 65 years of age or older. For every 100 females there were 96.6 males, and for every 100 females age 18 and over there were 94.4 males age 18 and over.

98.2% of residents lived in urban areas, while 1.8% lived in rural areas.

There were 1,185 households in Alexander, including 725 families. Of those households, 45.7% had children under the age of 18 living in them. Of all households, 43.0% were married-couple households, 19.7% were households with a male householder and no spouse or partner present, and 27.3% were households with a female householder and no spouse or partner present. About 21.6% of all households were made up of individuals and 8.1% had someone living alone who was 65 years of age or older.

There were 1,267 housing units, of which 6.5% were vacant. The homeowner vacancy rate was 0.6% and the rental vacancy rate was 5.9%.

=== 2000 census ===
As of the 2000 census, there were 614 people, 276 households, and 171 families in the town. The population density was 526.8/km^{2} (1,369.5/mi^{2}). There were 305 housing units at an average density of 261.7/km^{2} (680.3/mi^{2}). The racial makeup of the town was 70.68% White, 26.71% Black or African American, 0.49% Native American, 0.98% Asian, 0.33% from other races, and 0.81% from two or more races. 2.28% of the population were Hispanic or Latino of any race.

Of the 276 households 29.3% had children under the age of 18 living with them, 39.1% were married couples living together, 17.4% had a female householder with no husband present, and 38.0% were non-families. 32.6% of households were one person and 6.5% were one person aged 65 or older. The average household size was 2.22 and the average family size was 2.79.

The age distribution was 24.8% under the age of 18, 8.6% from 18 to 24, 33.1% from 25 to 44, 22.6% from 45 to 64, and 10.9% 65 or older. The median age was 33 years. For every 100 females, there were 88.3 males. For every 100 females age 18 and over, there were 75.7 males.

The median household income was $30,050 and the median family income was $35,341. Males had a median income of $28,571 versus $21,958 for females. The per capita income for the town was $15,157. About 9.5% of families and 12.8% of the population were below the poverty line, including 9.1% of those under age 18 and 11.0% of those age 65 or over.

== Education ==
The Saline County portion is in the Bryant School District, which operates Bryant High School.

The Pulaski County portion is in the Pulaski County Special School District. It is zoned to Lawson Elementary School, Joe T. Robinson Middle School, and Joe T. Robinson High School.
