= Saline County, Arkansas =

County in Arkansas, United States

- County
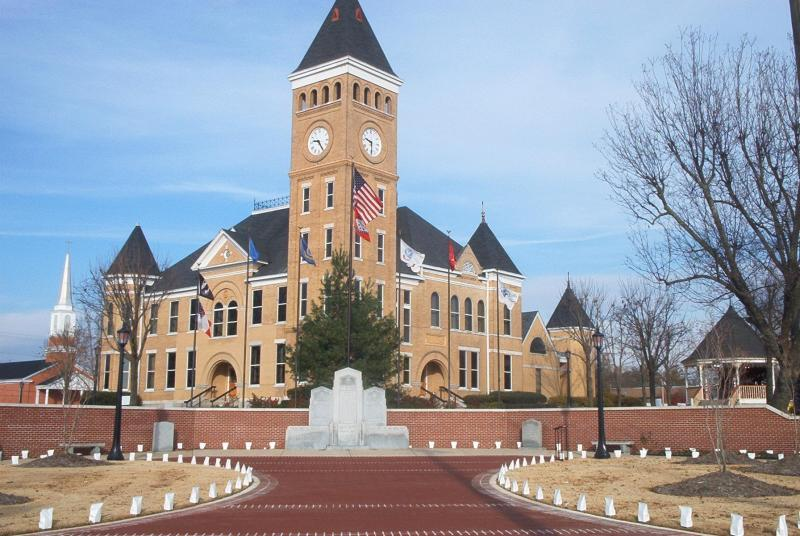
- Saline County Courthouse in Benton

- Location within the U.S. state of Arkansas
- Coordinates: 34°39′04″N 92°40′54″W
- Country: United States
- State: Arkansas
- Founded: November 2, 1835
- Seat: Benton
- Largest city: Benton

Area
  - Total: 730 sq mi (1,900 km^{2})
  - Land: 724 sq mi (1,880 km^{2})
  - Water: 6.9 sq mi (18 km^{2}) 0.9%

Population (2020)
  - Total: 123,416
  - Estimate (2025): 133,288 ▲
  - Density: 170/sq mi (65.8/km^{2})
- Time zone: UTC−6 (Central)
  - Summer (DST): UTC−5 (CDT)
- Congressional district: 2nd
- Website: www.salinecounty.org

Saline County (/səˈliːn/ sə-LEEN) is a county located in the U.S. state of Arkansas. As of the 2020 census, the population was 123,416. Its county seat and largest city is Benton. Saline County was formed on November 2, 1835, and named for the salt water (brine) springs in the area, despite a differing pronunciation from saline. Until November 2014, it was an alcohol prohibition or dry county.

Saline County is included in the Central Arkansas region.

== Geography ==
According to the U.S. Census Bureau, the county has a total area of 730 square miles (1,900 km^{2}), of which 724 square miles (1,880 km^{2}) is land and 6.9 square miles (18 km^{2}) (0.9%) is water.

=== Major highways ===
- Interstate 30
  - Interstate 30 Business Loop
- Interstate 530 / U.S. Highway 65
- U.S. Highway 67
- U.S. Highway 70
- U.S. Highway 167
- Highway 5
- Highway 9
- Highway 35
- Highway 88
- Highway 111
- Highway 128
- Highway 183
- Highway 229
- Highway 298
- Highway 367

=== Adjacent counties ===
- Perry County (northwest)
- Pulaski County (northeast)
- Grant County (southeast)
- Hot Spring County (southwest)
- Garland County (west)

=== National protected area ===
- Ouachita National Forest (part)

== Demographics ==
Historical population
Census	Pop.	Note	%±
1840	2,061		—
1850	3,903		89.4%
1860	6,640		70.1%
1870	3,911		−41.1%
1880	8,953		128.9%
1890	11,311		26.3%
1900	13,122		16.0%
1910	16,657		26.9%
1920	16,781		0.7%
1930	15,660		−6.7%
1940	19,163		22.4%
1950	23,816		24.3%
1960	28,956		21.6%
1970	36,107		24.7%
1980	53,161		47.2%
1990	64,183		20.7%
2000	83,529		30.1%
2010	107,118		28.2%
2020	123,416		15.2%
2025 (est.)	133,288	▲	8.0%
U.S. Decennial Census; 1790–1960 1900–1990; 1990–2000 2010

=== 2020 census ===
As of the 2020 census, the county had a population of 123,416. The median age was 40.0 years. 24.0% of residents were under the age of 18 and 18.4% of residents were 65 years of age or older. For every 100 females there were 95.2 males, and for every 100 females age 18 and over there were 92.6 males age 18 and over.

The racial makeup of the county was 79.7% White, 8.4% Black or African American, 0.7% American Indian and Alaska Native, 1.2% Asian, 0.1% Native Hawaiian and Pacific Islander, 3.5% from some other race, and 6.5% from two or more races. Hispanic or Latino residents of any race comprised 6.9% of the population.

63.2% of residents lived in urban areas, while 36.8% lived in rural areas.

There were 48,232 households in the county, of which 32.9% had children under the age of 18 living in them. Of all households, 54.4% were married-couple households, 15.6% were households with a male householder and no spouse or partner present, and 24.5% were households with a female householder and no spouse or partner present. About 23.7% of all households were made up of individuals and 10.1% had someone living alone who was 65 years of age or older.

There were 51,879 housing units, of which 7.0% were vacant. Among occupied housing units, 76.2% were owner-occupied and 23.8% were renter-occupied. The homeowner vacancy rate was 1.6% and the rental vacancy rate was 8.0%.

=== 2000 census ===
As of the 2000 United States census, there were 83,529 people, 31,778 households, and 24,500 families residing in the county. The population density was 116 inhabitants per square mile (45/km^{2}). There were 33,825 housing units at an average density of 47 per square mile (18/km^{2}). The racial makeup of the county was 95.27% White, 2.20% Black or African American, 0.49% Native American, 0.57% Asian, 0.03% Pacific Islander, 0.45% from other races, and 1.00% from two or more races. 1.30% of the population were Hispanic or Latino of any race.

There were 31,778 households, out of which 35.40% had children under the age of 18 living with them, 63.80% were married couples living together, 9.70% had a female householder with no husband present, and 22.90% were non-families. 19.60% of all households were made up of individuals, and 7.50% had someone living alone who was 65 years of age or older. The average household size was 2.57 and the average family size was 2.94.

In the county, the population was spread out, with 25.50% under the age of 18, 7.70% from 18 to 24, 30.20% from 25 to 44, 24.20% from 45 to 64, and 12.50% who were 65 years of age or older. The median age was 37 years. For every 100 females, there were 98.10 males. For every 100 females age 18 and over, there were 95.30 males.

The median income for a household in the county was $42,569, and the median income for a family was $48,717. Males had a median income of $32,052 versus $23,294 for females. The per capita income for the county was $19,214. About 5.00% of families and 7.20% of the population were below the poverty line, including 8.80% of those under age 18 and 7.30% of those age 65 or over.

== Media ==
The area is served online and in print by The Saline Courier.

== Government and politics ==
=== Government ===
The county government is a constitutional body granted specific powers by the Constitution of Arkansas and the Arkansas Code. The quorum court is the legislative branch of the county government and controls all spending and revenue collection. Representatives are called justices of the peace and are elected from county districts every even-numbered year. The number of districts in a county vary from nine to fifteen, and district boundaries are drawn by the county election commission. The Saline County Quorum Court has thirteen members. Presiding over quorum court meetings is the county judge, who serves as the chief executive officer of the county. The county judge is elected at-large and does not vote in quorum court business, although capable of vetoing quorum court decisions.

Saline County, Arkansas Elected countywide officials
Position	Officeholder	Party
County Judge	Matthew Brumley	Republican
County Clerk	Doug Curtis	Republican
Circuit Clerk	Myka Bono Sample	Republican
Sheriff	Rodney Wright	Republican
Treasurer	Holly Payne	Republican
Collector	Jennifer Carter	Republican
Assessor	Pam Wright	Republican
Coroner	Kevin Cleghorn	Republican
Surveyor	Aaron Rasburry	Republican

The composition of the Quorum Court following the 2024 elections is 13 Republicans. Justices of the Peace (members) of the Quorum Court following the elections are:

- District 1: Pat Bisbee (R)
- District 2: Wilson Hatcher (R)
- District 3: Carlton Billingsley (R)
- District 4: Keith Kellum (R)
- District 5: Justin Rue (R)
- District 6: Rick Bellinger (R)
- District 7: Josh Curtis (R)
- District 8: Edward A. Albares (R)
- District 9: CJ Engel (R)
- District 10: Jim Whitley (R)
- District 11: Clint Chism (R)
- District 12: Stephanie Johnson (R)
- District 13: Karen Crowson (R)

Additionally, the townships of Saline County are entitled to elect their own respective constables, as set forth by the Constitution of Arkansas. Constables are largely of historical significance as they were used to keep the peace in rural areas when travel was more difficult. The township constables as of the 2024 elections are:

- District 1: Clint Newcomb (R)
- District 2: Bobby Hahn (R)

=== Politics ===
Over the past few election cycles Saline County has trended heavily towards the GOP. The last Democrat (as of the 2024 election) to carry this county was Bill Clinton in 1996. In 2024, it was the only county in Arkansas to swing towards Kamala Harris.

United States presidential election results for Saline County, Arkansas
Year	Republican		Democratic		Third party(ies)	
Year	No.	%	No.	%	No.	%
1892	326	20.84%	1,161	74.23%	77	4.92%
1896	268	15.89%	1,417	84.00%	2	0.12%
1900	342	29.01%	811	68.79%	26	2.21%
1904	391	38.04%	588	57.20%	49	4.77%
1908	369	27.48%	899	66.94%	75	5.58%
1912	164	13.86%	814	68.81%	205	17.33%
1916	231	12.85%	1,567	87.15%	0	0.00%
1920	403	24.13%	1,206	72.22%	61	3.65%
1924	144	13.65%	770	72.99%	141	13.36%
1928	520	29.12%	1,261	70.60%	5	0.28%
1932	107	5.03%	1,990	93.47%	32	1.50%
1936	359	18.86%	1,520	79.87%	24	1.26%
1940	274	12.17%	1,963	87.21%	14	0.62%
1944	643	19.99%	2,556	79.45%	18	0.56%
1948	390	13.60%	2,070	72.18%	408	14.23%
1952	1,766	30.12%	4,045	68.99%	52	0.89%
1956	2,603	40.81%	3,705	58.09%	70	1.10%
1960	2,195	32.32%	3,898	57.40%	698	10.28%
1964	3,628	38.96%	5,605	60.18%	80	0.86%
1968	2,614	23.15%	3,111	27.55%	5,569	49.31%
1972	7,972	63.64%	4,503	35.95%	52	0.42%
1976	4,123	25.55%	12,008	74.41%	7	0.04%
1980	8,330	42.60%	10,368	53.02%	857	4.38%
1984	11,709	60.68%	6,977	36.16%	611	3.17%
1988	12,353	58.89%	8,436	40.22%	188	0.90%
1992	10,105	39.38%	12,671	49.38%	2,885	11.24%
1996	11,695	40.77%	14,027	48.90%	2,963	10.33%
2000	18,617	57.48%	12,700	39.21%	1,074	3.32%
2004	24,864	63.15%	14,153	35.94%	359	0.91%
2008	30,981	69.38%	12,695	28.43%	977	2.19%
2012	32,963	70.04%	12,869	27.34%	1,230	2.61%
2016	35,863	68.83%	13,256	25.44%	2,981	5.72%
2020	39,556	69.45%	16,060	28.20%	1,343	2.36%
2024	39,736	68.98%	16,609	28.83%	1,264	2.19%

== Communities ==
=== Cities ===
- Alexander
- Benton (county seat)
- Bryant
- Haskell
- Shannon Hills
- Traskwood

=== Town ===
- Bauxite

=== Census-designated places ===
- Avilla
- East End
- Hot Springs Village
- Salem
- Sardis

=== Unincorporated communities ===
- Brooks
- Lakeside
- Owensville
- Paron

=== Townships ===
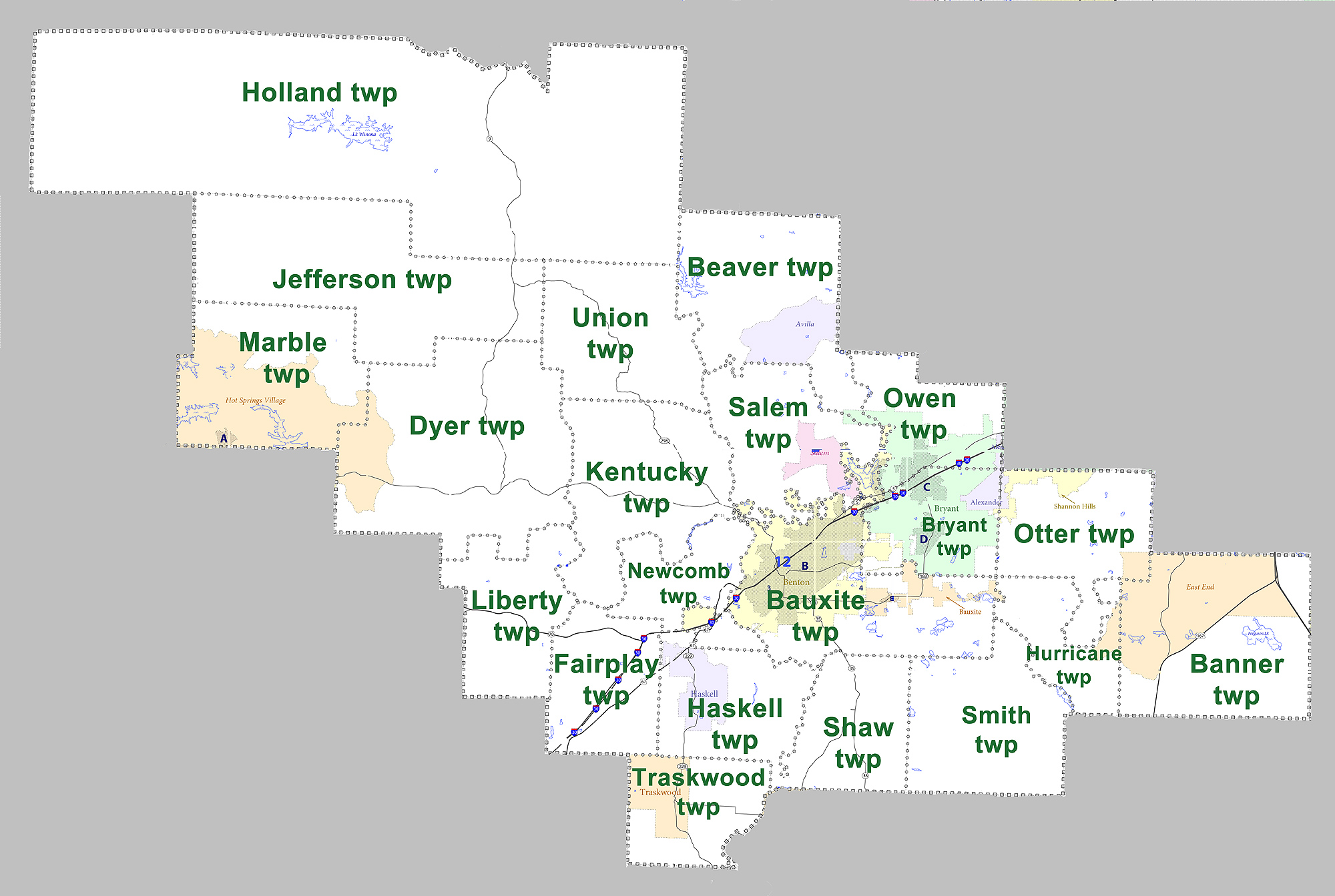
Townships in Saline County, Arkansas as of 2010

Townships in Arkansas are the divisions of a county. Each township includes unincorporated areas; some may have incorporated cities or towns within part of their boundaries. Arkansas townships have limited purposes in modern times. However, the United States census does list Arkansas population based on townships (sometimes referred to as "county subdivisions" or "minor civil divisions"). Townships are also of value for historical purposes in terms of genealogical research. Each town or city is within one or more townships in an Arkansas county based on census maps and publications. The townships of Saline County are listed below; listed in parentheses are the cities, towns, and/or census-designated places that are fully or partially inside the township.

- Banner (contains most of East End)
- Bauxite (contains Bauxite, most of Benton)
- Beaver (contains Avilla, part of Bryant)
- Bryant (contains most of Alexander and Bryant, small parts of Benton and Shannon Hills)
- Dyer (contains part of Hot Springs Village)
- Fairplay
- Haskell (contains Haskell)
- Holland
- Hurricane (contains small part of East End)
- Jefferson
- Kentucky
- Liberty
- Marble (contains part of Hot Springs Village)
- Newcomb
- Otter (contains most of Shannon Hills, small parts of Alexander and East End)
- Owen (contains some of Bryant, small part of Alexander)
- Salem (contains Salem, small part of Bryant)
- Shaw
- Smith
- Traskwood (contains Traskwood)
- Union

== Education ==
School districts include:

- Bauxite School District
- Benton School District
- Bryant Public Schools
- Fountain Lake School District
- Glen Rose School District
- Harmony Grove School District
- Jessieville School District
- Pulaski County Special School District
- Sheridan School District

Former school districts:

- Paron School District - On July 1, 2004, the Paron School District merged into the Bryant School District.

== See also ==
- List of lakes in Saline County, Arkansas
- National Register of Historic Places listings in Saline County, Arkansas
- Lanny Fite
