= Mena Intermountain Municipal Airport =

Airport in Arkansas, United States

- IATA: UMZ; ICAO: KMEZ; FAA LID: MEZ

Summary
- Airport type: Public
- Owner: City of Mena
- Serves: Mena, Arkansas
- Elevation AMSL: 1,080 ft (330 m)
- Coordinates: 34°32′43″N 094°12′10″W
- Website: www.menaairport.com

Map
- Location of airport in Arkansas UMZ/KMEZ/MEZ (the United States)

Runways
Direction	Length		Surface
Direction	ft	m	Surface
9/27	5,485	1,672	Asphalt
17/35	5,001	1,524	Asphalt

Statistics (2020)
- Aircraft operations (year ending 1/31/2020): 31,000
- Based aircraft: 23
- Source: Federal Aviation Administration

Mena Intermountain Municipal Airport (IATA: UMZ, ICAO: KMEZ, FAA LID: MEZ) is a city-owned, public-use airport located 2 nmi (3.7 km) southeast of the central business district of Mena, a city in Polk County, Arkansas, United States. It is included in the National Plan of Integrated Airport Systems for 2011–2015, which categorized it as a general aviation facility.

Although most U.S. airports use the same three-letter location identifier for the FAA and IATA, Mena Intermountain Municipal Airport is assigned MEZ by the FAA and UMZ by the IATA (which assigned MEZ to Messina, South Africa). The airport's ICAO identifier is KMEZ.

== Facilities and aircraft ==
Mena Intermountain Municipal Airport covers an area of 667 acres (270 ha) at an elevation of 1,080 feet (329 m) above mean sea level. It has two runways with asphalt surfaces: 9/27 is 5,485 by 100 feet (1,672 x 30 m) and 17/35 is 5,001 by 75 feet (1,524 x 23 m).

For the 12-month period ending January 31, 2020, the airport had 31,000 aircraft operations, an average of 85 per day: 93% general aviation, 5% air taxi, and 2% military. At that time there were 23 aircraft based at this airport: 16 single-engine, 5 multi-engine, 1 jet, and 1 helicopter.

== Allegations of CIA drug trafficking ==
A number of allegations have been made about the use of Mena Intermountain Municipal Airport as a CIA drop point in large scale cocaine trafficking, beginning in the latter part of the 1980s. Several local, state, and federal investigations have taken place in relation to these allegations. The topic has received some press coverage that has included allegations of awareness, participation and/or coverup involving prominent figures such as Reagan administration officials, then governor Bill Clinton and Saline County prosecutor Dan Harmon (who was convicted of numerous felonies including drug and racketeering charges in 1997).

Attempts were made to investigate by both state and federal level law enforcement, however these efforts were frustrated.

An investigation by the CIA's inspector general concluded that the CIA had no involvement in or knowledge of any illegal activities that may have occurred in Mena. The report said that the agency had conducted a training exercise at the airport in partnership with another federal agency and that companies located at the airport had performed "routine aviation-related services on equipment owned by the CIA".

== See also ==
- List of airports in Arkansas
