= National Register of Historic Places listings in Saline County, Arkansas =

Location of Saline County in Arkansas

This is a list of the National Register of Historic Places listings in Saline County, Arkansas.

This is intended to be a complete list of the properties and districts on the National Register of Historic Places in Saline County, Arkansas, United States. The locations of National Register properties and districts for which the latitude and longitude coordinates are included below, may be seen in a map.

There are 22 properties and districts listed on the National Register in the county. One other site was once listed on the Register but have been removed.

Contents: Counties in Arkansas
- Arkansas
- Ashley
- Baxter
- Benton
- Boone
- Bradley
- Calhoun
- Carroll
- Chicot
- Clark
- Clay
- Cleburne
- Cleveland
- Columbia
- Conway
- Craighead
- Crawford
- Crittenden
- Cross
- Dallas
- Desha
- Drew
- Faulkner
- Franklin
- Fulton
- Garland
- Grant
- Greene
- Hempstead
- Hot Spring
- Howard
- Independence
- Izard
- Jackson
- Jefferson
- Johnson
- Lafayette
- Lawrence
- Lee
- Lincoln
- Little River
- Logan
- Lonoke
- Madison
- Marion
- Miller
- Mississippi
- Monroe
- Montgomery
- Nevada
- Newton
- Ouachita
- Perry
- Phillips
- Pike
- Poinsett
- Polk
- Pope
- Prairie
- Pulaski (Little Rock)
- Randolph
- St. Francis
- Saline
- Scott
- Searcy
- Sebastian
- Sevier
- Sharp
- Stone
- Union
- Van Buren
- Washington
- White
- Woodruff
- Yell

This National Park Service list is complete through NPS recent listings posted May 22, 2026.

== Current listings ==
	Name on the Register	Image	Date listed	Location	City or town	Description
1	Alum Fork Reservoir	Alum Fork Reservoir	May 22, 2026 (#100013024)	24577 Lake Winona Road; 34°47′42″N 92°50′39″W	Paron	AKA Lake Winona
2	Bennett House	Bennett House	January 21, 2020 (#100004906)	503 First St. 34°33′34″N 92°35′00″W	Benton	
3	Benton Commercial Historic District	Benton Commercial Historic District	July 24, 2008 (#08000706)	Portions of the 100 and 200 blocks of N. Main, N. Market, N. East, W. South, and Sevier Sts. 34°33′52″N 92°35′13″W	Benton	
4	Dr. T.E. Buffington House	Dr. T.E. Buffington House	October 1, 2014 (#14000250)	312 W. South St. 34°33′49″N 92°35′22″W	Benton	
5	J.W. and Ann Lowe Clary House	J.W. and Ann Lowe Clary House	February 19, 1993 (#93000053)	305 N. East St. 34°33′56″N 92°35′06″W	Benton	
6	Gann Row Historic District	Gann Row Historic District	February 5, 1999 (#99000106)	Bounded by Pine, Market, Maple and S. Main Sts. 34°33′35″N 92°35′15″W	Benton	Thirteen Craftsman-style or "Folk Victorian"-style homes for middle-class population.
7	Gann Building	Gann Building	October 21, 1975 (#75000415)	218 S. Market St. 34°33′41″N 92°35′16″W	Benton	
8	Gann House	Gann House	January 2, 1976 (#76000464)	224 S. Market St. 34°33′42″N 92°35′16″W	Benton	now the Gann Museum of Saline County
9	Hester-Lenz House	Hester-Lenz House	February 11, 2004 (#04000002)	905 Highway 5, N. 34°36′18″N 92°32′42″W	Benton	
10	Hughes Mound Site (3SA11)		October 10, 1985 (#85003134)	Address Restricted	Benton	
11	Andrew Hunter House	Andrew Hunter House	December 12, 1976 (#76000466)	West of Bryant on Highway 5; 34°37′37″N 92°29′53″W	Bryant	Also known as Hunter-Dearborn House
12	Charles "Bullet" Dean Hyten House	Charles "Bullet" Dean Hyten House	September 24, 2012 (#12000804)	211 Main St. 34°33′44″N 92°35′13″W	Benton	Home of Arts & Crafts movement artist of Niloak Art Pottery
13	Independent Order of Odd Fellows Building	Independent Order of Odd Fellows Building	May 26, 2004 (#04000509)	123-125 N. Market; 34°33′58″N 92°35′16″W	Benton	
14	International Harvester Servicenter		November 23, 2020 (#100005591)	1124 Military Rd. 34°34′28″N 92°34′47″W	Benton	
15	Old Benton-Sardis Road Bridge	Old Benton-Sardis Road Bridge	January 24, 2007 (#06001274)	North of Highway 183, approximately 1.25 miles (2.01 km) east of Pine Haven Rd. 34°33′39″N 92°30′11″W	Bauxite	part of the Historic Bridges of Arkansas Multiple Property Submission (MPS)
16	Old River Bridge	Old River Bridge	September 15, 1977 (#77000277)	Southwest of Benton at River Rd. and the Saline River; 34°32′26″N 92°36′25″W	Benton	
17	Pleasant Hill Methodist Church	Pleasant Hill Methodist Church	June 5, 1991 (#91000684)	Junction of Lawson and Lake Norrell Rds. 34°41′47″N 92°36′56″W	Pleasant Hill	
18	Royal Theatre	Royal Theatre	September 27, 2003 (#03000955)	111 S. Market St. 34°43′47″N 92°35′18″W	Benton	
19	Rucker House	Rucker House	June 16, 1988 (#88000744)	Benton and School Sts. 34°33′21″N 92°30′37″W	Bauxite	
20	Saline County Courthouse	Saline County Courthouse	November 22, 1976 (#76000465)	Courthouse Sq. 34°33′53″N 92°35′15″W	Benton	
21	Shoppach House	Shoppach House	October 10, 1975 (#75000416)	508 N. Main St. 34°34′09″N 92°35′23″W	Benton	
22	Dr. James Wyatt Walton House	Dr. James Wyatt Walton House	December 22, 1977 (#77000276)	301 W. Sevier; 34°33′52″N 92°35′24″W	Benton	

== Former listings ==
	Name on the Register	Image	Date listed	Date removed	Location	City or town	Description
1	Missouri-Pacific Railroad Depot		June 11, 1992 (#92000602)	September 17, 1999	Adjacent to jct. of S. East and E. Hazel Sts.	Benton	
2	North Fork Saline River Bridge		May 26, 1995 (#95000642)	September 23, 2011	Highway 9 over the Saline River; 34°46′47″N 92°45′28″W	Paron	Historic Bridges of Arkansas MPS
3	Saline River Bridge	Saline River Bridge	April 9, 1990 (#90000529)	January 14, 2002	County Highway 365, over the Saline River	Benton	Historic Bridges of Arkansas MPS

== See also ==
- List of National Historic Landmarks in Arkansas
- National Register of Historic Places listings in Arkansas
