= Dewell =

Dewell is both a given name and surname of English origin. Notable people with the name include:

== Surname ==
- Billy Dewell (1917–2000), American football player
- Elizabeth Dewell (fl. 1641–1660), birth name of Elizabeth Lilburne, English Leveller
- James D. Dewell (1837–1906), American politician

== Given name ==
- Dewell Brewer (born 1970), American football player
- Dewell Gann Sr., namesake of the Gann House, Gann Building, and Gann Row Historic District in Benton, Arkansas

== In fiction ==
- Cassie Dewell, featured in several novels by author C. J. Box
