= Benton Commercial Historic District =

Historic district in Arkansas, United States

- U.S. National Register of Historic Places
- U.S. Historic district
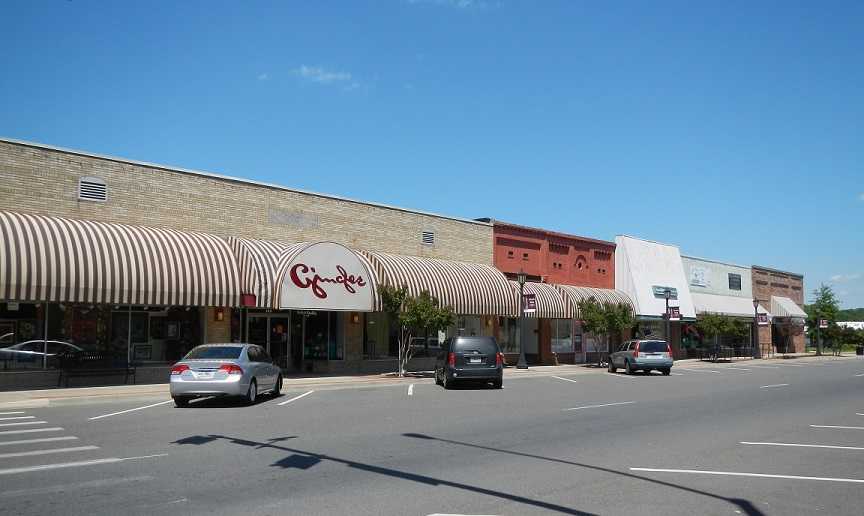

- Location within Arkansas Location within the United States
- Location: Portions of 100 and 200 blocks of N. Main, N. Market, N. East, W. South, and Sevier St., Benton, Arkansas
- Coordinates: 34.56453°N 92.5868°W
- Area: 10.8 acres (4.4 ha)
- Built: 1902
- Architect: Ginocchio, Frank; Cromwell, Edwin
- Architectural style: Italianate, Early Commercial, Art Deco
- NRHP reference No.: 08000706
- Added to NRHP: July 24, 2008

The Benton Commercial Historic District is a historic district that was listed on the National Register of Historic Places in 2008. It encompasses the core of the commercial district of Benton, Arkansas, whose major period of development took place between 1902 and 1958. The district's 53 properties reflect the growth and development of the city's businesses. It covers roughly two square blocks, bounded on the west by South Market Street, the north by West Sevier Street, the east by North East Street, and the south by River and East South Streets.

It includes three buildings that were already separately listed on the National Register: the Saline County Courthouse at 200 W. Sevier, the Independent Order of Odd Fellows Building at 123 N. Market, and the Royal Theatre at 111 S. Market.

== See also ==
- National Register of Historic Places listings in Saline County, Arkansas
