= Old Benton-Sardis Road Bridge =

- U.S. National Register of Historic Places
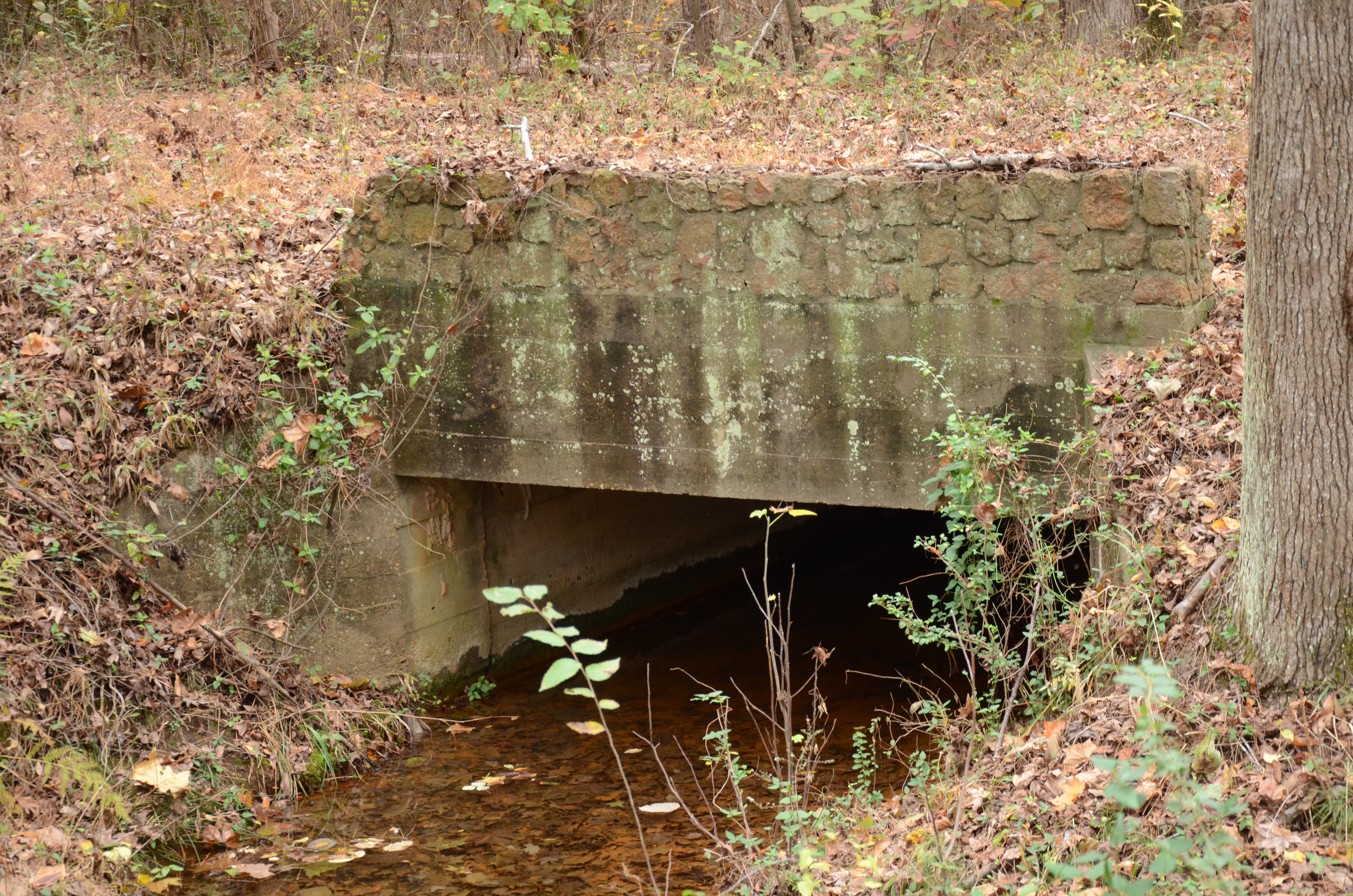

- Location within Arkansas Location within the United States
- Location: North of Highway 183 approximately 1.25 miles (2 km) east of Pine Haven Road
- Nearest city: Bauxite, Arkansas
- Coordinates: 34°33′39″N 92°30′11″W
- Built: c. 1919
- Architectural style: Concrete deck truss
- MPS: Historic Bridges of Arkansas MPS
- NRHP reference No.: 06001274
- Added to NRHP: January 24, 2007

The Old Benton—Sardis Road Bridge is a historic bridge off Arkansas Highway 183 in Bauxite, Arkansas. It is a concrete deck truss bridge, with a span of about 15 feet (4.6 m), and is oriented east–west along an old road bed, resting on concrete abutments with diagonal wing walls. The bridge was built in 1919 as part of a project to build a new road connecting Benton to Sardis, which would facilitate the transport of bauxite mined in the area. Unlike other concrete bridges built at that time, this bridge included fieldstone in its guardrails, which provided a decorative aspect as well as perhaps being inexpensive locally. The method of contracting and construction of the road and bridge, involving the establishment of a road improvement district, was an important advance in the means by which roads were built in Arkansas.

The bridge was listed on the National Register of Historic Places in 2007.

== See also ==
- National Register of Historic Places listings in Saline County, Arkansas
- List of bridges on the National Register of Historic Places in Arkansas
