= Bennett House (Benton, Arkansas) =

- U.S. National Register of Historic Places
- Location within Arkansas Location within the United States
- Location: 503 First Street, Benton, Arkansas
- Coordinates: 34.559464°N 92.583520°W
- Area: 0.35 acres (0.14 ha)
- Built: 1904
- Architectural style: Folk Victorian
- NRHP reference No.: 100004906
- Added to NRHP: January 21, 2020

The Bennett House is a two-story home located at 503 First Street, Benton, Arkansas. It was built in the Folk Victorian style in 1904, near what is today's Benton Commercial Historic District.

It was added to the National Register of Historic Places on January 21, 2020.

== History ==
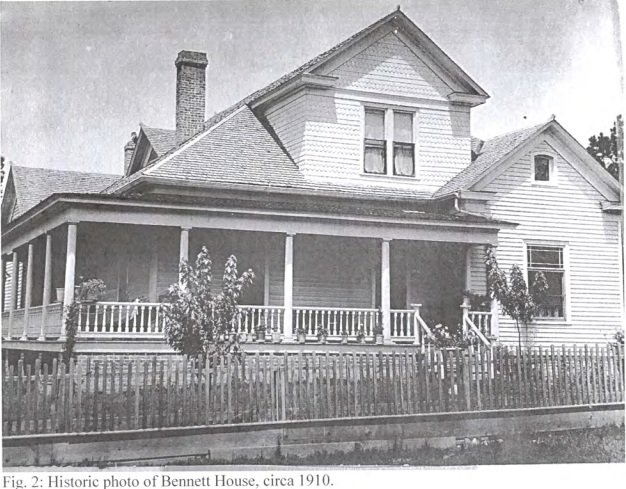
BennettHouse1910

The home was built by William Hosea Bennett in 1904. Born in Jackson County, Georgia, in 1850, Bennett left home and bought several hundred acres of land along the Saline River in what would become Saline County, Arkansas. He married his first wife, Augusta Shaw, in 1870, but was soon widowed and left to raise their infant daughter alone. He remarried in 1877, to Nancy Victoria Moore, with whom he had eight more children. Bennett was a prominent member of the budding Benton community. He served as a school director, alderman, and Justice of the Peace before being elected mayor in 1916. While serving as mayor, he founded Benton's first volunteer fire department. After retiring from public life, he continued to run his brick and floral businesses until his death in 1935. He is buried at Pinecrest Memorial Park and Mausoleum in Alexander, Arkansas.

The Bennett House is one of the oldest homes in its neighborhood according to Sanborn Fire Insurance maps. According to these maps, between 1921 and 1930, First Street was at one point named Oak Street and extended north to include Lilian Street.

== Architecture ==
Built in the mostly Folk Victorian style, the home does have some designs indicative of traditional Victorian and Queen Anne style architecture influences. The east facing front façade has an asymmetrical design featuring original stained glass panes, a covered porch with five elaborate classical-inspired columns, framed with short railings and turned wood balusters. The porch extends to the south facing façade, with the far right featuring the main entrance to the home. The exterior features a mixture of weatherboard and wood shingle siding. The interior of the home features a fireplace, exposed hardwood shiplap, and a central staircase that has largely remained untouched; however, as of 2020, the home was undergoing restoration and renovation.

== See also ==
- National Register of Historic Places listings in Saline County, Arkansas
