= Bauxite High School =

Location
- 800 School Street; Bauxite, Arkansas 72011; United States
- Coordinates: 34°33′23″N 92°30′33″W

Information
- School type: Public comprehensive
- Founded: Prior to 1920
- Status: Open
- School district: Bauxite School District
- CEEB code: 040125
- NCES School ID: 050279000047
- Teaching staff: 53.73 (on FTE basis)
- Grades: 9–12
- Enrollment: 549 (2023-2024)
- Student to teacher ratio: 10.22
- Education system: ADE Smart Core
- Classes offered: Regular (Core), Career Focus, Advanced Placement (AP)
- Campus size: 86.09 square miles (223.0 km^{2})
- Colors: Black and gray
- Athletics conference: 4A Region 7
- Mascot: Bauxite Miner
- Team name: Bauxite Miners
- Accreditation: ADE
- Communities served: Bauxite, Tull
- Affiliation: Arkansas Activities Association
- Website: www.bauxiteminers.org/o/high-school/

Bauxite High School (BHS) is a comprehensive public high school located in Bauxite, Arkansas, United States. It is one of five public high schools in Saline County and the only senior high school administered by the Bauxite School District.

The school provides secondary education in grades 9 through 12 for students encompassing 86.09 square miles (223.0 km^{2}) of land, including almost all of Bauxite, sections of Benton, Tull, and nearby Saline County and Grant County unincorporated communities.

The current high school facilities were built in 2001, replacing a Depression-era Works Progress Administration-built school that was destroyed by fire on January 5, 2001.

== Academics ==
The assumed course of study is the Smart Core curriculum developed by the Arkansas Department of Education. Students may engage in regular and Advanced Placement (AP) coursework and exams prior to graduation. Bauxite High School is accredited by ADE.

== Athletics ==
The Bauxite High School mascot and athletic emblem is the Bauxite Miner with black and gray serving as the school colors.

The Bauxite Miners compete in interscholastic activities within the 4A Classification administered by the Arkansas Activities Association. The Miners play within the 4A Region 7 Conference. The Miners participate in football, basketball (boys/girls), cheer, dance team, baseball, fastpitch softball, track and field (boys/girls).

- Football - Bauxite won their classification's 1996 state football championship.

•Fast-pitch Softball - Bauxite won the State title in fast-pitch softball for their classification in 2018 http://members.ahsaa.org/public/userfiles/Baseball.Softball/Softball_Previous_Champs.pdf.

- 2010 3A High School Baseball State Champions. Finished season with a 27-5 Record.

•Dance - Bauxite has won their classification for the State title in dance in 2012, 2013, 2014, 2015, 2016, 2017, and 2018 http://members.ahsaa.org/public/userfiles/SPIRIT/2018_Dance_Results.pdf.

•Cheer - Bauxite won their classification for the State title in coed cheer in 2015, 2019, and 2020. Due to issues with the Arkansas Activities Association scoring of the State competition for 2015, the official records of the winners for all classifications were removed from their website immediately upon announcing their error.

== Notable people ==
- Leon Campbell (1945)—NFL professional football player; inductee, Arkansas Sports Hall of Fame.
- George Cole (1923)—American football player, coach, and college athletics administrator; inductee, Arkansas Sports Hall of Fame.
- Susan Dunn (1972)—Operatic singer; award-winning spinto soprano.
