= Hester-Lenz House =

Historic house in Arkansas, United States

- U.S. National Register of Historic Places
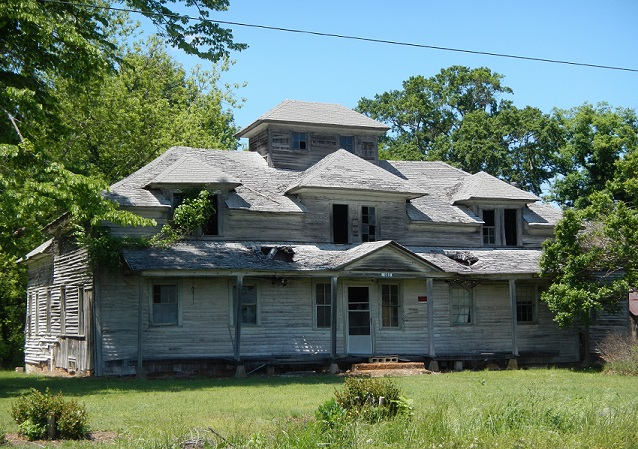

- Location within Arkansas Location within the United States
- Location: 905 AR 5 N, Benton, Arkansas
- Coordinates: 34°36′18″N 92°32′42″W
- Area: less than one acre
- Built: 1836 - 7
- Built by: Hester, James; Lenggenhager, Joseph and Salome
- Architectural style: Plain Traditional
- NRHP reference No.: 04000002
- Added to NRHP: February 11, 2004

The Hester-Lenz House is a historic house at 905 AR 5 N in Benton, Arkansas. Built in 1836 on what was then the Southwest Trail or the Military Road, it may be the oldest surviving house in Saline County that remains in its original location, and it may have been the location of a vote for independence of the state of Arkansas. The original construction, a two-story log dogtrot believed to have been built about 1836–37, was modified in the late 19th century by German immigrants with their distinctive vernacular styling.

The house was listed on the National Register of Historic Places in 2004. It has also been known as the Oscar F. Lenz House, as the Lenggenhager House.

== See also ==
- National Register of Historic Places listings in Saline County, Arkansas
