= Dwight Fite =

American politician

Member of the Arkansas House of Representatives from the 28th district
- In office January 13, 2003 – January 8, 2007
- Preceded by: Sandra Reyenga Rodgers
- Succeeded by: Lamont Cornwell

Member of the Arkansas House of Representatives from the 47th district
- In office January 8, 2001 – January 13, 2003
- Preceded by: Douglas Kidd
- Succeeded by: Preston Scroggin

Personal details
- Born: October 8, 1943 (age 81); Bauxite, Arkansas
- Political party: Democratic

Dwight Fite (born October 8, 1943) is an American politician who served in the Arkansas House of Representatives from 2001 to 2007.
