= Shoppach House =

Historic house in Arkansas, United States

- U.S. National Register of Historic Places
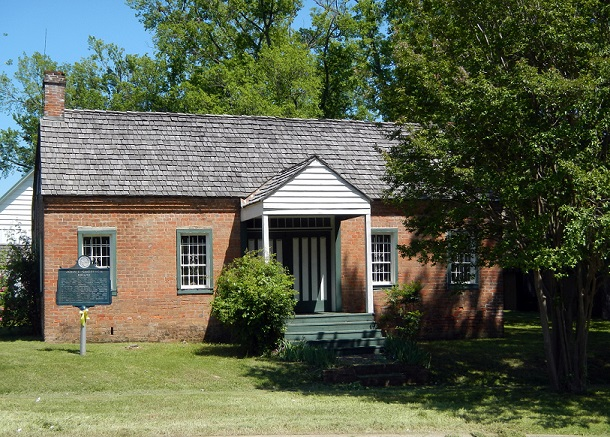

- Location within Arkansas Location within the United States
- Location: 508 N. Main St., Benton, Arkansas
- Coordinates: 34°34′9″N 92°35′23″W
- Area: less than one acre
- Built: 1852
- NRHP reference No.: 75000416
- Added to NRHP: October 10, 1975

The Shoppach House is a historic house at 508 North Main Street in Benton, Arkansas. Its front section is a brick structure, 1 1/2 stories in height, from which a single-story wood-frame ell extends to the rear. The house was built in 1852 by John Shoppach, and was the first brick house in Saline County. Shoppach's original plan called for the brick section to be organized similar to a typical dogtrot, with a central breezeway flanked by two rooms. The house was occupied by five generations of the Shoppach family.

The house was listed on the National Register of Historic Places in 1975.

== See also ==
- National Register of Historic Places listings in Saline County, Arkansas
