= Gann Row Historic District =

Historic district in Arkansas, United States

- Gan Row Historic District
- U.S. National Register of Historic Places
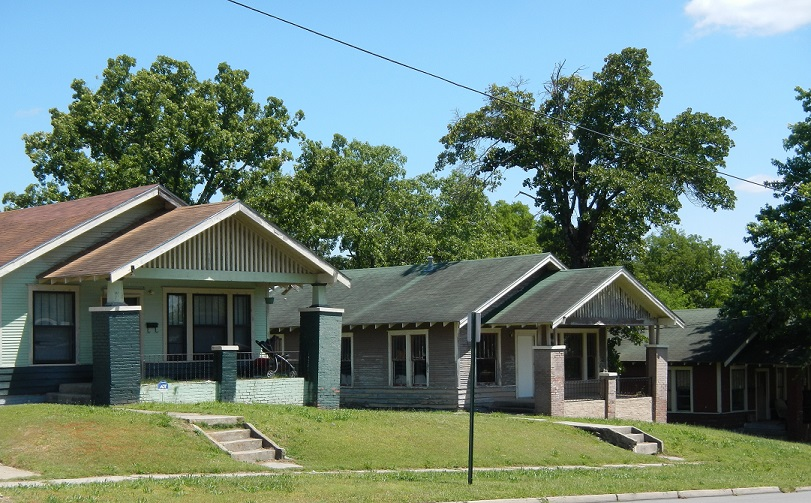

- Location within Arkansas Location within the United States
- Location: Bounded by Pine, Market, Maple and S. Main Sts., Benton, Arkansas
- Coordinates: 34°33′35″N 92°35′15″W
- Architectural style: Folk Victorian, American Craftsman
- NRHP reference No.: 99000106
- Added to NRHP: February 5, 1999

Gann Row Historic District is a historic district in Benton, Arkansas. The district includes thirteen residences built for Benton's middle-class population. Dr. Dewell Gan Sr., purchased most of the land in the district around 1890 and is responsible for building most of the homes. Four Folk Victorian homes in the district were built between 1880 and 1890; Gann renovated these in the 1920s, adding Craftsman details. Gann also built the remaining houses in the district in the 1920s; these were also designed in the Craftsman style. The district is still considered a middle-class residential area; it is bordered on three sides by other working-class housing and to the north by downtown Benton. It was listed on the National Register of Historic Places (NRHP) in 1999.

The district includes Gann House and Gann Building, which are separately NRHP-listed.

== See also ==
- National Register of Historic Places listings in Saline County, Arkansas
