= J. W. and Ann Lowe Clary House =

Historic house in Arkansas, United States

- U.S. National Register of Historic Places
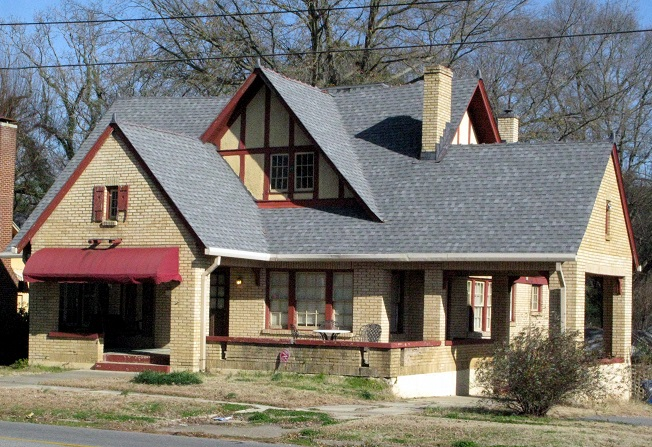
- Photo in 2012

- Location within Arkansas Location within the United States
- Location: 305 N. East St., Benton, Arkansas
- Coordinates: 34°33′56″N 92°35′6″W
- Area: less than one acre
- Built: 1926
- Architectural style: Bungalow/Craftsman, Tudor Revival
- NRHP reference No.: 93000053
- Added to NRHP: February 19, 1993

The J. W. and Ann Lowe Clary House is a historic house at 305 N. East St. in Benton, Arkansas. It is a two-story wood-frame structure, with an exterior of brick veneer and stucco. It has a complex roof line with a number of gables, including over a projecting front section and a side porte cochere. Built in 1926, the building exhibits a predominantly Tudor Revival style, with some Craftsman features, notably exposed rafters under some of its eaves.

The house was listed on the National Register of Historic Places in 1993.

== See also ==
- National Register of Historic Places listings in Saline County, Arkansas
