= Harmony Grove School District =

Harmony Grove School District may refer to:

- Harmony Grove School District (Ouachita County, Arkansas) - Near Camden
- Harmony Grove School District (Saline County, Arkansas)
