= Gann House =

Historic house in Arkansas, United States

- U.S. National Register of Historic Places
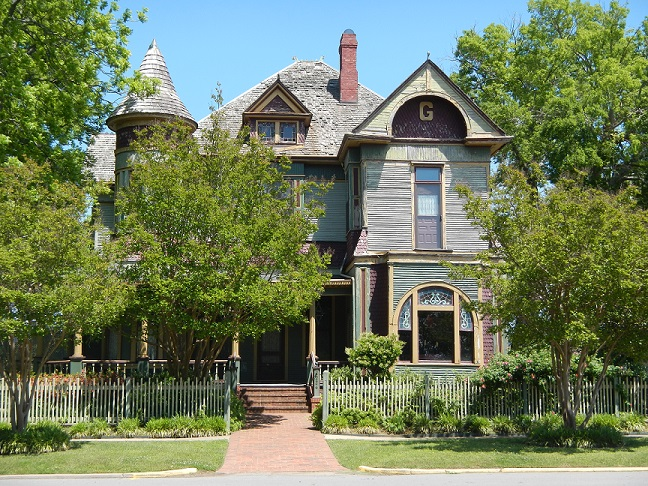

- Location within Arkansas Location within the United States
- Location: 224 S. Market St., Benton, Arkansas
- Coordinates: 34.56151°N 92.58794°W
- Area: less than one acre
- Built: c. 1895
- Architectural style: Queen Anne
- NRHP reference No.: 76000464
- Added to NRHP: January 2, 1976

The Gann House is a historic house located at 224 S. Market St. in Benton, Arkansas. The Queen Anne house, which was built circa 1895, has been described as "one of the most outstanding structures remaining in Benton" due to its architecture. The home's design features a rounded turret, a porch supported by fluted columns, and leaded and stained glass windows. Dr. Dewell Gann Sr., and his family lived in the house; Gann Sr., was a prominent local surgeon, while his son, Dewell Gann Jr., served as chief of staff of St. Vincent Infirmary in Little Rock.

The Gann House was added to the National Register of Historic Places on January 2, 1976. Two other historic sites in Benton, the Gann Building and the Gann Row Historic District, are also named for Gann Sr.

== See also ==
- National Register of Historic Places listings in Saline County, Arkansas
