= Rucker House (Bauxite, Arkansas) =

Historic house in Arkansas, United States

- U.S. National Register of Historic Places
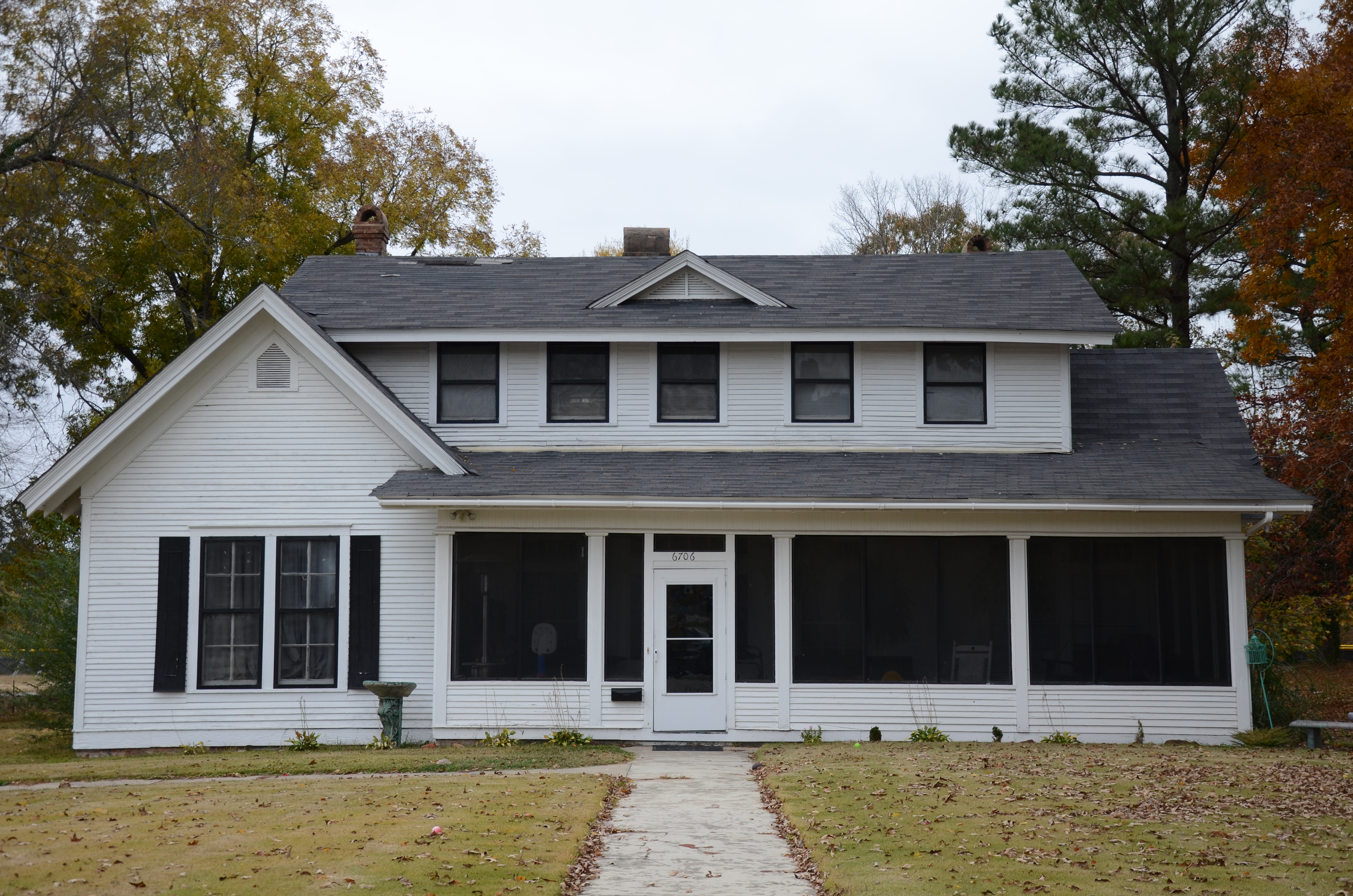

- Location within Arkansas Location within the United States
- Nearest city: Bauxite, Arkansas
- Coordinates: 34°33′21″N 92°30′37″W
- Area: 1.5 acres (0.61 ha)
- Built: 1905
- Built by: Pittsburgh Reduction Co.
- NRHP reference No.: 88000744
- Added to NRHP: June 16, 1988

The Rucker House, also known as the Caretaker's House, is a historic house at Benton and School Streets in Bauxite, Arkansas. It is a vernacular two-story wood-frame structure, with a side gable central section that has a cross-gable section at the western end, and a second wing extending northward from the eastern end. A porch extends across the front as far as the cross-gable section, with a shed roof supported by simple posts.

== History ==
The house was built in 1905 by the Pittsburgh Reduction Company, a predecessor of Alcoa, whose bauxite mining business dominated the local economy. The home was built for plant superintendent, W. A. Rucker, who lived in the home until 1938. His son, C. L. Rucker, would become a school board member and secure funding for the construction of a school for the community.

The house was listed on the National Register of Historic Places in 1988. It was deemed important as the only surviving, intact house of the original Bauxite, a company town that was established in 1903. It was home of the company's plant supervisor, W. A. Rucker.

== See also ==
- National Register of Historic Places listings in Saline County, Arkansas
