= Niloak Pottery =

Arkansas-based art pottery line

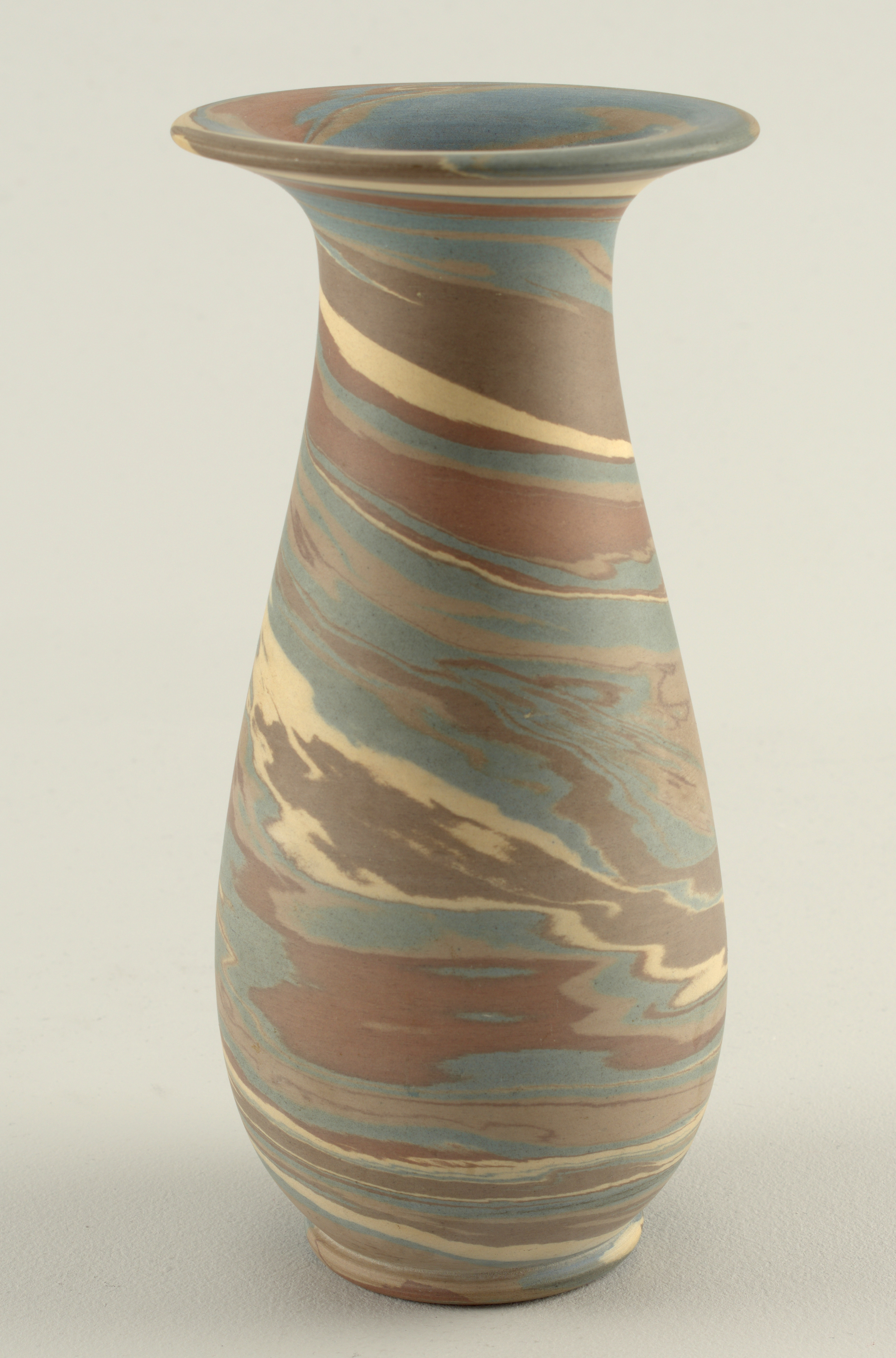
Niloak "Mission Swirl" vase in unglazed stoneware, c. 1900.

Niloak (/ˈnaɪloʊk/ NYLE-oke) is a line of American art pottery produced by the Eagle Pottery Company of Benton, Arkansas. Eagle was founded by Charles Dean Hyten and his brothers in the 1890s and was the largest pottery-ware business in the Benton area by 1904. The name is the reverse spelling of kaolin, the main ingredient of porcelain.

In 1909, Arthur Dovey joined Eagle to help Hyten, by then sole owner of the company, develop an operation for the manufacture of art pottery. Together they produced the Niloak product, the name taken from kaolin spelled backwards.

The company was in business from 1909 to 1946. The salient feature of Niloak was its "Mission Swirl"; creation attributed to either Dovey, Hyten or potter Fred Johnson. The swirl is a multi-colored pattern using different clays and resembling marbled paper. Niloak's Mission Swirl was usually of red, tan, blue and brown in a counter-clockwise direction.

During the Depression years, Eagle manufactured a line of Niloak called "Hywood", which featured more traditional glazed pottery to adapt to market conditions and sustain the business.

== See also ==
- Charles "Bullet" Dean Hyten House, listed on the National Register of Historic Places
- Arts and Crafts Movement
- Collector's Encyclopedia of Niloak
