= Dr. James Wyatt Walton House =

Historic house in Arkansas, United States

- U.S. National Register of Historic Places
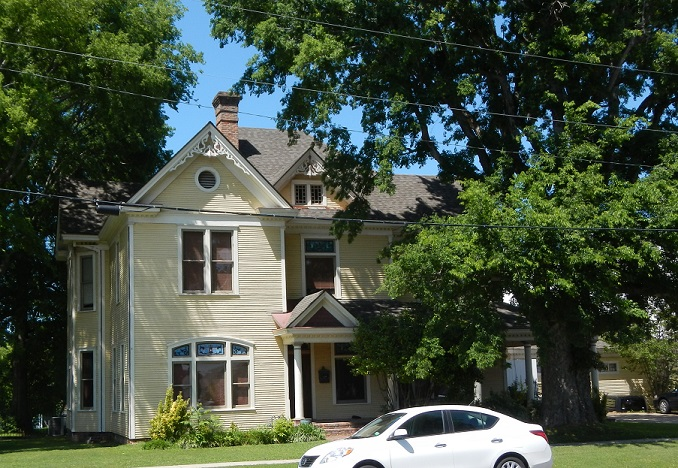

- Location within Arkansas Location within the United States
- Location: 301 W. Sevier, Benton, Arkansas
- Coordinates: 34°33′52″N 92°35′24″W
- Area: less than one acre
- Built: 1903
- Built by: John S. Odum
- Architect: Charles L. Thompson
- NRHP reference No.: 77000276
- Added to NRHP: December 22, 1977

The Dr. James Wyatt Walton House is a historic house at 301 West Sevier in Benton, Arkansas. It is a two-story wood-frame structure, with clapboard siding and a brick foundation. It has irregular massing, with a central section topped by a high hipped roof, from which a series of two-story gabled sections project. The gables of these sections are decorated with bargeboard trim, and a dentillated cornice encircles the building below the roofline. The house was designed by Charles L. Thompson and was built in 1903 for Benton's first doctor.

The house was listed on the National Register of Historic Places in 1977.

== See also ==
- National Register of Historic Places listings in Saline County, Arkansas
