= Dr. T.E. Buffington House =

Historic house in Arkansas, United States

- U.S. National Register of Historic Places
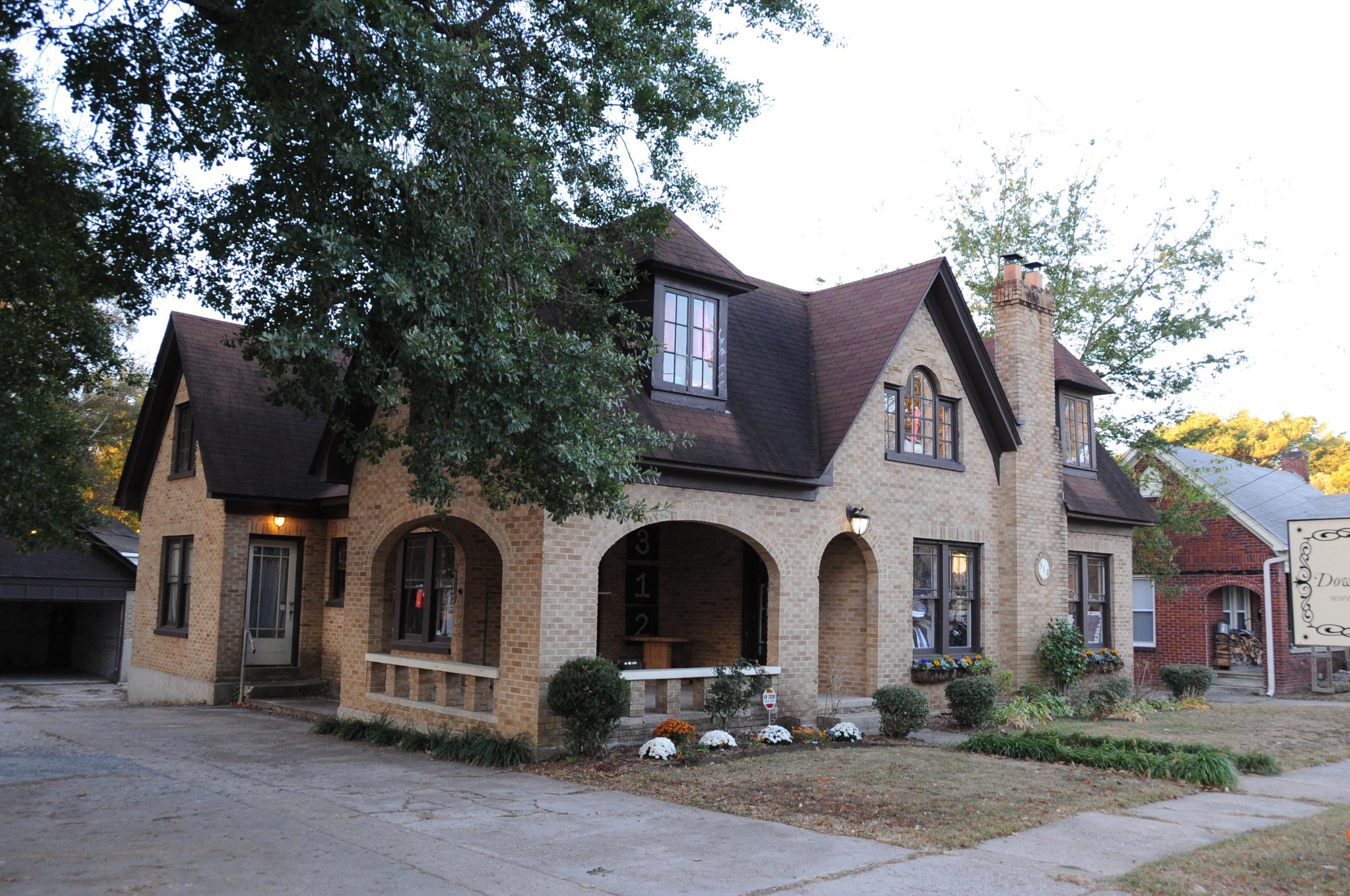

- Location within Arkansas Location within the United States
- Location: 312 W. South St., Benton, Arkansas
- Coordinates: 34°33′49″N 92°35′22″W
- Area: Less than one acre
- Built: 1928
- Architectural style: English Revival
- NRHP reference No.: 14000250
- Added to NRHP: October 1, 2014

The Dr. T.E. Buffington House is a historic house at 312 West South Street in Benton, Arkansas, United States. It is a 1 1/2-story structure, finished in brick, with a complex roof line that features cross gables and hip-roof dormers. The main entrance is set in a recessed porch at the northeast corner. The house is notable for its association with Dr. Turner Ellis Buffington, a Saline County native who practiced medicine in Benton and other county locations for most of his professional career, and served for two years as mayor of Benton. Buffington had this house built about 1928, at a time when the English Revival was starting to go out of fashion.

The house was listed on the National Register of Historic Places in 2014.

== See also ==
- National Register of Historic Places listings in Saline County, Arkansas
