= Andrew Hunter House =

Historic house in Arkansas, United States

- U.S. National Register of Historic Places
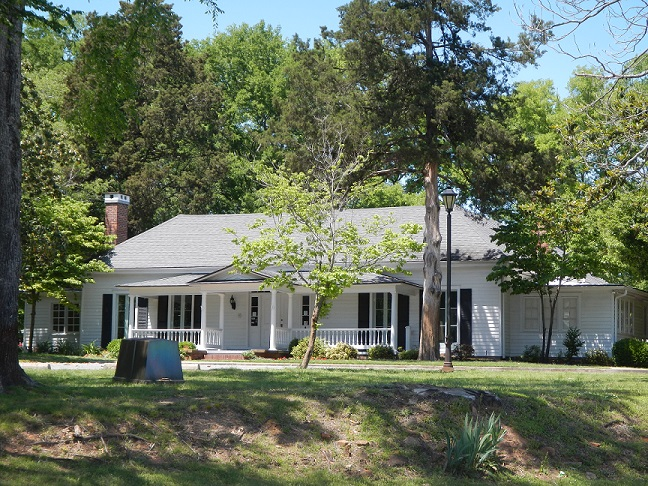

- Location within Arkansas Location within the United States
- Nearest city: Bryant, Arkansas
- Coordinates: 34°37′37″N 92°29′53″W
- Area: less than one acre
- Built: c.1870; 156 years ago
- NRHP reference No.: 76000466
- Added to NRHP: December 12, 1976

The Andrew Hunter House, also known as the Hunter-Dearborn House, is a historic house Arkansas Highway 5, a short way east of its junction with Arkansas Highway 183 in Bryant, Arkansas. It is a single-story wood-frame house, three bays wide, with a hip roof and a hip-roofed porch extending across part of its front, supported by four Tuscan columns. A pedimented pavilion projects above the entry steps from the porch. The house's construction date is uncertain (it may contain elements of an 1830s house within it), but its appearance is derived from alterations in the 1870s and early 20th century. The house is significant for its association with Reverend Andrew Hunter, who was instrumental in bringing Methodism to Arkansas. Hunter was born in Ireland and came to Arkansas in approximately 1836, and purchased this house around 1870 from William Field, its probable builder.

The house was listed on the National Register of Historic Places in 1976.

Since 2004, the house has been owned and operated by David L. Ouellette DDS.

== See also ==
- National Register of Historic Places listings in Saline County, Arkansas
