= Hughes Mound Site =

Archaeological site in Arkansas, United States

- Hughes Mound Site (3SA11)
- U.S. National Register of Historic Places
- Nearest city: Benton, Arkansas
- Area: 4.5 acres (1.8 ha)
- NRHP reference No.: 85003134
- Added to NRHP: October 10, 1985

The Hughes Mound Site, (3SA11), is an archeological site in Saline County, Arkansas near Benton. The 4.5-acre (1.8 ha) is an important Caddoan Mississippian culture village center, at the northeastern frontier of that civilization. It is the only known platform mound site south of Benton on the Saline River. The site has not been dated, but artifacts found there are consistent with the Caddoan period; no contact-period artifacts have been found.

The site was listed on the National Register of Historic Places in 1985 for its potential to yield information in the future.

== See also ==
- National Register of Historic Places listings in Saline County, Arkansas
