= Charles "Bullet" Dean Hyten House =

Historic house in Arkansas, United States

- U.S. National Register of Historic Places
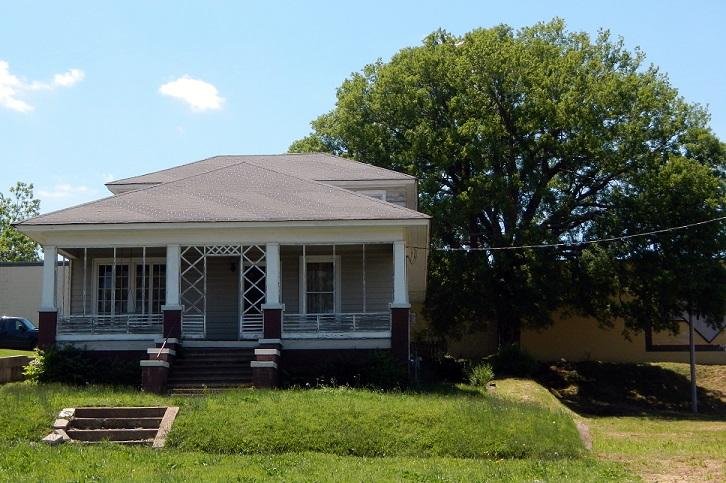

- Location within Arkansas Location within the United States
- Location: 211 Main St., Benton, Arkansas
- Coordinates: 34°33′44″N 92°35′13″W
- Built: 1922
- NRHP reference No.: 12000804
- Added to NRHP: September 24, 2012

The Charles "Bullet" Dean Hyten House is a historic house at 211 South Main Street in Benton, Arkansas. It is a single-story Bungalow-style structure, with a hip roof that extends over its front porch. The porch is supported by square columns set on brick piers, with decorative metal latticework between the columns. Built in 1922, the house significant as the only surviving house associated with Charles Hyten and Niloak pottery. Hyten and Arthur Dovey together created a pottery process in 1909 that achieved swirling of different colors and types of clay, yet held together without shattering when baked in a kiln. The process was patented by Hyten in 1928. It was the basis of the Arts and Crafts movement-era Niloak's Art pottery line.

The house was listed on the National Register of Historic Places in 2012.

== See also ==
- National Register of Historic Places listings in Saline County, Arkansas
