= Haskell, Arkansas =

- City
- Location of Haskell in Saline County, Arkansas.
- Coordinates: 34°30′34″N 92°37′50″W
- Country: United States
- State: Arkansas
- County: Saline

Area
  - Total: 4.92 sq mi (12.73 km^{2})
  - Land: 4.89 sq mi (12.67 km^{2})
  - Water: 0.023 sq mi (0.06 km^{2})
- Elevation: 312 ft (95 m)

Population (2020)
  - Total: 3,956
  - Estimate (2025): 4,362 ▲
  - Density: 808.5/sq mi (312.15/km^{2})
- Time zone: UTC-6 (Central (CST))
  - Summer (DST): UTC-5 (CDT)
- ZIP code: 72015
- Area code: 501
- FIPS code: 05-30640
- GNIS feature ID: 2403815
- Website: haskellar.gov

Haskell is a city in Saline County, Arkansas, United States. The population was 3,956 at the 2020 census. It is part of the Little Rock–North Little Rock–Conway Metropolitan Statistical Area.

== Geography ==
According to the United States Census Bureau, the city has a total area of 4.6 square miles (12 km^{2}), of which 4.6 square miles (12 km^{2}) is land and 0.04 square miles (0.10 km^{2}) (0.43%) is water.

== Demographics ==
Historical population
Census	Pop.	Note	%±
1930	180		—
1940	171		−5.0%
1950	209		22.2%
1960	215		2.9%
1970	239		11.2%
1980	1,125		370.7%
1990	1,342		19.3%
2000	2,645		97.1%
2010	3,990		50.9%
2020	3,956		−0.9%
2025 (est.)	4,362	▲	10.3%
U.S. Decennial Census

=== 2020 census ===
As of the 2020 census, Haskell had a population of 3,956. The median age was 36.8 years. 25.1% of residents were under the age of 18 and 13.0% of residents were 65 years of age or older. For every 100 females there were 113.8 males, and for every 100 females age 18 and over there were 117.0 males age 18 and over.

0.0% of residents lived in urban areas, while 100.0% lived in rural areas.

There were 1,280 households in Haskell, of which 42.2% had children under the age of 18 living in them. Of all households, 55.6% were married-couple households, 16.3% were households with a male householder and no spouse or partner present, and 21.0% were households with a female householder and no spouse or partner present. About 20.5% of all households were made up of individuals and 7.1% had someone living alone who was 65 years of age or older. Haskell also had 931 families.

There were 1,394 housing units, of which 8.2% were vacant. The homeowner vacancy rate was 1.3% and the rental vacancy rate was 10.1%.

Haskell racial composition
Race	Number	Percentage
White (non-Hispanic)	3,230	81.65%
Black or African American (non-Hispanic)	172	4.35%
Native American	27	0.68%
Asian	15	0.38%
Pacific Islander	5	0.13%
Other/Mixed	159	4.02%
Hispanic or Latino	348	8.8%

=== 2000 census ===
As of the census of 2000, there were 2,645 people, 724 households, and 563 families residing in the city. The population density was 572.4 inhabitants per square mile (221.0/km^{2}). There were 762 housing units at an average density of 164.9 per square mile (63.7/km^{2}). The racial makeup of the city was 89.07% White, 8.77% Black or African American, 0.72% Native American, 0.23% Asian, 0.19% from other races, and 1.02% from two or more races. 1.36% of the population were Hispanic or Latino of any race.

There were 724 households, out of which 42.8% had children under the age of 18 living with them, 60.2% were married couples living together, 12.8% had a female householder with no husband present, and 22.2% were non-families. 18.4% of all households were made up of individuals, and 6.8% had someone living alone who was 65 years of age or older. The average household size was 2.66 and the average family size was 3.03.

In the city, the population was spread out, with 21.8% under the age of 18, 8.5% from 18 to 24, 36.4% from 25 to 44, 20.9% from 45 to 64, and 12.4% who were 65 years of age or older. The median age was 36 years. For every 100 females, there were 126.5 males. For every 100 females age 18 and over, there were 131.7 males.

The median income for a household in the city was $33,583, and the median income for a family was $38,438. Males had a median income of $28,547 versus $21,346 for females. The per capita income for the city was $13,692. About 12.7% of families and 22.1% of the population were below the poverty line, including 18.0% of those under age 18 and 16.3% of those age 65 or over.

== Education ==
It is in the Harmony Grove School District, which operates Harmony Grove High School.
