= Red Parker =

American football coach (1931–2016)

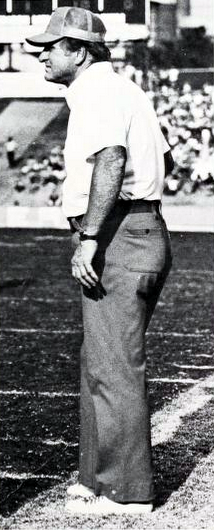

Biographical details
- Born: October 26, 1931; Hampton, Arkansas, U.S.
- Died: January 4, 2016 (aged 84); Little Rock, Arkansas, U.S.

Playing career
- 1949–1952: Arkansas A&M
- Position: Halfback

Coaching career (HC unless noted)
- 1953–1960: Fordyce HS (AR)
- 1961–1965: Arkansas A&M
- 1966–1972: The Citadel
- 1973–1976: Clemson
- 1980: Vanderbilt (OC/QB)
- 1981: Southern Arkansas
- 1982–1987: Delta State
- 1988–1991: Ole Miss (OC/QB)
- 1993–1995: Rison HS (AR)
- 1996–1998: Ouachita Baptist
- 1999–2002: Bearden HS (AR)
- 2003–2005: Fordyce HS (AR)
- 2008: Woodlawn HS (AR)
- 2010–2015: Harmony Grove HS (AR)

Head coaching record
- Overall: 137–127–8 (college); 105–15–4 (high school)

Accomplishments and honors

Awards
- ACC Coach of the Year (1974)

Jimmy Dale "Red" Parker (October 26, 1931 – January 4, 2016) was an American football coach. From 1961 to 1965, he served as the head football coach at the University of Arkansas at Monticello, where he compiled a 29–19–2 record. From 1966 to 1972, he coached at The Citadel in South Carolina. He compiled a 46–37 record there. From 1973 to 1976, he coached at Clemson University, where he compiled a 17–25–2 record. In 1981, he coached at Southern Arkansas University, where he compiled a 7–3 record. From 1982 to 1987, he coached at Delta State University. From 1996 to 1998, he coached at Ouachita Baptist University where he compiled a 10–20 record.

Parker was named the first high school football coach for the Harmony Grove Cardinals, in Benton, Arkansas. His team won the school's first varsity game against Poyen High School Indians on September 3, 2010, by a score of 35–14. He announced his resignation from Harmony Grove on October 28, 2015, effective at the end of the 2015 season, citing health reasons. He died on January 4, 2016, from complications of heart disease.

== Head coaching record ==
=== College ===
Year	Team	Overall	Conference	Standing	Bowl/playoffs
Arkansas A&M Boll Weevils (Arkansas Intercollegiate Conference) (1961–1965)
1961	Arkansas A&M	2–8	1–6	7th	
1962	Arkansas A&M	3–6–1	2–4–1	5th	
1963	Arkansas A&M	9–1	6–1	1st	
1964	Arkansas A&M	8–2	6–1	2nd	
1965	Arkansas A&M	7–2–1	5–1–1	1st	
Arkansas A&M:		29–19–2	20–13–2		
The Citadel Bulldogs (Southern Conference) (1966–1972)
1966	The Citadel	4–6	3–5	6th	
1967	The Citadel	5–5	2–4	7th	
1968	The Citadel	5–5	4–2	2nd	
1969	The Citadel	7–3	4–2	3rd	
1970	The Citadel	5–6	4–2	2nd	
1971	The Citadel	8–3	4–2	3rd	
1972	The Citadel	5–6	4–3	4th	
The Citadel:		39–34	25–20		
Clemson Tigers (Atlantic Coast Conference) (1973–1976)
1973	Clemson	5–6	4–2	3rd	
1974	Clemson	7–4	4–2	T–2nd	
1975	Clemson	2–9	2–3	5th	
1976	Clemson	3–6–2	0–4–1	7th	
Clemson:		17–25–2	10–11–1		
Southern Arkansas Muleriders (Arkansas Intercollegiate Conference) (1981)
1981	Southern Arkansas	7–3	3–3	T–3rd	
Southern Arkansas:		7–3	3–3		
Delta State Statesmen (Gulf South Conference) (1982–1987)
1982	Delta State	6–4	3–4	T–4th	
1983	Delta State	5–5	3–5	7th	
1984	Delta State	7–3–1	5–2–1	T–2nd	
1985	Delta State	4–6–1	3–4–1	5th	
1986	Delta State	6–4–1	4–3–1	T–4th	
1987	Delta State	6–4–1	3–4–1	T–5th	
Delta State:		34–26–4	21–22–4		
Ouachita Baptist Tigers (NAIA Division I independent) (1996)
1996	Ouachita Baptist	3–7			
Ouachita Baptist Tigers (Lone Star Conference) (1997–1998)
1997	Ouachita Baptist	4–6	3–5	T–8th	
1998	Ouachita Baptist	3–7	3–5	9th	
Ouachita Baptist:		10–20	6–10		
Total:		137–127–8			
National championship Conference title Conference division title or championship game berth
