= Preston Scroggin =

American politician

Member of the Arkansas House of Representatives from the 47th district
- In office January 13, 2003 – January 8, 2007
- Preceded by: Dwight Fite
- Succeeded by: Eddie Hawkins

Member of the Arkansas House of Representatives from the 43rd district
- In office January 8, 2001 – January 13, 2003
- Preceded by: Stephen Simon
- Succeeded by: Jeff Wood

Personal details
- Born: August 10, 1966 (age 58); Vilonia, Arkansas
- Political party: Democratic

Preston Scroggin (born August 10, 1966) is an American politician who served in the Arkansas House of Representatives from 2001 to 2007.
