= Leon Campbell (American football) =

American football player (1927–2002)

No. 78, 32, 28
- Position: Fullback

Personal information
- Born: July 1, 1927; Bauxite, Arkansas, U.S.
- Died: September 2, 2002 (aged 75); Little Rock, Arkansas, U.S.
- Listed height: 6 ft 0 in (1.83 m)
- Listed weight: 199 lb (90 kg)

Career information
- High school: Bauxite
- College: Arkansas
- NFL draft: 1950: 2nd round, 15th overall pick

Career history
- Baltimore Colts (1950); Chicago Bears (1952–1954); Pittsburgh Steelers (1955)

Awards and highlights
- Second-team All-SWC (1949); Arkansas Sports Hall of Fame (1977)

Career NFL statistics
- Rushing yards: 379
- Rushing average: 3.7
- Receptions: 20
- Receiving yards: 156
- Total touchdowns: 1
- Stats at Pro Football Reference

Leon L. Campbell (July 1, 1927 – September 2, 2002) was an American professional football fullback who played five seasons in the National Football League (NFL) for the Baltimore Colts, the Chicago Bears, and the Pittsburgh Steelers. Campbell played college football at the University of Arkansas before being a 2nd round selection (15th overall pick) in the 1950 NFL draft.
