= Ewell Ross McCright =

American politician

Ewell Ross McCright (4 December 1917 – 24 April 1990) of Benton, Saline County, Arkansas was a captain in the United States Air Force during World War II who was famous for maintaining secret journals detailing information about fellow prisoners of war while held captive in a German prison camp. For his actions, McCright was awarded the Legion of Merit posthumously in 2004.

McCright was a bombardier on a B-17 Flying Fortress bomber that was shot down over France on 23 January 1943. McCright was captured by German forces and taken to a German prisoner of war camp at Zagan, Poland. McCright remained a prisoner until 29 April 1945, when his camp was liberated by the Third United States Army under General George S. Patton.

During his captivity, McCright detailed the personal backgrounds and wartime injuries of 2,194 of his fellow prisoners in four journals, which he hid under the floorboards of the prisoner barracks. When he was transferred to another POW camp, McCright secretly carried the journals on a 34-mile forced march in place of food.

McCright's ledgers contained prisoner accounts of the gas chambers at Auschwitz, as well as details of Nazi atrocities such as the use of dogs to attack prisoners, and medical experimentation on prisoners. McCright's journals were presented as evidence before the allied war crimes trials at Nuremberg.

The ledgers were published in 1994 by Arnold Wright of Benton, Arkansas under the title Behind the Wire: Stalag Luft III, South Compound. McCright's work provided comfort for many families seeking information about the status of their loved ones.

In 2004, McCright was the first recipient of the Legion of Merit to receive the award for activities conducted while a prisoner of war.

McCright became an attorney after the war and served in the Arkansas House of Representatives from 1951 to 1953. He died on 24 April 1990 at the age of seventy-two. He is buried at Salem Cemetery in Saline County.
