= Andrew Hunter (Methodist preacher) =

American Methodist clergyman and politician

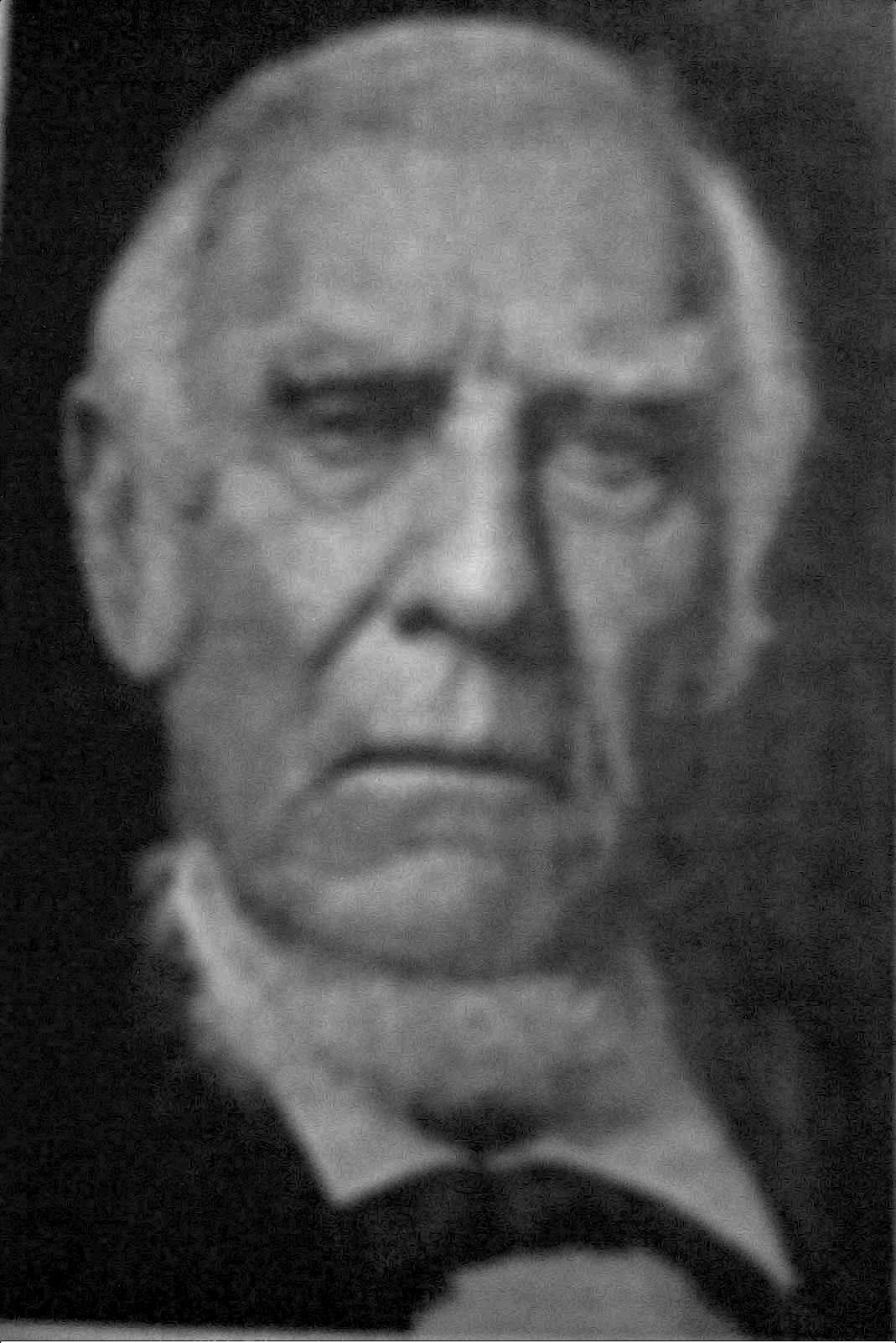
Andrew Hunter

Andrew Hunter (1813–1902) was an Irish-American Methodist preacher, sometimes referred to as "The Grand Old Man of Arkansas", "The Patriarch of Methodism", "The Nestor of Methodism in Arkansas", and "The Foremost Churchman in Arkansas".

== Early life ==
Hunter was born in Ballymoney, County Antrim, Ireland, the son of John Hunter, a linen textiles manufacturer. His family immigrated to the United States in 1815, when he was 2 years old, settling in Little York, Pennsylvania. While his mother had been a member of the Presbyterian Church while in Ireland, her husband was not affiliated with any sect. His father died when Andrew was 8 years old after a long illness. During this time the family was frequently visited by a Methodist minister, which resulted in the family becoming Members of the Methodist Church.

Hunter attended college in Missouri for a short time before moving in 1835 to Manchester, Missouri, near St. Louis, and began teaching school. While there he saw a letter in a church paper from Peter McGowan, the superintendent of South Indian Missionary District, urgently calling for teachers in Indian Schools. Hunter decided to travel 300 miles to the Indian Mission in Fort Gibson, a difficult journey over very rough terrain, during which he often slept out in the open. The school consisted of around 20 students, and was located near where the Kansas, Missouri and Texas Railroad crossed the Arkansas River north to Muskogee. Although Hunter was living in relative poverty, with rudimentary sleeping and eating conditions, Hunter later described this period as the happiest time of his life.

== Ministry ==
In 1836, due to his service in the school, Hunter was given a license to preach, and a recommendation from the quarterly conference, which consisted mostly of Indians. The Arkansas Conference had been set up the same year, and Hunter was received "on trial". The conference was divided into four districts, over which the presiding elders traveled quarterly. Hunter was first appointed to a missionary school at Bayou Baynard, beginning a long career as a Methodist minister. He was ordained a deacon in Fayetteville, Arkansas in 1839, and he became an elder in Little Rock, Arkansas. In the fall of 1842 he was made presiding elder of the Washington District, which comprised a large portion of Southern Arkansas. He served as pastor of what is now First United Methodist Church of Little Rock twice, first appointed in 1842. He became one of the most popular preachers in Arkansas as well being well respected throughout the country.

In 1866-67 he was elected to represent Dallas and Bradley Counties in the Arkansas State senate, and became president of the Senate. In 1866, Hunter was elected US Senator from Arkansas by the State Legislature, along with Elisha Baxter, however he was not allowed to take his seat in Congress due to disenfranchisement of Southern States at the beginning of Reconstruction. Augustus Hill Garland took his place instead.

Hunter died on June 3, 1902. He was buried beside his wife in Oakland Cemetery.

== Personal life ==
Hunter married Anna M. Jones in York, Pennsylvania, in 1844, and they had four children. Anna Hunter was active in establishing the Woman's Missionary Society of the Little Rock Conference in 1878. She was elected president of the organization in 1879, serving for five years.

The Andrew Hunter House, a house he lived in near Bryant, Arkansas, built in c.1870, is listed on the U.S. National Register of Historic Places.

== Character ==
Dr. James Anderson, in his Centennial History of Arkansas Methodism wrote that, "There was a remarkable weight of character about the man, his personal dignity, his unselfish and blameless life, and his wisdom won the especial regard of all men."

At the time of Hunter's death, Dr. John H. Riggin described him as a pulpiteer, saying: "His mellow, vibrant voice made his speech impressive. His hearers soon understood that there was nothing rash or inconsiderate in his words, nothing light or trifling, nothing for show or merely to attract attention to the speaker, that the message – not himself – was his concern."
