= Elisha Baxter =

American politician (1827–1899)

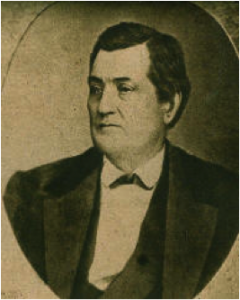

10th Governor of Arkansas
- In office January 6, 1873 – November 12, 1874
- Lieutenant: Volney V. Smith
- Preceded by: Ozra Amander Hadley (acting)
- Succeeded by: Augustus Hill Garland

Personal details
- Born: September 1, 1827 Rutherford County, North Carolina, U.S.
- Died: May 31, 1899 (aged 71) Batesville, Arkansas, U.S.
- Party: Republican

Elisha Baxter (September 1, 1827 – May 31, 1899) was an American businessman and politician who served as the tenth governor of Arkansas from 1873 to 1874.

== Early life and career ==
Baxter was born in Rutherford County, North Carolina. He sought and obtained an appointment to the United States Military Academy at West Point. Baxter's father, William, strongly opposed his appointment, and Baxter resigned it. He returned home and became a businessman. He ran a successful mercantile business in Rutherford County with his brother-in-law Spenser Eaves.

In 1852, Baxter moved to Batesville, Arkansas, and opened a mercantile business with his brother, Taylor. It soon failed. Baxter joined the Whig party and was elected mayor of Batesville in 1853. One year later he was elected as state representative from Independence County to the tenth general assembly. He studied law and, in 1856, was admitted to the Arkansas bar. He was reelected to the House in 1858 and served two terms from Independence County, leaving in 1860.

== American Civil War ==
At the outbreak of the Civil War, he had been conflicted about which side he supported. When General Samuel Curtis and the 2nd Iowa Infantry occupied Batesville in the Spring of 1862, the General recognized Baxter as a loyal Unionist, and tried to bestow upon him the title of "Regt. of loyal Arkansians" which he refused. When Curtis left Batesville, Baxter was forced to flee to Missouri. He was captured, brought back to Little Rock, and charged with treason, only to escape later before his trial could take place. He describes this episode in his life in his autobiography:

Through a fortunate combination of circumstances I escaped from prison before my trial came on and lived for eighteen days in the forist(sic) and fields near Little Rock without a morsil(sic) of food except such raw corn and berries as I could gather in my lone wanderings. While a prisoner I felt that I was ungenerously treated by the harsh criticisms of the press and individuals not only in regard to my want of loyalty to the southern caus(sic) but also with regard to my supposed want of courage. I therefore resolved if God would grant me deliverance I would at once enter the Federal Army.

When Baxter returned to Batesville, he organized the 4th Arkansas Mounted Infantry for the Union and commanded it until he was named a State Supreme Court judge by Governor Murphy in the Spring 1864. Shortly after being named a judge, he was elected to the U.S. Senate by the legislature along with Rev. Andrew Hunter, but they were not seated in the Senate as the senate did not recognize the Murphy Administration. In 1867, he was appointed by Governor Clayton judge of the 3rd Judicial circuit. In 1868 he was appointed the 1st Congressional district of Arkansas. He held these two positions until he was nominated for governor in 1872. Baxter was virtually unknown and privately clean of scandals, unlike most of the Minstrels. They believed he could attract votes from Unionists and Northerners, their core base, as well as natives of the state. He was captured and tried for treason.

He escaped north and joined the 4th Arkansas Mounted Infantry (Union), serving as colonel of the regiment. In 1864, after Arkansas was occupied by Union troops, Baxter was appointed as Justice of the Arkansas Supreme Court, but he did not serve in that position. He and William Meade Fishback were chosen by the new legislature in May 1864 as the two U.S. senators from Arkansas, but in February 1865, their admission was denied by congressional Republicans displeased with Lincoln for trying to restore Southern representation in Congress so easily. In mid-1865, Baxter formed a law partnership in Little Rock with future U.S. Congressman and fellow Unionist James M. Hinds.

== Reconstruction era ==
In 1868 the Reconstruction-era state legislature elected him and Andrew Hunter to the US Senate, but his appointment was blocked once again by Congress because of the southern states' refusal to extend the franchise to freedmen. From 1868 to 1872, Baxter served as a judge on the 3rd Circuit Court.

In 1872, Baxter was elected as a Republican Governor of Arkansas over Joseph Brooks in a controversial election that resulted in the Brooks-Baxter War. Baxter was physically removed from the governor's office by Brooks and state militia loyal to him. Baxter was not restored to the governorship until a month later.

During his term, state delegates passed a new constitution that shortened the term of the governor and restored the franchise to ex-Confederates. Baxter declined to accept the 1874 nomination for governor. Due to the disenfranchisement of most blacks in the 1890s, the Republican Party was reduced in Arkansas. Democrats established a one-party state that survived into the 1960s. Baxter was the last Republican governor to be elected in Arkansas until Winthrop Rockefeller in 1966, after the Republican Party began a revival there.

== Later life and legacy ==
After leaving office, Baxter returned to his farm near Batesville. He ran for a position in the Arkansas House of Representatives in 1878 but was unsuccessful. He died in Batesville, Arkansas and is buried at Oaklawn Cemetery there. Baxter County was named after him.

== Personal life ==
In 1849 Baxter married Harriet Patton, also from Rutherford County, and together they had six children: Milliard P., Edward A., Catherine M., George E., Hattie O., and Fannie E. Baxter was a brother of federal judge John Baxter, and an uncle of Wyoming territorial governor George W. Baxter.

Party political offices
First	Republican nominee for Governor of Arkansas; 1872	Vacant Title next held by A. Bishop
Political offices
Preceded by Ozra Amander Hadley; Acting	Governor of Arkansas; January 6, 1873 – November 12, 1874	Succeeded by Augustus Hill Garland
