= Susan Dunn =

American opera singer

Susan Dunn (born July 23, 1954) is an American operatic soprano who works as a professor of vocal music at Duke University.

== Early life and education ==
Susan Dunn was born in Malvern, Arkansas to A.C. and Cynthia Dunn and grew up in Bauxite, Arkansas. Dunn has a younger sister, Phyllis Dunn Jankowski. Dunn credits her childhood musical experiences at New Hope United Methodist Church as fostering an early love for singing within her. Her first solo was in Bible School at the age of 5. Dunn would remain active in her church's music program throughout her childhood and teenage years. When Dunn was in sixth grade, she convinced her parents to buy her a piano and began taking piano lessons every Saturday for many years in Benton, Ark. Dunn graduated from Bauxite High School in 1972.

In 1972, she attended Hendrix College and studied vocal music with Harold Thompson. After graduating from Hendrix College in 1976, Dunn went on to graduate studies at Indiana University Bloomington from which she earned a Masters of Music in Vocal Performance in 1980.

== Career ==
Dunn began her professional performing career in the early 1980s appearing in operas with good regional companies in the United States. She made her professional debut in 1982 in the title role of Verdi's Aida with the Peoria Civic Opera. After winning several major awards and competitions, Dunn's career began to take off. In 1985 she sang Sieglinde in Die Walküre at Carnegie Hall. In 1986, Dunn made her debut at Avery Fisher Hall with Zubin Mehta and the New York Philharmonic as the soprano soloist in a production of Verdi's Requiem. That same year she made her European debut as Hélène in Les vêpres siciliennes at the Teatro Comunale di Bologna and her debut at La Scala as Aida. In 1987 she also made her debut with Robert Shaw and the Atlanta Symphony Orchestra and Chorus in performances and in the Telarc recording of Verdi’s Requiem, which went on to win 3 Grammys in 1989.

In 1987, Dunn made her debut with Cincinnati Opera as Desdemona in Verdi's Otello. Dunn reprised the role the following year in her debut with Opera Australia. Dunn made several other debuts in 1988 including the role of Leonora in Verdi's Il trovatore with San Diego Opera, Leonora in Verdi's La forza del destino with Lyric Opera of Chicago, and Elisabetta in Verdi's Don Carlo with Dallas Opera. Dunn also sang with James Conlon and the Orchestra of the Maggio Musicale at the 1988 Edinburgh International Festival. In 1989, Dunn made her debut with the Vienna State Opera as Amelia in Verdi's Un ballo in maschera and reprised the role later that year in her debut with the Houston Grand Opera. Dunn also recorded Verdi's Requiem with Robert Shaw and the Atlanta Symphony that year which went on to win a Grammy Award.

In 1990, Dunn made her debut with the Metropolitan Opera as Leonora in Verdi's Il trovatore and her Carnegie Hall debut with the Opera Orchestra of New York as Elena in Verdi's I vespri siciliani. In 1991, Dunn made her Cologne Opera debut as Amelia in Verdi's Simon Boccanegra. In 1992, Dunn made her debut at London's Albert Hall with the London Symphony Orchestra. Dunn continued to be a prominent figure on the opera stage until the mid-1990s when she decided to take a teaching position at Duke University. Dunn has appeared with other notable companies such as the San Francisco Opera, Washington National Opera and Pittsburgh Opera.

Dunn has also performed with several notable orchestras including the Orchestre de Paris, the Rotterdam Philharmonic Orchestra, the Royal Concertgebouw Orchestra, the American Symphony Orchestra, the Atlanta Symphony Orchestra, the Berlin Radio Symphony Orchestra, the Pittsburgh Symphony Orchestra, the Chicago Symphony, and the Minnesota Orchestra among others.

Dunn has performed at several notable music festivals including the Tanglewood Festival, the Cincinnati May Festival, the Ravinia Festival, Wolf Trap, the Casals Festival, the Festival Saint Denis and the Northwest Chamber Music Festival among others.

Dunn has worked with some of the world's best conductors, including Sir Georg Solti, Riccardo Chailly, Claudio Abbado, James Conlon, Lorin Maazel, Seiji Ozawa, Edo de Waart, Zubin Mehta and Daniel Barenboim among others.

Throughout her career, Dunn has performed as a solo recitalist and chamber musician singing at such places as Avery Fisher Hall and Lincoln Center among others.

In 1994, Dunn was appointed to Duke University's music department as a professor of the practice. Although she still performs professionally, she spends most of her time heading the university's vocal music program and directing its opera division.

== Opera roles ==
- Abigaille, Nabucco (Verdi)
- Aïda, Aïda (Verdi)
- Amalia, I masnadieri (Verdi)
- Amelia, Un ballo in maschera (Verdi)
- Desdemona, Otello (Verdi)
- Donna Anna, Don Giovanni (Mozart)
- Elena, I vespri siciliani (Verdi)
- Elisabetta, Don Carlos (Verdi)
- Giovanna, Giovanna d'Arco (Verdi)
- Giulietta di Kelbar, Un giorno di regno (Verdi)
- Lady Macbeth, Macbeth (Verdi)
- Leonora, Il trovatore (Verdi)
- Leonora, La forza del destino (Verdi)
- Maria/Amelia, Simon Boccanegra (Verdi)
- Odabella, Attila (Verdi)
- Sieglinde, Die Walküre (Wagner)
- Suor Angelica, Suor Angelica (Puccini)

== Personal life ==
Dunn is married to American conductor and composer Scott Tilley.

== Selected discography ==
- "Beethoven: Mass in C" with Riccardo Chailly and the Berlin Radio Symphony Orchestra, Decca Records, 1987.
- "Susan Dunn performs Verdi, Beethoven and Wagner" with the orchestra of the Teatro Comunale di Bologna and Riccardo Chailly, Polygram Records, 1990.
- "Verdi: Requiem & Operatic Choruses" with Robert Shaw and the Atlanta Symphony Orchestra, Telarc Records, 1990.
- "Arnold Schoenberg: Gurrelieder" with Riccardo Chailly and the Berlin Radio Symphony Orchestra, Polygram Records, 1991.
- "Mahler: Das klagende Lied" with Riccardo Chailly and the Berlin Radio Symphony Orchestra, Polygram Records, 1992.
- "Absolute Heaven" with Robert Shaw and the Atlanta Symphony Orchestra, Telarc Records, 1997.
- "Wagner: Die Walküre" (Act I) with Lorin Maazel and the Pittsburgh Symphony Orchestra, Telarc Records, 2002.

== Selected television and DVD appearances ==
- Verdi's I vespri siciliani with Bologna Opera. Originally aired on television in 1986 and was released on DVD in 2005.
- Verdi's Giovanna d'Arco with Bologna Opera. Originally aired on television in 1989 and was released on DVD in 2005.

== Honors and awards ==
- Awarded the 1988 Hendrix College Distinguished Alumna award.
- Named a University of Illinois Distinguished Alumna
- Was awarded the 2005 Baccarat Award for achievement in the arts by the Licia Albanese Puccini Foundation.

== Sources ==
- David Cummings: "Susan Dunn", Grove Music Online ed. L. Macy (Accessed September 22, 2008), (subscription access)
