= Royal Theatre (Benton, Arkansas) =

- U.S. National Register of Historic Places
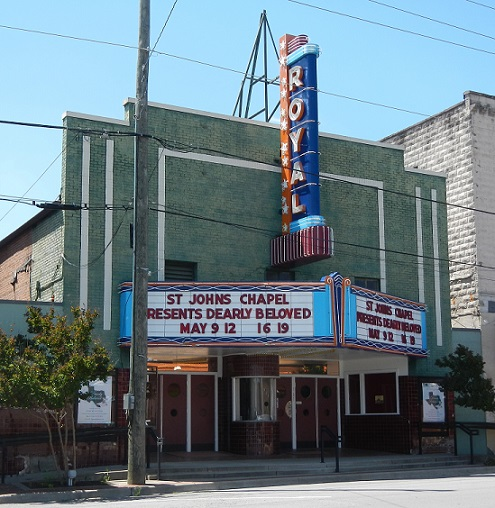

- Location within Arkansas Location within the United States
- Location: 111 S. Market St., Benton, Arkansas
- Coordinates: 34°33′47″N 92°35′18″W
- Area: less than one acre
- Built: 1948–49
- Architect: Frank Ginocchio, Edwin B. Cromwell
- Architectural style: Moderne
- NRHP reference No.: 03000955
- Added to NRHP: September 27, 2003

The Royal Theatre at 111 S. Market St. in Benton, Arkansas was built in 1948–49 as an extensive renovation of a prior theatre, and is already deemed historic.

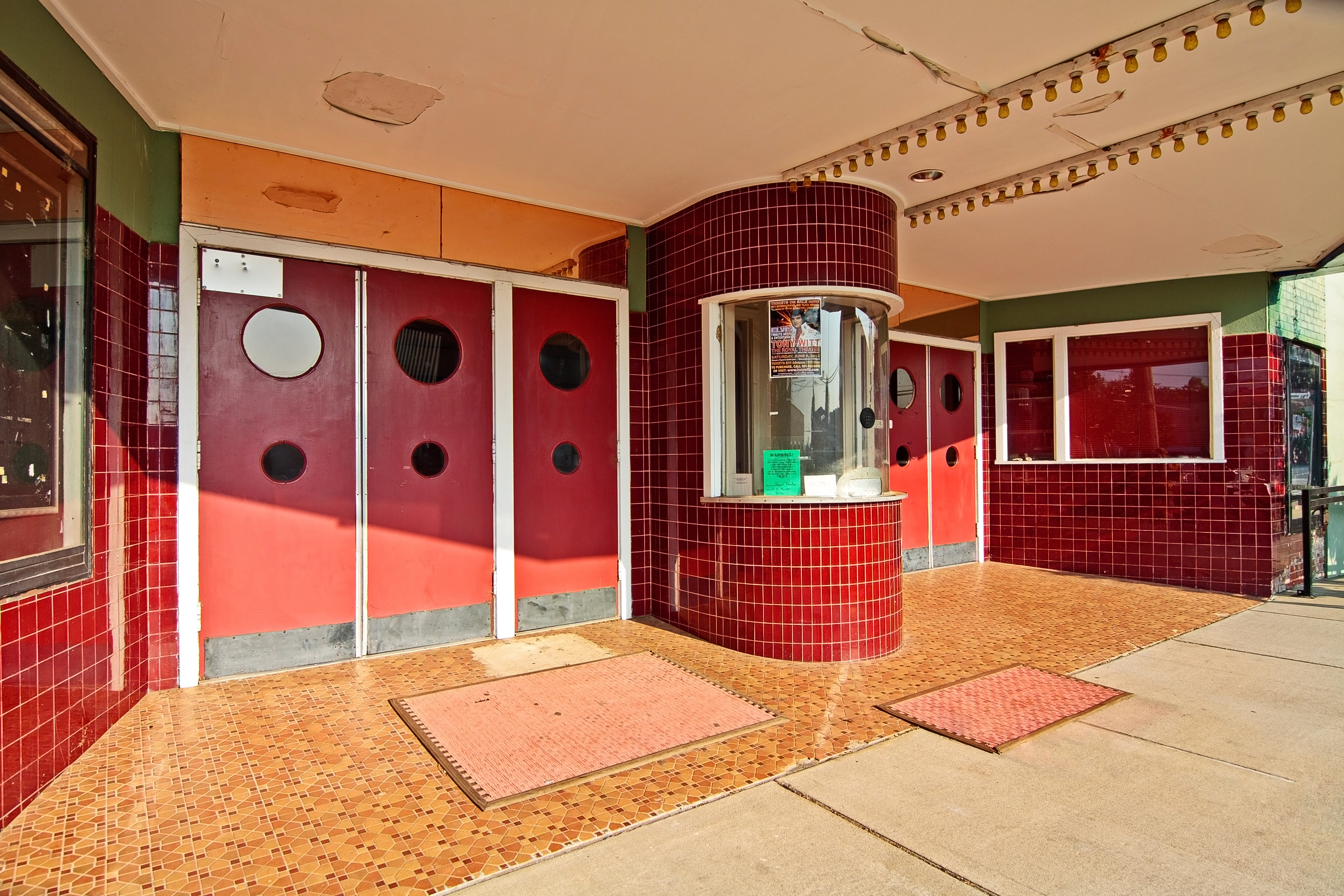
Ticket booth

The oldest part of the theatre was part of the 1920 "Imp" (apparently for "Independent Motion Pictures") theatre. The sign and marquee of the theatre, and the rest of the 1948–49 redesign, were designed by Little Rock architects Frank Ginocchio and Edwin B. Cromwell in Moderne style. Ginocchio and Cromwell had designed a Royal Theatre in Little Rock that used the sign and marquee; they reused the material in this Benton theatre later.

In 1996 the Royal Theatre was bought and renovated by actor Jerry Van Dyke. The theatre was renovated as was most of the block that the theatre was located on. Jerry Van Dyke also added Jerry Van Dyke's Soda Shoppe, a candy store, a baseball card trading store, as well as a small antique store on the same block as the theatre. Jerry Van Dyke sold the Royal Theatre and the rest of the property in 2000 and 2001. The Royal Theatre was actually donated to the Central Arkansas Community Players, who then changed the name of the theatre to the "Royal Players" and continues to perform in it to this day

The building was listed on the National Register of Historic Places in 2003.

== See also ==
- National Register of Historic Places listings in Saline County, Arkansas
