= Pleasant Hill Methodist Church =

Historic church in Arkansas, United States

- U.S. National Register of Historic Places
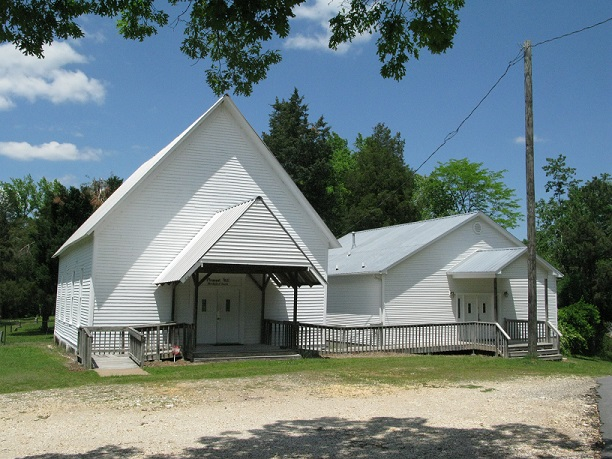

- Location within Arkansas Location within the United States
- Location: Jct. of Lawson and Lake Norrell Rds., Pleasant Hill, Arkansas
- Coordinates: 34°41′47″N 92°36′56″W
- Area: less than one acre
- Built: 1894
- Built by: Walter Overhault
- Architectural style: Greek Revival, Other, Vernacular Greek Revival
- NRHP reference No.: 91000684
- Added to NRHP: June 5, 1991

Pleasant Hill Methodist Church is a United Methodist church in Pleasant Hill, Saline County, Arkansas. The church was built by Walter Overhault in 1894 to replace the previous log structure used by the congregation. Locals of various religious denominations assisted in the church's construction, and the church has also served as a community center; it also hosts the yearly community reunion each July. The church was added to the National Register of Historic Places on June 5, 1991; it represents one of the best surviving examples of the simple Greek Revival style wood-frame churches of rural Arkansas.

== See also ==
- National Register of Historic Places listings in Saline County, Arkansas
