= Bauxite School District =

School district in Arkansas, United States

Address
- 800 School Street Bauxite, Arkansas, 72011; United States

District information
- Type: Public
- Grades: PreK–12
- NCES District ID: 0502790

Students and staff
- Students: 1,609
- Teachers: 132.06
- Staff: 97.6
- Student–teacher ratio: 12.18

Other information
- Website: bauxiteminers.org

Bauxite School District 14 is a school district in Saline County, Arkansas, United States, headquartered in Bauxite.

Its area includes, in addition to most of Bauxite, sections of Benton, and Tull.

== Academic performance ==
After years of trailing behind its more suburban counterparts in Saline County, Bauxite Public Schools have improved in recent years. Graduation rates rose over 7% from 2007 to 2010 to 97.2% with a dropout rate of 0.2%. The district expenditure per student as of 2010 was $7367, which, when matched with the state's per-pupil expenditure, totaled $15,675 spent per student in the district. In terms of teacher performance, 97% of all teachers in the district are completely certified, with 75.2% of instructors holding a bachelor's degree and the remaining 24.8% holding a master's degree.

== Schools ==
- Bauxite High School
- Bauxite Middle School
- Pine Haven Elementary School
- Miner Academy (conversion charter school)
