= Harmony Grove High School (Haskell, Arkansas) =

Location
- 2621 Hwy 229; Haskell (Benton postal address), Arkansas 72015; United States; 34°30′29″N 92°38′37″W

Information
- School type: Public comprehensive
- Status: Open
- School district: Harmony Grove School District
- NCES District ID: 0507320
- CEEB code: 040165
- NCES School ID: 050732000444
- Teaching staff: 51.29 (FTE)
- Grades: 9–12
- Enrollment: 306 (2023–2024)
  - Grade 10: 104
  - Grade 11: 101
  - Grade 12: 101
- Student to teacher ratio: 5.97
- Education system: ADE Smart Core Curriculum
- Classes offered: Regular, Career Focus, Advanced Placement (AP)
- Colors: Red and white
- Athletics conference: 3A Region 5 (2012–14)
- Mascot: Cardinal
- Team name: Harmony Grove Cardinals
- Accreditation: ADE
- Yearbook: The Cardinal
- Affiliation: Arkansas Activities Association (AAA)
- Website: www.harmonygrovesd.org/102585_2 (7–9) www.harmonygrovesd.org/102588_2 (10–12)

Harmony Grove High School is a public junior/senior high school that provides comprehensive secondary education for students in grades seven through twelve in Haskell, Arkansas (with a Benton postal address), United States. A part of the Harmony Grove School District, the school is often referred to as Benton Harmony Grove High School based on the postal address stating "Benton".

== Academics ==
The assumed course of study for students follow the Smart Core curriculum developed by the Arkansas Department of Education (ADE). Students complete regular (core and elective) and career focus courses and exams and may select Advanced Placement (AP) coursework and exams that provide an opportunity for college credit. The school is accredited by the ADE.

== Extracurricular activities ==
The mascot and athletic emblem for Harmony Grove High School is the Cardinal with red and white serving as school colors.

=== Athletics ===
For 2012–2016 school years, the school participates in interscholastic competition within the 3A Classification and 3A-5 Conference administered by the Arkansas Activities Association (AAA) in such sports as football, soccer (boys/girls), golf (boys/girls), cross country (boy/girls), basketball, baseball, softball, and competitive cheer.

Benton Harmony Grove won the state softball championship for three consecutive years (2002, 2003, 2004).

== Notable alumni ==
- Jimmy "Red" Parker—American football coach who started the school's football program in 2009.
