= Pleasant Hill, Saline County, Arkansas =

Pleasant Hill, Arkansas
- Unincorporated community
- Location within Arkansas Location within the United States
- Coordinates: 34°41′47″N 92°36′57″W
- Country: United States
- State: Arkansas
- County: Saline
- Elevation: 404 ft (123 m)
- Time zone: UTC-6 (Central (CST))
  - Summer (DST): UTC-5 (CDT)
- Area code: 501

Pleasant Hill is an unincorporated community in Saline County, Arkansas, United States. Pleasant Hill is 9.2 miles (14.8 km) north of Benton. The Pleasant Hill Methodist Church, which is listed on the National Register of Historic Places, is located in Pleasant Hill. Pleasant Hill was established before the Civil War as an agricultural community. The church has historically served as a community center and hosts a community reunion on the third Sunday of July each year.
