= George Cole (American football) =

American football player, coach, and administrator (1906–1978)

Biographical details
- Born: February 24, 1906; Bauxite, Arkansas, U.S.
- Died: January 24, 1978 (aged 71); Fayetteville, Arkansas, U.S.

Playing career

Football
- 1925–1927: Arkansas

Baseball
- 1926–1928: Arkansas
- Position: Quarterback (football)

Coaching career (HC unless noted)

Football
- 1928–1929: Warren HS (AR)
- 1930–1933: Ozarks
- 1934–1941: Arkansas (assistant)
- 1942: Arkansas
- 1945–1958: Arkansas (assistant)

Administrative career (AD unless noted)
- 1930–1934: Ozarks
- 1957–1970: Arkansas (assistant AD)
- 1970–1973: Arkansas

Head coaching record
- Overall: 16–24–1 (college)

Accomplishments and honors

Awards
- First-team All-SWC (1927)

George R. Cole (February 24, 1906 – January 24, 1978) was an American football player, coach, and college athletics administrator. He served as the head football coach at the College of the Ozarks—now known as the University of the Ozarks—in Clarksville, Arkansas from 1930 to 1933 and the University of Arkansas in 1942, compiling a record of 3–7. Cole was also the athletic director at Arkansas from 1970 to 1973.

== Biography ==
Cole was born in 1906 in Bauxite, Arkansas. He played quarterback for the Arkansas football team. In 1927, he was selected to the All-Southwest Conference team. During the 1927 season, he broke the school's single season scoring record, which stood until 1965. During his career, he scored 185 points, scoring 22 touchdowns, and making seven field goals. He also played baseball during his college career.

After graduating from Arkansas, Cole coached high school football at Warren High School, then moved to College of the Ozarks (now University of the Ozarks). In 1934, he became an assistant coach at Arkansas, while Fred Thomsen was head coach.

In his only season, he compiled a 3–7 record. After 1942, he left Arkansas to serve in World War II. He returned to Arkansas following the war as an assistant coach. He served in various on-field capacities as a coach, recruiter, and scout until he moved to administrative work in 1958. He replaced John Barnhill as athletic director in 1970. Six years later, Cole retired.

Cole was selected to the Arkansas Sports Hall of Fame in 1963, and, in 1974, he was selected to the Collegiate Athletic Directors Hall of Fame. He died on January 24, 1978, in Fayetteville, Arkansas.

== Head coaching record ==
=== College ===
Year	Team	Overall	Conference	Standing	Bowl/playoffs
Ozarks Mountaineers (Independent) (1930–1933)
1930	Ozarks	2–6			
1931	Ozarks	4–4			
1932	Ozarks	1–5			
1933	Ozarks	6–2–1			
Ozarks:		13–17–1			
Arkansas Razorbacks (Southwest Conference) (1942)
1942	Arkansas	3–7	0–6	7th	
Arkansas:		3–7	0–6		
Total:		16–24–1			
