= Harmony Grove School District (Saline County, Arkansas) =

School district in Arkansas, United States

Location
- 2621 Hwy 229; Haskell, Arkansas (Benton postal address) 72015-7206 United States
- Coordinates: 34°30′29″N 92°38′37″W

District information
- Grades: K–12
- Accreditation: Arkansas Department of Education
- Schools: 4
- NCES District ID: 0507320

Students and staff
- Students: 1,132
- Teachers: 76.26 (on FTE basis)
- Staff: 144.26 (on FTE basis)
- Student–teacher ratio: 14.84

Other information
- Website: harmonygrovesd.org

Harmony Grove School District 614 (HGSD) is a public school district based in Haskell, Arkansas, United States; it has a Benton postal address but the district headquarters are in Haskell. HGSD enrollment averages more than 1,200 students attending the four schools located on one 26 acres (11 ha) campus providing early childhood, elementary and secondary education that make up the district. The school district encompasses Haskell and a very small sliver of Benton.

The district and its schools are accredited by the Arkansas Department of Education (ADE). Local Education Agency (LEA)#: 6304000

== Schools ==
- Harmony Grove High School, serving approximately 310 students in grades 10 through 12.
- Harmony Grove Jr High School, serving approximately 285 students in grades 7 through 9.
- Harmony Grove Middle School, serving approximately 265 students in grades 4 through 6.
- Westbrook Elementary School, serving approximately 400 students in kindergarten through grade 3.
