= Gann Building =

- U.S. National Register of Historic Places
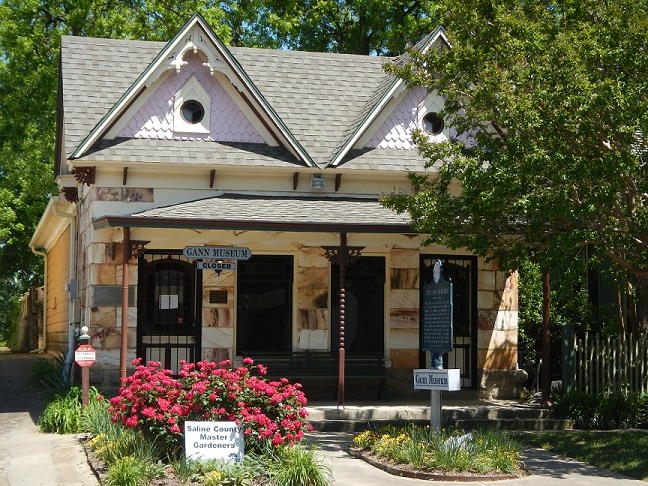

- Location within Arkansas Location within the United States
- Location: 218 S. Market St., Benton, Arkansas
- Coordinates: 34°33′41″N 92°35′16″W
- Area: less than one acre
- Built: 1893
- NRHP reference No.: 75000415
- Added to NRHP: October 21, 1975

The Gann Building is a historic building located at 218 S. Market St. in Benton, Arkansas. The building, which was built in 1893, is the only known extant building to have been built out of bauxite.

The building was added to the National Register of Historic Places on October 21, 1975.

== History ==
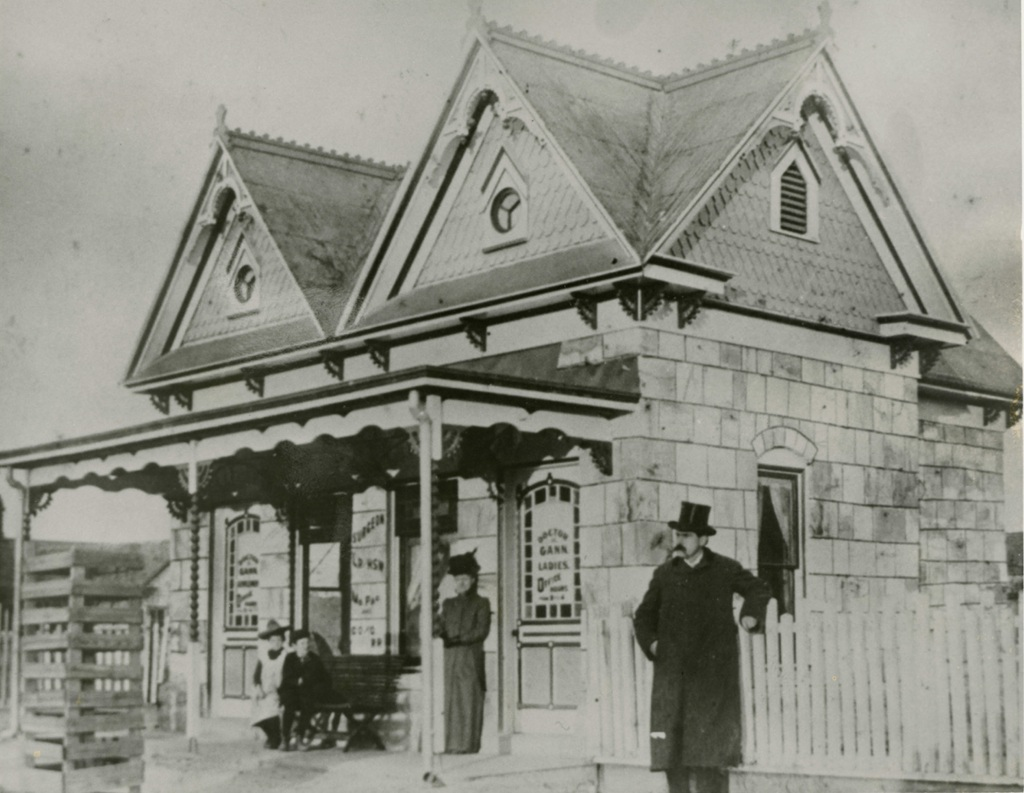
Photo of the Gann Building circa 1890s

Dewell Gann, Sr. was born March 31, 1859, in Atlanta, Georgia. He graduated from Emory University in 1886, after which he moved to Sheridan, Arkansas to begin practicing medicine with B. W. Mason. By 1889 Gann had married Martha Harding Whitthorn, and the couple moved to Benton the following year. Their only child, a son, Dewell Gann Jr., was born on September 14, 1890. He would follow in his father's footsteps by studying medicine at Indiana University, graduating in 1913. He returned to Arkansas to join his father's practice. After his office became successful, Gann Sr. helped establish the Saline County Medical Society. Gann Jr., was a successful physician as well and was named a Fellow of the Royal College of Surgeons of Edinburgh in 1925; an honor that had only been extended to less than ten other men in the United States at that time. Gann, Jr. also served in the medical corps during World War I.

Dr. Dewell Gann, Sr. built a three room building to house his medical office in 1893. Materials and labor were supplied by patients with no other means to pay for medical services. Dr. Dewell Gann, Jr. donated the building to the city of Benton in 1946 to serve as a library. At this time, the original slate roof was replaced with asphalt shingles, and a 25 ft by 45 ft concrete block addition was added to the rear to allow space for a reading room. The building was later converted into a museum in 1967.

== Architecture ==
The building is the only known example of bauxite construction, likely from nearby Bauxite, Arkansas. Gothic Revival and High Victorian styles are discernable throughout the distinctive features -- high gable roof decorated with wooden imbrication and brackets with pendants, ornately milled doors, and stained glass windows.

== See also ==
- National Register of Historic Places listings in Saline County, Arkansas
