= Independent Order of Odd Fellows Building (Benton, Arkansas) =

- U.S. National Register of Historic Places
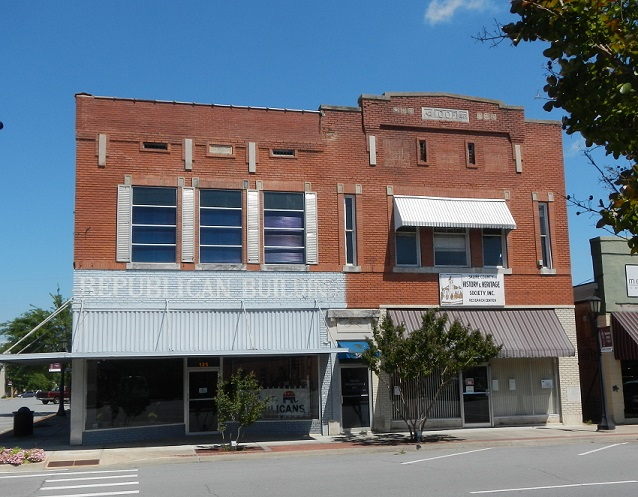

- Location within Arkansas Location within the United States
- Location: 123-125 North Market, Benton, Arkansas
- Coordinates: 34°33′58″N 92°35′16″W
- Area: less than one acre
- Built: 1913
- Architectural style: Early Commercial
- NRHP reference No.: 04000509
- Added to NRHP: May 26, 2004

The Independent Order of Odd Fellows Building, at 123-125 North Market in Benton, Arkansas, is a historic building that served as an Independent Order of Odd Fellows meeting hall. E. Y. Stinson built the building in 1913 on land purchased from Saline Odd Fellows Lodge No. 174; the Odd Fellows bought the building back the following year. The Odd Fellows used the second floor of the building as a meeting hall; the ground floor was sold to a hardware store, as Odd Fellows lodges were discouraged from meeting on the ground floor of a building. During its time in the building, the Odd Fellows Lodge included several prominent local businessmen and politicians as members, including a Saline County sheriff. The lodge was also responsible for hosting major Benton social events, such as Fourth of July picnics. The lodge's membership began to decline during World War II, and it sold the building in 1971.

It was listed on the National Register of Historic Places in 2004.
