= Saline County Courthouse (Arkansas) =

- U.S. National Register of Historic Places
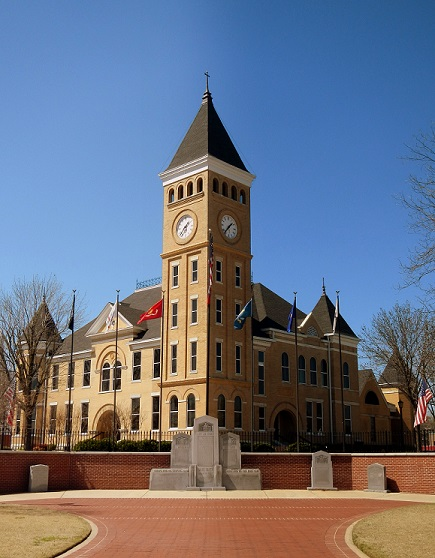
- Courthouse in 2012

- Location within Arkansas Location within the United States
- Location: Courthouse Square, Benton, Arkansas
- Coordinates: 34°33′53″N 92°35′15″W
- Built: 1901
- Architect: Charles L. Thompson
- Architectural style: Romanesque
- NRHP reference No.: 76000465
- Added to NRHP: November 22, 1976

The Saline County Courthouse in Benton, Arkansas is the county courthouse of Saline County, located at 200 N. Main St.

== History ==
In 1836, Arkansas Gazette editor William Woodruff donated 120 acres for Saline County’s first courthouse and the plat of Benton. A two-story brick courthouse was built in 1839 along with a log jail. Condemned in 1855, it was replaced in 1856 by a courthouse built partly from salvaged materials, which served until the early 1900s.

Starting construction in 1901, the courthouse was the third built in the county. Architect Charles L. Thompson designed the building in the Romanesque Revival style, an uncommon design choice in Arkansas. The two-story brick building features a four-story clock tower at one corner, smaller towers at the other three corners, dentillated cornices, and rounded arch entrances. Judge W. H. Evans commented on the continuing construction in October of 1902, remarking good progress was being made on the $31,000 project. By February of 1903, the contractor was reporting the project would be completed the following month. The courthouse has served as Saline County's seat of government since its construction.

Major renovations in 1939 added offices, record vaults, and one-story north and south wings; the north wing housed a jail and was expanded in 1983. After a new jail opened in 2007, the north wing was remodeled for county offices and storage, including IT, the coroner, appraisers, security, and parts of the circuit clerk’s office.

== In art ==
The building features a mural, The Bauxite Mine, painted in 1942 by San Antonio, Texas, artist Julius Woeltz. The building was listed on the National Register of Historic Places in 1976.

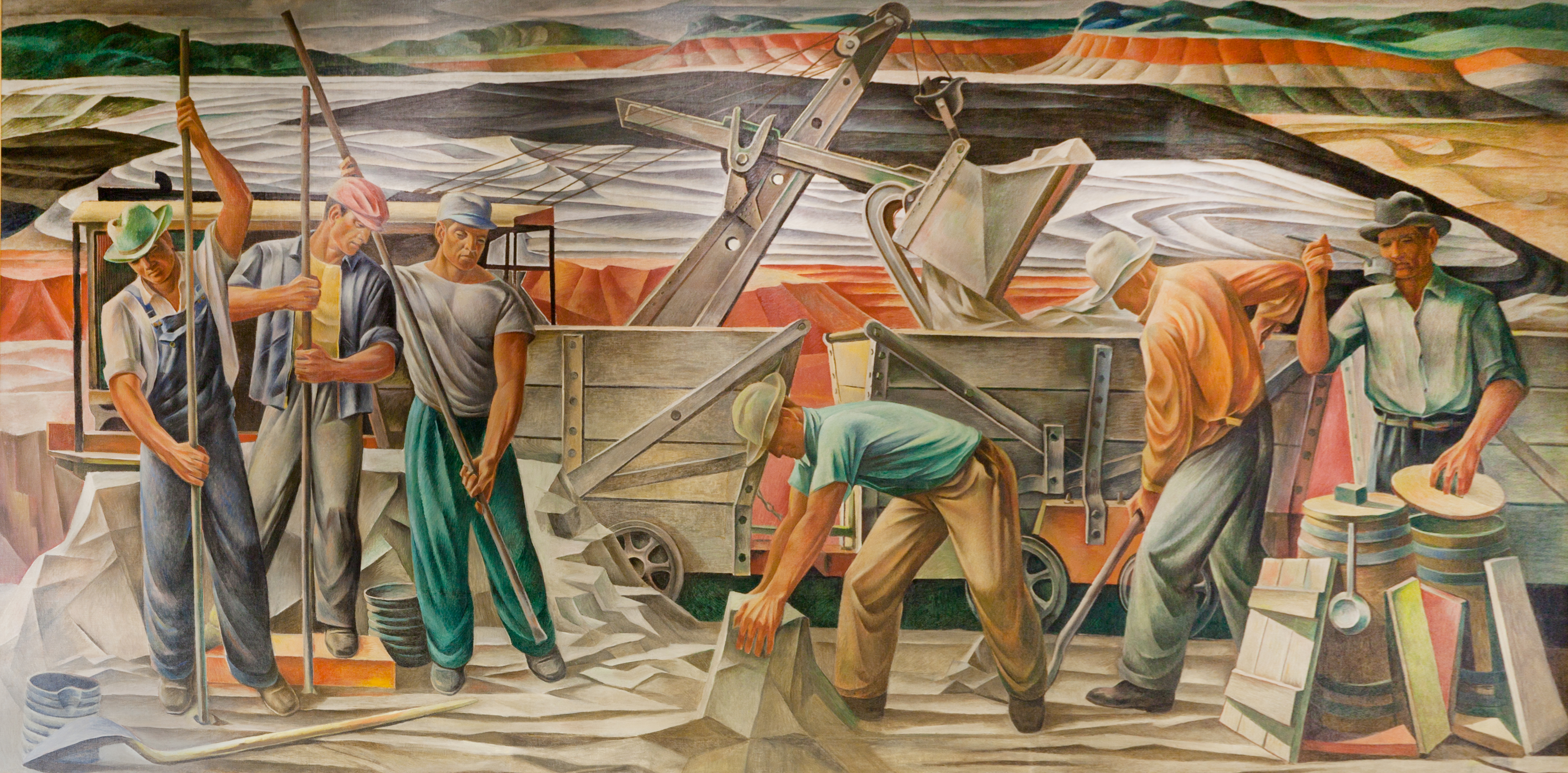
The Bauxite Mine

The Courthouse appeared in the 1973 film White Lightning, as filmmakers chose it for its quintessential Southern courthouse look.
