= Arkansas Highway 183 =

State highway in Arkansas, United States

Highway 183

Route information
- Maintained by ArDOT
- Length: 8.8 mi (14.2 km)

Major junctions
- South end: AR 35 in Benton
- North end: AR 5 in Bryant

Location
- Country: United States
- State: Arkansas
- Counties: Saline

Highway system
- Arkansas Highway System; Interstate; US; State; Business; Spurs; Suffixed; Scenic; Heritage
← AR 182	→ AR 184

Arkansas Highway 183 (AR 183, Ark. 183, and Hwy. 183) is a designation for a state highway in the U.S. state of Arkansas. The route begins at Highway 35 in Benton, and ends at Highway 5 in Bryant.

== Route description ==
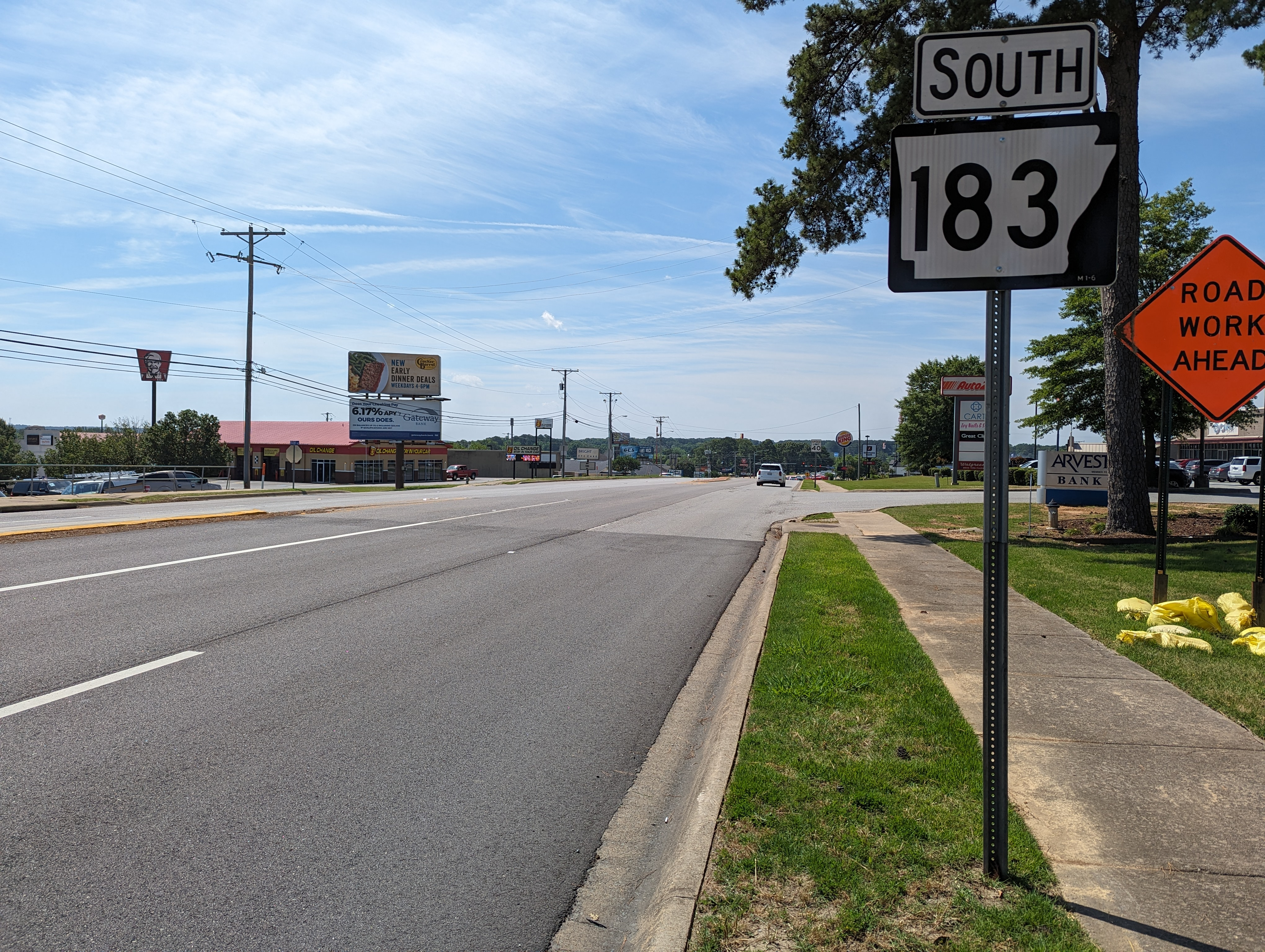
AR 183 at its northern terminus at AR 5 in Bryant, Arkansas.

The southern terminus for AR 183 begins at AR 35 in Benton. The route heads almost directly west, and travels through the town of Bauxite, before turning towards the north. The route travels through downtown Bryant, and intersects I-30 shortly after. Just past I-30, AR 183 reaches its northern terminus at AR 5. AR 183 is about 8.8 miles (14.2 km) long, and it is a primary road through the towns of Bauxite and Bryant.

== Major intersections ==
The entire route is in Saline County.

Location	mi	km	Destinations	Notes
Benton	0.0	0.0	AR 35 – Benton, Sheridan	Southern terminus
Bryant	8.4	13.5	I-30 (US 67 / US 70) – Little Rock, Texarkana	Exit 123 on I-30
Bryant	8.8	14.2	AR 5 – Benton, Little Rock	Northern terminus; former US 67/US 70
1.000 mi = 1.609 km; 1.000 km = 0.621 mi
