= Bauxite, Arkansas =

- City
- Location of Bauxite in Saline County, Arkansas.
- Coordinates: 34°33′20″N 92°31′17″W
- Country: United States
- State: Arkansas
- County: Saline

Area
  - Total: 3.13 sq mi (8.10 km^{2})
  - Land: 3.05 sq mi (7.89 km^{2})
  - Water: 0.085 sq mi (0.22 km^{2})
- Elevation: 344 ft (105 m)

Population (2020)
  - Total: 629
  - Estimate (2025): 811 ▲
  - Density: 206.6/sq mi (79.77/km^{2})
- Time zone: UTC-6 (Central (CST))
  - Summer (DST): UTC-5 (CDT)
- ZIP code: 72011
- Area code: 501
- FIPS code: 05-04090
- Website: townofbauxite.wordpress.com

Bauxite is a city in Saline County, Arkansas, United States. Located within Central Arkansas, the city is named for bauxite, the source ore for aluminum, which was found in abundant quantities in the area and became a source of aluminium refining. The city's population boomed during expanded aluminium production during World War II and shrank rapidly with output of the ore. Bauxite was incorporated as a town in 1973. The population was 629 at the 2020 census.

== History ==
The ore for which the city is named was discovered in the area in the early 1890s and mined by the General Bauxite Company until 1905, when the Pittsburgh Reduction Company, an aluminum refining company, purchased vast tracts of land in Saline County after learning of the high-quality ore that was being shipped from the area. The company bought out the local producers of the ore, including the General Bauxite Company. Pittsburgh Reduction would go on to incorporate as the Aluminum Company of America, or ALCOA.

Production of the ore rose rapidly, growing from 200,000 short tons (180,000 t) in 1914 during World War I, to 560,000 short tons (510,000 t) by war's end in 1918. With decreased demand and an expanded source base in South America, Arkansas production levels fluctuated with demand, dropping as low as 60,000 short tons (54,000 t) per annum in the mid-1930s.

World War I provided the greatest surge in growth for Bauxite, with multiple camps developing in and around the present-day city, often segregated by race or ethnicity, with such camp names as Italy Camp, Mexico Camp, Africa Camp, etc. Throughout the Great Depression, ALCOA provided a standard of living for its employees that was generally un-matched during that period of economic turbulence.

When World War II broke out, Bauxite was again called into martial action, with production rapidly increasing with the need for refined aluminum to produce airplanes and other material. Donald M. Nelson, the Chairman of the WPA, requested that ALCOA president, Arthur V. Davis implement a three-shift, 24-hour production schedule. Davis brought in miners from across the country to keep the mines running continuously. This rapid rise in output led to a 1943 annual production of 6,000,000 short tons (5,400,000 t) of ore.

Production began to slow as the war drew to a close, but the city's population and infrastructure had swelled to include multiple new communities and a larger school district. ALCOA and Reynolds Metal Company continued to refine bauxite in the area, with Reynolds finally ceasing operations in 1981.

== Geography ==
Bauxite is located in Saline County in south central Arkansas. Situated along Arkansas Highway 183 which also runs through Benton and Bryant, Bauxite is bordered on that path by Benton to the west and Bryant to the north. The city is 14 miles southwest of Little Rock. According to the United States Census Bureau, the town has a total area of 2.5 square miles (6.5 km^{2}), of which 2.4 square miles (6.2 km^{2}) is land and 0.1 square miles (0.26 km^{2}) (2.45%) is water.

== Demographics ==
Historical population
Census	Pop.	Note	%±
1980	433		—
1990	412		−4.8%
2000	432		4.9%
2010	487		12.7%
2020	629		29.2%
2025 (est.)	811	▲	28.9%
U.S. Decennial Census; 2018 Estimate

=== 2020 census ===
Bauxite racial composition
Race	Number	Percentage
White (non-Hispanic)	543	86.33%
Black or African American (non-Hispanic)	33	5.25%
Native American	5	0.79%
Asian	5	0.79%
Pacific Islander	1	0.16%
Other/Mixed	24	3.82%
Hispanic or Latino	18	2.86%

As of the 2020 United States census, there were 629 people, 214 households, and 173 families residing in the town.

=== 2000 census ===
As of the census of 2000, there were 432 people, 161 households, and 127 families residing in the town. The population density was 180.6 inhabitants per square mile (69.7/km^{2}). There were 171 housing units at an average density of 71.5 per square mile (27.6/km^{2}). The racial makeup of the city was 97.45% White, 0.69% Native American, 0.23% Asian, and 1.62% from two or more races. 2.31% of the population were Hispanic or Latino of any race.

There were 161 households, out of which 37.3% had children under the age of 18 living with them, 62.1% were married couples living together, 14.3% had a female householder with no husband present, and 20.5% were non-families. 17.4% of all households were made up of individuals, and 10.6% had someone living alone who was 65 years of age or older. The average household size was 2.68 and the average family size was 3.05.

In the city, the population was spread out, with 25.9% under the age of 18, 7.6% from 18 to 24, 29.2% from 25 to 44, 24.8% from 45 to 64, and 12.5% who were 65 years of age or older. The median age was 37 years. For every 100 females, there were 94.6 males. For every 100 females age 18 and over, there were 92.8 males.

The median income for a household in the city was $35,347, and the median income for a family was $37,153. Males had a median income of $28,500 versus $24,167 for females. The per capita income for the city was $14,406. About 8.5% of families and 11.0% of the population were below the poverty line, including 15.4% of those under age 18 and 11.3% of those age 65 or over.

== Arts and culture ==
In 1926, ALCOA built a community center in traditional Colonial style to serve as a boarding house and gathering place for the mining community in the town. The structure still stands, and houses the Bauxite Museum, an informal collection of photographs, documents, and mining equipment from the mining era. In 2008, the museum erected "Unsung Heroes," a life-size series of bronze statues sculpted by Gary Alsum at the property's corner. The sculptures depict a traditional mining family, with a man preparing to leave for work at the bauxite mines. The community center is available to the general public for rental and event usage.

As with many cities and towns in Arkansas, football is important in the Bauxite community as both a social event and source of pride for the city's identity. Bauxite High School has a storied football program which began around 1920. The Bauxite Miners football team won 24 conference championships, appeared in two state title games and won the state championship in 1996. Bauxite has produced many standout players throughout its history. George Cole, (1920-1923) who went on to coach and become athletic director at the University of Arkansas, and Leon "Muscles" Campbell (1943-1945) who played for the NFL's Baltimore Colts, Chicago Bears, and Pittsburgh Steelers, both played at Bauxite.

In recent history, head football coach Jon Watson led the Miners for nearly two decades before retiring in 2010. During his coaching career with Bauxite, which lasted from 1990 until his retirement, he compiled a 177-55-1 record. Watson now ranks seventh overall in victories for high school football coaches in Arkansas. The program currently plays in the 7-4A conference of the Arkansas Activities Association.

== Government ==
Bauxite operates under a city council system with a mayor as the presiding executive officer. The current (as of April 6, 2021) mayor is Eddie Jones. Other elected officials include treasurer Renee Chastain, and council members Ron Parsons, John Davis, Ron Ramsey, Deann Watson, and John Simpson.

== Politics ==
As a part of rural Saline County and a bedroom community to Little Rock, Bauxite has an often convoluted political dynamic. Previously represented by Democratic State Senator Shane Broadway and Representative Dawn Creekmoore, in the 2010 election cycle, Bauxite's representation switched to all-Republican with the election of former State Representative Jeremy Hutchinson and Andy Mayberry to the State Senate and House, respectively. In the Bauxite city precinct, Creekmore narrowly lost to Hutchinson 51%-49%, while Mayberry beat his Democratic challenger by a 76% to 24% margin. Democrats Governor Mike Beebe (who was running for re-election) and Broadway, who was running for Lieutenant Governor of the state, each won by at least 20 percentage points in the city during the 2010 election.

=== Legislative Delegation ===
District	Name	Party
State Representative, District 27	Julie Mayberry	GOP
State Senator, District 33	Jeremy Hutchinson	GOP
United States Congress, District 2	French Hill	GOP

== Education ==
Bauxite has three public schools, which belong to the Bauxite School District, an independent school district which was subject to consolidation under Governor Mike Huckabee's school consolidation plan, but managed to maintain its autonomy after a public outcry from the community. The school district consists of:

- Pine Haven Elementary, located in the old Pine Haven community established during World War II
- Bauxite Middle School
- Bauxite High School, built in 2001, replacing a Depression-era Works Progress Administration-built school that was destroyed by fire in January of that year

A small portion of the city is in the Bryant School District, which operates Bryant High School.

== Notable people ==
- George W. Bond, president of Louisiana Tech University from 1928 to 1936.
- Leon Campbell, star fullback at the University of Arkansas
- George Cole, University of Arkansas head football coach
- Susan Dunn, Grammy Award-winning operatic soprano
- Robert M. Utley, author and historian
