= Benton, Arkansas =

- City
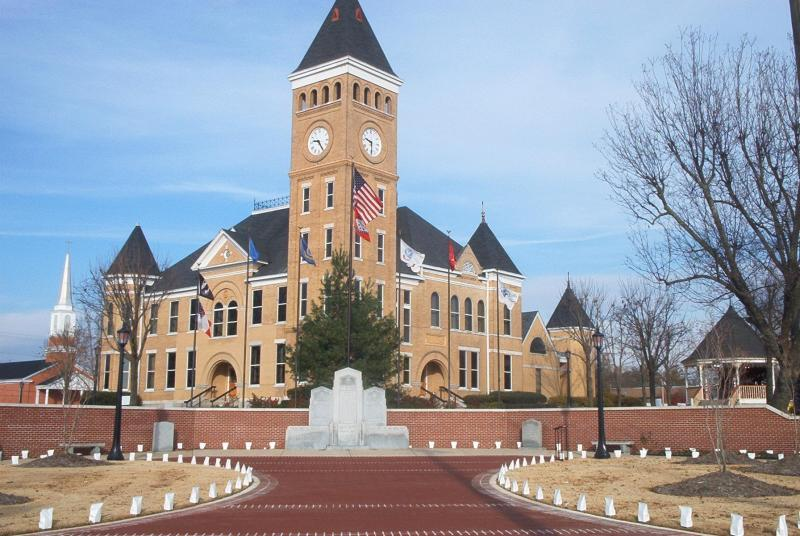
- Saline County Courthouse, located in the heart of downtown Benton.

- Flag Logo

- Location in Saline County and the state of Arkansas

- Location in the United States
- Coordinates: 34°34′45″N 92°34′17″W
- Country: United States
- State: Arkansas
- County: Saline

Government
  - Type: Mayor-Council
  - Mayor: Tom Farmer
  - City Council: Frank Baptist; Kerry Murphy; Charles Cunningham; Joe Lee Richards; Bill Donnor; Jerry Ponder; Brad Moore; James Herzfeld; Steve Lee; Lori Terrell

Area
  - Total: 23.42 sq mi (60.65 km^{2})
  - Land: 22.88 sq mi (59.27 km^{2})
  - Water: 0.54 sq mi (1.39 km^{2})
- Elevation: 472 ft (144 m)

Population (2020)
  - Total: 35,014
  - Estimate (2025): 38,898 ▲
  - Density: 1,530.1/sq mi (590.77/km^{2})
- Time zone: UTC-6 (Central (CST))
  - Summer (DST): UTC-5 (CDT)
- ZIP code: 72015, 72018-19, 72158
- Area code: 501
- FIPS code: 05-05290
- GNIS feature ID: 2403855
- Website: www.bentonar.gov

Benton is a city in and the county seat of Saline County, Arkansas, United States. A suburb of Little Rock, it was established in 1837. At the 2020 census, the city had a population of 35,014, making it the 12th most populous city in Arkansas. It is part of the Little Rock-North Little Rock-Conway metropolitan area. The city of Benton, first settled in 1833 and named after Missouri Senator Thomas Hart Benton, was formally chartered in 1836 when Arkansas became a state.

== History ==
Early industry in Benton included a salt works opened in 1827, pottery making from local deposits of kaolin beginning around 1900, and logging and furniture making from surrounding timber. It had a racetrack preceding Oaklawn as early as 1838.

== Geography ==
According to the United States Census Bureau, the city has a total area of 18.4 square miles (48 km^{2}), of which 17.9 square miles (46 km^{2}) is land and 0.5 square miles (1.3 km^{2}) (2.71%) is water.

=== Climate ===
The climate in this area is characterized by hot, humid summers and generally mild to cool winters. According to the Köppen Climate Classification system, Benton has a humid subtropical climate, abbreviated "Cfa" on climate maps.

Climate data for Benton, Arkansas (1991–2020 normals, extremes 1907–1913, 1937–present)
Month	Jan	Feb	Mar	Apr	May	Jun	Jul	Aug	Sep	Oct	Nov	Dec	Year
Record high °F (°C)	83 (28)	97 (36)	91 (33)	95 (35)	100 (38)	104 (40)	112 (44)	111 (44)	106 (41)	98 (37)	86 (30)	80 (27)	112 (44)
Mean maximum °F (°C)	71.2 (21.8)	74.6 (23.7)	81.9 (27.7)	85.8 (29.9)	90.6 (32.6)	95.4 (35.2)	99.4 (37.4)	99.9 (37.7)	95.9 (35.5)	89.3 (31.8)	79.4 (26.3)	73.4 (23.0)	101.3 (38.5)
Mean daily maximum °F (°C)	52.5 (11.4)	57.1 (13.9)	65.7 (18.7)	74.5 (23.6)	81.6 (27.6)	89.0 (31.7)	92.9 (33.8)	92.6 (33.7)	86.7 (30.4)	76.0 (24.4)	64.1 (17.8)	54.8 (12.7)	74.0 (23.3)
Daily mean °F (°C)	41.6 (5.3)	45.7 (7.6)	53.6 (12.0)	62.2 (16.8)	70.6 (21.4)	78.8 (26.0)	82.6 (28.1)	81.7 (27.6)	74.8 (23.8)	63.5 (17.5)	52.2 (11.2)	44.0 (6.7)	62.6 (17.0)
Mean daily minimum °F (°C)	30.6 (−0.8)	34.3 (1.3)	41.4 (5.2)	49.9 (9.9)	59.6 (15.3)	68.6 (20.3)	72.3 (22.4)	70.8 (21.6)	62.8 (17.1)	51.0 (10.6)	40.3 (4.6)	33.2 (0.7)	51.2 (10.7)
Mean minimum °F (°C)	15.9 (−8.9)	20.1 (−6.6)	24.8 (−4.0)	35.3 (1.8)	44.5 (6.9)	57.9 (14.4)	63.7 (17.6)	61.4 (16.3)	48.9 (9.4)	35.1 (1.7)	24.7 (−4.1)	19.6 (−6.9)	12.6 (−10.8)
Record low °F (°C)	−12 (−24)	−17 (−27)	6 (−14)	23 (−5)	31 (−1)	44 (7)	50 (10)	46 (8)	31 (−1)	20 (−7)	7 (−14)	−2 (−19)	−17 (−27)
Average precipitation inches (mm)	3.84 (98)	4.20 (107)	5.05 (128)	5.63 (143)	5.22 (133)	3.94 (100)	4.16 (106)	3.52 (89)	3.80 (97)	4.37 (111)	4.77 (121)	4.91 (125)	53.41 (1,357)
Average snowfall inches (cm)	0.6 (1.5)	0.4 (1.0)	0.3 (0.76)	0.0 (0.0)	0.0 (0.0)	0.0 (0.0)	0.0 (0.0)	0.0 (0.0)	0.0 (0.0)	0.0 (0.0)	0.0 (0.0)	0.0 (0.0)	1.3 (3.3)
Average precipitation days (≥ 0.01 in)	6.2	6.1	7.0	7.6	7.7	5.3	6.0	5.0	4.8	5.9	6.2	6.4	74.2
Average snowy days (≥ 0.1 in)	0.2	0.2	0.1	0.0	0.0	0.0	0.0	0.0	0.0	0.0	0.0	0.0	0.5
Source: NOAA

== Demographics ==
Historical population
Census	Pop.	Note	%±
1880	452		—
1890	647		43.1%
1900	1,025		58.4%
1910	1,708		66.6%
1920	2,933		71.7%
1930	3,445		17.5%
1940	3,502		1.7%
1950	6,277		79.2%
1960	10,399		65.7%
1970	16,499		58.7%
1980	17,717		7.4%
1990	18,177		2.6%
2000	21,906		20.5%
2010	30,681		40.1%
2020	35,014		14.1%
2025 (est.)	38,898	▲	11.1%
U.S. Decennial Census

=== 2020 census ===
As of the 2020 census, Benton had a population of 35,014. The median age was 36.8 years. 25.9% of residents were under the age of 18 and 15.5% of residents were 65 years of age or older. For every 100 females there were 90.8 males, and for every 100 females age 18 and over there were 87.3 males age 18 and over.

99.3% of residents lived in urban areas, while 0.7% lived in rural areas.

There were 13,737 households in Benton, of which 8,913 were families and 35.7% had children under the age of 18 living in them. Of all households, 48.4% were married-couple households, 15.8% were households with a male householder and no spouse or partner present, and 29.7% were households with a female householder and no spouse or partner present. About 26.9% of all households were made up of individuals and 10.9% had someone living alone who was 65 years of age or older.

There were 14,785 housing units, of which 7.1% were vacant. The homeowner vacancy rate was 2.0% and the rental vacancy rate was 7.9%.

Racial composition as of the 2020 census
Race	Number	Percent
White	27,601	78.8%
Black or African American	3,446	9.8%
American Indian and Alaska Native	227	0.6%
Asian	494	1.4%
Native Hawaiian and Other Pacific Islander	12	0.0%
Some other race	984	2.8%
Two or more races	2,250	6.4%
Hispanic or Latino (of any race)	2,030	5.8%

=== 2000 census ===
At the 2000 census there were 21,906 people in 8,713 households, including 6,186 families, in the city. The population density was 1,221.2 inhabitants per square mile (471.5/km^{2}). There were 9,315 housing units at an average density of 519.3 per square mile (200.5/km^{2}). The racial makeup of the city was 92.81% White, 4.46% Black or African American, 0.39% Native American, 0.56% Asian, 0.05% Pacific Islander, 0.75% from other races, and 1.19% from two or more races. 1.90% of the population were Hispanic or Latino of any race. Of the 8,713 households 33.5% had children under the age of 18 living with them, 55.9% were married couples living together, 11.8% had a female householder with no husband present, and 29.0% were non-families. The average household size was 2.46 and the average family size was 2.95.

The age distribution was 25.3% under the age of 18, 8.8% from 18 to 24, 29.8% from 25 to 44, 21.5% from 45 to 64, and 14.7% 65 or older. The median age was 36 years. For every 100 females, there were 91.5 males. For every 100 females age 18 and over, there were 88.1 males.

The median household income was $41,503 and the median family income was $51,064. Males had a median income of $32,493 versus $22,386 for females. The per capita income for the city was $19,797. About 5.8% of families and 8.6% of the population were below the poverty line, including 9.9% of those under age 18 and 11.5% of those age 65 or over.

== Education ==
Public education for early childhood, elementary and secondary students is provided by:

- Benton School District, which leads to graduation from Benton High School (majority of the city)
- Bryant Public Schools, which operates Bryant High School
- Bauxite School District

A small area near Frontage Road to the southeast is physically in the Harmony Grove School District, which operates Benton Harmony Grove High School.

== Notable people ==
- Ann Clemmer – Republican former member of the Arkansas House of Representatives
- Lanny Fite – Ann Clemmer's successor in the state House District 23; former Saline County county judge
- Wes Gardner – Former relief pitcher for the New York Mets, Boston Red Sox, and others
- Stuart Greer – film and television actor, is a part-time resident
- Kim Hammer – Republican member of the Arkansas House of Representatives from District 28 in Saline County
- Kenneth Henderson – Republican member of the Arkansas House for Pope County; former Benton resident
- Cole Jester – Republican politician
- Cliff Lee – Major League Baseball's 2008 American League Cy Young Award winner for the Cleveland Indians
- Ewell Ross McCright – World War II POW
- Justin Moore – country artist, born in nearby Poyen, currently resides in Benton
- Joe Purcell – Arkansas governor for six days in 1979; Democratic lieutenant governor and attorney general
- Charlie Rich – Multiple Grammy Award winning country artist
- Travis Wood – Major League Baseball Player, MLB 2013 All-Star, born in nearby Little Rock, currently resides in Benton.
