= List of United States tornadoes from March to April 2008 =

== March ==
Confirmed tornadoes by Enhanced Fujita rating
EFU	EF0	EF1	EF2	EF3	EF4	EF5	Total
0	58	44	22	3	0	0	127

=== March 2 event ===
List of confirmed tornadoes – Sunday, March 2, 2008 (Note: All dates are based on the local time zone where the tornado touched down; however, all times are in Coordinated Universal Time for consistency.)
EF#	Location	County / Parish	State	Start Coord.	Time (UTC)	Path length	Max width	Damage (Note: All damage totals are in 2008 USD unless otherwise stated.)	Summary
EF0	N of Eagle City	Blaine	OK	35.9879°N 98.59°W	2246–2249	1 mi (1.6 km)	50 yd (46 m)	$0	Local media reported a tornado.
EF0	SE of Milan	Sumner	KS	37.23°N 97.67°W	2305–2307	0.8 mi (1.3 km)	75 yd (69 m)	$0	The public reported a tornado touchdown in an open field.

=== March 3 event ===
List of confirmed tornadoes – Monday, March 3, 2008
EF#	Location	County / Parish	State	Start Coord.	Time (UTC)	Path length	Max width	Damage	Summary
EF1	SE of Van	Van Zandt	TX	32.4008°N 95.5914°W	1236–1238	1.38 mi (2.22 km)	40 yd (37 m)	$50,000	A sturdy dwelling lost its door and windows. A nearby garage had its doors removed, and numerous trees were damaged (some of them snapped).
EF1	Red River Army Depot	Bowie	TX	33.4405°N 94.4064°W	1413–1420	5 mi (8.0 km)	75 yd (69 m)	$750,000	Trees were downed or snapped; trees fell on a house. An outbuilding was destroyed, a security guard shelter was pushed over, and several campers were damaged or destroyed. A portion of the camper sales store was damaged.
EF0	SSE of Ashdown	Little River	AR	33.6115°N 94.131°W	1427–1430	3 mi (4.8 km)	100 yd (91 m)	$20,000	A metal building, some farm equipment, and trees were damaged.
EF0	Tollette	Howard	AR	33.7961°N 93.9616°W	1446–1450	7.5 mi (12.1 km)	100 yd (91 m)	$200,000	Several buildings, a baseball field, and a chicken house were damaged. Several houses sustained roof damage.
EF1	E of Liberty	Amite	MS	31.17°N 90.7793°W	2150–2154	1.5 mi (2.4 km)	250 yd (230 m)	$150,000	Several large trees were downed and uprooted, several houses suffered extensive roof damage, and several trailers were damaged.
EF0	ESE of Cary	Sharkey	MS	32.7766°N 90.8672°W	2317–2318	0.95 mi (1.53 km)	50 yd (46 m)	$0	A trained storm spotter reported a brief tornado.
EF2	NW of Holly Bluff	Sharkey	MS	32.8542°N 90.7862°W	2325–2334	6.95 mi (11.18 km)	440 yd (400 m)	$402,000	A strong tornado snapped or uprooted a few thousand trees. A hunting camp sustained minor damage.
EF1	S of Mendenhall	Simpson	MS	31.9235°N 89.8879°W	0301–0302	0.41 mi (0.66 km)	75 yd (69 m)	$35,000	Numerous pine trees were snapped or uprooted, and one home sustained minor roof damage.
EF1	E of Mendenhall	Simpson	MS	31.956°N 89.7666°W	0310–0312	1.87 mi (3.01 km)	150 yd (140 m)	$300,000	A large shed was destroyed, power lines were downed, and a trampoline was thrown and severely damaged. Several trees were snapped or uprooted.
EF1	SW of Foxworth	Marion	MS	31.17°N 89.92°W	0325–0326	0.57 mi (0.92 km)	50 yd (46 m)	$275,000	A livestock barn was severely damaged, a roof was blown off an outbuilding, a trampoline was tossed into a pond, and numerous hardwood trees were snapped or uprooted. A cow was killed.
EF1	SE of Forest	Scott	MS	32.231°N 89.4181°W	0343–0345	2.15 mi (3.46 km)	100 yd (91 m)	$5,000	Numerous trees were downed.
EF1	E of Forest	Scott, Newton	MS	32.308°N 89.3532°W	0349–0354	4.02 mi (6.47 km)	175 yd (160 m)	$1,200,000	Numerous trees were downed. Several homes suffered roof damage, three large grain bins were destroyed, two railroad light standards were bent, two cinder block buildings were nearly destroyed, and a mobile home was destroyed by a fallen tree. A highway sign was downed.
EF0	WSW of Porterville	Kemper	MS	32.65°N 88.57°W	0449–0450	1.32 mi (2.12 km)	30 yd (27 m)	$55,000	A shed was destroyed, a fence was flattened, a church steeple was damaged, and several trees were downed or uprooted.
EF1	Camp Shelby	Forrest	MS	31.1989°N 89.2265°W	0512–0513	1.09 mi (1.75 km)	100 yd (91 m)	$1,500,000	Numerous trees were snapped or uprooted. Twelve buildings (mostly barracks) were damaged, a hummer was overturned, and the windows were blown out vehicles. Fourteen people were injured.
EF2	S of Quitman	Clarke	MS	31.86°N 88.77°W	0520–0530	8.34 mi (13.42 km)	350 yd (320 m)	$900,000	A large two-story frame house was moved several feet off its foundation, with its windows blown out and roof damaged. Hundreds of trees were snapped or uprooted. Two other homes sustained roof damage.

=== March 4 event ===
List of confirmed tornadoes – Tuesday, March 4, 2008
EF#	Location	County / Parish	State	Start Coord.	Time (UTC)	Path length	Max width	Damage	Summary
EF1	Eutaw	Greene	AL	32.8316°N 87.9191°W	0649–0655	5.62 mi (9.04 km)	300 yd (270 m)	$150,000	Approximately 25 houses were affected: 20 sustained minor damage, 4 sustained major damage, and 1 was destroyed. Several hundred trees were snapped or downed.
EF1	WNW of Samantha	Tuscaloosa	AL	33.4475°N 87.671°W	0650–0651	0.79 mi (1.27 km)	200 yd (180 m)	$50,000	At least one home sustained significant damage and six others were damaged. Several hundred trees were snapped or downed; one vehicle was severely damaged by a fallen tree.
EF1	E of Prosperity	Newberry	SC	34.1898°N 81.5176°W	2123–2127	2.69 mi (4.33 km)	60 yd (55 m)	$0	Many trees were downed.
EF0	NE of Great Falls	Lancaster	SC	34.6°N 80.83°W	2142–2145	1.49 mi (2.40 km)	40 yd (37 m)	$0	Trees were downed.
EF0	NNE of Burlington	Alamance, Caswell	NC	36.22°N 79.38°W	2154–2202	2.8 mi (4.5 km)	100 yd (91 m)	$2,150,000	The roof was blown off a tobacco barn, a carport was lifted, a shed was destroyed, and downed numerous trees. A tractor and an irrigation system were damaged, a barn was destroyed, and a few homes sustained roof or structural damage (an associated garage to one home was destroyed).
EF1	Big Stone Gap	Wise	VA	36.86°N 82.78°W	2155–2157	1 mi (1.6 km)	300 yd (270 m)	$1,800,000	Approximately 46 homes were impacted: 25 sustained minor damage, 15 sustained major damage, and 6 were destroyed. Large trees were downed. Two injuries were reported.
EF0	NW of Williston	Aiken	SC	33.42°N 81.7°W	0019–0031	20.06 mi (32.28 km)	60 yd (55 m)	Unknown	Trees and power lines were downed.
EF0	NE of Mocksville	Davie	NC	35.9249°N 80.4957°W	0117	0.5 mi (0.80 km)	25 yd (23 m)	$15,000	A mobile home and surrounding outbuildings were damaged. Trees were downed.
EF0	SE of Enfield	Halifax	NC	36.1411°N 77.6012°W	0150–0151	0.66 mi (1.06 km)	75 yd (69 m)	$200,000	A home lost some of its shingles, and numerous trees were damaged or downed.

=== March 6 event ===
List of confirmed tornadoes – Thursday, March 6, 2008
EF#	Location	County / Parish	State	Start Coord.	Time (UTC)	Path length	Max width	Damage	Summary
EF1	N of Gardendale	Nueces	TX	27.7321°N 97.3825°W	2058–2059	0.13 mi (0.21 km)	70 yd (64 m)	$20,000	Sporadic damage to homes and trees occurred.

=== March 7 event ===
List of confirmed tornadoes – Friday, March 7, 2008
EF#	Location	County / Parish	State	Start Coord.	Time (UTC)	Path length	Max width	Damage	Summary
EF1	ENE of Tallahassee	Leon	FL	30.4494°N 84.0912°W	1225–1230	4.6 mi (7.4 km)	150 yd (140 m)	$750,000	Eight homes were severely damaged, resulting in one injury. Several additional houses sustained lesser degrees of damage, and both trees and power lines were downed.
EF2	NW of Steinhatchee	Taylor	FL	29.828°N 83.5956°W	1336–1337	0.4 mi (0.64 km)	200 yd (180 m)	$500,000	A waterspout came ashore as a strong tornado. Fifteen homes sustained minor to moderate damage, and several decks associated with these houses failed. One home was blown off its foundation and thrown into the road. A few small boats were lofted, and trees and power lines were damaged. Two people were injured.
EF0	S of Wellborn	Suwannee	FL	30.1787°N 82.8258°W	1430	0.01 mi (0.016 km)	50 yd (46 m)	Unknown	Trees were downed; an old shed was blown into trees.
EF2	Lake City	Columbia	FL	30.1937°N 82.6458°W	1445–1500	1.49 mi (2.40 km)	800 yd (730 m)	$4,000,000	2 deaths – Numerous trees and power lines were snapped or downed. A total of 60 homes were impacted: 20 sustained minor damage, 21 suffered major damage, and 19 were completely destroyed. Two businesses were destroyed and an additional six sustained major damage. Five people were injured.
EF0	NNW of Macclenny	Baker	FL	30.4216°N 82.2323°W	1510–1520	1.16 mi (1.87 km)	100 yd (91 m)	Unknown	One residence was destroyed while another had its tin roof blown. One person was injured.
EF1	W of Darien	Wayne	GA	31.4069°N 81.6919°W	1520–1525	0.61 mi (0.98 km)	200 yd (180 m)	$11,000	Hundreds of trees were snapped and several garages were damaged.
EF1	N of Macclenny	Charlton	GA	30.46°N 82.2°W	1520–1525	5.51 mi (8.87 km)	100 yd (91 m)	Unknown	Five homes were damaged, including one severely. Numerous power lines were downed.
EF0	W of Waynesville	Brantley	GA	31.23°N 81.94°W	1527	0.01 mi (0.016 km)	50 yd (46 m)	Unknown	The public reported a brief tornado that damaged one home.
EF0	NNW of Kent	Nassau	FL	30.59°N 82.01°W	1530	0.01 mi (0.016 km)	100 yd (91 m)	$0	An outhouse sustained minor damage and trees were downed.
EF0	N of Darien	McIntosh	GA	31.58°N 81.37°W	1557	0.01 mi (0.016 km)	25 yd (23 m)	$0	Law enforcement reported two brief tornado touchdowns.
EF0	E of Kings Bay	Camden	GA	30.8099°N 81.4954°W	1630–1635	0.64 mi (1.03 km)	100 yd (91 m)	$0	A former NWS employee reported a waterspout/tornado.
EF1	E of Douglasville	Douglas	GA	33.688°N 84.7251°W	0025–0040	6.97 mi (11.22 km)	100 yd (91 m)	$2,000,000	A mobile home and a site-built house were destroyed; 10 homes sustained major damage and 52 suffered minor damage; 1 business sustained major damage while another sustained minor damage. A shed was destroyed, a trampoline was lofted, a fence and a basketball goal were downed, and several trees were snapped or uprooted. One person was injured.

=== March 10 event ===
List of confirmed tornadoes – Monday, March 10, 2008
EF#	Location	County / Parish	State	Start Coord.	Time (UTC)	Path length	Max width	Damage	Summary
EF0	W of Sinton	San Patricio	TX	28.0198°N 97.6461°W	1847–1848	0.34 mi (0.55 km)	100 yd (91 m)	$10,000	A new home had the east side of its metal roof blown off.
EF0	E of Edroy	San Patricio	TX	27.9656°N 97.6401°W	1921–1922	0.25 mi (0.40 km)	50 yd (46 m)	$0	A local television station videoed a brief tornado.

=== March 13 event ===
List of confirmed tornadoes – Thursday, March 13, 2008
EF#	Location	County / Parish	State	Start Coord.	Time (UTC)	Path length	Max width	Damage	Summary
EF0	ENE of Antlers	Pushmataha	OK	34.2614°N 95.3457°W	0336	0.1 mi (0.16 km)	50 yd (46 m)	$0	Storm chasers observed a brief tornado over open country.

=== March 14 event ===
List of confirmed tornadoes – Friday, March 14, 2008
EF#	Location	County / Parish	State	Start Coord.	Time (UTC)	Path length	Max width	Damage	Summary
EF2	N of Warren	Cleveland	AR	33.7201°N 92.1632°W	0842–0855	9.4 mi (15.1 km)	350 yd (320 m)	$1,000,000	An old, unoccupied house was destroyed. Several houses sustained roof and shingle damage, including two that had most of their roofs blown off. Several chicken houses were destroyed, and a number of barns and outbuildings were damaged. Hundreds of trees were downed; one destroyed a house trailer.
EF2	Atlanta	Fulton, DeKalb	GA	33.765°N 84.43°W	0138–0150	6.25 mi (10.06 km)	200 yd (180 m)	$25,050,000	1 death – See article on this tornado – 30 people were injured.

=== March 15 event ===
List of confirmed tornadoes – Saturday, March 15, 2008
EF#	Location	County / Parish	State	Start Coord.	Time (UTC)	Path length	Max width	Damage	Summary
EF2	SE of Oneonta	Blount	AL	33.8716°N 86.4459°W	1447–1457	6.04 mi (9.72 km)	675 yd (617 m)	$960,000	The Appalachian School property sustained damage, several hundred trees were snapped or uprooted, and many chicken houses were damaged or destroyed. Many garages, sheds, and outbuildings were destroyed. At least 25 homes sustained major damage while dozens more sustained lesser damage. A mobile home was destroyed and several others were damaged, a few feed silos were tipped over and rolled, and hundreds of livestock were killed by flying debris.
EF2	N of Piedmont	Cherokee	AL	33.9835°N 85.6295°W	1550–1554	3.61 mi (5.81 km)	50 yd (46 m)	$75,000	Metal roofing panels were torn from a barn, and half the roof was torn from a brick house. Two other homes and a barn also sustained structural damage. Numerous trees were snapped or uprooted.
EF3	NW of Aragon to W of Emerson	Polk, Floyd, Bartow	GA	34.09°N 85.11°W	1625–1645	16.93 mi (27.25 km)	880 yd (800 m)	$7,500,000	2 deaths – A significant tornado began in Polk County, affecting 16 houses; 4 were destroyed (killing an occupant), 2 sustained major damage, 5 sustained minor damage, and 5 sustained even lesser damage. Several county outbuildings, barns, shops, vehicles, a motor home, a travel trailer, a dog kennel business, and several fences were heavily damaged. Hundreds of trees and power lines were downed, including several high tension power line support structures that were heavily impacted. Another 20 homes were impacted in Floyd County, with 10 destroyed (killing an occupant) and 10 affected insignificantly. Approximately 55 homes were affected in Bartow County, of which 6 were destroyed and 30 sustained minor damage. Taylorsville Elementary and Woodland High School sustained major damage, and some Georgia Power high transmission towers were toppled.
EF0	S of Royston	Franklin, Hart	GA	34.273°N 83.176°W	1844–1851	3.24 mi (5.21 km)	20 yd (18 m)	$0	Trees and power lines were downed; a tree fell on a home.
EF0	NE of Abbeville	Abbeville	SC	34.2414°N 82.3058°W	1943	0.5 mi (0.80 km)	20 yd (18 m)	$0	Trees and power lines were downed.
EF1	NE of Winnsboro to SE of Kershaw	Fairfield, Kershaw	SC	34.45°N 80.97°W	2010–2039	24.22 mi (38.98 km)	80 yd (73 m)	$0	A long-tracked tornado snapped or uprooted numerous trees onto secondary roadways.
EF2	SSW of Calhoun Falls	Elbert	GA	34.0074°N 82.7341°W	2019–2030	8.04 mi (12.94 km)	100 yd (91 m)	$100,000	Numerous trees were snapped or uprooted, two homes sustained heavy roof damage, a boat dock was tossed 25 ft (8.3 yd), and power lines were downed.
EF3	Silverstreet to Prosperity to N of Chapin	Newberry, Richland	SC	34.23°N 81.76°W	2025–2047	27.51 mi (44.27 km)	1,320 yd (1,210 m)	$10,000	Many residences were heavily damaged, a few mobile homes sustained moderate damage, numerous trees were snapped or uprooted, and power lines were downed. Two people were injured.
EF1	SE of Calhoun Falls	Lincoln, McCormick	GA, SC	33.96°N 82.593°W	2028–2047	12.62 mi (20.31 km)	440 yd (400 m)	Unknown	Several mobile homes sustained minor to moderate damage, and numerous trees were downed.
EF2	W of Camden to NW of Bethune	Kershaw	SC	34.27°N 80.72°W	2030–2050	23.04 mi (37.08 km)	660 yd (600 m)	Unknown	Several homes and mobiles homes sustained moderate damage, mainly in the form of partially torn off roofs. A building on a poultry farm had its entire roof ripped off as well.
EF1	N of McBee	Chesterfield	SC	34.545°N 80.3°W	2047–2100	6.97 mi (11.22 km)	110 yd (100 m)	$25,000	A few mobile homes and a water tower sustained minor damage, while many trees and power lines were downed.
EF2	ENE of McCormick to SW of Monetta	McCormick, Edgefield, Saluda	SC	33.95°N 82.19°W	2102–2130	32.67 mi (52.58 km)	660 yd (600 m)	Unknown	Numerous trees and power lines were downed. One house and one mobile home were severely damaged, a second mobile home was split in two by a fallen tree, and several other houses and mobile homes sustained minor damage.
EF2	Elgin	Kershaw	SC	34.18°N 80.83°W	2122–2131	6.89 mi (11.09 km)	1,230 yd (1,120 m)	Unknown	Many houses had portions of its their roofs ripped off, four mobile homes were destroyed, and numerous trees and power lines were downed. Two people were injured.
EF0	Lugoff	Kershaw	SC	34.22°N 80.67°W	2133	0.5 mi (0.80 km)	100 yd (91 m)	Unknown	Several homes sustained minor damage, and trees were downed.
EF0	SE of Monetta	Aiken	SC	33.8183°N 81.581°W	2137–2138	0.5 mi (0.80 km)	100 yd (91 m)	$0	Trees were downed.
EF2	WNW of Pelion	Lexington	SC	33.8°N 81.385°W	2141–2154	8.33 mi (13.41 km)	440 yd (400 m)	Unknown	A mobile home was severely damaged, farm irrigation equipment was rolled and twisted, and numerous trees and power lines were downed. Several other mobile homes sustained lesser damage.
EF1	SE of Blythewood	Richland	SC	34.17°N 80.93°W	2143–2150	3.7 mi (6.0 km)	660 yd (600 m)	Unknown	A few homes had their roofs torn off while others only had portions removed. Numerous trees and power lines were downed.
EF0	S of Latta	Dillon	SC	34.3288°N 79.4366°W	2148–2150	1.36 mi (2.19 km)	75 yd (69 m)	$50,000	A large tree fell on a home; other trees were downed or damaged. Six homes sustained minor damage, and one trailer sustained major damage.
EF1	NE of Thomson	McDuffie, Columbia	GA	33.6°N 82.49°W	2148–2203	9.9 mi (15.9 km)	440 yd (400 m)	$140,000	One mobile home was destroyed and several others sustained moderate damage. Numerous trees and power lines were downed. Two people were injured.
EF2	NW of Woodford to St. Matthews to N of Elloree	Calhoun	SC	33.705°N 81.017°W	2210–2238	24.39 mi (39.25 km)	440 yd (400 m)	Unknown	Several mobile homes sustained severe damage while other houses had their roofs ripped off. Several outbuildings were damaged, a few barns collapsed, and numerous trees were downed.
EF0	NE of Evans	Edgefield	SC	33.57°N 82.04°W	2211–2213	3.74 mi (6.02 km)	220 yd (200 m)	$0	Several trees were downed.
EF0	SW of Jackson	Butts	GA	33.247°N 84.057°W	2215–2219	4.42 mi (7.11 km)	100 yd (91 m)	$150,000	A total of 136 homes sustained minor damage, a barn was destroyed, and many trees were downed.
EF2	Wrens to Matthews to N of Waynesboro	Jefferson, Burke	GA	33.2102°N 82.3922°W	2215–2245	22.07 mi (35.52 km)	880 yd (800 m)	$500,000	Several mobile homes were destroyed. Two businesses and a church were destroyed. Several other businesses, another church, and numerous homes were damaged. Numerous trees and power lines were downed.
EF0	Fair Bluff	Columbus	NC	34.3073°N 79.0373°W	2216–2217	0.02 mi (0.032 km)	10 yd (9.1 m)	Unknown	Several trees were snapped.
EF2	E of Augusta to W of Williston	Aiken, Barnwell	SC	33.49°N 81.9°W	2218–2248	25.51 mi (41.05 km)	1,760 yd (1,610 m)	Unknown	Many homes sustained extensive damage to their roofs and structures. A water tower had its top ripped off and deposited several hundred yards away.
EF1	S of Timmonsville	Florence	SC	34.0811°N 80.0108°W	2225–2240	13.45 mi (21.65 km)	100 yd (91 m)	$605,000	One house was destroyed while four others sustained major damage and seventy six others sustained minor damage. Nine mobile homes were completely destroyed, five mobile homes sustained major damage, and eight mobile homes sustained minor damage. Two businesses sustained major damage, thirteen barns and outbuildings were destroyed (and 3 others sustained major damage), and three people were injured.
EF2	N of Mayesville	Lee	SC	34.125°N 80.32°W	2252–2305	14.08 mi (22.66 km)	440 yd (400 m)	Unknown	Several houses, mobile homes, and a church sustained moderate to major damage. Numerous trees and power lines were downed.
EF0	E of Elko	Barnwell	SC	33.379°N 81.36°W	2254–2255	0.58 mi (0.93 km)	100 yd (91 m)	$0	Trees were downed in a convergent pattern.
EF1	S of Manning	Clarendon	SC	33.53°N 80.1°W	2258–2311	8.61 mi (13.86 km)	220 yd (200 m)	Unknown	Many trees and power lines were downed. A few homes sustained minor to moderate damage.
EF1	Denmark	Bamberg	SC	33.32°N 81.1327°W	2305–2307	1.96 mi (3.15 km)	220 yd (200 m)	Unknown	Utility poles were snapped, trees and power lines were downed, and several houses sustained moderate damage.
EF1	NE of Waynesboro to Girard to NE of Sardis	Burke	GA	33.1°N 81.9°W	2305–2315	15.23 mi (24.51 km)	440 yd (400 m)	$100,000	Numerous trees and power lines were downed. One home had its windows broken, siding severely damaged, and part of the roof ripped off. Several mobile homes sustained minor to moderate damage.
EF2	S of Martin to Allendale to NE of Fairfax	Allendale	SC	33.03°N 81.5°W	2312–2335	18 mi (29 km)	1,320 yd (1,210 m)	$2,300,000	Approximately 1,500 to 2,000 trees were snapped, two mobile homes were destroyed, a cell phone tower was toppled, and inflicted mainly minor roof damage to dozens of residences. Numerous power lines and power poles were downed, several barns, sheds, and outbuildings were destroyed, and an empty tractor trailer was overturned. One person was injured.
EF0	Aynor	Horry	SC	33.9943°N 79.2028°W	2313–2314	0.27 mi (0.43 km)	25 yd (23 m)	$5,000	A mobile home, trees, and power lines were damaged. A carport was destroyed.
EF1	S of Greeleyville	Williamsburg	SC	33.5375°N 80°W	2317–2320	2.49 mi (4.01 km)	75 yd (69 m)	Unknown	Numerous large hardwood trees were snapped or uprooted.
EF1	SE of Bamberg	Bamberg	SC	33.24°N 80.93°W	2325–2329	3.76 mi (6.05 km)	660 yd (600 m)	Unknown	Numerous trees were downed in a convergent path.
EF3	Branchville	Orangeburg	SC	33.24°N 80.865°W	2329–2344	10.11 mi (16.27 km)	1,320 yd (1,210 m)	$1,700,000 (2008 USD)	One residence was destroyed and sixteen others sustained minor to moderate damage. One mobile home was destroyed and six others sustained minor to moderate damage. Seven buildings were destroyed, including a couple of three-layer deep brick buildings; eighteen others sustained minor to major damage.
EF1	E of Lane	Williamsburg	SC	33.4923°N 79.7139°W	2336–2340	4.01 mi (6.45 km)	75 yd (69 m)	$200,000	Thirty-five homes were damaged, of which seven suffered major damage and five were completely destroyed.
EF0	NW of Georgetown	Georgetown	SC	33.4848°N 79.3726°W	2354–2355	0.01 mi (0.016 km)	25 yd (23 m)	Unknown	Eight trees were downed; one home sustained significant damage from a fallen tree, with its porch damaged and foundation shifted.
EF1	Hampstead	Pender	NC	34.3676°N 77.7145°W	2356–2359	1.99 mi (3.20 km)	100 yd (91 m)	$2,000,000	Eighteen homes were affected, of which fifteen sustained minor damage and three sustained major damage. Five mobile homes sustained minor damage while two sustained moderate damage. Ten businesses sustained minor damage, and an additional three sustained moderate damage. Trees were snapped.
EF1	N of Ridgeville	Dorchester	SC	33.11°N 80.32°W	0008–0011	2.2 mi (3.5 km)	40 yd (37 m)	$218,000	Roof panels were ripped from the canopy at Carters fast stop gas station, two mobile homes were damaged (with one shifted 5 ft (1.7 yd) off its foundation and the other having its windows and doors blown out), and a car was moved approximately 50 ft (17 yd).
EF1	N of Mount Holly	Berkeley	SC	33.06°N 80.03°W	0025–0026	0.6 mi (0.97 km)	180 yd (160 m)	$150,000	Two mobile homes sustained extensive damage, six mobile homes sustained moderate damage, and six mobile homes sustained minor damage. Large trees were snapped and uprooted. Seven people were injured.
EF1	ENE of Goose Creek	Berkeley	SC	33.05°N 79.85°W	0036–0038	1.2 mi (1.9 km)	135 yd (123 m)	$200,000	A large storage shed was severely damaged, several large trees were downed. Mount Zion Methodist Church sustained complete failure of its front porch and had a portion of the roof deck uplifted; its steeple was toppled and portions of the outer brick wall sustained severe damage as well.
EF2	NE of Springfield	Effingham	GA	32.39°N 81.31°W	0134–0143	7 mi (11 km)	440 yd (400 m)	$1,500,000	Three mobile homes were destroyed, three to four dozen residences were damaged, and fifteen high voltage transmission towers were toppled. Twenty vehicles were damaged or destroyed, and numerous outbuildings, sheds, and barns were destroyed. Six people were injured.
EF2	NE of Rincon	Effingham	GA	32.33°N 81.2°W	0144–0145	0.5 mi (0.80 km)	100 yd (91 m)	$3,000,000	A water cooling tower was destroyed and a second was damaged. Several buildings were damaged, two high voltage transmission towers were toppled, and several dozen trees were snapped or uprooted. Tractor trailer cargo containers were tossed up to 100 yd (91 m).

=== March 17 event ===
List of confirmed tornadoes – Monday, March 17, 2008
EF#	Location	County / Parish	State	Start Coord.	Time (UTC)	Path length	Max width	Damage	Summary
EF0	W of Maryneal	Nolan	TX	32.24°N 100.52°W	1915–1918	0.1 mi (0.16 km)	50 yd (46 m)	$0	The public reported a tornado.
EF0	NE of Talpa	Coleman	TX	31.819°N 99.657°W	0053–0056	0.1 mi (0.16 km)	50 yd (46 m)	$0	An off-duty NWS employee reported a tornado.
EF0	NE of Novice	Coleman	TX	32.03°N 99.52°W	0129–0132	0.1 mi (0.16 km)	50 yd (46 m)	$0	Amateur radio relayed a tornado touchdown.
EF0	E of Mena	Polk	AR	34.5911°N 93.9675°W	0231–0232	0.3 mi (0.48 km)	25 yd (23 m)	$10,000	A house under construction had part of its roof removed. A few trees were snapped.

=== March 18 event ===
List of confirmed tornadoes – Tuesday, March 18, 2008
EF#	Location	County / Parish	State	Start Coord.	Time (UTC)	Path length	Max width	Damage	Summary
EF1	N of Branch	Franklin	AR	35.3334°N 93.9792°W	1655–1705	7 mi (11 km)	600 yd (550 m)	$75,000	Several large barns were destroyed, several homes were damaged, and trees and power poles were downed.
EF0	Southern Corpus Christi	Nueces	TX	27.6881°N 97.3845°W	1940–2000	2.34 mi (3.77 km)	100 yd (91 m)	$50,000	Trees, limbs, and fencing were downed. Signs were blown out and shingle damage occurred to an apartment, a bank, and a hotel.
EF1	N of Sulphur Springs	Hopkins	TX	33.2065°N 95.6016°W	2030–2032	2.69 mi (4.33 km)	70 yd (64 m)	$250,000	Trees and power lines were downed. Several sheds were damaged or destroyed; debris from one bent a lightpole. Several houses sustained primarily shingle damage, and a semi trailer was blown over.
EF1	NW of Henderson to Longview	Rusk, Gregg	TX	32.2539°N 94.8925°W	0136–0209	20.51 mi (33.01 km)	300 yd (270 m)	$3,500,000	A house, two metal buildings, and another structure were damaged. Several trees and power lines were downed; fallen trees damaged houses, vehicles, and an elementary school.

=== March 19 event ===
List of confirmed tornadoes – Wednesday, March 19, 2008
EF#	Location	County / Parish	State	Start Coord.	Time (UTC)	Path length	Max width	Damage	Summary
EF1	Estelle	Jefferson	LA	29.8535°N 90.1048°W	0900–0905	1.28 mi (2.06 km)	20 yd (18 m)	$200,000	Several large hardwood trees were downed; fallen trees damaged buildings and vehicles. A total of 13 houses were damaged. One person was injured.
EF0	ENE of Blue Creek	Kanawha	WV	38.4611°N 81.4231°W	2243–2244	0.2 mi (0.32 km)	50 yd (46 m)	$40,000	Several structures were damaged, several trees were downed, a camper was rolled into a telephone pole, and a pontoon boat was lifted onto a fence.

=== March 27 event ===
List of confirmed tornadoes – Thursday, March 27, 2008
EF#	Location	County / Parish	State	Start Coord.	Time (UTC)	Path length	Max width	Damage	Summary
EF0	Council Hill	Muskogee, McIntosh	OK	35.55°N 95.65°W	2332–2334	1 mi (1.6 km)	100 yd (91 m)	$130,000	The roofs of a church and several homes were damaged. Tree damage was found.
EF0	SSE of Licking	Texas	MO	37.4754°N 91.8608°W	0100–0101	0.09 mi (0.14 km)	50 yd (46 m)	$0	A tornado briefly touched down in an open field.

=== March 30 event ===
List of confirmed tornadoes – Sunday, March 30, 2008
EF#	Location	County / Parish	State	Start Coord.	Time (UTC)	Path length	Max width	Damage	Summary
EF0	SW of Natchitoches	Natchitoches	LA	31.6512°N 93.2285°W	2006–2007	1.5 mi (2.4 km)	100 yd (91 m)	$750,000	All 17 homes at a mobile home park sustained damage either due to fallen trees or the tornado, including one that was damaged severely. Three people were injured.
EF0	Milam area	Sabine	TX	31.4195°N 93.8499°W	2048–2052	1.64 mi (2.64 km)	50 yd (46 m)	$1,000	Several large trees were snapped or uprooted; limbs were broken.
EF0	Fisher	Sabine	LA	31.4954°N 93.452°W	2231–2233	0.82 mi (1.32 km)	50 yd (46 m)	$15,000	Several large trees were snapped or uprooted, a large shed was destroyed, and a wood-framed home sustained minor roof damage.
EF0	NE of Natchitoches	Natchitoches	LA	31.8002°N 93.0248°W	2314–2315	1.25 mi (2.01 km)	50 yd (46 m)	$1,000	Several large trees were snapped or uprooted.
EF0	W of Albert	Caddo	OK	35.23°N 98.4313°W	0244–0246	0.5 mi (0.80 km)	20 yd (18 m)	$10,000	The roof of a residence and a barn were damaged.
EF0	W of Cogar	Caddo	OK	35.33°N 98.201°W	0322	0.1 mi (0.16 km)	20 yd (18 m)	$0	A storm chaser submitted video of a brief tornado.

=== March 31 event ===
List of confirmed tornadoes – Monday, March 31, 2008
EF#	Location	County / Parish	State	Start Coord.	Time (UTC)	Path length	Max width	Damage	Summary
EF0	W of Edmond	Oklahoma	OK	35.65°N 97.6403°W	0623	0.2 mi (0.32 km)	20 yd (18 m)	$0	A media storm chaser reported a brief tornado.
EF1	NW of Edmond	Oklahoma	OK	35.65°N 97.5512°W	0639–0645	3.5 mi (5.6 km)	100 yd (91 m)	$450,000	Many homes sustained roof, window, garage door, and fence damage; one home lost a large part of its roof and inside severely damaged. Several large power transmission poles were downed.
EF1	N of Hominy	Osage	OK	36.4467°N 96.4138°W	1046–1054	5.5 mi (8.9 km)	250 yd (230 m)	$50,000	One roof of a home was substantially damaged while others were affected less severely. Barns were damaged or destroyed and trees were downed.
EF0	WSW of Ramona	Washington	OK	36.5245°N 95.9366°W	1225	0.2 mi (0.32 km)	100 yd (91 m)	$0	A media storm chaser reported a brief tornado.
EF0	NNE of Perry	Noble	OK	36.3702°N 97.2488°W	1420	0.1 mi (0.16 km)	20 yd (18 m)	$5,000	A hay barn was damaged.
EF1	W of Elkton	Hickory	MO	37.8299°N 93.5005°W	1448–1454	3.38 mi (5.44 km)	100 yd (91 m)	$25,000	Three homes were damaged and several trees were snapped.
EF0	SE of Albatross	Lawrence	MO	37.1695°N 93.8444°W	1509–1510	0.45 mi (0.72 km)	40 yd (37 m)	$20,000	A hay barn was damaged and a few power poles were snapped.
EF0	E of Moundville	Vernon	MO	37.7749°N 94.4383°W	1533–1534	0.17 mi (0.27 km)	10 yd (9.1 m)	$0	A trained storm spotter reported a brief tornado.
EF0	SW of El Dorado Springs	Cedar	MO	37.8508°N 94.0493°W	1659–1700	0.59 mi (0.95 km)	75 yd (69 m)	$5,000	A barn sustained minor damage, and several trees near the barn were snapped or uprooted.
EF1	S of Seneca	Ottawa, Newton	OK, MO	36.8°N 94.6686°W	1844–1852	5.37 mi (8.64 km)	200 yd (180 m)	$125,000	Several homes had their roofs severely damaged while others had their windows broken. Several barns and outbuildings were damaged or destroyed, power poles were damaged, and numerous trees were snapped or uprooted.
EF1	Northern Neosho	Newton	MO	36.8639°N 94.4191°W	1859–1906	3.82 mi (6.15 km)	80 yd (73 m)	$100,000	Ten homes were damaged and another three were destroyed. A business was damaged. Three people were injured.
EF2	Buffalo	Dallas	MO	37.6155°N 93.1593°W	1917–1923	4.67 mi (7.52 km)	300 yd (270 m)	$1,000,000	Approximately 40 homes were heavily damaged or destroyed. An industrial plant was damaged, and airplanes were flipped at Buffalo Airport. Three people were injured.
EF2	Northern Lebanon	Laclede	MO	37.6961°N 92.6672°W	1946–1950	1.79 mi (2.88 km)	75 yd (69 m)	$500,000	A strong tornado damaged several homes and businesses. A school bus was overturned at an Esther Elementary school.
EF0	SSW of Godley	Johnson	TX	32.4398°N 97.5421°W	2005–2006	0.78 mi (1.26 km)	40 yd (37 m)	$35,000	Several sheds and outbuildings were rolled. Fences were damaged, and trees were downed.
EF0	NE of Godley	Johnson	TX	32.4722°N 97.4666°W	2010–2014	1.51 mi (2.43 km)	40 yd (37 m)	$75,000	A mobile home was rolled and destroyed. A nearby car sustained substantial damage, a shed was damaged, and power lines were downed.
EF0	E of Festus	Monroe	IL	38.2273°N 90.3452°W	2145–2147	1.78 mi (2.86 km)	30 yd (27 m)	Unknown	A garage and a barn were damaged, and tree limbs were downed.
EF0	SE of Goodnight	Polk	MO	37.4176°N 93.2022°W	2206–2207	0.84 mi (1.35 km)	50 yd (46 m)	$25,000	A home, barn, and power poles were damaged.
EF0	NW of Gainesville	Ozark	MO	36.6673°N 92.5193°W	2212–2213	0.18 mi (0.29 km)	20 yd (18 m)	$1,000	A turkey barn sustained minor damage.
EF0	South Fork	Howell	MO	36.6274°N 91.9617°W	2247–2248	0.03 mi (0.048 km)	20 yd (18 m)	$10,000	A barn housing a camping unit was destroyed.
EF0	Hugo Lake	Choctaw	OK	34.0916°N 95.4565°W	0010	0.1 mi (0.16 km)	75 yd (69 m)	$0	A tornado was photographed by the public.
EF1	N of Wright City	McCurtain	OK	34.1561°N 95.047°W	0031–0041	4.92 mi (7.92 km)	450 yd (410 m)	$10,000	Numerous trees were snapped or uprooted. Two homes sustained minor damage.

== April ==
Confirmed tornadoes by Enhanced Fujita rating
EFU	EF0	EF1	EF2	EF3	EF4	EF5	Total
0	103	65	16	2	0	0	186

=== April 3 event ===
List of confirmed tornadoes – Thursday, April 3, 2008
EF#	Location	County / Parish	State	Start Coord.	Time (UTC)	Path length	Max width	Damage	Summary
EF1	NW of Haskell	Saline	AR	34.5085°N 92.7397°W	0202–0219	8.1 mi (13.0 km)	500 yd (460 m)	$5,000,000	Nine houses and three mobile homes were destroyed; sixteen houses and one mobile home sustained major damage; forty homes and one mobile home sustained minor damage. Many power lines and some power poles were downed. Thousands of trees were toppled. One person was injured.
EF2	Benton to Bryant	Saline	AR	34.5891°N 92.5476°W	0223–0232	2.7 mi (4.3 km)	250 yd (230 m)	$5,000,000	Four residences sustained major damage an additional twenty sustained minor damage. In the Hurricane Lake Mobile Home Park, twenty-two mobile homes were destroyed, eleven mobile homes sustained major damage, and ten mobile homes sustained minor damage. More than one hundred and fifty vehicles were damaged at a car dealership. A lumber yard sustained substantial damage. One person was injured.
EF2	Northwestern Bryant	Saline	AR	34.6352°N 92.521°W	0234–0240	2.58 mi (4.15 km)	500 yd (460 m)	$10,000,000	Six houses were destroyed and an additional thirty others suffered varying degrees of damage, especially in the Hurricane Meadows subdivision.
EF1	Little Rock	Pulaski	AR	34.7481°N 92.3774°W	0247–0301	4.81 mi (7.74 km)	300 yd (270 m)	$50,000,000	Six houses were destroyed while an additional ninety-eight sustained major damage and one hundred and seventy sustained minor damage. In addition, four businesses sustained major damage and three sustained minor damage; eleven apartments were affected. One person was injured.
EF2	Northern Little Rock	Pulaski	AR	34.8133°N 92.2744°W	0306–0320	7.07 mi (11.38 km)	800 yd (730 m)	$12,000,000	A number of hangars suffered substantial damage at North Little Rock Airport; almost all tied-down small planes were overturned. A DC3 aircraft rolled about 0.25 mi (0.40 km) into a ditch, simultaneously trapping a small plane underneath it. A flagpole, birdhouse, and television antenna were toppled at the National Weather Service office. A considerable amount of roof damage occurred at Slyvan Hills High School, and the Sherwood Sports Complex suffered substantial damage.
EF1	Gravel Ridge	Pulaski	AR	34.8682°N 92.1913°W	0314–0315	0.7 mi (1.1 km)	100 yd (91 m)	$30,000	A satellite tornado to the 0306–0320 UTC EF2 downed multiple trees which fell on a house and a mobile home.
EF1	Little Rock Air Force Base	Pulaski	AR	34.9038°N 92.1129°W	0323–0326	2.13 mi (3.43 km)	100 yd (91 m)	$25,000	A number of trees and a large billboard were downed.
EF1	N of Bismarck	Hot Spring	AR	34.3699°N 93.2032°W	0328–0335	4.19 mi (6.74 km)	80 yd (73 m)	$15,000	Dozens of trees were downed, and the roof of one home was damaged.
EF2	Cabot to Austin to Ward	Lonoke	AR	34.9421°N 92.0643°W	0328–0340	9.45 mi (15.21 km)	300 yd (270 m)	$2,000,000	A self-storage warehouse and two storage buildings were destroyed. A truck repair building was severely damaged, and two large warehouses also sustained lesser damage. Several vehicles on a used car lot were damaged by a fallen canopy. A gas station had its canopy damaged, several homes and businesses sustained roof damage, and trees were downed.
EF1	W of Ward to SW of Searcy	Lonoke, White	AR	35.0446°N 92.02°W	0342–0401	13.19 mi (21.23 km)	300 yd (270 m)	$35,000	Numerous trees were toppled, and several barns and outbuildings sustained roof damage.
EF1	SE of Hot Springs	Garland, Hot Spring	AR	34.4132°N 92.9552°W	0350–0357	1.11 mi (1.79 km)	250 yd (230 m)	$200,000	Hundreds of trees were downed.

=== April 4 event ===
List of confirmed tornadoes – Friday, April 4, 2008 (Note: All dates are based on the local time zone where the tornado touched down; however, all times are in Coordinated Universal Time for consistency. All damage totals are in 2008 USD unless otherwise stated.)
EF#	Location	County / Parish	State	Start Coord.	Time (UTC)	Path length	Max width	Damage	Summary
EF1	S of Farmington	Graves	KY	36.52°N 88.559°W	0620–0624	3.65 mi (5.87 km)	170 yd (160 m)	$50,000	An old grocery store and mobile home were deroofed. About thirty percent of the roof on one large farm equipment building was ripped off while some siding was removed from a second. Between 100 and 200 trees were snapped or uprooted.
EF1	S of Leighton	Colbert	AL	34.6929°N 87.6209°W	1303–1310	6.52 mi (10.49 km)	20 yd (18 m)	$75,000	A tornado moving upward of 85 mph (140 km/h) ripped a large portion of the roof off a Whitesell distribution center. A building at the Colbert County Road Department was heavily damaged.
EF0	SW of Athens	Limestone	AL	34.7664°N 87.09°W	1334–1341	0.25 mi (0.40 km)	25 yd (23 m)	$1,000	A shed was destroyed. A home and several trees were damaged.
EF0	WSW of Harvest	Limestone	AL	34.8393°N 86.8019°W	1404–1409	1.56 mi (2.51 km)	20 yd (18 m)	$10,000	A home, two barn structures, numerous trees, and a security fence were damaged. A trampoline was tossed and swirl patterns were found in a grassy field.
EF1	Atlanta	Winn	LA	31.82°N 92.79°W	1508–1512	5.79 mi (9.32 km)	400 yd (370 m)	$25,000	A barn was completely destroyed, with metal tossed into nearby trees. A home sustained shingle damage. Numerous trees were snapped or uprooted.
EF1	E of Winnfield	Winn	LA	31.921°N 92.501°W	1521–1526	7.6 mi (12.2 km)	200 yd (180 m)	$0	Numerous large trees were downed; one fell on a car, injuring the occupant.
EF0	S of Nauvoo	Walker	AL	33.9761°N 87.5155°W	1528–1531	2.5 mi (4.0 km)	75 yd (69 m)	$10,000	Two outbuildings, a mobile home, and a house sustained minor damage. Numerous trees were snapped off, and a trampoline was tossed.
EF1	WNW of Redwood	Warren	MS	32.5336°N 91.038°W	1623–1627	3.66 mi (5.89 km)	300 yd (270 m)	$1,200,000	Hundreds of trees were snapped or uprooted; 30 to 40 homes, mostly mobile homes, were damaged by fallen trees. An additional 10 to 15 structures sustained roof damage or had their carports torn off. Several power lines were down.
EF1	E of Vicksburg	Warren	MS	32.341°N 90.7831°W	1652–1654	2.16 mi (3.48 km)	209 yd (191 m)	$120,000	Numerous trees were snapped and uprooted; a few structures were damaged by fallen trees. Several power lines were downed. One person was injured.
EF1	NW of Bolton	Hinds	MS	32.4019°N 90.5378°W	1711–1714	2.72 mi (4.38 km)	300 yd (270 m)	$250,000	A shed was destroyed, and numerous trees were snapped and uprooted.
EF1	E of Bolton	Hinds	MS	32.36°N 90.43°W	1717–1719	2.24 mi (3.60 km)	200 yd (180 m)	$80,000	Two billboards were downed and destroyed while a third was heavily damaged. Numerous trees were snapped and uprooted.
EF2	Northern Jackson	Madison, Hinds, Rankin	MS	32.4028°N 90.2041°W	1728–1742	12.99 mi (20.91 km)	900 yd (820 m)	$46,025,000	Countless trees were snapped and uprooted, many of which caused damage to structures upon falling. Light poles were snapped, two hotels were damaged, and dozens of cars at a car dealership had their windows blown out. Several commercial and warehouse buildings sustained extensive roof and facade damage, and a number of homes and apartments sustained severe damage to their roofs. Power poles were snapped, a fence was flattened, and an awning was blown out. Twenty-one people were injured.
EF0	E of Saks	Calhoun	AL	33.7133°N 85.7877°W	2024	0.1 mi (0.16 km)	50 yd (46 m)	$0	A trained storm spotter videoed a brief tornado.
EF1	NE of Winnsboro	Fairfield	SC	34.407°N 80.965°W	2224–2230	6.54 mi (10.53 km)	80 yd (73 m)	$0	Several groves of trees were downed in a convergent pattern.
EF0	Joanna	Laurens, Newberry	SC	34.427°N 81.642°W	0042–0046	4.64 mi (7.47 km)	60 yd (55 m)	$10,000	Trees were downed onto roads, a house, and a mobile home. The latter two structures also sustained wind damage to their roofs and exterior walls.

=== April 5 event ===
List of confirmed tornadoes – Saturday, April 5, 2008
EF#	Location	County / Parish	State	Start Coord.	Time (UTC)	Path length	Max width	Damage	Summary
EF0	SSW of Kinston	Lenoir	NC	35.12°N 77.67°W	0755–0800	2.89 mi (4.65 km)	100 yd (91 m)	$5,000	Multiple trees were twisted and uprooted, and several outbuildings sustained structural damage.

=== April 7 event ===
List of confirmed tornadoes – Monday, April 7, 2008
EF#	Location	County / Parish	State	Start Coord.	Time (UTC)	Path length	Max width	Damage	Summary
EF0	NW of Electra	Wichita	TX	34.0411°N 98.9523°W	2156	0.1 mi (0.16 km)	50 yd (46 m)	$0	Trained storm spotters reported a brief tornado.
EF1	E of Harrold	Wilbarger, Wichita	TX	34.08°N 98.9601°W	2206–2212	2 mi (3.2 km)	200 yd (180 m)	$35,000	A vehicle was blown into the path of a pickup, injuring the occupant. A garage was destroyed, with the inside car sustaining moderate damage. A large tree was damaged, and horse feeders were moved about 600–700 ft (200–230 yd).
EF0	S of Yakima	Yakima	WA	46.55°N 120.5752°W	2215–2216	0.05 mi (0.080 km)	10 yd (9.1 m)	$5,000	A trained storm spotter observed a brief landspout tornado.

=== April 8 event ===
List of confirmed tornadoes – Tuesday, April 8, 2008
EF#	Location	County / Parish	State	Start Coord.	Time (UTC)	Path length	Max width	Damage	Summary
EF0	W of Gatesville	Coryell	TX	31.4361°N 97.9134°W	0118–0123	1.82 mi (2.93 km)	50 yd (46 m)	$0	Tree damage was observed.

=== April 9 event ===
List of confirmed tornadoes – Wednesday, April 9, 2008
EF#	Location	County / Parish	State	Start Coord.	Time (UTC)	Path length	Max width	Damage	Summary
EF1	NE of Plainwell	Allegan, Barry	MI	42.4402°N 85.5813°W	0539–0544	4.65 mi (7.48 km)	100 yd (91 m)	$250,000	A hose barn was significantly damaged, a trailer was lifted, and some gravel yard equipment was damaged. A tank was lofted, and numerous trees were snapped or uprooted.
EF0	NW of Tye	Taylor	TX	32.49°N 99.92°W	2028–2031	0.1 mi (0.16 km)	50 yd (46 m)	$0	Storm chasers reported a brief tornado.
EF0	NE of Tye	Taylor	TX	32.47°N 99.85°W	2035–2038	0.1 mi (0.16 km)	50 yd (46 m)	$0	Storm chasers reported a brief tornado.
EF0	SW of Breckenridge	Stephens	TX	32.6688°N 98.988°W	2212–2217	2.32 mi (3.73 km)	75 yd (69 m)	$40,000	A large metal shed and several trees were damaged. Several large storage containers were blown across the road.
EF1	SE of Breckenridge	Stephens	TX	32.7238°N 98.9127°W	2221–2232	7.06 mi (11.36 km)	400 yd (370 m)	$1,000,000	Storage buildings, power poles, trees, and an estimated 46 homes sustained minor to considerable damage. Several airport buildings had their overhead doors blown in. Six people were injured.
EF0	E of Breckenridge	Stephens	TX	32.748°N 98.7685°W	2236–2238	1.54 mi (2.48 km)	70 yd (64 m)	$0	Storm chasers reported a brief tornado.
EF0	WNW of Palo Pinto	Palo Pinto	TX	32.8138°N 98.5384°W	2255–2256	1.13 mi (1.82 km)	50 yd (46 m)	$0	Trained storm spotters reported a brief tornado.
EF0	NW of Kalispell	Flathead	MT	48.2196°N 114.3423°W	2345–0000	0.01 mi (0.016 km)	10 yd (9.1 m)	$0	Members of the public reported a landspout tornado.
EF0	NE of Graford	Palo Pinto	TX	32.95°N 98.171°W	2350–2353	1.67 mi (2.69 km)	100 yd (91 m)	$150,000	A few houses had their roofs ripped off, power poles were snapped, several trees were uprooted.
EF0	N of Soper	Choctaw	OK	34.0445°N 95.7°W	0010	0.1 mi (0.16 km)	75 yd (69 m)	$0	A KOTV-DT storm chaser reported a brief tornado.
EF0	SW of Paradise	Wise	TX	33.1065°N 97.7358°W	0043–0046	1.82 mi (2.93 km)	60 yd (55 m)	$0	Trained storm spotters reported a tornado.
EF0	S of Pickens	McCurtain	OK	34.3817°N 95.0368°W	0126–0129	1.01 mi (1.63 km)	100 yd (91 m)	$0	A few trees were damaged.
EF0	S of Bethel	McCurtain	OK	34.2127°N 94.813°W	0142–0144	0.96 mi (1.54 km)	150 yd (140 m)	$0	A few trees were snapped and uprooted.
EF0	SW of McCurtain	Haskell	OK	35.1398°N 94.9825°W	0203	0.1 mi (0.16 km)	75 yd (69 m)	$1,000	Power lines were downed.
EF0	W of Sadler	Grayson	TX	33.6705°N 96.8954°W	0220–0222	1.26 mi (2.03 km)	50 yd (46 m)	$0	A storm chaser observed a brief tornado.
EF1	SE of Dallas	Polk	AR	34.4578°N 94.1837°W	0242–0243	2.13 mi (3.43 km)	150 yd (140 m)	$0	Trees were downed in Ouachita National Forest.
EF0	N of Pocola	Le Flore	OK	35.28°N 94.4823°W	0307	0.1 mi (0.16 km)	75 yd (69 m)	$0	Storm chasers reported a brief tornado over open country.
EF0	NNE of Sherwood	Irion	TX	31.422°N 100.7376°W	0457–0504	3.67 mi (5.91 km)	300 yd (270 m)	$0	Trees limbs were snapped.
EF1	SW of Tankersley	Tom Green	TX	31.3351°N 100.6896°W	0501–0506	1.5 mi (2.4 km)	75 yd (69 m)	$150,000	The roof and some walls to the upper floor of a residence were ripped off.
EF0	S of San Angelo	Tom Green	TX	31.3178°N 100.524°W	0507–0515	6.73 mi (10.83 km)	80 yd (73 m)	$10,000	Tree limbs were snapped, and six utility poles were downed.
EF1	San Angelo	Tom Green	TX	31.4378°N 100.5176°W	0514–0518	4.06 mi (6.53 km)	150 yd (140 m)	$6,000,000	A large distribution warehouse was severely damaged, and two trailers were overturned. A communication tower, power lines, and power poles were toppled. Cars were flipped, and roofs and road signs were damaged.
EF0	SE of Vancourt	Tom Green	TX	31.304°N 100.152°W	0532–0535	2 mi (3.2 km)	100 yd (91 m)	$50,000	Twenty sheep shelters were destroyed, irrigation equipment was damaged, an RV travel trailer was overturned, and tin was removed from a large outbuilding.

=== April 10 event ===
List of confirmed tornadoes – Thursday, April 10, 2008
EF#	Location	County / Parish	State	Start Coord.	Time (UTC)	Path length	Max width	Damage	Summary
EF1	W of Brownwood	Brown	TX	31.7039°N 99.0707°W	06:35–06:38	1.54 mi (2.48 km)	125 yd (114 m)	$150,000	Grain silos and roofs were damaged, while a trailer was overturned.
EF1	Southern Glen Rose	Somervell	TX	32.2163°N 97.7886°W	08:03–08:11	7.59 mi (12.21 km)	75 yd (69 m)	$200,000	One home sustained significant damage to its roof, porch, and well house while a second had its porch ripped off. Numerous outbuildings were destroyed, about 50 trees were downed or uprooted, and a school lost the roof to its music room.
EF1	SW of Lillian	Johnson	TX	32.4663°N 97.2438°W	08:30–08:37	2.92 mi (4.70 km)	50 yd (46 m)	$25,000,000	At least thirty homes sustained varying degrees of damage, including three that were rendered total losses. Many sheds and outbuildings were damaged or destroyed, several trees were uprooted (two of which fell on homes), and power lines were downed.
EF1	DeSoto	Dallas	TX	32.6133°N 96.859°W	09:00–09:05	2.01 mi (3.23 km)	40 yd (37 m)	$1,000,000	Around 20 homes sustained damage, with one losing the majority of its roof. Many trees, power poles, and power lines were downed. Sheds and outbuildings sustained damage.
EF1	Allen to McKinney	Collin	TX	33.0862°N 96.7366°W	09:04–09:10	7.17 mi (11.54 km)	175 yd (160 m)	$12,000,000	Hundreds of homes sustained damage to their roofs, trees, or fences. The Collin County Regional Airport sustained damage to several hangars and some of its aircraft. Numerous power lines and power poles were downed.
EF0	Belton to Temple	Bell	TX	31.07°N 97.47°W	09:05–09:17	6.42 mi (10.33 km)	100 yd (91 m)	$500,000	Numerous roofs, fences, and signs were damaged; one downed fence was anchored with cement pillars. A metal lost its roof and had a few of its rooms barricaded by debris, trapping guests. A duplex also lost its roof and suffered water damage, vehicles were damaged, a golf course lost its scoreboard, and about 40 trees were damaged or uprooted.
EF1	NE of Williford	Sharp	AR	36.2744°N 91.3347°W	09:29–09:30	1.02 mi (1.64 km)	200 yd (180 m)	$10,000	A shed and a camping trailer were destroyed, and a number of trees were toppled.
EF0	NNE of Vian	Sequoyah	OK	35.5802°N 94.9292°W	09:56–09:57	2 mi (3.2 km)	150 yd (140 m)	$0	Numerous trees were damaged.
EF2	N of Bunch	Adair	OK	35.7535°N 94.8075°W	10:15–10:17	2.75 mi (4.43 km)	300 yd (270 m)	$100,000	Several mobile homes, barns, and other buildings were destroyed. Power poles were snapped, and extensive tree damage was noted.
EF2	E of Stilwell	Adair, Washington	OK, AR	35.7895°N 94.5393°W	10:26–10:33	9 mi (14 km)	400 yd (370 m)	$125,000	A mobile and a barn were destroyed, a vehicle was rolled, power poles were snapped, and extensive tree damage occurred.
EF2	SE of Fayetteville	Washington	AR	35.996°N 94.115°W	10:50–10:53	3 mi (4.8 km)	600 yd (550 m)	$125,000	A permanent home sustained major damage while several others were affected. Power poles were snapped and extensive tree damage was observed.
EF1	W of Wesley	Madison	AR	36.0253°N 93.9342°W	11:02–11:03	0.8 mi (1.3 km)	200 yd (180 m)	$10,000	Extensive tree damage occurred and a barn was destroyed.
EF1	N of Huntsville to S of Berryville	Madison, Carroll	AR	36.1567°N 93.698°W	11:20–11:32	10.7 mi (17.2 km)	900 yd (820 m)	$100,000	Barns were destroyed, a home was damaged, and extensive tree damage occurred.
EF0	WSW of Topaz	Douglas	MO	36.94°N 92.26°W	12:55–12:56	0.33 mi (0.53 km)	75 yd (69 m)	$40,000	One home sustained major roof damage and two other buildings were destroyed.
EF2	W of Texarkana	Bowie	TX	33.4216°N 94.2351°W	13:12–13:14	5.54 mi (8.92 km)	200 yd (180 m)	$1,000,000	A cinder-block and lawnmower business was completely destroyed, a brick home sustained significant damage to its roof and exterior walls, and a metal shop built with large metal I-beams was demolished; I-beams were tossed up to 200 yd (180 m). In total, 12 structures were damaged or destroyed. Numerous trees were downed, three tractor trailers were flipped (resulting in one injury), and the Lonestar Army Ammunition Depot reportedly suffered damage. An outbuilding sales business lost several buildings and had many others damaged. Several sheds and barns were damaged or destroyed, and a greenhouse was severely damaged.
EF0	WSW of Pomona	Howell	MO	36.81°N 92.09°W	13:15–13:19	3.31 mi (5.33 km)	150 yd (140 m)	$0	Numerous trees were damaged.
EF1	NW of Sheridan to S of East End	Grant, Saline	AR	34.3459°N 92.5056°W	15:56–16:15	15.06 mi (24.24 km)	175 yd (160 m)	$30,000	A covered pavilion at a cemetery, a shed, a cattle shed, and a barn were destroyed. Four cows and a donkey were killed. Dozens of trees were snapped or downed.
EF0	NNE of Lineville	Wayne	IA	40.6361°N 93.4821°W	21:33–21:34	0.56 mi (0.90 km)	20 yd (18 m)	$0	A brief tornado caused insignificant damage.
EF0	ENE of Cambria	Wayne	IA	40.8344°N 93.3823°W	21:49–21:50	0.39 mi (0.63 km)	20 yd (18 m)	$0	A brief tornado caused insignificant damage.
EF1	E of Seymour	Appanoose	IA	40.6696°N 93.0812°W	21:57–21:59	2.01 mi (3.23 km)	30 yd (27 m)	$75,000	Law enforcement reported a tornado.
EF1	W of Moravia	Appanoose	IA	40.857°N 93.0027°W	22:10–22:13	2.92 mi (4.70 km)	50 yd (46 m)	$75,000	A garage and a house were damaged.
EF1	SW of Beacon	Mahaska	IA	41.1942°N 92.7125°W	22:43–22:46	2.97 mi (4.78 km)	50 yd (46 m)	$100,000	A home had its shingles ripped off. One outbuilding was damaged, with the top of the structure crushed.
EF0	W of Ursa to Lima	Adams	IL	40.07°N 91.4759°W	22:55–23:02	9.13 mi (14.69 km)	50 yd (46 m)	Unknown	A few trees were downed or had their limbs snapped. Several power lines were toppled, and a few homes sustained minor damage.
EF2	W of Keosauqua	Van Buren	IA	40.72°N 92.065°W	23:16–23:19	1.83 mi (2.95 km)	220 yd (200 m)	$150,000	A wine shed and a mobile home were destroyed. The top of a silo was ripped off, the second story of a winery was damaged, and a house sustained minor structural damage. Several large trees were topped off.
EF1	E of Montezuma	Poweshiek	IA	41.5463°N 92.4266°W	23:21–23:29	7.64 mi (12.30 km)	50 yd (46 m)	$100,000	A farmstead saw a portion of its roof peeled off, with siding torn and windows blown out. Two barns on the property were blown down.
EF1	W of Stockport	Van Buren	IA	40.815°N 91.873°W	23:25–23:32	5.29 mi (8.51 km)	50 yd (46 m)	$30,000	A barn had its roof ripped off, a shed was blown off its foundation, some trees were damaged, and a utility pole was blown onto a car.
EF1	E of Sutter	Hancock	IL	40.279°N 91.306°W	23:30–23:32	1.6 mi (2.6 km)	150 yd (140 m)	$100,000	A garage, barns, and sheds were destroyed; another barn was blown off its foundation. A church roof, hog confinement, some homes, outbuildings, and several trees were damaged.
EF0	W of Basco	Hancock	IL	40.33°N 91.28°W	23:33–23:34	0.2 mi (0.32 km)	50 yd (46 m)	$20,000	Trees and the roof to a house were damaged.
EF0	E of Elvaston	Hancock	IL	40.395°N 91.236°W	23:35–23:36	0.75 mi (1.21 km)	75 yd (69 m)	$30,000	One residence sustained damage to its roof, garage door, and trees.
EF0	W of Victor	Poweshiek	IA	41.7236°N 92.3479°W	23:36–23:38	2.44 mi (3.93 km)	25 yd (23 m)	$50,000	A home and outbuildings were damaged, trees were uprooted, and road signs were pulled from the ground.
EF0	NE of South English	Keokuk	IA	41.473°N 92.063°W	00:03–00:08	1.83 mi (2.95 km)	100 yd (91 m)	$50,000	Some shingles were blown off a few houses, some outbuildings and a machine shed were damaged or destroyed, and some trees were downed.
EF0	S of Keota	Keokuk	IA	41.3121°N 91.955°W	00:05	0.01 mi (0.016 km)	25 yd (23 m)	$0	Law enforcement reported a brief tornado.
EF0	St. Joseph	Buchanan	MO	39.76°N 94.85°W	01:30–01:32	0.33 mi (0.53 km)	30 yd (27 m)	$70,000	Several buildings were damaged, and one person was injured.

=== April 11 event ===
List of confirmed tornadoes – Friday, April 11, 2008
EF#	Location	County / Parish	State	Start Coord.	Time (UTC)	Path length	Max width	Damage	Summary
EF1	NE of Dickson	Dickson	TN	36.123°N 87.3268°W	1600–1603	1.6 mi (2.6 km)	20 yd (18 m)	$75,000	Two barns were flattened, an outbuilding was destroyed, trees were snapped and uprooted, and homes sustained damage.
EF3	Lawrenceburg to WSW of Lynnville	Lawrence, Giles	TN	35.2677°N 87.4027°W	1705–1724	15.05 mi (24.22 km)	100 yd (91 m)	$4,000,000	Many homes sustained roof damage, including one residential home that was completely leveled. The Liberty Hill Baptist Church sustained severe damage. Numerous trees were snapped and uprooted, utility poles were toppled, and a TVA electrical transmission tower was downed. One person was injured.
EF1	NW of Albany	Clinton	KY	36.7284°N 85.1768°W	1739–1740	0.39 mi (0.63 km)	150 yd (140 m)	$50,000	A barn was destroyed, a grain silo was heavily damaged, and several large trees were downed, some of which fell on a farmhouse and late model SUV and caused extensive damage. Several outbuildings sustained minor damage.
EF0	W of Lewisburg	Marshall	TN	35.45°N 86.8888°W	1740	0.1 mi (0.16 km)	10 yd (9.1 m)	$1,000	A few trees were downed.
EF1	N of Albany	Clinton	KY	36.7377°N 85.1372°W	1741–1742	0.45 mi (0.72 km)	150 yd (140 m)	$2,000	Four utility poles were snapped, and several large trees were downed.
EF2	W of Alpha	Clinton	KY	36.7529°N 85.0845°W	1744–1747	3.14 mi (5.05 km)	300 yd (270 m)	$75,000	Several homes and outbuildings were heavily damaged. Scores of trees and utility poles were downed.
EF2	NW of Alpha to SW of Monticello	Clinton, Wayne	KY	36.7729°N 85.038°W	1746–1801	8.69 mi (13.99 km)	400 yd (370 m)	$1,700,000	Several residences sustained damage, numerous trees were snapped and uprooted, and the roof was ripped from a ranch-style brick home, with the nearby outbuildings completely destroyed. A mobile home, barn, and grain silo were destroyed, while three other homes sustained heavy damage.
EF2	NE of Shelbyville	Bedford	TN	35.5348°N 86.4421°W	1815–1825	7.48 mi (12.04 km)	200 yd (180 m)	$100,000	Two barns were leveled, the roof and back walls of a residential home were ripped off, and trees were snapped or uprooted. Utility poles were bent, and a few other homes sustained roof damage.
EF0	S of Beech Grove	Coffee	TN	35.6159°N 86.2404°W	1830–1831	0.18 mi (0.29 km)	20 yd (18 m)	$50,000	A tractor trailer truck was blown onto its side.
EF1	N of McMinnville	Warren	TN	35.68°N 85.976°W	1842–1902	14.96 mi (24.08 km)	250 yd (230 m)	$1,100,000	Three homes were completely destroyed, five homes were severely damaged, and 50 to 60 homes sustained minor damage. Trees were snapped and uprooted, and at least two barns were demolished.
EF0	SSE of Vinemont	Cullman	AL	34.236°N 86.8635°W	1846–1847	0.17 mi (0.27 km)	10 yd (9.1 m)	$2,000,000	Trees and power lines were damaged.
EF0	WNW of Arab	Morgan	AL	34.3704°N 86.6433°W	1906–1907	1.23 mi (1.98 km)	20 yd (18 m)	Unknown	Trees damage was observed.
EF0	N of Meridianville	Madison	AL	34.88°N 86.61°W	1907–1912	3.78 mi (6.08 km)	200 yd (180 m)	$10,000	Two irrigation systems were flipped, and large trees were snapped and uprooted.
EF0	W of Union Grove	Marshall	AL	34.4032°N 86.5118°W	1916–1918	1.63 mi (2.62 km)	30 yd (27 m)	$2,000	The back of one home sustained slight damage, a shed was destroyed, and several trees were uprooted.
EF1	S of Doyle	White	TN	35.8167°N 85.5349°W	1920–1923	1.75 mi (2.82 km)	800 yd (730 m)	$50,000	Some houses were damaged, a power pole was snapped, trees were snapped and uprooted, and a mobile home had its roof ripped off.
EF0	SE of Grant	Marshall	AL	34.4995°N 86.2596°W	1933–1935	2.13 mi (3.43 km)	100 yd (91 m)	$10,000	Several trees were uprooted. Several homes and barns sustained minor roof damage.
EF0	N of Vinemont	Cullman	AL	34.2867°N 86.8952°W	2005–2006	0.07 mi (0.11 km)	40 yd (37 m)	$5,000	Tree damage was documented.
EF0	N of Lawtell	Evangeline, St. Landry	LA	30.5471°N 92.3114°W	2027–2035	8.39 mi (13.50 km)	50 yd (46 m)	$95,000	A few homes sustained minor roof damage, several tin sheds and barns sustained damage, and trees were snapped or uprooted. One mobile home was destroyed by a fallen tree while a second had its tin roof damaged.
EF0	N of Opelousas	St. Landry	LA	30.58°N 92.1387°W	2040–2045	4.14 mi (6.66 km)	50 yd (46 m)	$60,000	Several large trees were toppled, a house had its front windows broken and a portion of its tin roof ripped off, and several other residences sustained minor roof damage.
EF0	WNW of Hueytown	Jefferson	AL	33.4836°N 87.1151°W	2108	0.1 mi (0.16 km)	30 yd (27 m)	$5,000	A small grove of pine trees was snapped and uprooted.
EF0	Hoover	Jefferson	AL	33.3805°N 86.7942°W	2125–2126	0.3 mi (0.48 km)	30 yd (27 m)	$50,000	Multiple trees were snapped and uprooted, and major roof damage occurred at the Cedar Brook Apartments complex when a brick fire wall separating units collapsed.
EF1	E of Toledo	Lucas	OH	41.6345°N 83.37°W	2320–2330	5.25 mi (8.45 km)	35 yd (32 m)	$200,000	Several camping trailers were overturned, a large sign was downed, and dozens of trees were toppled.

=== April 12 event ===
List of confirmed tornadoes – Saturday, April 12, 2008
EF#	Location	County / Parish	State	Start Coord.	Time (UTC)	Path length	Max width	Damage	Summary
EF0	SE of Princeton	Wayne	NC	35.4001°N 78.146°W	1912–1915	0.44 mi (0.71 km)	20 yd (18 m)	$200,000	A garage was downed on a brick house. The roof of one mobile home was ripped off while a second rolled 20 yd (18 m) and struck a third mobile home. A fourth was partially blown from its foundation.
EF0	NW of Goldsboro	Wayne	NC	35.4337°N 78.03°W	1922–1923	0.92 mi (1.48 km)	20 yd (18 m)	$0	Law enforcement reported a tornado in an open field.
EF0	NE of Farmville	Pitt	NC	35.6111°N 77.5671°W	1959	0.1 mi (0.16 km)	20 yd (18 m)	$0	Two power poles were toppled.

=== April 17 event ===
List of confirmed tornadoes – Thursday, April 17, 2008
EF#	Location	County / Parish	State	Start Coord.	Time (UTC)	Path length	Max width	Damage	Summary
EF0	E of Willow Park	Parker	TX	32.7565°N 97.601°W	0020–0021	0.66 mi (1.06 km)	40 yd (37 m)	$3,000	A brief tornado caused power flashes.

=== April 18 event ===
List of confirmed tornadoes – Friday, April 18, 2008
EF#	Location	County / Parish	State	Start Coord.	Time (UTC)	Path length	Max width	Damage	Summary
EF1	W of Crystal Springs	Copiah, Hinds	MS	31.9761°N 90.6927°W	2031–2050	13.94 mi (22.43 km)	50 yd (46 m)	$30,000	A few mobile homes were damaged, including one that was completely destroyed. Numerous trees were snapped and uprooted, and the tin roof to a house was significantly damaged. A few people were flipped out of their boat while fishing in a small lake.
EF1	NW of Terry	Hinds	MS	32.1227°N 90.3858°W	2100–2106	3.74 mi (6.02 km)	100 yd (91 m)	$450,000	A dozen homes were damaged by either fallen trees or strong winds.
EF1	NW of Carthage	Madison, Leake	MS	32.7486°N 89.8088°W	2150–2205	8.2 mi (13.2 km)	75 yd (69 m)	$350,000	Numerous trees were snapped or uprooted, power lines were downed, and a couple of chicken coops were damaged.
EF1	WSW of Carthage	Madison, Leake	MS	32.6833°N 89.7482°W	2155–2202	5.96 mi (9.59 km)	150 yd (140 m)	$400,000	Numerous trees were snapped or uprooted, and four homes sustained minor roof damage.
EF1	S of Kosciusko	Leake	MS	32.9197°N 89.5839°W	2218–2220	1.55 mi (2.49 km)	75 yd (69 m)	$160,000	A garage was destroyed, a mobile home sustained significant roof damage, and scores of trees were snapped or uprooted.
EF1	WSW of Noxapater	Leake, Winston	MS	32.8897°N 89.3762°W	2233–2247	7.84 mi (12.62 km)	75 yd (69 m)	$450,000	An old chicken house was destroyed, and many trees were snapped or uprooted.
EF1	Louisville	Winston	MS	33.0903°N 89.0711°W	2304–2320	8.87 mi (14.27 km)	500 yd (460 m)	$3,100,000	Seven homes and the Island Plaza apartments sustained significant damage. The Georgia Pacific Paper Company building was severely damaged, a school bus barn was affected, and numerous trees were snapped or uprooted. One person was injured.

=== April 19 event ===
List of confirmed tornadoes – Saturday, April 19, 2008
EF#	Location	County / Parish	State	Start Coord.	Time (UTC)	Path length	Max width	Damage	Summary
EF1	NW of Cherryville	Cleveland, Lincoln	NC	35.389°N 81.523°W	0007–0016	4.91 mi (7.90 km)	25 yd (23 m)	$25,000	Several homes sustained mainly minor roof damage, a grain silo was damaged, numerous trees were snapped or uprooted, and power lines were downed.
EF1	W of Lincolnton	Lincoln	NC	35.466°N 81.354°W	0021–0034	4.26 mi (6.86 km)	30 yd (27 m)	$130,000	A chicken house was severely damaged; an estimated 10,000 chickens were killed. A mobile home was lifted from its foundation and destroyed, while several homes received mainly minor roof damage. Numerous trees and power lines were toppled.

=== April 20 event ===
List of confirmed tornadoes – Sunday, April 20, 2008
EF#	Location	County / Parish	State	Start Coord.	Time (UTC)	Path length	Max width	Damage	Summary
EF0	Southeastern Waldorf	Charles	MD	38.5921°N 76.8687°W	1809–1815	1.7 mi (2.7 km)	100 yd (91 m)	$50,000	Several large trees were snapped and uprooted, some of which fell onto houses and vehicles. Several houses lost roofing and sections of siding. A large storage shed was shifted off its foundation and had some of its doors blown out.
EF1	Chillum	Prince George's	MD	38.9634°N 76.9847°W	1827–1835	0.32 mi (0.51 km)	100 yd (91 m)	$40,000	The northeast section of the roof at George E. Peters Adventist Elementary School was lifted and thrown downwind into the parking lot; debris from the school broke windows at Metropolitan Adventist Church. A construction office trailer was thrown on its side. A piece of plywood knocked power to the Prince George's County Fire Station 44. Trees and a light pole were downed.
EF0	WNW of Quinton	New Kent	VA	37.55°N 77.2°W	1936–1938	0.5 mi (0.80 km)	50 yd (46 m)	$20,000	Two barns were destroyed, with metal debris blown 500 ft (170 yd). Multiple trees were downed.
EF0	River Road	Beaufort	NC	35.51°N 76.99°W	1945–1946	0.07 mi (0.11 km)	20 yd (18 m)	$0	The public reported a brief tornado.
EF0	E of Mechanicsville	Hanover	VA	37.6°N 77.21°W	1945–1947	4 mi (6.4 km)	50 yd (46 m)	$20,000	The section of a home's roof was ripped off and tossed 100–150 yd (91–137 m), a shed was destroyed, and numerous trees were snapped or uprooted.
EF0	WSW of Enfield	King William	VA	37.72°N 77.22°W	1958–2000	0.3 mi (0.48 km)	40 yd (37 m)	$10,000	A barn was damaged, and multiple trees were downed.
EF0	S of Chocowinity	Beaufort	NC	35.51°N 77.1°W	2038–2039	0.16 mi (0.26 km)	20 yd (18 m)	$0	Numerous trained storm spotters reported a brief tornado.
EF0	WSW of Sparta	Caroline	VA	37.99°N 77.25°W	2043–2045	0.5 mi (0.80 km)	50 yd (46 m)	$15,000	An exterior garage was destroyed, with its roof and siding blown 0.5 mi (0.80 km). Multiple trees were downed.
EF0	ENE of Manquin	King William	VA	37.71°N 77.12°W	2225–2227	0.3 mi (0.48 km)	40 yd (37 m)	$10,000	A barn was shifted slightly off its foundation, a loaded utility trailer was overturned, and many trees were downed.
EF0	WSW of Midway	King William	VA	37.74°N 77.15°W	2228–2229	0.2 mi (0.32 km)	25 yd (23 m)	$2,000	Trees were downed.
EF0	WNW of Windsor	Bertie	NC	36.03°N 77.14°W	2305–2307	0.2 mi (0.32 km)	25 yd (23 m)	$3,000	Numerous trees were downed in a swamp.
EF0	N of Middletown	Frederick	VA	39.0409°N 78.2851°W	0202–0204	0.5 mi (0.80 km)	40 yd (37 m)	$40,000	Farm outbuildings and large barns were affected, including a few that were uplifted and completely destroyed and several more that had their roofs removed. Trees were snapped and uprooted. Several 10 lb (4.5 kg) weights were deposited 40 yd (37 m) away.

=== April 23 event ===
List of confirmed tornadoes – Wednesday, April 23, 2008
EF#	Location	County / Parish	State	Start Coord.	Time (UTC)	Path length	Max width	Damage	Summary
EF0	W of Snyder	Scurry	TX	32.6855°N 101.0816°W	19:34–19:42	5.06 mi (8.14 km)	50 yd (46 m)	$10,000	A power pole was damaged.
EF1	Snyder	Scurry	TX	32.7001°N 100.9404°W	19:50–19:54	1.74 mi (2.80 km)	100 yd (91 m)	$20,000	Large trees were uprooted, a 20x40 storage building was rolled and destroyed, and metal farm buildings sustained significant damage.
EF0	S of Rotan	Fisher	TX	32.8°N 100.46°W	19:54–19:57	0.1 mi (0.16 km)	50 yd (46 m)	$0	Law enforcement reported a brief tornado.
EF0	SSE of Center	Fisher	TX	32.7°N 100.44°W	20:40–20:43	0.1 mi (0.16 km)	50 yd (46 m)	$0	Law enforcement reported a tornado.
EF0	SSE of Lamesa	Dawson	TX	32.5746°N 101.8783°W	20:45–20:46	0.37 mi (0.60 km)	50 yd (46 m)	$0	Visual confirmation of a tornado was relayed to the NWS.
EF0	SE of Lamesa	Dawson	TX	32.5664°N 101.8533°W	20:56–21:00	1.1 mi (1.8 km)	150 yd (140 m)	$0	A news personality and trained storm spotters reported a tornado.
EF0	S of Seminole	Gaines	TX	32.6861°N 102.677°W	20:56–21:02	2.57 mi (4.14 km)	200 yd (180 m)	$0	Broadcast media and emergency management confirmed a tornado.
EF0	NW of Ackerly	Dawson	TX	32.567°N 101.782°W	21:08–21:09	0.14 mi (0.23 km)	50 yd (46 m)	$0	Trained storm spotters observed a brief but well-defined tornado.
EF0	WSW of Anson	Jones	TX	32.72°N 99.94°W	21:17–21:20	0.1 mi (0.16 km)	50 yd (46 m)	$0	Anson Fire Department officials reported a tornado.
EF0	WSW of Hawley	Jones	TX	32.57°N 99.94°W	21:29–21:32	0.1 mi (0.16 km)	50 yd (46 m)	$0	A storm chaser reported a tornado.
EF0	SW of New Hope	Jones	TX	32.8505°N 99.8806°W	21:35–21:42	6.11 mi (9.83 km)	300 yd (270 m)	$12,000	A home sustained roof damage, many power poles were snapped, and tree limbs were broken.
EF0	NE of Barnsdall	Osage	OK	36.6519°N 96.068°W	22:25–22:26	0.1 mi (0.16 km)	50 yd (46 m)	$0	Multiple storm spotters reported a brief tornado over open country.
EF0	S of Patricia	Dawson	TX	32.5355°N 102.02°W	22:29–22:30	0.42 mi (0.68 km)	25 yd (23 m)	$0	Trained storm spotters reported a brief tornado.
EF0	ENE of Albany	Shackelford	TX	32.75°N 99.23°W	22:30–22:33	0.1 mi (0.16 km)	50 yd (46 m)	$0	A storm chaser reported a brief tornado.
EF1	SE of Bridgeport	Morrill	NE	41.5779°N 102.9768°W	23:32–23:52	1.5 mi (2.4 km)	350 yd (320 m)	$300,000	A home and outbuildings were heavily damaged or destroyed.
EF0	N of Big Spring	Howard	TX	32.4355°N 101.47°W	23:55–23:56	0.42 mi (0.68 km)	25 yd (23 m)	$0	Trained storm spotters reported a brief tornado.
EF0	SE of Gordon	Erath	TX	32.4702°N 98.3357°W	23:56–23:59	2.24 mi (3.60 km)	50 yd (46 m)	$20,000	A shed, a mobile homes, and tree limbs were damaged.
EF0	W of Lipan	Erath, Palo Pinto	TX	32.46°N 98.2115°W	23:58–00:09	7.18 mi (11.56 km)	125 yd (114 m)	$50,000	Large trees were snapped and the roofs of structures were damaged.
EF0	Granbury	Hood	TX	32.4912°N 97.8626°W	00:40–00:42	1.4 mi (2.3 km)	40 yd (37 m)	$60,000	The underpinning of a house was damaged, while fences and a gazebo were destroyed. Railroad ties were bent over. A well house was damaged and its plumbing tanks were ripped from the ground. A greenhouse and numerous outbuildings were damaged Numerous trees were damaged.
EF2	W of Burleson	Tarrant	TX	32.5603°N 97.4108°W	02:35–02:40	0.31 mi (0.50 km)	100 yd (91 m)	$1,000,000	Two homes lost significant portions of their roofs and sustained damage to their external walls. An additional two houses had portions of roof decking removed. Several metal storage buildings were destroyed, nearby trees had large limbs broken off, and other homes sustained minor roof damage.

=== April 24 event ===
List of confirmed tornadoes – Thursday, April 24, 2008
EF#	Location	County / Parish	State	Start Coord.	Time (UTC)	Path length	Max width	Damage	Summary
EF0	N of Challis	Custer	ID	44.529°N 114.23°W	2130–2134	0.12 mi (0.19 km)	20 yd (18 m)	$1,000	A home had its roof ripped off and destroyed.
EF0	SW of Gerled	Kossuth	IA	43.35°N 94.22°W	2147	0.1 mi (0.16 km)	30 yd (27 m)	$0	Law enforcement reported a tornado over an open area.
EF0	W of Blairsburg	Hamilton	IA	42.49°N 93.71°W	0121–0124	1.68 mi (2.70 km)	50 yd (46 m)	$50,000	Three farmsteads and trees sustained minor damage.
EF0	E of Stockton	Rooks	KS	39.38°N 99.27°W	0342	0.1 mi (0.16 km)	25 yd (23 m)	$0	A storm chaser reported a brief tornado.
EF0	S of Woodston	Rooks	KS	39.4°N 99.1°W	0350	0.1 mi (0.16 km)	10 yd (9.1 m)	$0	A storm chaser reported a brief tornado.

=== April 25 event ===
List of confirmed tornadoes – Friday, April 25, 2008
EF#	Location	County / Parish	State	Start Coord.	Time (UTC)	Path length	Max width	Damage	Summary
EF2	N of Beloit to S of Jamestown	Mitchell, Cloud	KS	39.5236°N 98.1295°W	0523–0558	14.08 mi (22.66 km)	1,050 yd (960 m)	$1,250,000	Several homes, farmsteads, outbuildings, power poles, and trees were damaged.
EF1	Johnson	Nehama	NE	40.41°N 96°W	0523–0558	0.33 mi (0.53 km)	100 yd (91 m)	$100,000	Several buildings had their roofing material and facade peeled or collapsed. Trees were snapped, two garages were pushed off their foundations, and a garage door was blown in beside a fire station.
EF0	ENE of Hollis	Cloud	KS	39.64°N 97.52°W	0626–0627	0.1 mi (0.16 km)	25 yd (23 m)	$0	A trained storm spotter reported a brief tornado.
EF0	W of Floris	Davis	IA	40.85°N 92.42°W	1835–1837	0.81 mi (1.30 km)	30 yd (27 m)	$25,000	Trees were downed, a roof was ripped off, and a garage may have been flattened.
EF1	Winfield	Henry	IA	41.1318°N 91.4477°W	2008–2010	1.3 mi (2.1 km)	20 yd (18 m)	$10,000	A tornado touched down at the Twin Lakes Golf Course, damaging a wind mill. A machine shed at a nearby farm had its north and east walls blown out. A wooden fence was toppled, power poles were snapped, and several trees were snapped or uprooted.
EF2	NW of Muscatine	Muscatine	IA	41.5317°N 91.2648°W	2015–2025	6.5 mi (10.5 km)	150 yd (140 m)	$200,000	Five farmsteads were impacted. Two homes had their shingles and siding peeled off. Outbuildings were damaged, a machine shed and a grain bin were destroyed, and a wooden swing-set was toppled. Utility poles and trees were snapped, uprooted, or downed.
EF0	SW of Kettle Falls	Ferry	WA	48.5026°N 118.2°W	2143–2145	0.1 mi (0.16 km)	20 yd (18 m)	$0	Law enforcement reported a tornado.
EF1	S of Portage to SE of Markesan	Columbia, Green Lake	WI	43.4618°N 89.4164°W	2218–2254	28.17 mi (45.34 km)	75 yd (69 m)	$600,000	Trees were snapped and uprooted. Four residential homes sustained minor damage, while one home sustained major damage. Three farm buildings were destroyed, two suffered major damage and two sustained minor damage. Power lines were downed.
EF0	WSW of Wyocena	Columbia	WI	43.4786°N 89.371°W	2220–2221	0.24 mi (0.39 km)	25 yd (23 m)	$0	Some damage to tree branches was noted.
EF0	S of Belton	Bell	TX	31.0497°N 97.4783°W	2320–2328	1.4 mi (2.3 km)	50 yd (46 m)	$0	Broadcast media reported a brief tornado.
EF0	W of Holland	Bell	TX	30.8881°N 97.457°W	2347–2348	0.73 mi (1.17 km)	50 yd (46 m)	$0	A television meteorologist reported a brief tornado.

=== April 26 event ===
List of confirmed tornadoes – Saturday, April 26, 2008
EF#	Location	County / Parish	State	Start Coord.	Time (UTC)	Path length	Max width	Damage	Summary
EF0	SW of Perryton	Ochiltree	TX	36.3898°N 100.8127°W	1930–1935	0.1 mi (0.16 km)	20 yd (18 m)	$0	Law enforcement reported a landspout tornado over open fields.

=== April 28 event ===
List of confirmed tornadoes – Monday, April 28, 2008
EF#	Location	County / Parish	State	Start Coord.	Time (UTC)	Path length	Max width	Damage	Summary
EF0	W of Kings Mountain	Cleveland	NC	35.234°N 81.398°W	13:30	0.1 mi (0.16 km)	40 yd (37 m)	$20,000	Several mobile homes had their skirting ripped off while others sustained damage to their roofs; one was blown off its blocks. A metal utility building was damaged and several trees were downed, including one that fell across three vehicles.
EF0	Dekle Beach	Taylor	FL	29.8493°N 83.6203°W	17:06–17:08	0.32 mi (0.51 km)	30 yd (27 m)	$75,000	Three homes sustained major roof damage while several other homes sustained minor damage to their porches, screens, and windows. Power was knocked out throughout the city.
EF1	Virgilina	Halifax	VA	36.5434°N 78.7868°W	17:10–17:15	0.92 mi (1.48 km)	240 yd (220 m)	$500,000	Six homes were damaged, and numerous large trees were toppled or snapped.
EF0	WNW of Live Oak	Suwannee	FL	30.3269°N 83.0311°W	18:25	0.1 mi (0.16 km)	50 yd (46 m)	Unknown	Houses were damaged, including a mobile home that had a portion of its roof removed.
EF1	SE of Lawrenceville to W of Jarratt	Brunswick, Greensville	VA	36.7295°N 77.8045°W	18:48–18:58	16 mi (26 km)	250 yd (230 m)	$705,000	A long-tracked tornado snapped or uprooted numerous trees, destroyed a mobile home, and inflicted roof and siding damage to several houses.
EF1	Colonial Heights	Colonial Heights (C), Prince George	VA	37.2444°N 77.3977°W	19:40–19:45	1 mi (1.6 km)	80 yd (73 m)	$2,015,000	A football field clubhouse had a portion of its roof ripped off. The Medallion Pools building had metal ripped off which then damaged a few nearby vehicles. A half-ton air conditioning unit was blown 300 yd (270 m). At the Dimmock Square Strip Mall, a string of four stores had ceiling tiles blown out, their roofs peeled off, and windows blown out. Cars were flipped and tossed into piles. Light poles were downed, while a bank and several homes sustained damage. Twenty-one people were injured.
EF1	SE of Emporia	Greensville	VA	36.5837°N 77.4267°W	19:50–19:55	2 mi (3.2 km)	50 yd (46 m)	$15,000	Numerous trees were snapped or toppled, and a few outbuildings were damaged.
EF3	Suffolk to Naval Station Norfolk	Suffolk (C), Portsmouth (C), Norfolk (C)	VA	36.7102°N 76.6872°W	20:05–20:40	24 mi (39 km)	400 yd (370 m)	$3,160,000	A significant tornado began near Suffolk, moving through Portsmouth and the Naval Station Norfolk before dissipating. At least a dozen homes were destroyed while many other homes and businesses were damaged. An elementary school was damaged, while a strip mall at the Freedom Plaza shopping center was destroyed. Numerous cars were tossed in the center, including one that was impaled into a building. Numerous trees were snapped or uprooted. A total of 200 people were injured.
EF0	Capron	Southampton	VA	36.7045°N 77.2048°W	20:10–20:15	0.3 mi (0.48 km)	30 yd (27 m)	$5,000	Several trees were downed or snapped.
EF1	Claremont	Surry	VA	37.2179°N 76.9715°W	20:18–20:22	0.3 mi (0.48 km)	30 yd (27 m)	$74,000	A double-wide mobile home was destroyed, and numerous trees were snapped or downed.
EF0	NW of Jamestown	James City	VA	37.2614°N 76.8571°W	20:35–20:40	0.5 mi (0.80 km)	50 yd (46 m)	$200,000	Homes sustained minor damage, and several trees were snapped or uprooted.
EF1	Carrsville	Isle of Wight	VA	36.6821°N 76.8713°W	20:40–20:45	3 mi (4.8 km)	50 yd (46 m)	$184,000	Six agricultural buildings and eleven homes were damaged.
EF1	Bohannon	Mathews	VA	37.3857°N 76.3681°W	20:45–20:47	0.3 mi (0.48 km)	50 yd (46 m)	$50,000	A home had its roof ripped off, a boat and a vehicle were overturned, and many trees were downed.
EF0	WNW of Bohannon	Gloucester, Mathews	VA	37.3904°N 76.5883°W	20:55–21:10	11 mi (18 km)	50 yd (46 m)	$20,000	The roof was ripped off a barn and partially removed from a convenience store. A shed was destroyed, and several trees were snapped or downed.
EF0	NE of Belhaven	Beaufort	NC	35.57°N 76.54°W	21:25–21:26	0.18 mi (0.29 km)	20 yd (18 m)	$0	The public reported a brief tornado.
EF0	N of Scranton	Hyde	NC	35.56°N 76.43°W	21:40–21:41	0.05 mi (0.080 km)	20 yd (18 m)	$0	A waterspout began over the Pungo River and moved ashore.

== See also ==
- Tornadoes of 2008
- List of United States tornadoes from January to February 2008

== Footnotes ==
This article incorporates quotations from public domain descriptions from the NOAA website.
