= National Register of Historic Places listings in Clinton County, Kentucky =

Location of Clinton County in Kentucky

This is a list of the National Register of Historic Places listings in Clinton County, Kentucky.

It is intended to be a complete list of the properties on the National Register of Historic Places in Clinton County, Kentucky, United States. The locations of National Register properties for which the latitude and longitude coordinates are included below, may be seen in a map.

There are 2 properties listed on the National Register in the county.

This National Park Service list is complete through NPS recent listings posted December 12, 2025.

== Current listings ==
	Name on the Register	Image	Date listed	Location	City or town	Description
1	Judge Killis Huddleston House	Judge Killis Huddleston House	January 28, 1994 (#93001583)	Junction of U.S. Route 127 and Kentucky Route 734; 36°44′18″N 85°08′08″W	Albany	
2	Jesse Noland House	Jesse Noland House	October 6, 2003 (#03000711)	RR1, Kentucky Route 969; 36°38′56″N 85°05′50″W	Albany	

== See also ==
- List of National Historic Landmarks in Kentucky
- National Register of Historic Places listings in Kentucky
