= Aaron, Kentucky =

Unincorporated community in Kentucky, United States

Aaron
- Unincorporated community
- Location within Kentucky
- Coordinates: 36°48′45″N 85°10′51″W
- Country: United States
- State: Kentucky
- County: Clinton
- Elevation: 1,056 ft (322 m)
- Time zone: UTC-6 (Central (CST))
  - Summer (DST): UTC-5 (CDT)
- Area code: 606
- GNIS feature ID: 507367

Aaron is an unincorporated community in Clinton County, in the U.S. state of Kentucky.

== History ==
A post office was established at Aaron in 1908, and remained in operation until it was discontinued in 1990. Adison Aaron, the first postmaster, gave the community his name.

Garlin Murl Conner (1919–1998), recipient of the Medal of Honor, was born in Aaron.
