= Bug, Kentucky =

Unincorporated community in Kentucky, United States

Bug
- Unincorporated community
- Location within the state of Kentucky Bug (the United States)
- Coordinates: 36°39′17″N 85°6′33″W
- Country: United States
- State: Kentucky
- County: Clinton
- Elevation: 823 ft (251 m)
- Time zone: UTC-6 (Central (CST))
  - Summer (DST): UTC-5 (CDT)
- GNIS feature ID: 488337

Bug is an unincorporated community located in Clinton County, Kentucky, United States. Its post office is closed.

The origin of the name "Bug" is obscure.
