= Decide, Kentucky =

Unincorporated community in Kentucky, United States

Decide
- Unincorporated community
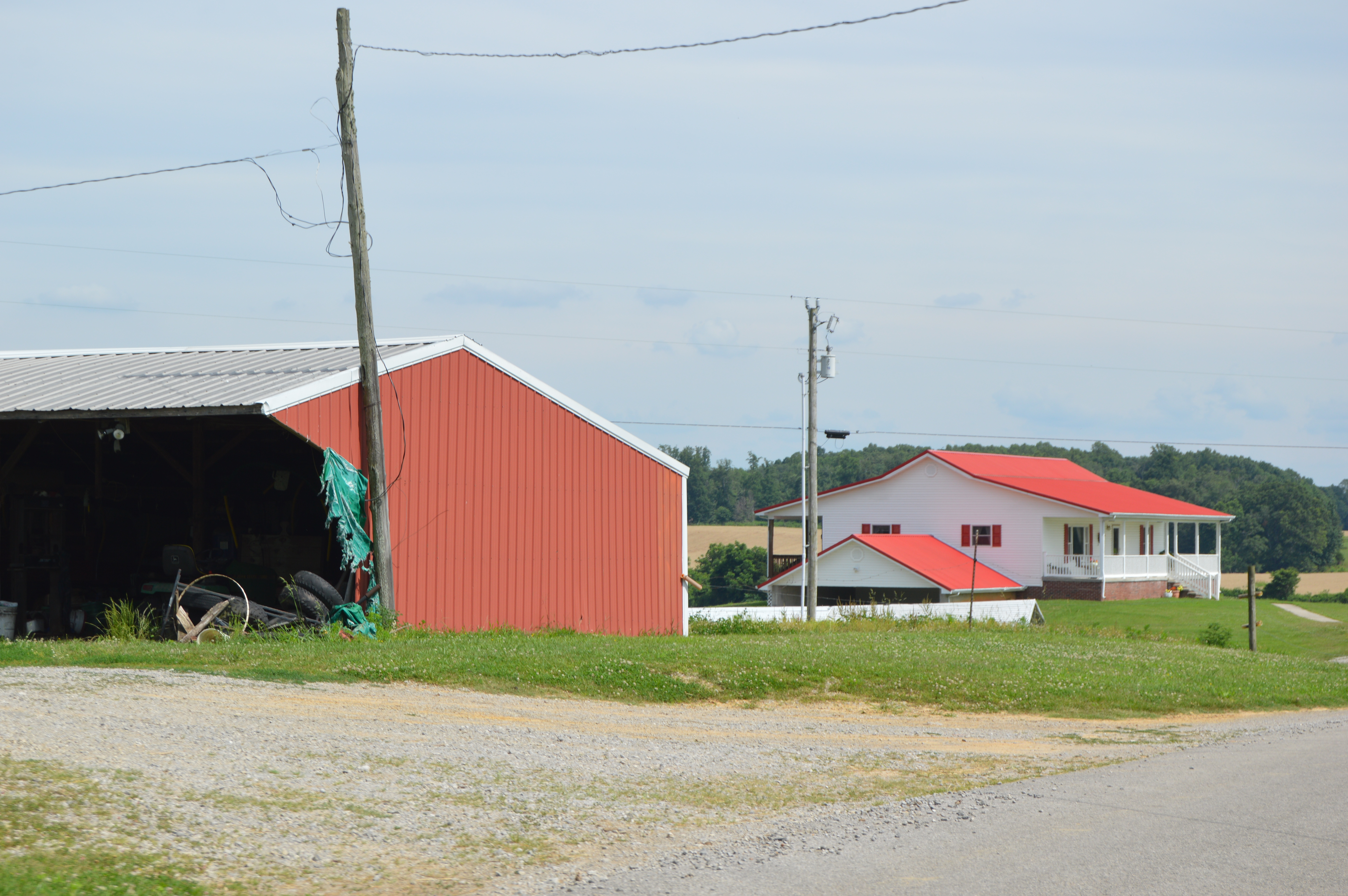
- Farmstead at the site

- Location within the state of Kentucky Decide (the United States)
- Coordinates: 36°46′24″N 85°12′15″W
- Country: United States
- State: Kentucky
- County: Clinton
- Elevation: 1,020 ft (310 m)
- Time zone: UTC-6 (Central (CST))
  - Summer (DST): UTC-5 (CDT)
- GNIS feature ID: 507831

Decide is an unincorporated community within Clinton County, Kentucky, United States. Its post office is closed.
