= Garlin Murl Conner =

US Army officer

- Garlin Murl Conner in approximately 1945
- Born: 2 June 1919; Aaron, Kentucky, U.S.
- Died: 5 November 1998 (aged 79); Albany, Kentucky, U.S.
- Burial place: Memorial Hill Cemetery, Albany, Kentucky, U.S.
- Military career
- Allegiance: United States
- Branch: United States Army
- Service years: 1941–1945
- Rank: First Lieutenant
- Units: L Company, 3rd Battalion, 7th Infantry Regiment, 3rd Infantry Division
- Conflicts: World War II: Battle of Anzio
- Awards: Medal of Honor; Silver Star (4); Bronze Star; Purple Heart (3); French Croix de guerre

Garlin Murl Conner (2 June 1919 – 5 November 1998) was a United States Army technical sergeant and first lieutenant in the Second World War. He was awarded the Distinguished Service Cross, four Silver Stars, Bronze Star, and the French Croix de guerre for his heroic actions in Italy and France during the war. During his campaigns, he was wounded three times. His Distinguished Service Cross was upgraded to the Medal of Honor, after a 22-year effort that began shortly before his death. President Trump presented the medal to his widow, Lyda Pauline Conner, in a ceremony in the East Room of the White House on 26 June 2018.

== Early life ==
Conner was born on 2 June 1919 on Indian Creek, a tributary of the Cumberland River in Clinton County, served by the Aaron, Kentucky post office. He was the third child of 11 brothers and sisters. He and four of his brothers served during World War II. He stood at 5 ft 6 in (168 cm).

== Military service ==
Conner, who was generally known by his middle name, which he originally spelled "Merle," was a selectee for the military and entered the U.S. Army on 1 March 1941 in Louisville, Kentucky. He completed his basic training at Fort Lewis, Washington where he became a member of K Company, 3rd Battalion, 7th Infantry Regiment, 3rd Infantry Division. After training with his division at Fort Lewis, he was sent with the 3rd Infantry Division to Camp Ord, California and Fort Pickett, Virginia for further combat training.

On 23 October 1942, Conner and his division departed the United States from Norfolk, Virginia, to fight in the European-African-Middle Eastern theater of operations arriving on 8 November for the invasion of French North Africa. He participated in four amphibious assault landings and eight campaigns including the Anzio Campaign in Italy during which he earned his second Silver Star (Bronze Oak Leaf Cluster). He was promoted to technical sergeant on 13 January 1944. He was commissioned a second lieutenant on 28 June 1944. On 29 December 1944, he was promoted to first lieutenant.

Conner was awarded four Silver Stars for gallantry in action: in October 1943, 30 January 1944, 11 September 1944, and 3 February 1945. He was also awarded the Bronze Star Medal, and at least three Purple Hearts for being wounded in action on 6 March 1944, in August, and in September 1944. He said he was wounded seven times, but the number of Purple Hearts cannot be confirmed because his military records were destroyed in a fire at the St. Louis records center in 1973. He was presented the Distinguished Service Cross from Lieutenant General Alexander Patch, the Commander of the Seventh Army, for extraordinary heroism during a German counterattack with six tanks and 600 infantrymen on 24 January 1945, near Houssen, France. Recently returned to his unit from the hospital, intelligence staff officer Lt. Conner volunteered to go forward to direct artillery fire against the German counterattack. The enemy got so close that Lt. Conner had to call artillery fire directly on his own position, leading to the death of more than 50 Germans and stopping the assault.

In March 1945, Conner was sent back to the U.S. and was honorably discharged on 22 June 1945. He was honored in an event in Albany, Kentucky in May 1945, at which Alvin C. York of nearby Pall Mall, Tennessee, the most noted Medal of Honor winner of World War I, was a speaker.

== Post-military and death ==
Conner married Lyda Pauline Wells on 9 July 1945.

After the war, the Conners lived on Indian Creek several miles north of Albany, near the Cumberland River, in a home with no electricity or running water, on a farm worked with mules and horses. In 1950 the U.S. government bought their property for the impoundment of Lake Cumberland and they moved to the Rolan community in southeastern Clinton County, Kentucky. They had one son, Paul, one grandson, and three granddaughters. Conner continued farming and was president of the Clinton County Farm Bureau for 17 years. He was active in various veterans' organizations including the Paralyzed Veterans of America and the Disabled American Veterans, and traveled to many nearby counties for the Kentucky Disabled Ex-Servicemen's Board to assist veterans and their dependents with claims for benefits due them as a result of military service. He was handicapped from his war wounds, heart disease and Parkinson's Disease.

Conner died in 1998, and was buried in Memorial Hill Cemetery in Albany. In 2012, the U.S. Army honored him by designating a portion of a new maintenance facility at Fort Benning, Georgia as Conner Hall.

== Military awards ==
Conner's military decorations and awards:

Combat Infantryman Badge
Medal of Honor
| Silver Star w/ three Bronze Oak Leaf Clusters | Bronze Star Medal | Purple Heart w/ two Bronze Oak Leaf Clusters |
| Army Good Conduct Medal | American Defense Service Medal | American Campaign Medal |
| European-African-Middle Eastern Campaign Medal w/ Arrowhead device, 3/16" silver star, and three 3/16" bronze stars | World War II Victory Medal | French Croix de Guerre |

Presidential Unit Citation w/ one bronze oak leaf cluster

- French Fourragère (Note: Normally the fourragère requires two cites. The 3rd Infantry Division was cited one time and awarded the fourragère.) (Unit award)

== Medal of Honor campaign ==
In 1996, Army veteran Richard Chilton of Genoa City, Wis., was gathering information about the World War II service of his uncle, Pfc. Gordon W. Roberts, who served with Conner in combat and was killed in action at Anzio on 31 January 1944. He heard of Conner's exploits, met him and saw the medals he had earned, and began efforts to have Conner's Distinguished Service Cross for his valor on 24 January 1945 upgraded to the Medal of Honor. His campaign was picked up by Walton R. "Chip" Haddix of Albany, Ky., who had known Conner for many years but knew nothing of his Army record until 2000, when Louisville Courier-Journal columnist Byron Crawford wrote about Chilton's efforts.

Through pictures, medals, and testimony of Conner's superiors, including Maj. Gen. Lloyd B. Ramsey, then a colonel, the story of Conner's heroic actions more than 50 years earlier in France came back to life. Early on 24 January 1945, Ramsey needed a volunteer for a dangerous and life-threatening mission: act as a forward observer to direct artillery fire to stop a German attack that was threatening to overrun their position. Conner and another soldier, Robert Dutil, grabbed a spool of telephone wire and took off toward the front, amid intense enemy fire. They ran 300 to 400 yards and Conner made it to a shallow irrigation ditch, where he stayed in contact with his unit for three hours in near-zero-degree weather as a ferocious onslaught of German tanks and infantry bore down on him. Chilton stated in 2015, "My God, he held off 600 Germans and six tanks coming right at him. When they got too close, his commander told him to vacate and instead, he says, 'Blanket my position.'" The request meant Conner was calling for artillery strikes as he was being overrun, risking his life in order to draw friendly fire that would take out the enemy, too, during which time he directed his men for three hours by telephone. During the action, Conner killed 50 German soldiers with artillery fire and his companion was wounded. Lt. Harold Wigetman a member of the 3rd Battalion, 7th Infantry, credited Conner with saving the battalion.

There is no doubt that Lt. Conner should have been awarded the Medal of Honor for his actions. One of the most disappointing regrets of my career is not having the Medal of Honor awarded to the most outstanding soldier I've ever had the privilege of commanding.

— Maj. Gen. Lloyd B. Ramsey, Ret.

The Army denied requests for the change of award, saying it was too late, so Pauline Conner sued the Army in federal court. In March 2014, U.S. District Judge Thomas B. Russell ruled that Pauline had waited too long to submit her most recent request. She appealed to the 6th Circuit Court of Appeals, which ordered the parties into mediation. The Army's Board for Correction of Military Records recommended Conner for the Medal of Honor.

To ensure that the Army promptly implemented the correction board's recommendation, the National Defense Authorization Act for Fiscal Year 2018 included an amendment waiving the time limit to award the Medal of Honor to Conner for his 24 January 1945 actions. On 29 March 2018, The White House announced that President Trump would present the Medal of Honor posthumously to Conner; the presentation took place in the East Room of the White House on 26 June 2018.

Comparisons have often been made between Conner's actions and those that earned Audie Murphy the Medal of Honor two days later and five miles away. Murphy, one of the most decorated soldiers of World War II, also served in the 3rd Infantry Division. The Murphy family asked Haddix in a letter (written by spokesperson Coy Prather) on 26 June 2018, to cease such comparisons and not mention Murphy in any connection with Conner. Haddix agreed.

== Medal of Honor citation ==
First Lieutenant Garlin M. Conner distinguished himself by acts of gallantry and intrepidity while serving with Company K, 3d Battalion, 7th Infantry Regiment, 3d Infantry Division. On the morning of January 24, 1945, near the town of Houssen, France, German forces ferociously counterattacked the front left flank of the 7th Infantry Regiment with 600 infantry troops, six Mark VI tanks, and tank destroyers. Lieutenant Conner, having recently returned to his unit after recovering from a wound received in an earlier battle, was working as the Intelligence Officer in the 3d Battalion Command Post at the time of the attack. Understanding the devastating effect that the advancing enemy armor could have on the Battalion, Lieutenant Conner immediately volunteered to run straight into the heart of the enemy assault to get to a position from which he could direct friendly artillery on the advancing enemy forces. With complete disregard for his own safety, Lieutenant Conner maneuvered 400 yards through enemy artillery fire that destroyed trees in his path and rained shrapnel all around him, while unrolling telephone wire needed to communicate with the Battalion command post. Upon reaching the Battalion’s front line, he continued to move forward under the enemy assault to a position 30 yards in front of the defending United States forces, where he plunged into a shallow ditch that provided minimal protection from the advancing enemy’s heavy machine gun and small arms fire. With rounds impacting all around him, Lieutenant Conner calmly directed multiple fire missions, adjusting round after round of artillery from his prone position, until the enemy was forced to halt its advance and seek cover behind a nearby dike. For three hours, Lieutenant Conner remained in this compromised position, enduring the repeated onslaught of German infantry which, at one point, advanced to within five yards of his position. As German infantry regrouped and began to mass in an overwhelming assault, Lieutenant Conner ordered friendly artillery to concentrate directly on his own position, having resolved to die if necessary to destroy the enemy advance. Ignoring the friendly artillery shells blanketing his position and exploding mere feet from him, Lieutenant Conner continued to direct artillery fire on the enemy assault swarming around him until the German attack was finally broken. By his heroism and disregard for his own life, Lieutenant Conner stopped the enemy advance. The artillery he expertly directed, while under constant enemy fire, killed approximately fifty German soldiers and wounded an estimated one hundred more, preventing what would have undoubtedly been heavy friendly casualties. His actions are in keeping with the highest traditions of military service and reflect great credit upon himself, the 3d Infantry Division, and the United States Army.
