= Lettered Oak, Kentucky =

Unincorporated community in Kentucky, United States

Lettered Oak
- Unincorporated community
- Location within the state of Kentucky Lettered Oak (the United States)
- Coordinates: 36°39′14″N 85°13′53″W
- Country: United States
- State: Kentucky
- County: Clinton
- Elevation: 1,024 ft (312 m)
- Time zone: UTC-6 (Central (CST))
  - Summer (DST): UTC-5 (CDT)
- GNIS feature ID: 2742095

Lettered Oak was an unincorporated community within Clinton County, Kentucky, United States.
