= Jesse Noland House =

Historic house in Kentucky, United States

- U.S. National Register of Historic Places
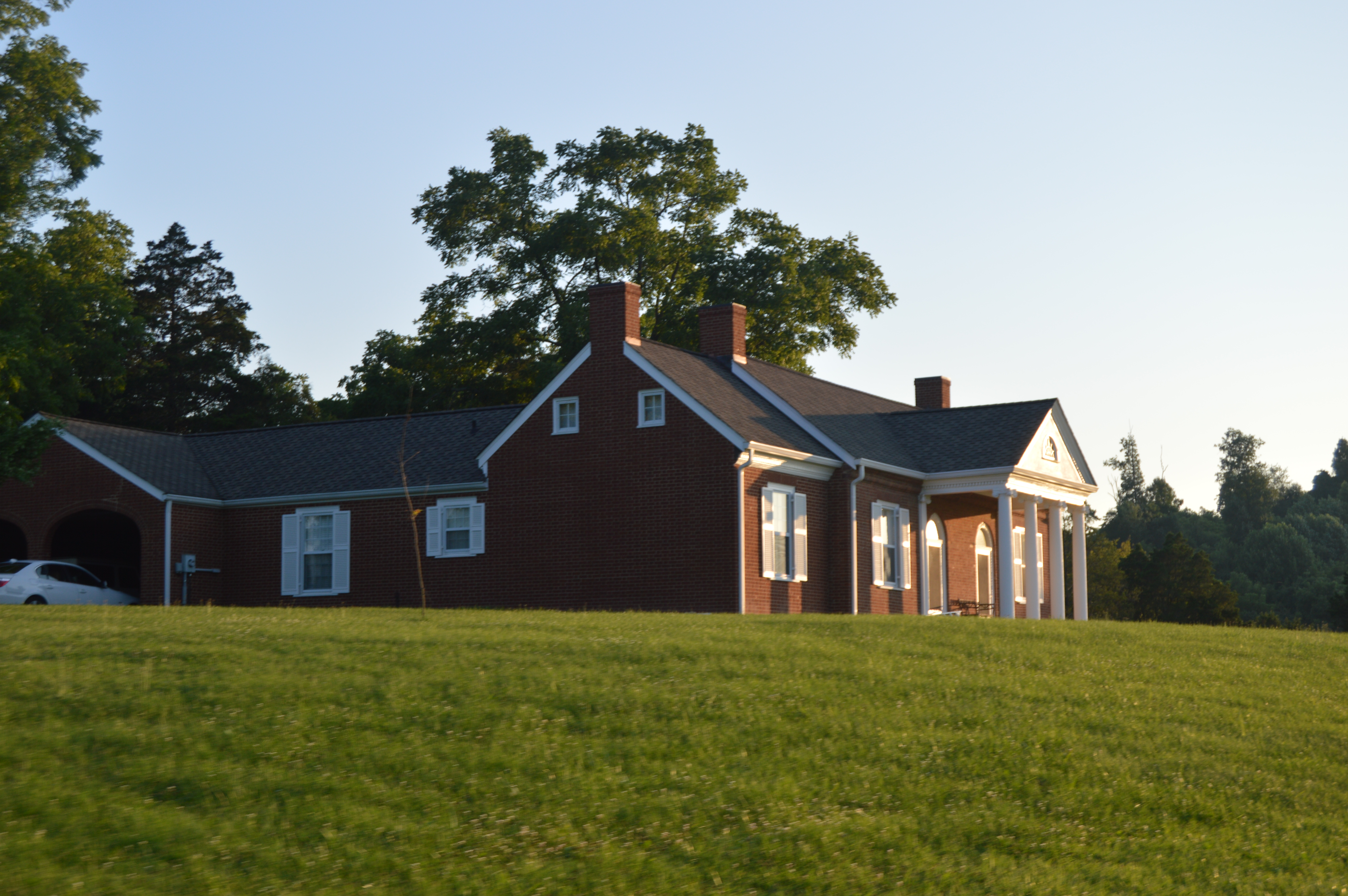

- Location within Kentucky Location within the United States
- Location: RR1 KY 969, Albany, Kentucky
- Area: 10 acres (4.0 ha)
- Built: 1822-28
- Architectural style: Federal
- NRHP reference No.: 03000711
- Added to NRHP: October 6, 2003

The Jesse Noland House, located on Kentucky Route 969 in Clinton County, Kentucky, southeast of Albany, Kentucky, is a Federal-style brick house built during 1822 to 1828 for Jesse and Matilda Noland. It was listed on the National Register of Historic Places in 2003.

Its National Register nomination notes that when it was completed "it stood as one of the most elegant and uniquely designed buildings of the region, which became Clinton County in 1836. It is also one of the few examples of residential building of the early settlement period that has survived the tests of time, being one of only two brick houses from the antebellum years still conserved in the area."
