= Alpha, Kentucky =

Unincorporated community in Kentucky, United States

Alpha is an unincorporated community in Clinton County, Kentucky, United States.

== History ==
The name comes from Alpha E. Davis, the community's second postmaster.

== Geography ==
The community is located near the Wayne County line along Kentucky Route 90 northeast of the city of Albany, the county seat of Clinton County. Its elevation is 1,014 feet (309 m), and it is located at 36°45′44″N 85°0′37″W.

== Post office ==
Alpha has a post office with the ZIP code 42603.
