= Judge Killis Huddleston House =

Historic house in Kentucky, United States

- U.S. National Register of Historic Places
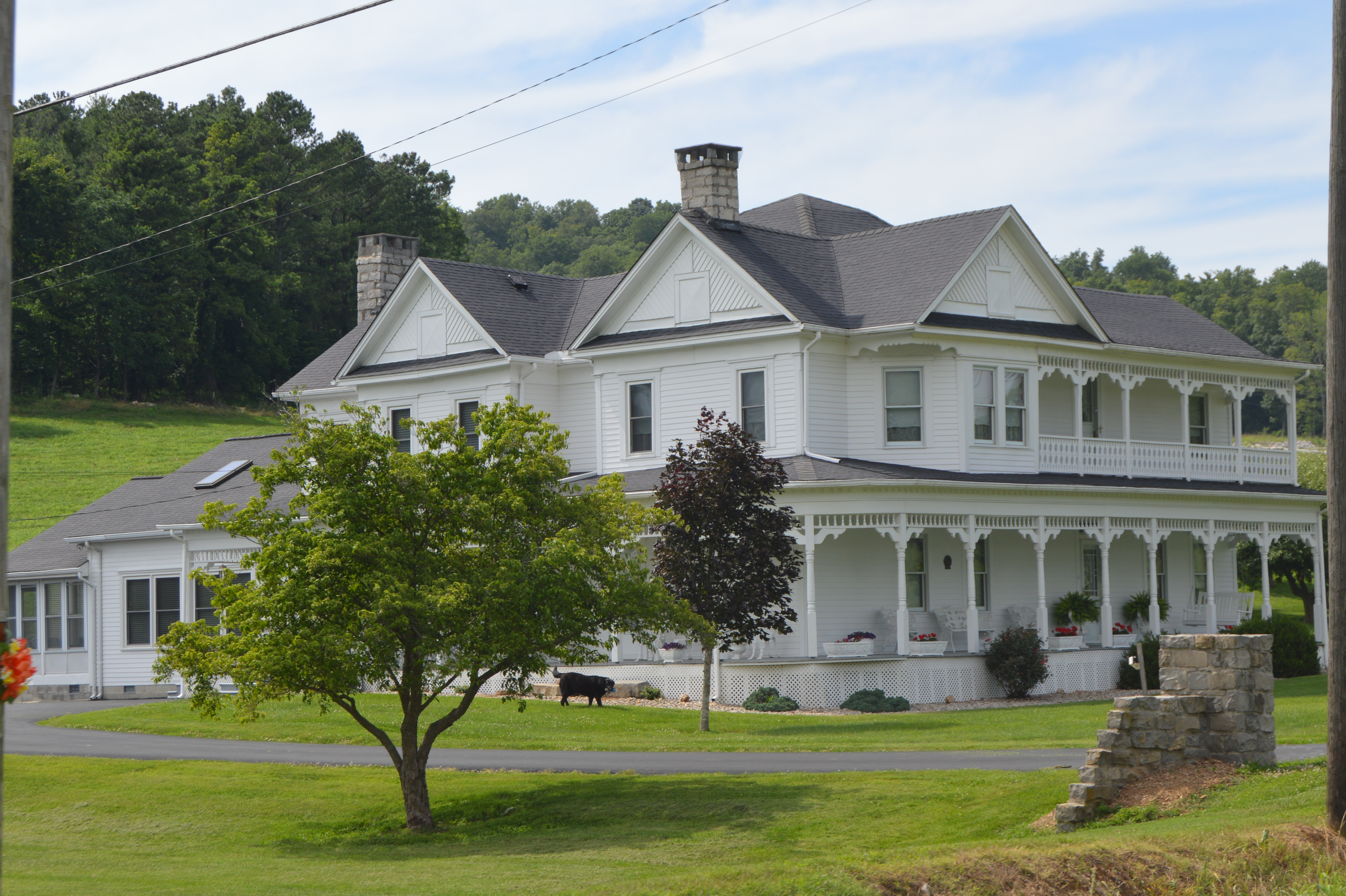

- Location within Kentucky Location within the United States
- Nearest city: Albany, Kentucky
- Coordinates: 36°44′18″N 85°08′08″W
- Area: less than one acre
- Built: c.1900
- Built by: Burchett, Preacher Joseph
- Architectural style: Italianate
- NRHP reference No.: 93001583
- Added to NRHP: January 28, 1994

The Judge Killis Huddleston House, near Albany, Kentucky, is an Italianate house which was built in c.1900. It was listed on the National Register of Historic Places in 1994.

It is a T-plan wood frame two-story farmhouse with a wraparound porch.

It is located at the junction of U.S. Route 127 and Kentucky Route 734, about 3 miles (4.8 km) north of Albany.
