= Bohannon, Virginia =

Unincorporated community in Virginia, United States

- Unincorporated community
- Location within Virginia Location within the United States
- Coordinates: 37°23′48″N 76°21′36″W
- Country: United States
- State: Virginia
- County: Mathews
- Elevation: 7 ft (2.1 m)
- Time zone: UTC-5 (Eastern (EST))
  - Summer (DST): UTC-4 (EDT)
- ZIP code: 23021
- Area code: 804
- GNIS feature ID: 1495283

Bohannon is an unincorporated community in Mathews County, Virginia, United States. Bohannon is 3.5 miles (5.6 km) southwest of Mathews. Bohannon has a post office with ZIP code 23064.
