= Matthews, Georgia =

- Unincorporated community Census-designated place
- Location within Georgia Location within the United States
- Coordinates: 33°12′40″N 82°18′27″W
- Country: United States
- State: Georgia
- County: Jefferson

Area
  - Total: 3.53 sq mi (9.15 km^{2})
  - Land: 3.52 sq mi (9.12 km^{2})
  - Water: 0.012 sq mi (0.03 km^{2})
- Elevation: 390 ft (120 m)

Population (2020)
  - Total: 146
  - Density: 41.5/sq mi (16.01/km^{2})
- Time zone: UTC-5 (Eastern (EST))
  - Summer (DST): UTC-4 (EDT)
- ZIP code: 30818
- Area code: 706
- GNIS feature ID: 332331

Matthews is a census-designated place and unincorporated community in Jefferson County, Georgia, United States. Its population was 146 as of the 2020 census. Georgia State Route 88 passes through the community.

== Demographics ==
Historical population
Census	Pop.	Note	%±
2010	150		—
2020	146		−2.7%
1980-2000; 2010 2020

Matthews was first listed as a census designated place in the 2010 U.S. census.

Matthews, Georgia – Racial and ethnic composition Note: the US Census treats Hispanic/Latino as an ethnic category. This table excludes Latinos from the racial categories and assigns them to a separate category. Hispanics/Latinos may be of any race.
Race / Ethnicity (NH = Non-Hispanic)	Pop 2010	Pop 2020	% 2010	% 2020
White alone (NH)	99	102	66.00%	69.86%
Black or African American alone (NH)	43	41	28.67%	28.08%
Native American or Alaska Native alone (NH)	0	0	0.00%	0.00%
Asian alone (NH)	0	0	0.00%	0.00%
Pacific Islander alone (NH)	0	0	0.00%	0.00%
Some Other Race alone (NH)	0	0	0.00%	0.00%
Mixed Race or Multi-Racial (NH)	0	1	0.00%	0.68%
Hispanic or Latino (any race)	8	2	5.33%	1.37%
Total	150	146	100.00%	100.00%
