= Clinton County, Kentucky =

County in Kentucky, United States

- County
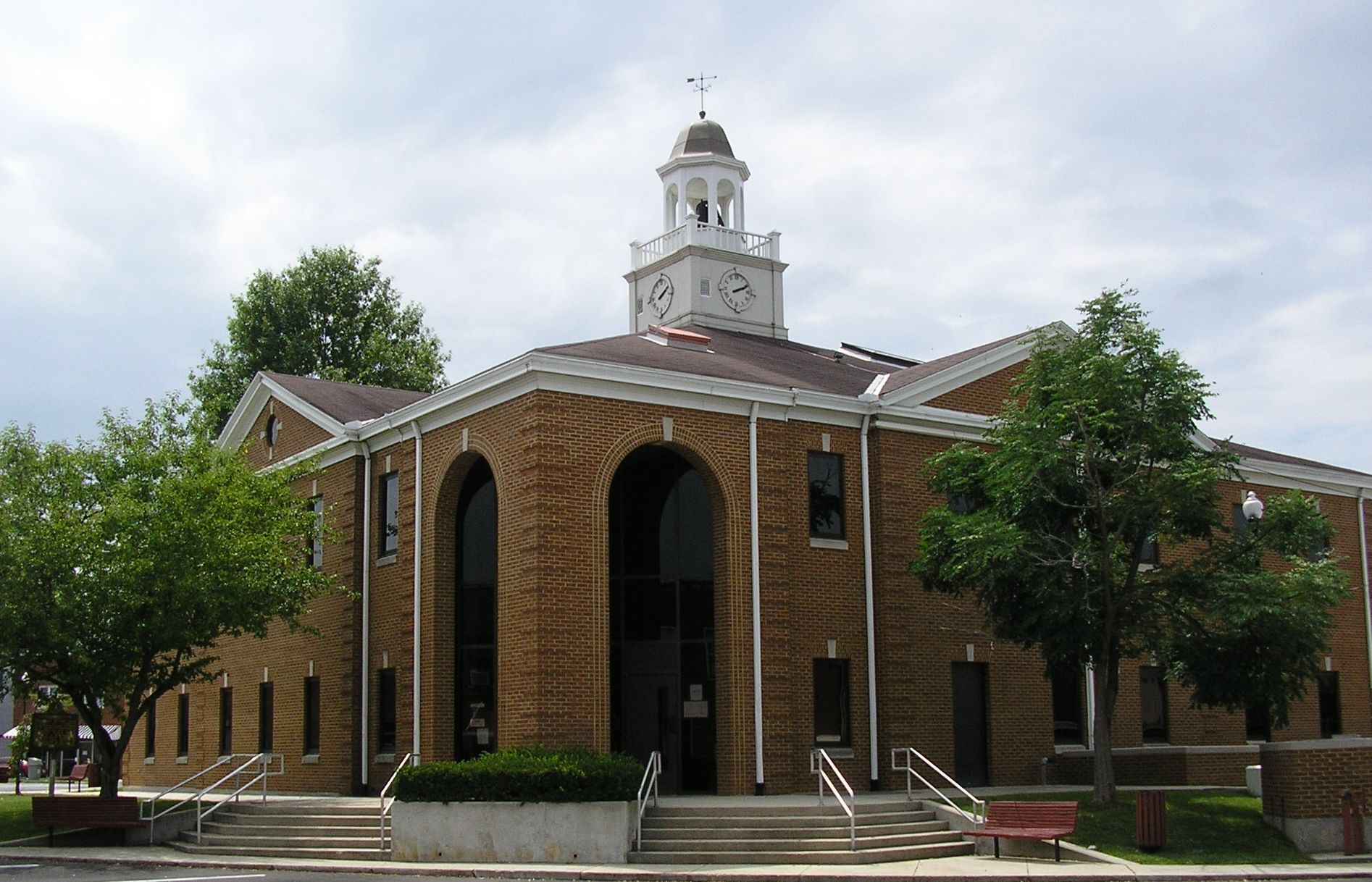
- Clinton County courthouse in Albany

- Location within the U.S. state of Kentucky
- Coordinates: 36°43′N 85°08′W
- Country: United States
- State: Kentucky
- Founded: February 20, 1835
- Named for: DeWitt Clinton
- Seat: Albany
- Largest city: Albany

Government
  - Judge/Executive: Ricky Craig (R)

Area
  - Total: 205 sq mi (530 km^{2})
  - Land: 197 sq mi (510 km^{2})
  - Water: 8.2 sq mi (21 km^{2}) 4.0%

Population (2020)
  - Total: 9,253
  - Estimate (2025): 9,139 ▼
  - Density: 47.0/sq mi (18.1/km^{2})
- Time zone: UTC−6 (Central)
  - Summer (DST): UTC−5 (CDT)
- Congressional district: 1st
- Website: clintoncounty.ky.gov

Clinton County is a county located in the U.S. state of Kentucky in the Pennyrile Region along the southern border with Tennessee. As of the 2020 United States census, the population was 9,253. Its county seat is Albany. The county was formed in 1835 and named for DeWitt Clinton, the seventh Governor of New York. It is a prohibition or dry county.

== History ==
Clinton County was formed on February 20, 1835, from portions of Cumberland and Wayne counties. It was named for DeWitt Clinton, governor of New York and driving force behind the Erie Canal.

Courthouse fires in 1864 (Confederate guerrillas) and 1980 resulted in the destruction of county records, but in the latter case, local volunteers' assistance successfully preserved almost all records.

== Geography ==
According to the U.S. Census Bureau, the county has a total area of 205 square miles (530 km^{2}), of which 197 square miles (510 km^{2}) is land and 8.2 square miles (21 km^{2}) (4.0%) is water.

=== Adjacent counties ===
- Russell County (north)
- Wayne County (east/EST border)
- Pickett County, Tennessee (south)
- Clay County, Tennessee (southwest)
- Cumberland County (west)

== Demographics ==
Historical population
| Census | Pop. | Note | %± |
|---|---|---|---|
| 1840 | 3,863 | | — |
| 1850 | 4,889 | | 26.6% |
| 1860 | 5,781 | | 18.2% |
| 1870 | 6,497 | | 12.4% |
| 1880 | 7,212 | | 11.0% |
| 1890 | 7,047 | | −2.3% |
| 1900 | 7,871 | | 11.7% |
| 1910 | 8,153 | | 3.6% |
| 1920 | 8,589 | | 5.3% |
| 1930 | 9,004 | | 4.8% |
| 1940 | 10,279 | | 14.2% |
| 1950 | 10,650 | | 3.6% |
| 1960 | 8,886 | | −16.6% |
| 1970 | 8,174 | | −8.0% |
| 1980 | 9,321 | | 14.0% |
| 1990 | 9,135 | | −2.0% |
| 2000 | 9,634 | | 5.5% |
| 2010 | 10,272 | | 6.6% |
| 2020 | 9,253 | | −9.9% |
| 2025 (est.) | 9,139 | ▼ | −1.2% |
U.S. Decennial Census; 1790-1960 1900-1990; 1990-2000 2010-2021

=== 2020 census ===
As of the 2020 census, the county had a population of 9,253. The median age was 43.2 years. 23.3% of residents were under the age of 18 and 20.2% of residents were 65 years of age or older. For every 100 females there were 96.1 males, and for every 100 females age 18 and over there were 94.3 males age 18 and over.

The racial makeup of the county was 94.5% White, 0.4% Black or African American, 0.2% American Indian and Alaska Native, 0.1% Asian, 0.0% Native Hawaiian and Pacific Islander, 1.5% from some other race, and 3.2% from two or more races. Hispanic or Latino residents of any race comprised 2.6% of the population.

0.0% of residents lived in urban areas, while 100.0% lived in rural areas.

There were 3,942 households in the county, of which 28.6% had children under the age of 18 living with them and 28.7% had a female householder with no spouse or partner present. About 32.4% of all households were made up of individuals and 16.1% had someone living alone who was 65 years of age or older.

There were 4,841 housing units, of which 18.6% were vacant. Among occupied housing units, 70.3% were owner-occupied and 29.7% were renter-occupied. The homeowner vacancy rate was 1.0% and the rental vacancy rate was 6.8%.

=== 2000 census ===
As of the census of 2000, there were 9,634 people, 4,086 households, and 2,811 families residing in the county. The population density was 49 per square mile (19/km^{2}). There were 4,888 housing units at an average density of 25 per square mile (9.7/km^{2}). The racial makeup of the county was 99.09% White, 0.10% Black or African American, 0.25% Native American, 0.04% Asian, 0.11% Pacific Islander, 0.08% from other races, and 0.32% from two or more races. 1.22% of the population were Hispanic or Latino of any race.

There were 4,086 households, out of which 29.80% had children under the age of 18 living with them, 55.50% were married couples living together, 9.70% had a female householder with no husband present, and 31.20% were non-families. 28.40% of all households were made up of individuals, and 12.80% had someone living alone who was 65 years of age or older. The average household size was 2.34 and the average family size was 2.85.

In the county, the population was spread out, with 22.70% under the age of 18, 8.60% from 18 to 24, 27.70% from 25 to 44, 26.00% from 45 to 64, and 15.00% who were 65 years of age or older. The median age was 39 years. For every 100 females there were 92.90 males. For every 100 females age 18 and over, there were 91.50 males.

The median income for a household in the county was $19,563, and the median income for a family was $25,919. Males had a median income of $21,193 versus $16,194 for females. The per capita income for the county was $13,286. About 20.20% of families and 25.80% of the population were below the poverty line, including 31.80% of those under age 18 and 29.90% of those age 65 or over.

== Communities ==
=== City ===
- Albany (county seat)

=== Unincorporated communities ===
- Aaron
- Abstons Corner
- Alpha
- Browns Crossroads
- Bug
- Cannons Mill
- Cartwright
- Cedar Knob
- Churntop
- Cumberland City
- Decide
- Dicken
- Fairland
- Five Springs
- Highway
- Hobart
- Hogback
- Huntersville
- Ida
- Jones Mill
- Lettered Oak
- Marlow
- Narvel
- Nora
- Pikeview
- Rolan
- Savage
- Seventy Six
- Shipley
- Snow
- Sparta
- Static‡
- Upchurch
- Wago
- Watauga
- Willis Creek
- Wolf River Dock

== Politics ==
United States presidential election results for Clinton County, Kentucky
| Year | Republican | | Democratic | | Third party(ies) | |
| Year | No. | % | No. | % | No. | % |
|---|---|---|---|---|---|---|
| 1912 | 828 | 65.25% | 310 | 24.43% | 131 | 10.32% |
| 1916 | 1,260 | 76.23% | 379 | 22.93% | 14 | 0.85% |
| 1920 | 2,356 | 84.20% | 431 | 15.40% | 11 | 0.39% |
| 1924 | 2,069 | 78.70% | 543 | 20.65% | 17 | 0.65% |
| 1928 | 2,580 | 88.81% | 325 | 11.19% | 0 | 0.00% |
| 1932 | 2,422 | 72.73% | 908 | 27.27% | 0 | 0.00% |
| 1936 | 2,147 | 75.39% | 701 | 24.61% | 0 | 0.00% |
| 1940 | 2,573 | 77.31% | 755 | 22.69% | 0 | 0.00% |
| 1944 | 2,618 | 82.20% | 564 | 17.71% | 3 | 0.09% |
| 1948 | 2,295 | 74.22% | 709 | 22.93% | 88 | 2.85% |
| 1952 | 2,856 | 80.54% | 678 | 19.12% | 12 | 0.34% |
| 1956 | 3,396 | 81.89% | 747 | 18.01% | 4 | 0.10% |
| 1960 | 3,524 | 84.11% | 666 | 15.89% | 0 | 0.00% |
| 1964 | 2,351 | 69.78% | 994 | 29.50% | 24 | 0.71% |
| 1968 | 2,572 | 75.09% | 568 | 16.58% | 285 | 8.32% |
| 1972 | 2,632 | 79.59% | 659 | 19.93% | 16 | 0.48% |
| 1976 | 2,354 | 69.46% | 987 | 29.12% | 48 | 1.42% |
| 1980 | 3,539 | 77.10% | 1,000 | 21.79% | 51 | 1.11% |
| 1984 | 3,459 | 80.03% | 838 | 19.39% | 25 | 0.58% |
| 1988 | 3,248 | 77.80% | 899 | 21.53% | 28 | 0.67% |
| 1992 | 2,830 | 63.80% | 1,241 | 27.98% | 365 | 8.23% |
| 1996 | 2,521 | 63.41% | 1,072 | 26.96% | 383 | 9.63% |
| 2000 | 3,224 | 74.89% | 1,032 | 23.97% | 49 | 1.14% |
| 2004 | 3,369 | 77.41% | 952 | 21.88% | 31 | 0.71% |
| 2008 | 3,366 | 80.68% | 761 | 18.24% | 45 | 1.08% |
| 2012 | 3,569 | 81.24% | 752 | 17.12% | 72 | 1.64% |
| 2016 | 3,809 | 85.37% | 547 | 12.26% | 106 | 2.38% |
| 2020 | 4,280 | 86.78% | 603 | 12.23% | 49 | 0.99% |
| 2024 | 4,276 | 87.43% | 549 | 11.22% | 66 | 1.35% |

Clinton County, like other counties in South Central and Southeastern Kentucky, has voted overwhelmingly Republican in presidential elections ever since Reconstruction ended. Counties in the Appalachian Mountains were less conducive to large-scale plantation farming that utilized slave labor and thus were more resistant to secession from the Union. Clinton County, being located on the western foothills of the Cumberland Plateau, reflected this with its voting patterns, having voted Republican even through the several party realignments since Reconstruction. Relative to population, Clinton County was a leader in providing soldiers for the Union Army during the U.S. Civil War, seeing 12.54% of its white population volunteer for Union service, exceeded only by the now-similarly Republican Owsley, Estill and Clay counties.

The last Democrat to carry Clinton County was Horatio Seymour in 1868 – when party realignment was just beginning – and the last Democrat to pass so much as 30 percent of the county's vote was Grover Cleveland in 1888. Nor has any Republican in this time span – even William Howard Taft during the divided 1912 election – fallen short of 60 percent. Jackson County is the only other county in the United States that has seen no Democrat reach 30 percent since the beginning of the 1890s, and apart from these two only Hooker County, Nebraska has seen no Democrat reach 30 percent since 1940.

=== Elected officials ===
Elected officials as of January 3, 2025
| U.S. House | James Comer (R) | KY 1 |
| Ky. Senate | Rick Girdler (R) | 15 |
| Ky. House | Josh Branscum (R) | 83 |

== See also ==
- DeWitt Clinton
- Preston Leslie
- Champ Ferguson
- Garlin Murl Conner
- Dry counties
- National Register of Historic Places listings in Clinton County, Kentucky
