= Pine Bluff High School =

Location
- 711 West 11th Street; Pine Bluff, Arkansas 71601; United States; 34°13′9″N 92°0′34″W

Information
- School type: Public
- Motto: Committed to Excellence
- Founded: 1868 (158 years ago)
- School board: Pine Bluff School District
- NCES District ID: 05000026
- Superintendent: Dr. Jennifer Barbaree
- CEEB code: 042030
- NCES School ID: 0500002600867
- Principal: Ronald Laurent
- Teaching staff: 73.93 (on FTE basis)
- Grades: 9–12
- Enrollment: 780 (2023–2024)
- Student to teacher ratio: 10.55
- Colors: Cardinal and white
- Mascot: Zebra
- Nickname: Zebras, The Z's, Z's
- Team name: Pine Bluff High Zebras
- Communities served: (beginning in fall 2023) Portions of Pine Bluff, Altheimer, Sherrill, Wabbaseka; Unincorporated areas: Lake Dick, New Gascony, Pastoria, Plum Bayou, Sweden, Tucker, and Wright
- Affiliation: Arkansas Activities Association
- Website: www.pinebluffschools.org/o/pinebluffhighschool

Pine Bluff High School (PBHS) is a comprehensive public high school in Pine Bluff, Arkansas, United States. It, a part of the Pine Bluff School District, is the largest of two public high schools in the Pine Bluff city limits and three public high schools in Jefferson County. Established in 1868, the school's interscholastic sports programs are one of the nation's most successful with a football national championship and one of the state's highest number of state championships in football, baseball and track and field.

== History ==
Established in 1868, Pine Bluff High School is one of the state's oldest schools and pre-dates the opening of Branch Normal College, which would later become University of Arkansas at Pine Bluff. In 1924, Pine Bluff High School became a charter member and accredited by the North Central Association, now named AdvancED. In 1925, the school's football team, coached by Foy Hammons, was crowned National Champions when it defeated Baton Rouge High School in the High School Football National Championship game by the score 26 to 0. The 1925 squad gained 8,588 total yards and held this national single-season record for 73 years and has remained as the state record.

Initially the Dollarway School District (DSD) sent older white students to Pine Bluff High and other area high schools, as it did not have its own high school for white students nor one for black students. In 1955 the Pine Bluff school district stopped accepting Dollarway students as Pine Bluff High had too many students.

In 2017 the State of Arkansas removed Pine Bluff High from a list of schools in academic distress.

The attendance boundary map of Pine Bluff High remained the same for the 2021–2022 school year, when the Pine Bluff district will absorb the DSD and begin operating Dollarway High School. In 2023, the high school had 583 students. That year, the district announced that Dollarway High would merge into Pine Bluff High.

The Arkansas Department of Education had made an agreement with the school district to redevelop Pine Bluff High, which would mean razing existing buildings and establishing new ones.

In 2024 the district moved students to the former Robey Middle School while the new high school was built.

== Campus ==
The school's campus consists of multiple buildings located primarily between West 8th and 11th streets (north and south) and Olive and Poplar streets (East and West). Major facilities include the McGeorge Building that houses the main administrative offices and the Little Theater, the Trice Building and Trice Gym, the Patterson Building that contains classrooms, the Arts Building, the Student Union, tennis courts, athletic fieldhouse and ROTC building, the Hill-Alford Softball Field, and Jordan Stadium that is used for football games and track meets.

== Attendance boundary ==
Effective fall 2023, the high school's attendance boundary will mirror the district's service area. This service area includes sections of Pine Bluff, as well as Altheimer, Sherrill, and Wabbaseka.

It also includes various unincorporated areas including Hardin, Lake Dick, Linwood, Moscow, New Gascony, Noble Lake, Pastoria, Plum Bayou, Sweden, Tucker, and Wright.

== Curriculum ==
The assumed course of study follows the Smart Core curriculum developed by the Arkansas Department of Education (ADE), which requires students complete 22 units prior to graduation. Students complete regular courses and exams and may select Advanced Placement (AP) coursework and exams that may lead to receiving college credit. In addition to being accredited by the ADE, Pine Bluff High School is a charter member and is accredited by AdvancED (formerly North Central Association).

In 2012, Pine Bluff High School was listed and unranked in the Best High Schools report from U.S. News & World Report.

== Athletics ==
The Pine Bluff High School mascot is the Zebra with cardinal and white serving as the school colors.

For 2012–14, the Pine Bluff Zebras compete in the 7A Classification—the state's largest classification—within the 7A/6A South Conference. The Zebras participate in numerous interscholastic sports and events administered by the Arkansas Activities Association including: football, basketball (boys/girls), cheer, cross country (boys/girls), soccer (boys), baseball, softball, swimming (boys/girls), tennis (boys/girls), and track and field (boys/girls).

=== Football ===
The Zebras football team have one of the most successful programs in the nation, which includes 711 all-time wins (as of 2014) and 24 state championships between 1915 and 2015 including three consecutive titles in 1993, 1994 and 1995. Both the 1993 and 1995 squads finished 14-0 seasons and were ranked No. 19 and No. 22 in the nation by USA Today, respectively. In 2010, synthetic turf was installed at Jordan Stadium, and the field was named the Torii Hunter Field.

The 1925 squad (16–0) won the High School Football National Championship and still maintains single season state records with 16 wins, 8,588 total yards gained and a national-record 8,081 rushing yards gained. In 1930, future Pro Football Hall of Famer Don Hutson caught 5 touchdown passes in a game, which still stands as an Arkansas' state record (tied twice since then).

The Zebras have produced several PARADE All-American High School Football Team selections to include:
- 1963 – Gordon Norwood, Back
- 1968 – Bill Kennedy, Lineman
- 1984 – Eric Mitchel, Quarterback

=== Basketball ===
The Zebras boys basketball squad has raised 13 state (classification) championships between 1923 and 2015 along with two (overall) championship banners (1977, 1990), the latter of which is no longer contested. Pine Bluff teams won three consecutive titles in 1933, 1934 and 1935. The most recent coming in 2015, when the 6th seeded Zebras, led by Coach Clarence Finley upset three #1 seeds en route to the Arkansas State Championship.

=== Baseball ===
The Pine Bluff Zebras baseball team is one of the nation's and state's most successful programs with a state-record 10 state baseball championship titles (tied-10th national all-time titles) from 1959 through 1995, including four consecutive titles - "Dynasty Years" (1983–86). As of 2012, the Zebras have been to 15 state title games, 19 state semi-finals, 37 state tournament appearances and 61 state tournament wins. Coach Billy Bock was named National Coach of the Decade for the 1980s by USA Today.

=== Track & field ===
The Zebras track and field teams have been competitive throughout most of the school's history with the boys squad winning 14 state championships between 1971 and 2000, going undefeated and earning a top-3 national ranking in 1981 coached by Andrew Butler during a period known as the "decade of dominance." The 1981 team also produced 7 High School All-Americans. The girls squad has won six state championships between 1981 and 2002. Butler was inducted into the Arkansas Track and Field Hall of Fame in 1999.

== Notable alumni ==
- John Barfield - Former MLB player (Texas Rangers)
- Mark Bradley - Professional football player (Chicago Bears, Kansas City Chiefs, and Tampa Bay Buccaneers).
- Danny Bradley - former professional football player and Dallas Cowboys executive.
- Billy Bock (Educator/coach, 1982–96)—Inductee, American Baseball Coaches Hall of Fame, National High School Coach of the Century.
- Andrew Butler - (Educator/coach, 1973–1993)-Inductee-1999, Arkansas Track and Field Hall of Fame and the Arkansas High School Coaches Association Hall of Fame.
- Bill Carr - Olympic Gold Medalist.
- Monte Coleman - former professional football player (Washington Redskins), Head Football Coach (University of Arkansas-Pine Bluff).
- Rhonda Coullet - Singer-actress.
- Jay Dickey (1957) - Politician; U.S. Congressman.
- Jeff Gross (1984) - Former Major League Baseball Scout (Texas Rangers/Chicago Cubs) Co-Owner: PB Locomotives Professional Baseball Club
- John Gross (1978) - Former Major League Baseball Scout (Texas Rangers/Chicago Cubs) Co-Owner: PB Locomotives Professional Baseball Club
- Jackie Harris - Professional football player (Green Bay Packers, Tampa Bay Buccaneers, Tennessee Titans and Dallas Cowboys).
- Torii Hunter - Former MLB Player (Minnesota Twins, Los Angeles Angels, Detroit Tigers)
- Don Hutson (1930) - Professional football player (Green Bay Packers); charter member of the Pro Football Hall of Fame.
- Mike Jeffcoat - Former MLB player (Cleveland Indians, San Francisco Giants, Texas Rangers, Florida Marlins); collegiate baseball coach.
- David Johnson - Professional football player (Pittsburgh Steelers).
- Bill LaFitte - Professional football player (Brooklyn Tigers)
- Martha Mitchell (1937) - wife of John N. Mitchell, United States Attorney General under President Richard Nixon.
- Smokie Norful (1991) - Gospel singer.
- Pat Pappas (1955) - politician
- Annie Reinhart (1961) - Missouri state representative from 1997 to 2004.
- Willie Roaf (1988) - Professional football player; inductee, Pro Football Hall of Fame (2012).
- Pamela A. Smith - police officer
- Dennis Swilley - Professional football player (Minnesota Vikings).
