= Pastoria, Arkansas =

Coordinates: 34°21′29″N 92°02′25″W

Pastoria, also known as Pastoria Township, in an unincorporated community in Jefferson County, Arkansas. It lost population to Sherrill, Arkansas after a rail line bypassed it in the 19th century.

R. Sherrill, listed as a member of the Arkansas House of Representatives in 1882 was listed as residing in Pastoria.

The Antioch Missionary Baptist Church Cemetery in the area is listed on the National Register of Historic Places. The church was established by an African American community.

== Education ==
Pastoria is in the Pine Bluff School District. The schools serving Pastoria are Park/Greenville School for preschool, James Matthews Elementary School, Robert F. Morehead Middle School, and Dollarway High School.

Pastoria was previously in the Sherrill School District. The Altheimer-Sherrill district was created in 1979 when the Altheimer and Sherrill districts merged. In 1993, that merged into in the Altheimer Unified School District (operator of Altheimer-Sherrill High School). That in turn merged into the Dollarway School District on July 10, 2006. Altheimer-Sherrill High closed in 2007, with students moved to Dollarway High. Altheimer Martin Elementary School closed in 2013.

In December 2020 the Arkansas State Board of Education ruled that the Dollarway School District should merge into the Pine Bluff School District as of July 1, 2021; the post-merger school district began operating all existing schools from both districts. Accordingly, the attendance boundary maps of the respective schools remained the same for the 2021–2022 school year, and all DSD territory became a part of the PBSD territory. The exception was with the pre-kindergarten levels, as all PBSD areas are now assigned to Forrest Park/Greenville School, including the territory from the former Dollarway district. In 2023 the district announced that Dollarway High would merge into Pine Bluff High School, and that Morehead Middle School would become the only middle school for all of the Pine Bluff School District.

== See also ==
- List of Arkansas townships
