= Hardin, Arkansas =

Unincorporated community in Arkansas, United States

- Unincorporated community
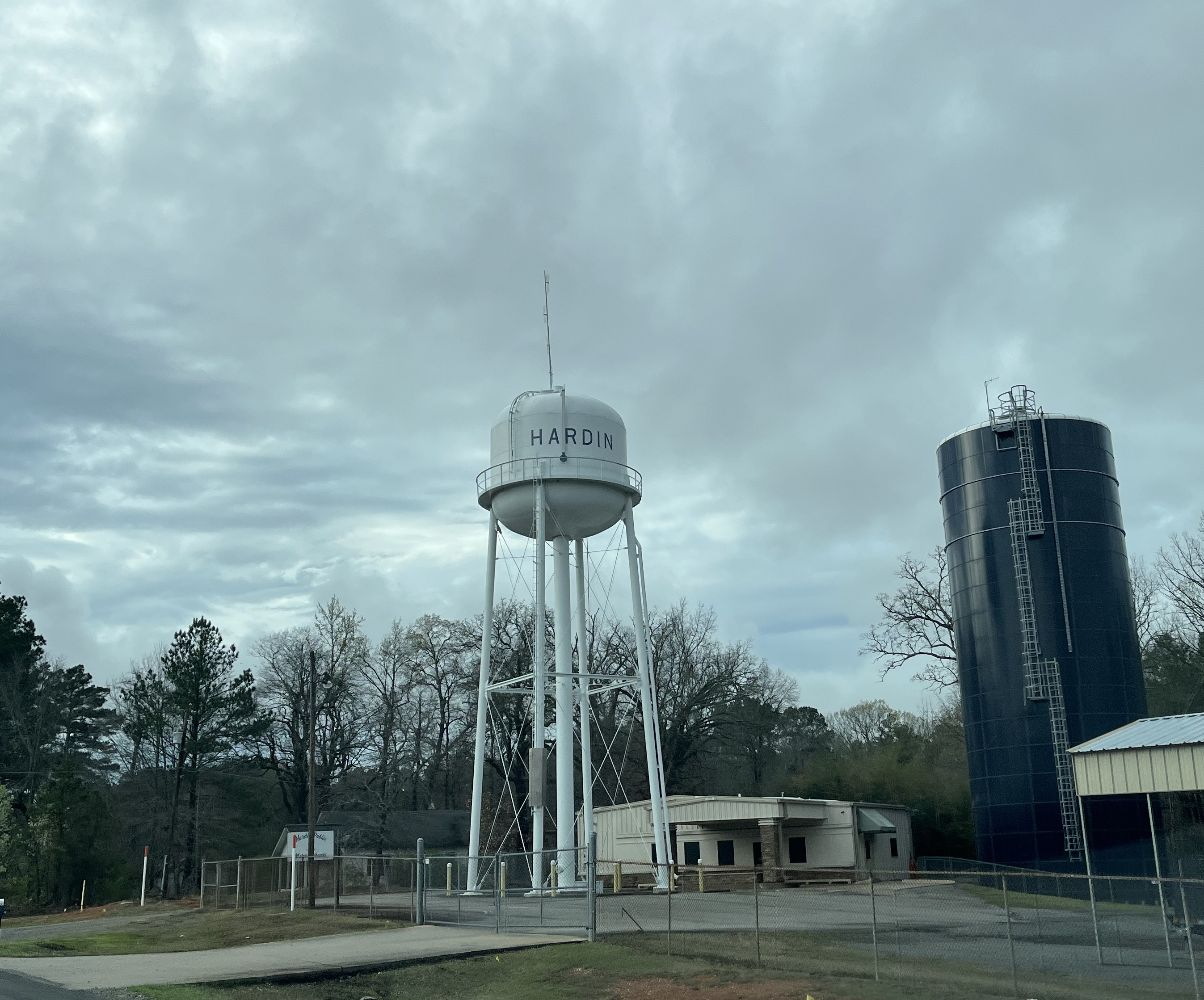
- Hardin Water Tower

- Location within Arkansas
- Coordinates: 34°16′52″N 92°09′01″W
- Country: United States
- State: Arkansas
- County: Jefferson
- Township: Washington
- Elevation: 351 ft (107 m)
- Time zone: UTC– 06:00 (CST)
  - Summer (DST): UTC– 05:00 (CDT)
- ZIP code: 71602
- Area code: 870
- GNIS feature ID: 57880
- Highways: U.S. Highway 270
- Major airport: Clinton National (LIT)

Hardin is an unincorporated community in Jefferson County, Arkansas, United States. It is located on U.S. Highway 270, 4.6 miles (7.4 km) west-northwest of White Hall.

== Education ==
Residents are in the Pine Bluff School District. It is in a non-continuous part of the district, separated from the rest by the White Hall School District. Students are zoned to Park/Greenville School for preschool, James Matthews Elementary School, Robert F. Morehead Middle School, and Dollarway High School.

Hardin previously had its own school district: it had elementary and junior high school levels, grades 1–9, in a two building facility, with one building newer than the other. The district paid for high school students to attend other schools. The district also had a residence for teachers. The school was reserved for white children. A fire destroyed the more recent building in either 1947 or 1948. A legal document stated "At that time the District was probably under some pressure to merge into a larger district" and that the fact that the Dollarway School District sent high school students to Pine Bluff High School of the Pine Bluff School District is possibly why the Hardin district chose to merge into the Dollarway district instead of an adjacent district. The building destroyed by fire was not rebuilt. Dollarway annexed the Hardin school district in 1948.

Hardin Elementary remained as its own school. By the mid-20th century in the Dollarway district, black students in the district attended area black schools for black children and continued to Pine Bluff School District's Merrill High School while white students had a choice between Pine Bluff High School in the Pine Bluff district, Watson Chapel High School in the Watson Chapel School District, and White Hall High School in the White Hall district. Four schools for black children combined into Townsend Park Elementary in 1951. In 1952 a junior high building in the Dollarway complex for white children opened. In 1955 the district opened a high school for black children, Townsend Park High School, and in 1957 it opened Dollarway High School for white children, partly because in 1955 the Pine Bluff district stopped taking Dollarway students.

Hardin Elementary closed in 1964. A legal document stated "that building or its facilities came in need of substantial repairs or renovations which the District was unwilling or unable to make". Pinecrest Elementary School had opened in 1961 to take overflow students from the Hardin area.

In the late 1960s the Hardin area had 270 students at Dollarway schools, with five of them being black.

Some Hardin parents advocated for re-separating the Hardin school district; on September 11, 1969, they voted to leave the Dollarway district, with the county board of education making a move to change funding. The vote to separate was on a narrow margin. However the US District Court for the Eastern District of Arkansas blocked the split on the grounds that it was interfering with desegregation efforts as those were based upon the Hardin are staying in the district; the court stated that Hardin could split again once desegregation efforts ended. John B. Pickhardt, an alumnus of University of Arkansas, Fayetteville, wrote that opposition to being in Dollarway had built up over decades partly due to the 1964 closure of the Hardin school and partly because the Dollarway board of education chose not to appoint anybody from Hardin to vill a vacancy, even though the perception elsewhere in the district was that Hardin residents did not want racially integrated schools.

In 1969 Townsend Park High consolidated into Dollarway High, with junior high levels also combined into Dollarway Junior High. Elementary schools were consolidated in 1970, with grades 1–2 at Dollarway Elementary, grade 3 at Pinecrest, and grades 4–6 at Townsend Park elementary.

In December 2020 the Arkansas State Board of Education ruled that the Dollarway School District should merge into the Pine Bluff School District as of July 1, 2021; the post-merger school district is to operate all existing schools from both districts. Accordingly, the attendance boundary maps of the respective schools remained the same for the 2021–2022 school year, and all DSD territory became a part of the PBSD territory. The exception was with the pre-kindergarten levels, as all PBSD areas are now assigned to Forrest Park/Greenville School, including the territory from the former Dollarway district. In 2023 the district announced that Dollarway High would merge into Pine Bluff High School, and that Morehead Middle School would become the only middle school for all of the Pine Bluff School District.
