= Tucker, Arkansas =

- Census-designated place
- Location within Arkansas Location within the United States
- Coordinates: 34°26′22″N 91°57′07″W
- Country: United States
- State: Arkansas
- County: Jefferson
- Elevation: 223 ft (68 m)

Population (2020)
  - Total: 95
- Time zone: UTC-6 (Central (CST))
  - Summer (DST): UTC-5 (CDT)
- GNIS feature ID: 2805688

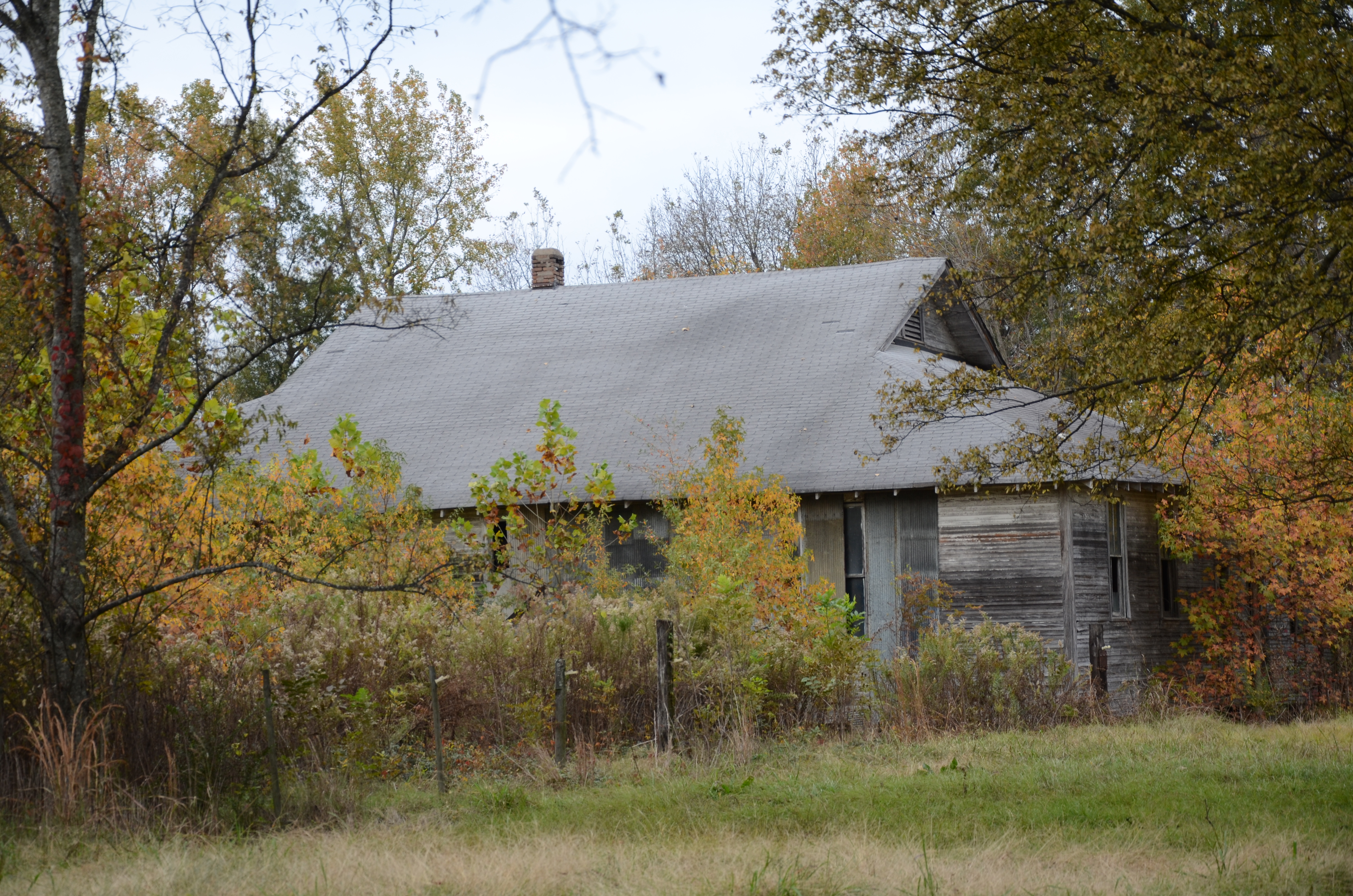
Tucker School

Tucker is an unincorporated community and census-designated place (CDP) in Jefferson County, Arkansas. It is located 30 miles (48 km) southeast of Little Rock. It was first listed as a CDP in the 2020 census with a population of 95.

== History ==
In 1871 John Woodfin Tucker established the Tucker Plantation, named after his wife, Sarah E. Tucker. The plantation, which mostly produced cotton, expanded to occupy 2,800 acres (1,100 ha). Paid farmworkers and resident sharecroppers worked the land. The Tucker family managed the post office and the store.

== Demographics ==
Circa 1958, Tucker had 74 residents.

Historical population
Census	Pop.	Note	%±
2020	95		—
U.S. Decennial Census; 2020

=== Racial and ethnic composition ===
Tucker CDP, Arkansas – Racial and ethnic composition Note: the U.S. census treats Hispanic/Latino as an ethnic category. This table excludes Latinos from the racial categories and assigns them to a separate category. Hispanics/Latinos may be of any race.
Race / Ethnicity (NH = Non-Hispanic)	Pop 2020	% 2020
White alone (NH)	3	3.16%
Black or African American alone (NH)	89	93.68%
Native American or Alaska Native alone (NH)	0	0.00%
Asian alone (NH)	0	0.00%
Native Hawaiian or Pacific Islander alone (NH)	0	0.00%
Other race alone (NH)	0	0.00%
Mixed race or Multiracial (NH)	0	0.00%
Hispanic or Latino (any race)	3	3.16%
Total	95	100.00%

== Government and infrastructure ==
=== Local government ===
The Tucker Volunteer Fire Department provides fire services. The fire station is along Arkansas Highway 15.

=== State representation ===
The Arkansas Department of Correction (ADC) operates the ADC Complex in Tucker; the complex is off Arkansas Highway 15, 9 miles (14 km) south of England and 25 miles (40 km) north of Pine Bluff. The two prison units in the complex are the Tucker Unit and the Maximum Security Unit. The ADC training academy, the Willis S. Sargent Training Academy, is in the complex, adjacent to the Maximum Security and Tucker units.

In 1916 the state purchased 4,400 acres (1,800 ha) of land to establish the Tucker Unit. In 1933 the death chamber moved from the Arkansas State Penitentiary to the Tucker Unit, because the penitentiary closed. The final execution at Tucker, before the death penalty in Arkansas was declared to be unconstitutional, took place in 1964. In 1974 male death row inmates, previously at the Tucker Unit, were moved to the Cummins Unit, which is not in Tucker. In 1978 a new death chamber opened in Cummins, so Tucker Unit was no longer the point of execution. In 1986, male death row inmates were moved to the Maximum Security Unit in Tucker. In 2000, the ADC training academy moved to its current location from the former Barnes School building. On Friday August 22, 2003, all 39 Arkansas death row inmates were moved from the Maximum Security Unit to the Supermax at the Varner Unit, which is not in Tucker.

=== Federal representation ===
The United States Postal Service operates the Tucker Post Office. When members of the Tucker family operated the post office, the family used the post office as a makeshift banking facility via money order sales; the scheme was used to support customers who were not able to afford establishing conventional bank accounts.

== Education ==
Tucker is served by the Pine Bluff School District. Students are zoned to Park/Greenville School for preschool, James Matthews Elementary School, Robert F. Morehead Middle School, and Pine Bluff High School.

Up until the 1980s its school district was the Plum Bayou-Tucker School District, which was to be annexed by the Wabbaseka School District due to financial difficulties; the Plum Bayou-Tucker district was to be dissolved with Wabbaseka absorbing the new territory. On July 1, 1983, the consolidation into the Wabbaseka-Tucker School District occurred. For a period the district operated Tucker Elementary School. Later it served all students from its Wabbaseka school property.

On September 1, 1993, Wabbaseka Tucker consolidated into the Altheimer Unified School District; Altheimer Unified ended all use of the Wabbaseka school property in 1996. Altheimer Unified, thereafter, operated two schools: Martin Elementary School and Altheimer-Sherrill High School, both in Altheimer. The Altheimer Unified School District consolidated into the Dollarway School District on July 10, 2006. Altheimer-Sherrill High closed in 2007, with students moved to Dollarway High School. Altheimer Martin Elementary School closed in 2013. From that point forward all students are bussed to Pine Bluff.

In December 2020 the Arkansas State Board of Education ruled that the Dollarway School District should merge into the Pine Bluff School District as of July 1, 2021; the post-merger school district began operating all existing schools from both districts. Accordingly the attendance boundary maps of the respective schools remained the same for the 2021-2022 school year, and all DSD territory became a part of the PBSD. The exception was with the pre-kindergarten levels, as all PBSD areas are now assigned to Forrest Park/Greenville School, including the territory from the former Dollarway district. In 2023 the district announced that Dollarway High would merge into Pine Bluff High School, and that Morehead Middle School would become the only middle school for all of the Pine Bluff School District.
