= New Gascony, Arkansas =

Unincorporated community in Arkansas, United States

- Unincorporated community
- Location within Arkansas
- Coordinates: 34°13′35″N 91°46′35″W
- Country: United States
- State: Arkansas
- County: Jefferson
- Township: Bogy
- Founded: November 29, 1832 (193 years ago)
- Founder: Antoine Barraqué
- Named for: Gascony, France
- Elevation: 194 ft (59 m)
- Time zone: UTC– 06:00 (CST)
  - Summer (DST): UTC– 05:00 (CDT)
- Area code (s): 870
- FIPS code: 05-49280
- GNIS feature ID: 77813

New Gascony, also known as Barraque Landing, is an unincorporated community in Jefferson County, Arkansas, United States. It is located 13 miles (21 km) west of Pine Bluff, the county seat.

Founded by French Émigré Antoine Barraqué, a 19th-century landowner, in 1832; it was named for the Gascony region of France.

== History ==
=== Brooks-Baxter War ===
New Gascony was the site of a skirmish during the Brooks-Baxter war on April 30th, 1874. Known as the battle of New Gascony, the fight involved a militia led by Hercules King Cannon White engaging with a militia led by Joseph L. Murphy. The thirty minute fight resulted in nine injuries among White's forces, and twenty to thirty wounded among Murphy's forces with an additional seven to nine deaths incurred. This was the most significant engagement in the war.

=== St. Peter's Cemetery ===
St. Peter's cemetery is a Catholic cemetery where many prominent residents of New Gascony were buried. The cemetery is listed on the National Registry of Historic Places.

== Education ==
It is a part of the Pine Bluff School District. The schools serving New Gascony are Park/Greenville School for preschool, James Matthews Elementary School, Robert F. Morehead Middle School, and Dollarway High School.

New Gascony was previously in the Altheimer School District. The Altheimer-Sherrill district was created in 1979 when the Altheimer and Sherrill districts merged. In 1993, that merged into the Altheimer Unified School District (operator of Altheimer-Sherrill High School). That district merged into the Dollarway School District on July 10, 2006. Altheimer-Sherrill High closed in 2007, with students moved to Dollarway High. Altheimer Martin Elementary School closed in 2013.

In December 2020 the Arkansas State Board of Education ruled that the Dollarway School District should merge into the Pine Bluff School District as of July 1, 2021; the post-merger school district began operating all existing schools from both districts. Accordingly, the attendance boundary maps of the respective schools remained the same for the 2021–2022 school year, and all DSD territory became a part of the PBSD territory. The exception was with the pre-kindergarten levels, as all PBSD areas are now assigned to Forrest Park/Greenville School, including the territory from the former Dollarway district. In 2023 the district announced that Dollarway High would merge into Pine Bluff High School, and that Morehead Middle School would become the only middle school for all of the Pine Bluff School District.

== See also ==
- List of place names of French origin in the United States
- National Register of Historic Places listings in Jefferson County, Arkansas
