= Antioch Missionary Baptist Church Cemetery =

Historic cemetery in Jefferson County, Arkansas, US

- U.S. National Register of Historic Places
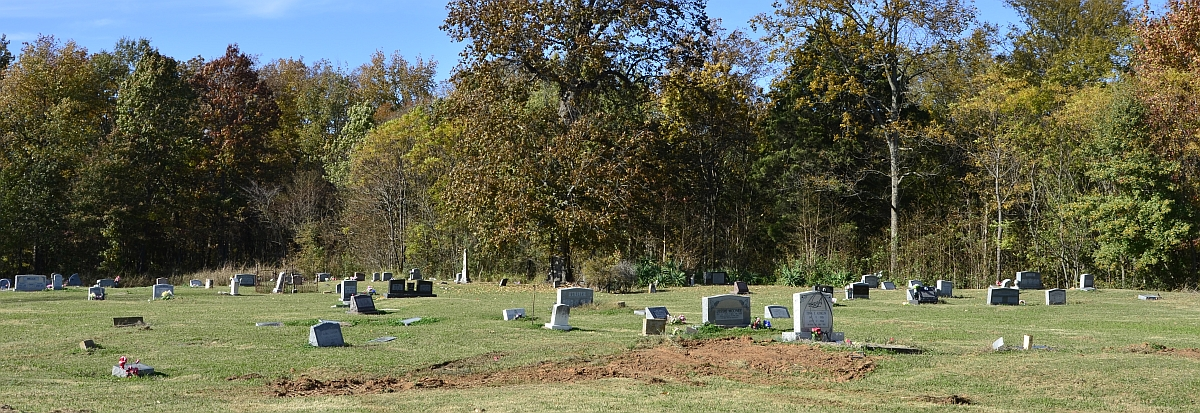
- Antioch Missionary Baptist Church Cemetery (Sherrill, Arkansas)

- Location within Arkansas Location within the United States
- Nearest city: Sherrill, Arkansas
- Coordinates: 34°23′37″N 91°58′59″W
- Area: 9 acres (3.6 ha)
- Built: 1885
- NRHP reference No.: 09001299
- Added to NRHP: December 24, 2009

The Antioch Missionary Baptist Church Cemetery is located at 500 North McKinney Road in Sherrill, Arkansas, behind the Antioch Missionary Baptist Church. The earliest graves contain the remains of emancipated slaves, originally enslaved on the Good Hope Plantation in South Carolina, but moved to Jefferson County, Arkansas in 1860. Reverenced Lewis Mazique, a leader in the community, was the earliest documented burial, in 1885. The cemetery continues to be used today, although infrequently.

The cemetery was listed on the National Register of Historic Places in 2009.

== See also ==
- National Register of Historic Places listings in Jefferson County, Arkansas
