= The Elms (Altheimer, Arkansas) =

Historic house in Arkansas, United States

- U.S. National Register of Historic Places
- Location within Arkansas Location within the United States
- Nearest city: Altheimer, Arkansas
- Coordinates: 34°18′15″N 91°50′33″W
- Area: 1 acre (0.40 ha)
- Built: 1866
- Built by: Jones, Dr.Samuel Jordan
- Architectural style: Louisiana raised cottage
- NRHP reference No.: 78000596
- Added to NRHP: July 7, 1978

Presently used as a waterfowl hunting lodge, The Elms is a historic plantation house in rural Jefferson County, Arkansas. Located a short way south of Altheimer, it is a 1 1/2-story raised Louisiana cottage, an architectural form that is extremely rare in Arkansas. It is a 1 1/2-story wood-frame structure, set on a raised basement. A porch extends across the front, with jigsawn balustrade, and the main roof is pierced by three gabled dormers. The house was built in 1866 by Dr. Samuel Jordon Jones. Today, the house serves as the centerpiece of The Elms Lodges & Leases, a commercial duck hunting business.

The building was listed on the National Register of Historic Places in 1978.

== See also ==
- National Register of Historic Places listings in Jefferson County, Arkansas
