= Roselawn (Altheimer, Arkansas) =

Historic house in Arkansas, United States

- U.S. National Register of Historic Places
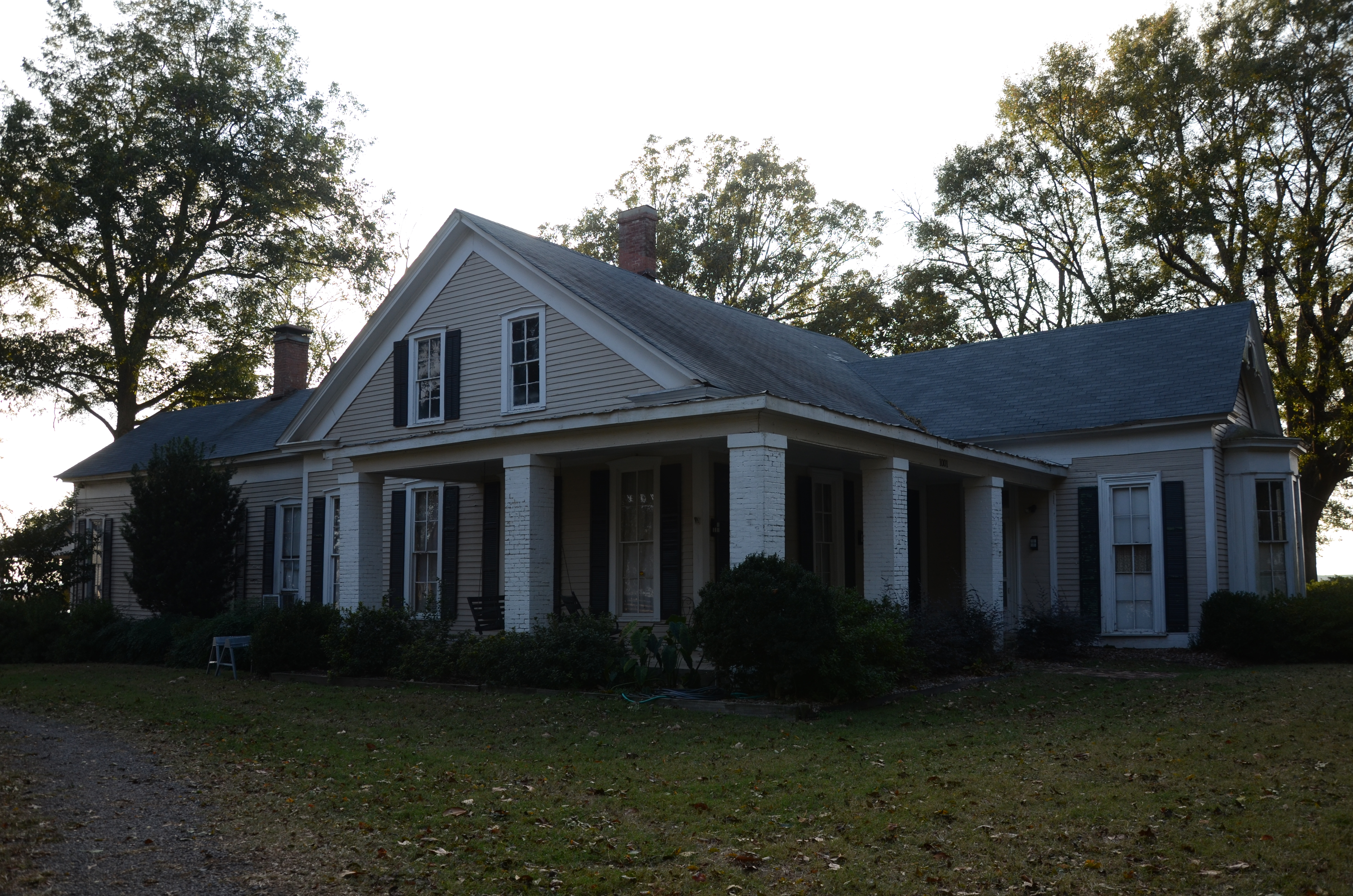

- Location within Arkansas Location within the United States
- Nearest city: Altheimer, Arkansas
- Coordinates: 34°18′26″N 91°51′34″W
- Area: 10 acres (4.0 ha)
- Built: 1875
- NRHP reference No.: 78000597
- Added to NRHP: May 23, 1978

Roselawn is a historic plantation house, located in rural Jefferson County, Arkansas, a short way south of Altheimer. The house, set among trees on the east side of Collier Lee Road, is a single-story rectangular wood-frame structure with projections to the front and rear. An ornately decorated bay projects from the east side topped by a gable with bargeboard decoration, and a porch extends along that facade to the south, supported by brick piers. The house is believed to have been built sometime between 1870 and 1888, and is one of the oldest surviving plantation houses in Jefferson County.

The house was listed on the National Register of Historic Places in 1978.

== See also ==
- National Register of Historic Places listings in Jefferson County, Arkansas
