= Dollarway High School =

Location
- 4900 Dollarway Road; Pine Bluff, Arkansas 71602; United States
- Coordinates: 34°14′26″N 92°3′21″W

Information
- School type: Public
- School district: Pine Bluff School District (2021-2023); Dollarway School District (1957-2021)
- NCES District ID: 0505410 (under Dollarway)
- CEEB code: 042040
- NCES School ID: 050541000253 (under Dollarway); 050002600253 (under Pine Bluff)
- Grades: 9–12
- Enrollment: 329 (2016-17)
- Student to teacher ratio: 10.78
- Colors: Cardinal and white
- Mascot: Cardinal
- Team name: Dollarway Cardinals
- Accreditations: ADE; AdvancED (1962–)
- Communities served: Portions of Pine Bluff, Altheimer, Sherrill, Wabbaseka; Unincorporated areas: Lake Dick, New Gascony, Pastoria, Plum Bayou, Sweden, Tucker, and Wright
- Affiliation: Arkansas Activities Association
- Website: www.pinebluffschools.org/dollarwayhighschool

Dollarway High School was a comprehensive public high school in northwest Pine Bluff, Arkansas that served grades 9 through 12. It was one of three public high schools in Pine Bluff and was a part of the Pine Bluff School District effective July 1, 2021. Prior to that point it was the only high school managed by the Dollarway School District. Within the state, the school is often referred to as Pine Bluff Dollarway. It closed as of fall 2023.

== History ==
Initially DSD sent older white students to Pine Bluff High School of the Pine Bluff School District, Watson Chapel High School of the Watson Chapel School District, and White Hall High School of the White Hall School District, as it did not have its own high school for white students nor one for black students. In 1955 the Pine Bluff district stopped accepting Dollarway students because there were too many students at Pine Bluff High. In 1957 DSD opened its own high school for white children, Dollarway High, next to Dollarway Elemenetary and Dollarway Junior High. That year Dollarway High had about 388 students. In 1957-1958 the district spent $158 per capita per Dollarway High student, making those students the costliest per capita in the district.

Judge Axel J. Beck of the Eastern District of Arkansas ordered the district to allow three black children to attend Dollarway High effective fall 1959, starting anti-integration efforts in the district. However Dollarway schools remained segregated in 1959 due to a stay in the courts. The first black student at Dollarway High began attending in January 1963. In the 1960s, when racial integration occurred, conflict between Dollarway High students occurred, but anti-racial integration groups did not instigate any conflicts.

Dove v Parham, 1959 lawsuit mandated integration at Dollarway, but segregationists including Jim Johnson and Amis Guthridge incited a riot to prevent black children from attending the schools. In 1963, two black children in a wagon were beaten by white parents. In 1964, a black man Rob Bryant, was elected to the Dollarway School District. Although there was an attempt on the part of whites to invalidate the election, Bryant joined the board. In 1969, due to the federally mandated integration of public schools, Dollarway merged with all-black Townsend Park High School.

Circa 2002 the school had grades 10-12 and there were about 322 students. The Altheimer Unified School District consolidated into the Dollarway School District on July 10, 2006. In 2006 enrollment was 647.

Additional classrooms and a new cafeteria were funded by a tax millage passed in 2007.

The Altheimer district formerly operated Altheimer-Sherrill High School. In 2007 Altheimer-Sherrill High closed, and the students were rezoned to Dollarway High, causing its enrollment to increase. At that time the new Dollarway High principal was the ex-principal of the other school.

By 2012 the district had a 10-year master plan calling to spend $2,800,000 to add new classrooms and to refurbish existing ones.

In 2016 Dollarway High moved into the building formerly occupied by Robert F. Morehead Middle School. The district continued to use the former Dollarway High campus. Dollarway superintendent Barbara Warren made the moves in an effort to begin using three campuses total instead of four.

In December 2020 the Arkansas State Board of Education ruled that the Dollarway School District should merge into the Pine Bluff School District as of July 1, 2021, with all schools of the two school districts, including Dollarway High, remaining open post-merger. Accordingly, the attendance boundary map of Dollarway High will remain the same for the 2021–2022 school year. The Arkansas Board of Education mandated PBSD to keep Dollarway High on operation as a condition of the merger. In 2022 the student count was decreasing, and a group called PBSD Stakeholders for Consolidation was advocating for consolidating the former Dollarway campuses into other PBSD facilities. I.C. Murrell of the Northwest Arkansas Democrat Gazette stated "a high school merger is not off the table."

By March 2023, the high school had 163 students. That month the district announced that Dollarway High would merge into Pine Bluff High School. According to Jennifer Barbaree, the superintendent, the district may use the former Dollarway High building to take some classes of Robert F. Morehead Middle School, which would be the only middle school in the Pine Bluff school district. According to I. C. Murrell of the Arkansas Democrat Gazette, this decision was "expected" by the community.

== Attendance zone ==
As the sole high school of the Dollarway district, Dollarway High's boundary included sections of Pine Bluff as well as Altheimer, Sherrill, and Wabbaseka. It also served the unincorporated areas of Hardin, Lake Dick, New Gascony, Pastoria, Plum Bayou, Sweden, Tucker, and Wright.

== Academics and academic performance ==
The assumed course of study is the Smart Core curriculum developed by the Arkansas Department of Education. Students may engage in regular and Advanced Placement (AP) coursework and exams prior to graduation. Dollarway has been accredited by AdvancED (formerly North Central Association) since 1962.

== Campus ==
The present facility received a renovation in 2010.

A 2012 Arkansas legislative document stated that the ages and conditions of the buildings of the former campus varied and that in light of district proposals to build new facilities, "the oldest buildings seem to have been allowed to fall into disrepair, perhaps the product of not wanting to spend money to maintain a facility that ultimately should be replaced". The document stated that superintendent Arthur Tucker "was anxious for [Arkansas state employees] to see the old buildings’ poor condition." Citing a board meeting in 2011 where a member of an advocacy organization asked for a millage increase, the document stated "The poor condition of the high school buildings appears to be an issue district‐wide."

The Dollarway district headquarters were, in 2012, on the same campus as Dollarway High. The 2012 Arkansas legislative document stated that as a result the workers in the two facilities were in "close proximity".

== Demographics ==
Circa 2012 90% of the students qualified for either lunches at school sold for a reduced price or lunches at no cost, a proxy for poverty, and 94% of the students were African-American. A grant application for the school described "[a]n overwhelming portion of our students" as having issues with gangs, transient housing, poverty, violence, and poor house.

== Student discipline ==
It had a student attendance rate of 90.1%, below the state average. Student discipline was the lowest ranked indicator of the 2009 scholastic audit and that it indicated a severe lack of student discipline in general. The 2011 report stated that students being late and fights were aspects of the school.

== Extracurricular activities ==
The Dollarway High School mascot is the Cardinal bird with school colors of cardinal and white.

The 2011 state report stated "The teachers who talked with us are disappointed the school does not have student organizations".

=== Athletics ===
For 2012–14, the Dollarway Cardinals participate in the 4A Region 2 Conference for interscholastic activities administered by the Arkansas Activities Association (AAA) including baseball, basketball (boys/girls), cheer, dance, cross country, football, golf (boys/girls), softball, and track and field.

- Football: The football team won 3 consecutive state football championship in 1988, 1989, 1990, with a combined record of 40–2.
- Golf: The boys golf team won a state golf championship in 1960.
- Basketball: The Cardinals boys basketball team won a state championship in 2006 and was also a 2013 state championship finalist; losing to the Pottsville Apaches 54–50.
- Track and field: The boys track team won a state track and field championship in 1990.

== Notable alumni ==
The following are notable people associated with Dollarway High School. If the person was a Dollarway High School student, the number in parentheses indicates the year of graduation; if the person was a faculty or staff member, that person's title and years of association are included.

- Carl Kidd – American football player in the NFL and CFL.
- Greg Lee – American football player in the NFL.
