= Sebron Williams Dawson =

Arkansas state legislator in 1889 and 1891

Sebron Williams Dawson was a state legislator in Arkansas. He served in the Arkansas House of Representatives in 1889 and 1891. He represented Jefferson County, Arkansas and was a Republican.
