= Sweden, Arkansas =

- Unincorporated community
- Location within Arkansas Location within the United States
- Coordinates: 34°11′35″N 91°43′27″W
- Country: United States
- State: Arkansas
- County: Jefferson
- Elevation: 190 ft (58 m)
- Time zone: UTC-6 (Central (CST))
  - Summer (DST): UTC-5 (CDT)
- Area code: 870
- GNIS feature ID: 57201

Sweden is an unincorporated community in Jefferson County, Arkansas, United States. Sweden is located on Arkansas Highway 88, 16.1 miles (25.9 km) east of Pine Bluff. On January 22, 2012, an EF2 tornado struck Sweden, damaging grain bins and metal buildings; the tornado continued to a point northeast of Lodge Corner in Arkansas County.

== Education ==
It is a part of the Pine Bluff School District The schools serving Sweden are Park/Greenville School for preschool, James Matthews Elementary School, Robert F. Morehead Middle School, and Dollarway High School.

Sweden was previously in the Altheimer School District. The Altheimer-Sherrill district was created in 1979 when the Altheimer and Sherrill districts merged. In 1993, that merged into the Altheimer Unified School District (operator of Altheimer-Sherrill High School), which merged into the Dollarway School District on July 10, 2006. Altheimer-Sherrill High closed in 2007, with students moved to Dollarway High. Altheimer Martin Elementary School closed in 2013.

In December 2020 the Arkansas State Board of Education ruled that the Dollarway School District should merge into the Pine Bluff School District as of July 1, 2021; the post-merger school district began operating all existing schools from both districts. Accordingly, the attendance boundary maps of the respective schools remained the same for the 2021–2022 school year, and all DSD territory became a part of the PBSD. The exception was with the pre-kindergarten levels, as all PBSD areas are now assigned to Forrest Park/Greenville School, including the territory from the former Dollarway district. In 2023 the district announced that Dollarway High would merge into Pine Bluff High School, and that Morehead Middle School would become the only middle school for all of the Pine Bluff School District.
