= Wright, Arkansas =

- Unincorporated community
- Location within Arkansas Location within the United States
- Coordinates: 34°26′06″N 92°03′59″W
- Country: United States
- State: Arkansas
- County: Jefferson
- Elevation: 220 ft (67 m)
- Time zone: UTC-6 (Central (CST))
  - Summer (DST): UTC-5 (CDT)
- ZIP code: 72182
- Area code: 501
- GNIS feature ID: 56551

Wright is an unincorporated community in Jefferson County, Arkansas, United States. Wright is located on Arkansas Highway 256, 7.5 miles (12.1 km) west-northwest of Sherrill. Wright has a post office with ZIP code 72182.

== Education ==
It is a part of the Pine Bluff School District. The schools serving Wright are Forrest Park/Greenville School for preschool, James Matthews Elementary School, Robert F. Morehead Middle School, and Dollarway High School.

It was formerly in the Plum Bayou-Tucker School District. On July 1, 1983, the consolidation into the Wabbaseka Tucker School District occurred. On September 1, 1993, the Wabbaseka-Tucker district consolidated with the Altheimer-Sherrill School District, forming the Altheimer Unified School District (operator of Altheimer-Sherrill High School). That in turn merged into the Dollarway School District on July 10, 2006. Altheimer-Sherrill High closed in 2007, with students moved to Dollarway High. Altheimer Martin Elementary School closed in 2013.

In December 2020 the Arkansas State Board of Education ruled that the Dollarway School District should merge into the Pine Bluff School District as of July 1, 2021; the post-merger school district began to operate all existing schools from both districts. Accordingly, the attendance boundary maps of the respective schools remained the same for the 2021–2022 school year, and all DSD territory became a part of the PBSD. The exception was with the pre-kindergarten levels, as all PBSD areas are now assigned to Forrest Park/Greenville School, including the territory from the former Dollarway district. In 2023 the district announced that Dollarway High would merge into Pine Bluff High School, and that Morehead Middle School would become the only middle school for all of the Pine Bluff School District.
