= Blackstone Waterhouse =

Arkansas state legislator

Blackstone Waterhouse was a state legislator in Arkansas. In 1883, he represented Jefferson County, Arkansas in the Arkansas House of Representatives.

He was selected as an alternate delegate to the 1912 Arkansas Republican Convention. His post office was listed as being in Pine Bluff.
