= Richland Township, Jefferson County, Arkansas =

Township in Jefferson County, Arkansas

Coordinates: 34°11′N 91°49′W

Richland Township, officially the Township of Richland, is a township in Jefferson County, in the U.S. state of Arkansas. Its population was 279 as of the 2020 census.

== History ==
French American Revolutionary War veteran Auguste Serville, having been wounded at Yorktown in attacking and carrying one of the enemy's redoubts on the evening of October 14, 1781, was found dead in the woods near the house of Antoine Barraqué, in Richland Township, on December 30, 1828. Killed by a falling tree; Serville was buried with military honors, The funeral was attended by political and military notables. The site of the grave is unknown.
