= Carl R. Polk =

Arkansas Judge and politician

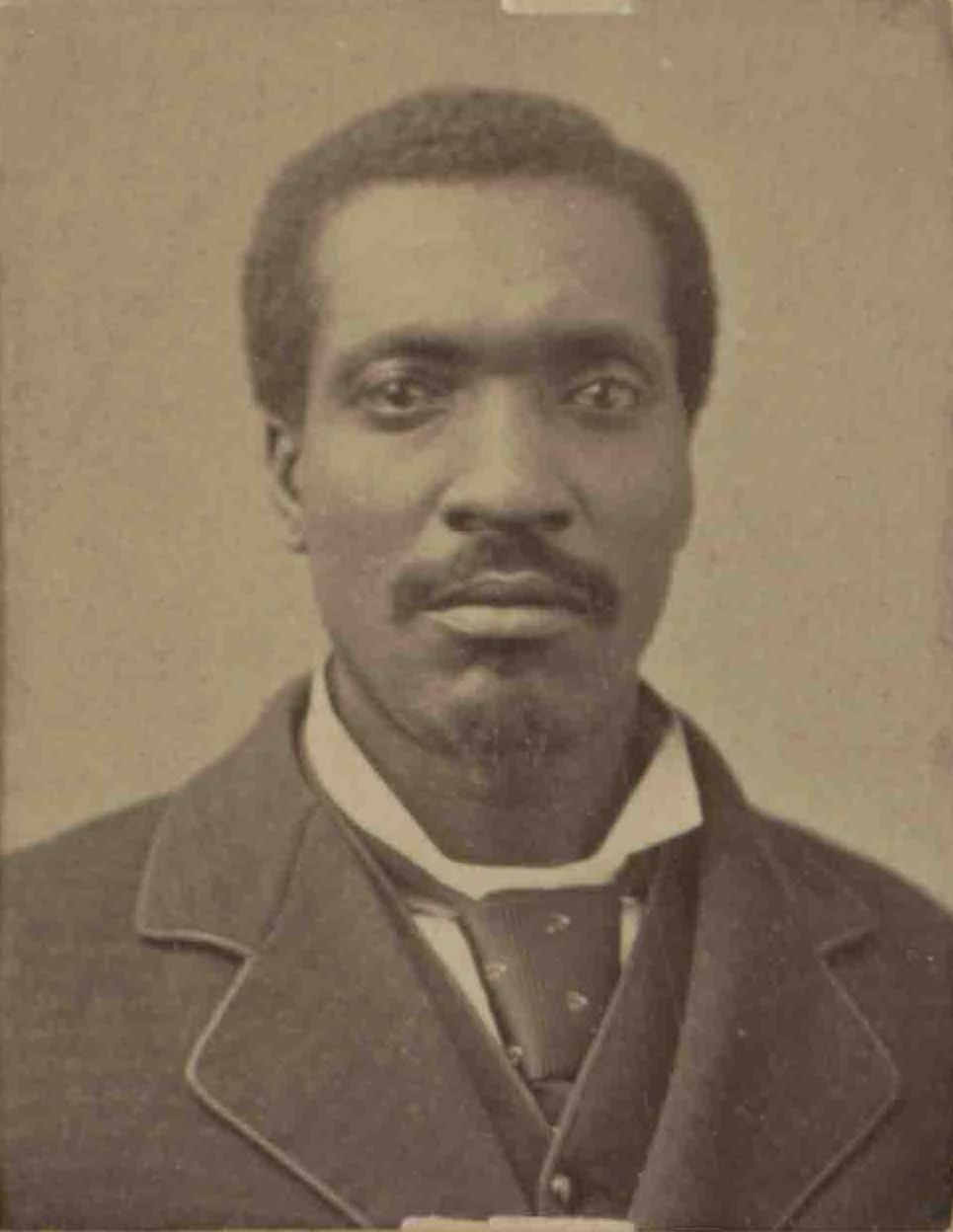
Carl R. Polk

Carl R. Polk (c. 1841–1926) was a farmer, state legislator, and judge in Arkansas. He was born a slave in Arkansas. He represented Jefferson County, Arkansas, in the Arkansas House of Representatives in 1871 and 1881.

He was appointed a justice of the peace in 1871. His photograph was included in a composite of Arkansas House members in 1881.

== See also ==
- African American officeholders from the end of the Civil War until before 1900
