= Rusty Sherrill =

American politician

Rusty Sherrill (1832/1835 – ?), also written as Ranty Sherrill or R. Sherrill, was an American politician and state legislator in Arkansas. He served in the Arkansas House of Representatives for Jefferson County, Arkansas in 1883. He served with two other African Americans in the Arkansas House.

He was listed as residing in Pastoria, Arkansas.

== See also ==
- African American officeholders from the end of the Civil War until before 1900
