= Pat Pappas =

American businessman and politician (1936–2026)

Member of the Arkansas House of Representatives
- In office 1995–2000

Personal details
- Born: Pat Gus Pappas; December 14, 1936 Pine Bluff, Arkansas, U.S.
- Died: June 3, 2026 (aged 89)
- Party: Democratic
- Spouse: Alice Pantages (m. 1964)
- Education: Henderson State University
- Occupation: Businessman

Pat Gus Pappas (December 14, 1936 – June 3, 2026) was an American businessman and politician. A member of the Democratic Party, he served in the Arkansas House of Representatives from 1995 to 2000.

== Early life and career ==
Pappas was born in Pine Bluff, Arkansas, the son of Gus and Antigoni Pappas. His parents were Greek immigrants. He attended Pine Bluff High School, graduating in 1955. After graduating, he served eight years in the army reserves, which after his discharge, he attended Henderson State University, earning his degree in mathematics and physics. He worked as an engineer at Lockheed Missiles and Space Company in 1962. In his hometown, he established Farmers Insurance, an insurance agency.

He served in the Arkansas House of Representatives from 1995 to 2000. After his service in the House, he retired from his insurance agency in 2003.

== Personal life and death ==
In 1964, Pappas married Alice Pantages. Their marriage lasted until Pappas's death in 2026.

Pappas died on June 3, 2026, at the age of 89.
