= Vaugine Township =

Township in Jefferson County, Arkansas

Coordinates: 34°13′N 92°1′W

Vaugine Township, officially the Township of Vaugine, is a township in Jefferson County, in the U.S. state of Arkansas. It is named for Major Francis Vaugine, a 19th-century landowner. Its population was 41,374 as of the 2020 census. The only municipality is Pine Bluff, the county seat.

== See also ==
- List of place names of French origin in the United States
- List of places in the United States named after people
