= Jefferson Township, Jefferson County, Arkansas =

Township in Jefferson County, Arkansas

Coordinates: 34°23′N 92°10′W

Jefferson Township, officially the Township of Jefferson, is a township in Jefferson County, in the U.S. state of Arkansas. Its population was 2,416 as of the 2020 census.
