= Annie Reinhart =

Missouri politician

Member of the Missouri House of Representatives from the 34th district
- In office 1996–2004

Personal details
- Born: October 29, 1942 Mobile, Alabama, U.S.
- Died: August 24, 2004 (aged 61) Kansas City, Missouri, U.S.
- Party: Republican

Annie Sweeney Reinhart (October 29, 1942 – August 24, 2004) was an American Republican politician from Liberty, Missouri, who served in the Missouri House of Representatives.

Born in Mobile, Alabama, she graduated from the Pine Bluff High School in Pine Bluff, Arkansas, and attended The Brown School of Business. She worked as a pharmacy technician, a book and music buyer, an office manager, and as an executive secretary.

== Electoral history ==
Missouri House of Representatives General Election, November 2002, District 34
Party	Candidate	Votes	%	±%
Republican	Annie Reinhart	5,959	54%	
Democratic	Robert J. Saunders	5109	46%	
