= Barraque Township =

Township in Jefferson County, Arkansas, United States

- Township
- Location in Arkansas
- Coordinates: 34°25′N 92°9′W
- Country: United States
- State: Arkansas
- County: Jefferson
- Established: 1858 (168 years ago)
- Named after: Antoine Barraqué

Area
  - Land: 30.7 sq mi (80 km^{2})
- Elevation: 253 ft (77 m)

Population (2020)
  - Total: 2,515
  - Density: 81.9/sq mi (31.6/km^{2})
- Time zone: UTC–6 (CST)
  - Summer (DST): UTC–5 (CDT)
- ZIP Codes: 72079, 72132
- Area code: 501
- GNIS feature ID: 66731
- Highways: Interstate 530; U.S. Highway 65; Highway 46; Highway 365
- Major airport: Clinton National Airport (LIT)

Barraque Township is a township in northwestern Jefferson County, Arkansas, United States. It is named after Antoine Barraqué, a 19th-century landowner, on what was formerly part of the Quapaw Nation. Established in 1858, it is located on the left bank of the Arkansas River. The townships population was 2,515 as of the 2020 census. The only municipality is Redfield.

== See also ==
- List of Arkansas townships
- List of place names of French origin in the United States
- List of places in the United States named after people
