= Noble Lake, Arkansas =

- Unincorporated community
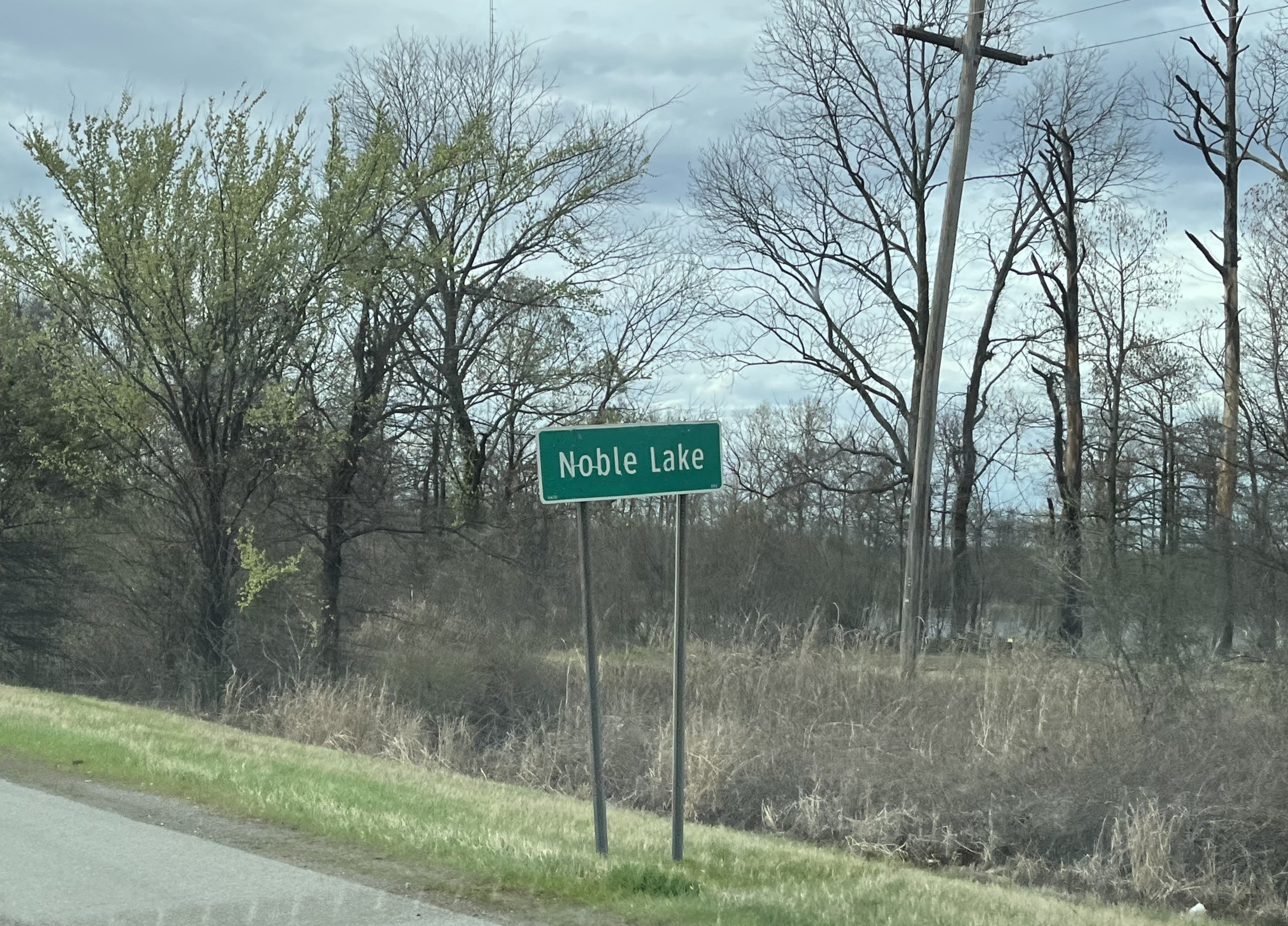

- Location within Arkansas Location within the United States
- Coordinates: 34°10′23″N 91°51′15″W
- Country: United States
- State: Arkansas
- County: Jefferson
- Elevation: 203 ft (62 m)
- Time zone: UTC-6 (Central (CST))
  - Summer (DST): UTC-5 (CDT)
- Area code: 501
- GNIS feature ID: 77853

Noble Lake (also Nobles, Nobles Lake) is an unincorporated community in Jefferson County, Arkansas, United States.

== History ==
Noble Lake is named for the Noble family, who settled in the area.

Harvey C. Couch formerly operated an experimental farm in Noble Lake.

== Education ==
Noble Lake is in the Pine Bluff School District. It operates Pine Bluff High School.

Noble Lake was formerly in the Linwood School District. On July 1, 1984, the Linwood School District consolidated into the Pine Bluff school district.

As of 2021 for pre-kindergarten all PBSD areas are now assigned to Forrest Park/Greenville School.
