= Bill LaFitte =

American football player (1920–1987)

No. 31
- Position: End

Personal information
- Born: November 23, 1920; Stonewall, Louisiana, U.S.
- Died: March 4, 1987 (aged 66)
- Listed height: 6 ft 1 in (1.85 m)
- Listed weight: 171 lb (78 kg)

Career information
- High school: Pine Bluff (AR)
- College: Ouachita Baptist

Career history
- Brooklyn Tigers (1944)

Career statistics
- Games played: 3–4
- Receptions: 1
- Receiving yards: 15
- Stats at Pro Football Reference

William Sorrells LaFitte (November 23, 1920 – March 4, 1987) was an American football end who played one season in the National Football League (NFL) for the Brooklyn Tigers. He played college football at Ouachita Baptist.

LaFitte was born on November 23, 1920, in Stonewall, Louisiana. He attended Pine Bluff High School in Arkansas, before playing college football at Ouachita Baptist. He played the 1939 to 1940 seasons there, before being drafted to serve in World War II. He was a member of the United States Navy. After returning to the U.S. in 1944, he played professionally for the Brooklyn Tigers of the National Football League (NFL). LaFitte appeared in at least three games, recording one reception for fifteen yards. He did not return to the Tigers in 1945. LaFitte died on March 3, 1987, at the age of 66.
