= Altheimer Unified School District =

Former school district in Arkansas

Location
- Altheimer, Jefferson County, Arkansas; United States

District information
- Established: 1979
- Closed: 2006 (merged into Dollarway School District)

Altheimer Unified School District No. 22, previously the Altheimer-Sherrill School District, was a school district headquartered in Altheimer, Arkansas. It served Altheimer, Sherrill, Wabbaseka, and other portions of Jefferson County, including the unincorporated areas of Lake Dick, New Gascony, Pastoria, Plum Bayou, Sweden, Tucker, and Wright. The district in the 1993–2006 period had 333 square miles (860 km^{2}) of territory.

In its final years the district operated two schools: Martin Elementary School and Altheimer-Sherrill High School. In the pre-desegregation era white students attended Altheimer High School and black students attended Altheimer Training School. In 2006 it merged into the Dollarway School District, which in turn merged into the Pine Bluff School District in 2021.

== History ==
In the 1960s the Altheimer district began a "school of choice" program where parents could choose which schools their children could attend, in light of educational desegregation of races.

The Altheimer-Sherrill district was created in 1979 when the Altheimer and Sherrill districts merged.

Fred Martin, Jr., formerly the principal of the high school, became the superintendent of the Altheimer-Sherrill School District in 1982. Martin left the district in 1988 and became the mayor of Altheimer.

Altheimer-Sherrill School District annexed the former Wabbaseka-Tucker School District on August 16, 1993. As the Altheimer Unified School District it began operations on September 1, 1993, making Wabbaseka, Tucker, and Plum Bayou a part of the district. Both the Altheimer-Sherrill and Wabbaseka-Tucker districts had debts from overpayment and so the merged district took those debts.

The district received a 12-acre (4.9 ha) school property in Wabbaseka when it annexed the Wabbaseka district; the district ended all use of the property in 1996. Altheimer Unified sold it to the City of Wabbaseka for $674,623 in the 2001 fiscal year. By June 2001 it was not yet used for a new purpose.

The Altheimer Library of the Pine Bluff-Jefferson County Library System was built on land sold by Altheimer Unified to the county government for $3,784.

For a two-year period until 2006 the district ran at a deficit due to enrollment declines. Its final enrollment was about 400. The State of Arkansas required for the Altheimer district to merge with another district, but Altheimer could choose another district that agreed to merge with it. The only district that agreed to do so was the Dollarway School District. The Altheimer Unified School District consolidated into the Dollarway district on July 10, 2006. A majority of board members of each district ultimately agreed to the consolidation.

Effective July 1, 2021, the Dollarway territory became part of the Pine Bluff School District.

Jefferson County, Arkansas school district mergers

Pine Bluff	Linwood	Dollarway	Hardin	Altheimer-Sherrill	Wabbaseka	Plum Bayou-Tucker
	Pine Bluff		Dollarway		Wabbaseka-Tucker
					Altheimer Unified
			Dollarway
		Pine Bluff

== Academic performance ==
Before the closing of the district, the district was in academic distress according to State of Arkansas measurements.
