= Dollarway School District =

Former school district in Arkansas

Coordinates: 34.290°N 92.165°W

- 4900 Dollarway Road Pine Bluff, Arkansas, 71602

District information
- Type: Public
- Grades: PreK–12
- Closed: 2021
- NCES District ID: 0505410

Students and staff
- Students: 936
- Teachers: 79.67
- Staff: 115.0
- Student–teacher ratio: 11.75

Other information
- Website: www.dollarwayschools.org

Dollarway School District No. 2 (DSD) was a school district headquartered in Pine Bluff, Arkansas, United States. With over 1,600 students and employing more than 300 educators and staff, the district had three active school campuses at the end of its life.

It served sections of Pine Bluff as well as the municipalities of Altheimer, Sherrill, and Wabbaseka. It was one of four school districts to serve sections of Pine Bluff. It also served the unincorporated areas of Hardin, Lake Dick, New Gascony, Pastoria, Plum Bayou, Sweden, Tucker, and Wright.

It merged into the Pine Bluff School District effective July 1, 2021.

== History ==
=== The Beginning ===
It was named after Dollarway Road, with a one-room school for white students opening in 1914. Initially the district only operated elementary and junior high school level education and was racially segregated; religious entities educated black students in the district's beginnings. By the mid-20th century black students were educated in area schools for black children and continued to Pine Bluff School District's Merrill High School, while white students attended the Dollarway School and then had a choice between Pine Bluff High School in the Pine Bluff district, Watson Chapel High School in the Watson Chapel School District, and White Hall High School in the White Hall School District. After World War II African-Americans moved into the district to work at the Pine Bluff Arsenal, prompting the district to build new schools to accommodate them.

Dollarway annexed the Hardin school district in 1948. The four black schools were combined into Townsend Park Elementary School, which opened in 1951.

=== The Civil Rights Movement ===
In 1954 the district board refused a request to have racially integrated classes made by several black parents and National Association for the Advancement of Colored People (NAACP) member William Dove.

In 1955 the district opened a high school for black children, Townsend Park High School, and in 1957 it opened Dollarway High School for white children, partly because in 1955 the Pine Bluff district stopped taking Dollarway students. The Dollarway district continued to oppose desegregation, with Dove being refused a second time in 1957, as the Brown II decision in the U.S. Supreme Court allowed Southern school districts to choose their paces of desegregation. John B. Pickhardt, an alumnus of the University of Arkansas, Fayetteville, stated that the district was already spending less per capita to educate black students than white ones and so "there was little economic incentive to integrate".

In June 1959 black parents sued the district after it kept refusing desegregation requests. Judge Axel J. Beck of the Eastern District of Arkansas ordered the district to allow three black children to attend Dollarway High effective fall 1959, starting anti-integration efforts in the district. However Dollarway schools remained segregated for 1959-1960 due to a stay in the courts. The district enacted testing for black students who wished to transfer. Dollarway Elementary began hosting black students on September 7, 1960, with no incidents of violence occurring. The first black student at Dollarway High began attending in January 1963.

Pickhardt stated that in the 1960s the Dollarway district board of directors allowed small numbers of black students to white classes, something area anti-racial integration groups did not oppose, and that such groups did not instigate violence. This meant that little negative press appeared in the newspapers and slowed the rate at which black students appeared in area schools. In 1964 there were two black students in majority white schools, making Dollarway district have the second lowest percentage of black students in mostly white schools of the 21 school districts in the state that already began the integration process. Of those 21 districts it was one of two that had a population of over 30% African-American. As a result of the Civil Rights Act of 1964, the district created a new desegregation plan involving "freedom of choice" where parents choose which school their children will attend. Due to still relatively low numbers of black students attending white schools, Pickhardt wrote that the freedom of choice plan effectively kept races separate. Late 1960s court cases however forced districts to change their freedom of choice plans to outright combine schools, and Henley ordered changes to the school system effective 1969.

Some Hardin parents advocated for re-separating the Hardin school district; on September 11, 1969, they voted to leave the Dollarway district, with the county board of education making a move to change funding. The vote to separate was on a narrow margin. However the US District Court for the Eastern District of Arkansas blocked the split on the grounds that it was interfering with desegregation efforts as those were based upon the Hardin staying in the district; the court stated that Hardin could split again once desegregation efforts ended. Pickhardt wrote that opposition to being in Dollarway had built up over decades partly due to the 1964 closure of the Hardin school and partly because the Dollarway board of education chose not to appoint anybody from Hardin to fill a vacancy, even though the perception elsewhere in the district was that Hardin residents did not want racially integrated schools.

Schools were combined for grades 7-12 effective 1969. Judge J. Smith Henley, seeing that the district did not put enough white students in Townsend Park elementary schools, ordered elementary schools combined effective 1970. White flight occurred over several decades.

=== 1970s to 2020 ===
In 1979 the Jefferson County School District dissolved, with a portion of the students going to the Dollarway school district.

In 2006 the Dollarway district was in financial distress.

The Altheimer Unified School District consolidated into the Dollarway School District on July 10, 2006. The State of Arkansas had demanded that the Altheimer district merge with another district as the Altheimer district's financial situation had deteriorated. The board of the Dollarway district, the only one to agree to a merger with Altheimer, formally asked the state to give the Altheimer territory to Dollarway the previous May, and the Altheimer board also agreed to the consolidation. This consolidation meant that small towns and rural areas in northern Jefferson County, including Altheimer, Sherrill, Wabbaseka, Tucker, and Plum Bayou, became a part of the district. For a period the consolidated district had two taxation rates, one for the original Dollarway district and one for the former Altheimer Unified. In addition the district operated two bus mechanic stops, with the Pine Bluff one serving the majority of the population of the district and the Altheimer one moving children from the Altheimer area to the schools in Pine Bluff. There were two interim board members to represent the Altheimer area. The Dollarway district, in 2007, was no longer in financial distress partly because the State of Arkansas gave the district $1,700,000 to help the district absorb the Altheimer district.

From about 2008 to 2018, the poor economy of Pine Bluff prompted parents to leave the area, and accordingly, Dollarway district officials have an estimate of an enrollment decline of about 900 for the period. A 2011 State of Arkansas legislative research document stated that additionally the Dollarway district lost enrollment while the Watson Chapel and White Hall school districts' enrollment remained constant, and it concluded that Dollarway students were leaving to go to those districts and private schools and charter schools. Superintendent Arthur Tucker stated, as paraphrased by the document, "he believes some of these losses result from the poor reputation the Dollarway School District has in the area and the rundown school facilities." The legislative document stated, in regards to whether to first prioritize academic improvement or repairing the buildings, "there is little consensus about which part of the problem to address first." By 2015 a millage increase had been voted down so the majority of the board was reluctant to put another on the ballot.

The Arkansas Department of Education took control of the school district in 2012 due to failing to meet state education guidelines. In 2014 state control ended and the school board resumed operations. State control resumed in 2015 due to low test scores. The State of Arkansas designated the school district as being in "academic distress" from 2011 until 2016, and after an audit found issues in financial reporting, in April 2016 the Arkansas Board of Education also ruled that the district was in "fiscal distress".

The district held a centennial celebration in 2014 after band director Brandon Shorter read an article in the Arkansas Historical Quarterly that gave the year of establishment in 1914 and he verified that information, prompting him and his colleagues to organize a committee for the centennial.

As of 2015 the Dollarway School Board exempted the district from a state law that normally allows parents in one school district to have their children sent to attend schools in another school district. Parents from seven families, including the president of the Dollarway Parent Teacher Organization, Annie Bryant, argued against the exemption; Bryant stated that due to the large number of students on free or reduced lunch, it was clear that the students had no other choice but to go to public schools, and therefore the district ought to allow transfers. As of that year there were no persons requesting that their children be transferred from another school district to the Dollarway district.

=== Takeover and closure ===
In 2015 the Arkansas State Board of Education took control of the district. Barbara Warren became superintendent as per the school board naming her to the position. The Pine Bluff Commercial praised the state takeover and criticized the previously elected school boards. In 2020 the district had 921 students.

In December 2020 the Arkansas State Board of Education ruled that the Dollarway School District should merge into the Pine Bluff School District as of July 1, 2021; all seven Arkansas state education board members approved this. According to the consolidation plan, all schools of the two districts will continue to operate post-merger. Ryan Watley, the CEO of the organization Go Forward Pine Bluff, argued that Dollarway no longer was viable as an individual school district. Joni Alexander, a member of the Pine Bluff City Council, argued that the post-merger school district boundaries in effect privilege students in the White Hall School District; he pointed to the City of White Hall having fewer people than the City of Pine Bluff.

The Pine Bluff Commercial stated that there was a lack of comment in the Arkansas state board of Education meetings and that there was a "lack of any significant outcry from patrons or anyone else for that matter."

Jefferson County, Arkansas school district mergers

Pine Bluff	Linwood	Dollarway	Hardin	Altheimer-Sherrill	Wabbaseka	Plum Bayou-Tucker
	Pine Bluff		Dollarway		Wabbaseka-Tucker
					Altheimer Unified
			Dollarway
		Pine Bluff

== Geography ==
The pre-Altheimer merger boundaries included two non-contiguous portions, each between the White Hall School District. The part to the west included unincorporated areas such as Hardin, and the part to the east mostly included unincorporated areas between the Arkansas River and Pine Bluff, with a northern part of Pine Bluff included. The western section also includes a portion of White Hall. The area that was the sum of the district between 1948 and 2006 has a total of 48 square miles (120 km^{2}) of area.

The merged area from the Altheimer district, with an additional 333 square miles (860 km^{2}) of area, includes the municipalities of Altheimer, Sherrill, and Wabbaseka. It also includes the unincorporated areas of Lake Dick, New Gascony, Pastoria, Plum Bayou, Sweden, Tucker, and Wright.

== Demographics ==
In the mid-1950s about 50% of the students were black and about 50% were white, with the former concentrated east of Dollarway Road, and the latter west of Dollarway Road, with the western Hardin part of the district predominately white. In the 1957–1958 school year it had about 2,060 students. The black Townsend Park campuses together had about 1,043 while the white Dollarway campuses together had about 1,017 students.

In fall 1968 the Dollarway campuses had 1,328 students, with 64 being black. Of the 48 teachers, four were black. All 1,679 Townsend Park students were black, and of the 59 teachers, three were white. Circa 1969 there were about 270 Hardin students at Dollarway schools, 5 of them being black.

In 1970 the district was about 55% black and each school, now fully integrated, had roughly the same proportion. The district at the time had a total of 114 teachers, half black and half white, with each school having roughly that proportion of teachers by race. Due to white flight the number of white students declined. 92% of the students were black as of 2007.

In 2006 the district had 2,037 students in grades K-12, and 92 preschool students.

In 2015, according to Bryant, about 98% of the district's students were on free or reduced lunches. In 2015-2016 it had almost 1,200 students.

Circa 2016 it had 1,171 students. In May 2020 that figure was down to 941, and by December that year it was down to 921. Its projected 2021 enrollment was 904. 901 was the enrollment in the final school year. The Arkansas Democrat Gazette stated that according to analysts, the district's cash reserves eroded because it was not pulling in as much funds as the student enrollment had declined and that bankruptcy was a possibility within several years in the future.

== Operations ==
In the mid-1950s the district was spending less to educate black students than to educate white students, with $120 per capita on the former and $157 per capita on the latter.

The district headquarters was, in 2012, on the same campus as Dollarway High. The 2012 Arkansas legislative document stated that as a result the workers in the two facilities were in "close proximity".

== Academic performance ==
Dollarway School District is located in Pine Bluff, Arkansas and operates five schools, serving students from pre-kindergarten to grade 12. According to GreatSchools, a larger number of schools in this district are rated below average in school quality. However, students at many of the schools in this district are making about the same academic progress as the state average.

Dollarway High School is the only high school in the Dollarway School District and is ranked 221-267th within Arkansas 2. The AP® participation rate at Dollarway High School is 26% and the total minority enrollment is 97% 2. The graduation rate at Dollarway High School is 75%, which is well below the state median 2.

In a December 11 article, state education Secretary Johnny Key said that Dollarway “has made great strides” under Warren, noting progress in its academic program and financial management 3. “The district has made significant progress both fiscally and academically,” Key said at the time of the board vote 3.

== Schools ==
Open at time of dissolution:

- Dollarway High School, serving grades 9 through 12.
- Robert F. Morehead Middle School, serving grades 5 through 8.
  - Formerly Dollarway Junior High School, it started as a school for white students, established with funding from a federal grant awarded in 1952. It previously had grades 7-9 and circa 2002 it had about 412 students. By 2006 it was known as Dollarway Middle School and had 458 students. In 2016 it moved into the former Townsend Park Elementary School, while Dollarway High moved into the previous Morehead building.
- James Matthews Elementary School, located in Pine Bluff and seservesrekindergarten through grade 4.
  - It was built in 1987 on the former Pines Drive-In Movie Theater, with the kindergarten wing opening the following year. Circa 2001 it had about 400 students, and around that time it was only for grades K-2. Circa 2002 this was down to 369. In 2006 it had 283 students in grade school and 80 in preschool.

Closed prior to dissolution

Secondary

- Altheimer-Sherrill High School and Altheimer Middle School, closed in 2007, located in Altheimer
- Townsend Park High School

Elementary

- Altheimer–Martin Elementary School, located in Altheimer and serving prekindergarten through grade 5.
  - Altheimer-Martin Elementary School, a Dollarway School District elementary school, occupied the former high school facility. The 30,000-square-foot (2,800 m^{2}) building was built in 1987. It included a gymnasium. In 2006 it had 156 students in grade school and 12 in preschool. Up to 2013 the school's enrollment declined, and in 2013 the Dollarway superintendent decided that the school should be closed in light of the declining attendance, with 78 students in the school's final year. Since 2013 some property had been taken from the school building, and a lack of maintenance occurred. Altheimer mayor Zola Hudson stated a desire for the city government to repurpose the building. By 2018 the district was proceeding to donate the building to the city.
- Dollarway Elementary School, located west of Dollarway Road, was a school for white children. It and the junior high school had 629 students in 1958. On September 7, 1960, it began hosting black students. In 1969 Dollarway Elementary was about 70-80% white. Effective 1970 it became the school for all students in grades 1-2 for the district.
- Hardin Elementary School, in the Hardin community, was a school for white children. The school closed in 1964. Hardin area residents did not like it when the school closed. A legal document stated, "that building or its facilities came in need of substantial repairs or renovations which the District was unwilling or unable to make".
- Pinecrest Elementary School, in Pine Bluff
  - It opened in 1961 for overflow students from the Hardin area. In 1968 the school had 323 students and 11 teachers, with one each being black. In 1969 Pinecrest Elementary was about 70-80% white. Effective 1970 it became the school for all students in grade 3 for the district. By circa 2001 it had 13 teachers and 206 students and was a grade 3-4 school for the entire district.
  - In 2012 the Arkansas Delta Resource Center sought to begin using the former Pinecrest building. By 2018 the campus was not in use. The district considered demolishing the building after selling the land.
- Townsend Park Elementary School, located in Pine Bluff, was a school for black children. It was 1 mile (1.6 km) east of Dollarway road. It was built next to Merrill Park, named after Merrill High School principal William J. Townsend, after the district received a federal grant to do so in 1951. It had 712 students in 1958. In 1969 it had 15 white students, even though Judge Henley wanted the school to be at least 23% white. Effective 1970 it became the school for all students in grades 4-6 for the district. By 2002 it had about 262 students and was for grades 5–6. By 2006 it had north and south campuses, with each having 245 and 248 students, respectively.
