= Altheimer-Sherrill High School =

Information
- Former names: Altheimer Training School; (until 1961); Martin High School; (1961-1969); Altheimer High School; (1969-c.1979)
- Closed: 2007
- Enrollment: 239 (2007)

Altheimer-Sherrill High School was a junior and senior high school (grades 7-12) in Altheimer, Arkansas, United States, operated by the Altheimer-Sherrill School District, and later the Altheimer Unified School District. At the time of its closing it served Altheimer, Sherrill, Wabbaseka, and other portions of Jefferson County, including the unincorporated areas of Tucker, Plum Bayou, Pastoria, and Wright.

Circa 2005 the school had about 142 students.

== History ==
It was previously the Altheimer Training School. It served as the high school for African-Americans, while Altheimer High School served as the high school for white students.

In 1955 Fred Martin Jr., who began his term as a mathematics teacher at the school in 1949, was named the school's principal. In 1961 its name changed to Martin High School in honor of the principal, who sought to improve the curriculum and building. In the period 1955-1982 the school received accreditation from the North Central Association of Colleges and Schools, and a red-brick classroom building and gymnasium were built.

The school became Altheimer High School in 1969, and the school received its final name around 1979. Martin served as the principal until he became the superintendent of the Altheimer-Sherrill School District in 1982. Another school building, 30,000-square-foot (2,800 m^{2}) large, was built in 1987; it included a gymnasium.

The Altheimer-Sherrill School District consolidated into the Altheimer Unified School District on September 1, 1993. Altheimer Unified consolidated into the Dollarway School District on July 10, 2006. In 2007 Altheimer-Sherrill High closed, with 102 middle school students and 137 high school students in its last year. Students were rezoned to Dollarway High School.

After the consolidation into Dollarway, the Altheimer-Sherrill High School school building was used as the Altheimer-Martin Elementary School until it closed in 2013.

== Academic performance ==
A 2011 State of Arkansas legislative research document stated that "Altheimer’s high school’s test scores were was [sic] just as low as Dollarway High’s."

== Athletics ==
The first athletic programs were organized when Fred Martin was principal.

The gymnasium was the Asive Thomas Memorial Gymnasium.

== Notable alumni ==
- Gloria Long Anderson attended Altheimer Training School
- Tyree Davis, former NFL wide receiver
- Willie Davis, former NFL wide receiver
