= Bogy Township =

Township in Jefferson County, Arkansas

Coordinates: 34°14′N 91°43′W

Bogy Township, officially the Township of Bogy, is a township in Jefferson County, in the U.S. state of Arkansas. The township was established in 1854. Its population was 54 as of the 2020 census.
