= Wabbaseka-Tucker School District =

Defunct school district in Arkansas, United States

Wabbaseka-Tucker School District, previously the Wabbaseka School District No. 7, was a school district in Jefferson County, Arkansas, serving Wabbaseka, Tucker, and Plum Bayou.

The district operated two schools: Wabbaseka Elementary School and Wabbaseka High School. At one time the district also operated Tucker Elementary School.

== History ==
By the 1980s the administration of the Plum Bayou-Tucker School District sought to be annexed by the Wabbaseka School District due to financial difficulties; the Plum Bayou-Tucker district was to be dissolved with Wabbaseka absorbing the new territory. On July 1, 1983, the consolidation into the Wabbaseka Tucker School District occurred. The former Plum Bayou-Tucker district had employed 21 teachers; the consolidated district retained 19 of them.

In 1989 the district had 283 students.

On September 1, 1993, the Wabbaseka-Tucker district consolidated with the Altheimer-Sherrill School District to form the Altheimer Unified School District. The territory merged into the Dollarway School District on July 10, 2006. and it joined the Pine Bluff School District effective July 1, 2021.

Jefferson County, Arkansas school district mergers

Pine Bluff	Linwood	Dollarway	Hardin	Altheimer-Sherrill	Wabbaseka	Plum Bayou-Tucker
	Pine Bluff		Dollarway		Wabbaseka-Tucker
					Altheimer Unified
			Dollarway
		Pine Bluff
