= Washington Township, Jefferson County, Arkansas =

Township in Jefferson County, Arkansas

Washington Township
- Township
- Location in Arkansas
- Coordinates: 34°15′N 92°11′W
- Country: United States
- State: Arkansas
- County: Jefferson
- Established: 1852 (174 years ago)

Area
  - Land: 162.9 sq mi (422 km^{2})
- Elevation: 318 ft (97 m)

Population (2020)
  - Total: 9,011
  - Density: 55.32/sq mi (21.36/km^{2})
- Time zone: UTC–6 (CST)
  - Summer (DST): UTC–5 (CDT)
- ZIP Codes: 71602, 71603, 72150
- Area code: 870
- GNIS feature ID: 66749
- Highways: Interstate 530; U.S. Highway 65; U.S. Highway 270; Highway 365
- Major airport: Clinton National Airport (LIT)

Washington Township, officially the Township of Washington, is a township in western Jefferson County, in the U.S. state of Arkansas. The township was established in 1852. Its population was 9,011 as of the 2020 census. The only municipality is White Hall.
