= Townsend Park High School =

Segregated high school in Pine Bluff, Arkansas

Coordinates: 34.23987°N 92.02876°W

Townsend Park High School was a segregated, all-black high school in Pine Bluff, Arkansas, operated by the Dollarway School District. As a result of the lawsuit Dove v. Parham, it was eventually merged into Dollarway High School.

== History ==
Prior to the Brown v Board of Education decision in 1954, Arkansas law required school districts to maintain separate schools for black and white students.

The Dollarway School District initially did not operate high schools, and black students went onwards to Merrill High School of the Pine Bluff School District. The Dollarway district began construction of a high school for black students in 1954, and it opened in 1955. The school was named after Townsend Park, which in turn was named after Merrill High principal William J. Townsend, and a federal grant financed the construction of the school. National Association for the Advancement of Colored People (NAACP) member William Dove opposed the school as he believed it would frustrate the process of having black and white students attend the same schools and that the Dollarway district would not attempt to get Townsend Park High accredited. In fall 1957 Townsend Park high was not yet accredited.

In the 1957–1958 school year the school had about 331 students. That year Dollarway district spent 28% less per capita to educate each Townsend Park High student than each student from Dollarway High School, and the district's per capita expenditure of $114 per Townsend Park High student was the least costly in the district.

In the post-Brown period, traditionally, schools were operated on a neighborhood basis, and this allowed the white-dominated school board to continue operating segregated schools because the neighborhoods themselves were segregated.

In 1959 the court case Dove v. Parham ruled that three negro students had the right to attend Dollarway High School. Segregationists including Jim Johnson and Amis Guthridge incited a riot and prevented this from happening for some period of time.

By 1962, Townsend Park High had one microscope in the biology laboratory, and the school only had paper typing keyboards. Townsend Park High was not accredited until March 20, 1963.

Because of the Civil Rights Act of 1964, the school board reluctantly instituted a choice plan, which resulted in a very small number of black students attending Dollarway, but no white students attending Townsend Park. A very small number of teachers had also been transferred between the old systems. Judge J. Smith Henley ruled in Cato v. Parham that this did not satisfy the requirement for integration. White members of the school board admitted that race was still a consideration in their zoning, and that they ignored the input of the board's only black member. Judge Henley ordered that the zoning be withdrawn and that the faculty be reassigned so that the percentages were approximately equal to the percentages of the population.

Townsend Park High consolidated into Dollarway High effective 1969, with Townsend Park High School becoming Townsend Park Elementary, which it remained until it closed in 2016. High school students were sent to Dollarway High School.

The school yearbook was known as The Eagle

== Notable people ==
Troy Neal, football player for the New York Jets
