= Pine Bluff School District =

School district in Arkansas, United States

Coordinates: 34.182°N 91.949°W

- 1215 W Pullen St Pine Bluff, Arkansas, 71601

District information
- Type: Public
- Grades: PreK–12
- NCES District ID: 0500026

Students and staff
- Students: 2,948
- Teachers: 185.51
- Staff: 269.5
- Student–teacher ratio: 15.89

Other information
- Website: www.pinebluffschools.org

Pine Bluff School District No. 3 (PBSD) is a school district headquartered in Pine Bluff, Arkansas. The district has 10 schools with over 3,800 students and 500 employees.

The headquarters are the Jordan-Chanay Administrative Center in Pine Bluff.

It is one of the largest school districts in the Pine Bluff Metropolitan Statistical Area.

== History ==
Previously the district served both black and white high school students from the Dollarway School District (DSD) as that district only went up to junior high school, with Merrill High and Pine Bluff High taking each group, respectively. This ended for black students in 1955 with the opening of Townsend Park High School and for white students the same year as the Pine Bluff district stopped accepting white Dollarway high school students due to overcrowding.

Due to the Civil Rights Movement, Pine Bluff schools desegregated.

On July 1, 1984, the Linwood School District consolidated into the Pine Bluff school district.

From 1988 to 2008 the school district's student population declined every year except for the period from 2006 to 2007. This reflected an economic turbulence in the Arkansas Delta region. In one period the student population decreased by 300. From 2007 to 2008 the student population decreased by 150.

From 2011 to 2015 the enrollment of the school district declined by 445, mirroring a decrease in population in the City of Pine Bluff, and that meant the State of Arkansas no longer sent over $1,900,000 to the district on a yearly basis. In 2015 the district board voted 5-1 to close two campuses: Southeast Middle School and Oak Park Elementary School. Accordingly the district changed the grade alignment, with Belair Middle becoming a grade 5-6 school, and Jack Robey Junior High being a grade 7-8 school. Previously the two schools had grades 6-7 and 8-9.

Michael Robinson, previously an employee at Prince George's County Public Schools in Maryland, became superintendent on June 6, 2016 and served in that capacity until June 30, 2018, when the board of directors bought out his contract. Monica King-McMurray, previously the executive director of learning services, became interim superintendent. The district, in August 2018, offered her a one-year contract. However the State of Arkansas took control of the school district in September of that year, so King-McMurray was forced out of her position and the board was dissolved.

The State of Arkansas appointed Jeremy Owoh as superintendent. Once he left to join the Little Rock School District, the state appointed Barbara Warren, effective July 1, 2020, to be superintendent of the Pine Bluff district; she already also served as superintendent of the DSD.

In December 2020 the Arkansas State Board of Education ruled that DSD should merge into the Pine Bluff School District as of July 1, 2021; all seven board members approved this. The post-merger Pine Bluff school district is to operate all existing schools from both districts. Accordingly the attendance boundary maps of the respective schools remained the same for the 2021-2022 school year, and all DSD territory became a part of the territory of the PBSD. PBSD took possession of all DSD schools. The Arkansas Board of Education mandated PBSD to keep the Dollarway schools in operation as a condition of the merger. In Spring 2022 the district chose to convert the two middle schools into a grade 7-9 configuration, though previously the plans were to merge them into a single middle school.

In 2023, the district consolidated Dollarway High into Pine Bluff High and all middle school capacity into Moorhead Middle.

Jefferson County, Arkansas school district mergers

Pine Bluff	Linwood	Dollarway	Hardin	Altheimer-Sherrill	Wabbaseka	Plum Bayou-Tucker
	Pine Bluff		Dollarway		Wabbaseka-Tucker
					Altheimer Unified
			Dollarway
		Pine Bluff

== Boundaries ==
Effective July 1, 2021, the district's service area includes sections of Pine Bluff, as well as Altheimer, Sherrill, and Wabbaseka.

It also includes various unincorporated areas including Hardin, Lake Dick, Linwood, Moscow, New Gascony, Noble Lake, Pastoria, Plum Bayou, Sweden, Tucker, and Wright.

== Demographics ==
In 2002 it had about 6,600 students.

In 2012 it had more than 4,279 students, with 84% being classified as low income, 96.77% being African-American, 2.13% being non-Hispanic white, and other racial identities at below 1%.

Circa 2015-2016 it had over 4,300 students.

In May 2020 the district had 2,921 students, and then in December that year the figure was down to 2,799.

== Schools ==
Secondary schools:

- Pine Bluff High School
- Robert F. Morehead Middle School
  - Its namesake is a former member of the board of trustees of the Dollarway School District. Morehead opened in 1999. It became a part of the Pine Bluff school district effective July 1, 2021.
  - The former Dollarway High School became a junior high academy for the 9th grade students, while the Morehead building housed grades 7-8.

Elementary schools:

- Broadmoor Elementary School - It is in southeast Pine Bluff
- 34th Avenue Elementary School - Formerly 34th Avenue Fine and Performing Arts Magnet School
- James Matthews Elementary School (effective July 1, 2021)
- Southwood Elementary School - In South-central Pine Bluff

Pre-K schools:

- Forrest Park/Greenville - In July 2021 it assumed responsibility as the pre-Kindergarten center for the entire district, including the territory from the former Dollarway district.

Alternative schools:

- First Ward Alternative School - Opened in 1990 as the Sixth Avenue Learning Center and is also known as the First Ward Learning Center. It not only includes current Pine Bluff district students but also services those in the Dollarway School District (prior to the July 1, 2021 merger)

=== Closed schools ===
High schools

- Dollarway High School (joined the district effective July 1, 2021, closing 2023)
- Merrill High School (school for black students)

Middle schools

- Belair Middle School - It was in eastern Pine Bluff. In 2012 the school had 282 students, with 95.74% being African-American. It served grades 6-7 until 2015, when it changed to grades 5-6. It closed between 2015 and 2021.
- Jack Robey Junior High School (closing 2023)
  - It was named after a superintendent of the Pine Bluff district. The campus opened in 1986. I. C. Murrell stated that, when it opened, it was "a shining, indoor fortress built more modern than its neighboring secondary schools". Its original name was Pine Bluff Junior High School; it received its final name in 1987. It served grades 8-9 until 2015, when it changed to grades 7-8. In 2023 the Pine Bluff district announced that the school will close, with all middle school students going to Morehead. According to the superintendent, Robey's facility is older than Morehead (and Dollarway High, which will be used to house some Morehead classes), and so Robey will be shuttered.
- Southeast Middle School - Closed 2015

Elementary

- Belair Math/Science Magnet School
- W. T. Cheney Elementary School - It was in far southeast Pine Bluff It closed between 2015 and 2021.
- Forrest Park Elementary School - It received an expansion in 1992, including media, office, and nurse facilities and four Kindergarten classrooms
- Greenville Elementary School
- Indiana Street Elementary School - Built 1948
- Lakeside Montessori School
- Oak Park Elementary School a.k.a. Oak Park Foreign Language and Communications Magnet School - Closed 2015
- Sam Taylor Computer Technology Magnet School - It was Sam Taylor Elementary School until it became a magnet school in 1992.
