= Antoine Barraque =

Founder of New Gascony, Arkansas

- Antoine Barraqué
- Born: April 15, 1773; France
- Died: October 29, 1858 (aged 85); Jefferson County, Arkansas, U.S.
- Other name: Antoine Barraque Sr.
- Occupations: Farmer; trader; soldier
- Known for: Founding New Gascony, Arkansas
- Spouse: Mary T. Dardenne (m. 1817)
- Children: 11
- Military service
- Allegiance: France
- Branch: Army
- Unit: Old Guard
- Wars: Napoleonic Wars

Antoine Barraque (April 15, 1773 – October 29, 1858), also known as Antoine Barraque Sr., was a French Indian trader who founded New Gascony, Arkansas.

== Early life ==
Barraque was born in France, on April 15, 1773. A veteran of Napoleon's Old Guard, he emigrated from France to the United States in 1816.

== Career ==
After emigrating, Barraque worked in the Indian trade at Arkansas Post and New Gascony, Arkansas. Barraque, who was fimiliar with the Quapaw Nation and married to a local Franco-American woman related to them, led the tribe to their new home in 1826 on lands given them by the Caddo on the Bayou Treache of Red River pursuant to the Treaty of 1824. He later served as the postmaster of New Gascony and Plum Bayou, Arkansas. Barraque was a business associate of Frederick Notrebe.

== Death ==
Barraque died on October 29, 1858, in Jefferson County, Arkansas, at the age of 85.

== Honors ==
Barraque Township in Jefferson County and Barraque Street in Pine Bluff, Arkansas, are named after him.
