= Wabbaseka, Arkansas =

- Town
- Location of Wabbaseka in Jefferson County, Arkansas.

- Location of Wabbaseka in the US
- Coordinates: 34°21′33″N 91°47′34″W
- Country: United States
- State: Arkansas
- County: Jefferson
- Township: Dunnington
- Incorporated: April 12, 1920; 106 years ago
- Named after: Wabbaseka Bayou

Government
  - Type: Mayor–Council
  - Mayor: (I)
  - Council: Wabbaseka Town Council

Area
  - Total: 0.34 sq mi (0.89 km^{2})
  - Land: 0.34 sq mi (0.89 km^{2})
  - Water: 0 sq mi (0.00 km^{2})
- Elevation: 200 ft (61 m)

Population (2020)
  - Total: 180
  - Estimate (2025): 168 ▼
  - Density: 523.5/sq mi (202.11/km^{2})
- Time zone: UTC-6 (Central (CST))
  - Summer (DST): UTC-5 (CDT)
- ZIP code: 72175
- Area code: 870
- FIPS code: 05-72230
- GNIS feature ID: 2406809
- Major airport: LIT

Wabbaseka is a town in Dunnington Township, Jefferson County, Arkansas, United States. As of the 2020 census, Wabbaseka had a population of 180. It is included in the Pine Bluff, Arkansas Micropolitan Statistical Area.

== Etymology ==
Wabbaseka is a misinterpretation of the Quapaw name Wadittesha Wattiska, meaning "Black Clay Bayou." French trader Antoine Barraque visited Chief Heckaton, a Quapaw leader who told him the local name of the region. A surveyor named William Pelham later recorded the body of water as "Bayou Wabbaseekee."

== Geography ==
According to the United States Census Bureau, the city has a total area of 0.4 square miles (1.0 km^{2}), all land.

== Demographics ==
Historical population
| Census | Pop. | Note | %± |
|---|---|---|---|
| 1930 | 333 | | — |
| 1940 | 258 | | −22.5% |
| 1950 | 375 | | 45.3% |
| 1960 | 432 | | 15.2% |
| 1970 | 644 | | 49.1% |
| 1980 | 428 | | −33.5% |
| 1990 | 332 | | −22.4% |
| 2000 | 323 | | −2.7% |
| 2010 | 255 | | −21.1% |
| 2020 | 180 | | −29.4% |
| 2025 (est.) | 168 | ▼ | −6.7% |
U.S. Decennial Census

=== Racial and ethnic composition ===
Wabbaseka, Arkansas – Racial and ethnic composition Note: the US Census treats Hispanic/Latino as an ethnic category. This table excludes Latinos from the racial categories and assigns them to a separate category. Hispanics/Latinos may be of any race.
| Race / Ethnicity (NH = Non-Hispanic) | Pop 2000 | Pop 2010 | Pop 2020 | % 2000 | % 2010 | % 2020 |
|---|---|---|---|---|---|---|
| White alone (NH) | 49 | 54 | 34 | 15.17% | 21.18% | 18.89% |
| Black or African American alone (NH) | 272 | 193 | 138 | 84.21% | 75.69% | 76.67% |
| Native American or Alaska Native alone (NH) | 0 | 1 | 0 | 0.00% | 0.39% | 0.00% |
| Asian alone (NH) | 0 | 0 | 0 | 0.00% | 0.00% | 0.00% |
| Native Hawaiian or Pacific Islander alone (NH) | 0 | 0 | 0 | 0.00% | 0.00% | 0.00% |
| Other race alone (NH) | 0 | 0 | 0 | 0.00% | 0.00% | 0.00% |
| Mixed race or Multiracial (NH) | 2 | 3 | 0 | 0.62% | 1.18% | 0.00% |
| Hispanic or Latino (any race) | 0 | 4 | 8 | 0.00% | 1.57% | 4.44% |
| Total | 323 | 255 | 180 | 100.00% | 100.00% | 100.00% |

=== 2000 census ===
As of the census of 2000, there were 323 people, 132 households, and 83 families residing in the city. The population density was 873.3 inhabitants per square mile (337.2/km^{2}). There were 150 housing units at an average density of 405.5 units per square mile (156.6 units/km^{2}). The racial makeup of the city was 84.21% Black or African American, 15.17% White, and 0.62% from two or more races.

There were 132 households, out of which 25.0% had children under the age of 18 living with them, 44.7% were married couples living together, 17.4% had a female householder with no husband present, and 36.4% were non-families. 35.6% of all households were made up of individuals, and 15.9% had someone living alone who was 65 years of age or older. The average household size was 2.45 and the average family size was 3.18.

In the city the population was spread out, with 27.9% under the age of 18, 7.1% from 18 to 24, 22.3% from 25 to 44, 21.1% from 45 to 64, and 21.7% who were 65 years of age or older. The median age was 38 years. For every 100 females, there were 95.8 males. For every 100 females age 18 and over, there were 92.6 males.

The median income for a household in the city was $14,792, and the median income for a family was $24,375. Males had a median income of $16,250 versus $28,750 for females. The per capita income for the city was $10,902. About 28.1% of families and 30.7% of the population were below the poverty line, including 44.8% of those under age 18 and 31.1% of those age 65 or over.

== Education ==
Wabbaseka is served by the Pine Bluff School District. Students are zoned to Park/Greenville School for preschool, James Matthews Elementary School, Robert F. Morehead Middle School, and Dollarway High School.

It was formerly served by the Wabbaseka-Tucker School District (previously the Wabbaseka School District), which operated schools on a 12-acre (4.9 ha) property in the city. Altheimer-Sherrill School District annexed the former Wabbaseka-Tucker School District on August 16, 1993. As the Altheimer Unified School District it began operations on September 1, 1993. Altheimer Unified operated two schools: Martin Elementary School and Altheimer-Sherrill High School. The Altheimer Unified School District consolidated into the Dollarway School District on July 10, 2006.

Altheimer Unified ended all use of the Wabbaseka school property in 1996. The district sold the Wabbaseka school property to the City of Wabbaseka for $674,623 in the 2001 fiscal year. By June 2001 this property was not yet used for a new purpose. Demolition of most of the school occurred in January 2011, but the chemical storage room was untouched when the crews discovered the presence of various chemicals. The Environmental Protection Agency (EPA) removed the chemicals in May 2011.

In December 2020 the Arkansas State Board of Education ruled that the Dollarway School District should merge into the Pine Bluff School District as of July 1, 2021; the post-merger school district operates all existing schools from both districts. Accordingly, the attendance boundary maps of the respective schools remained the same for the 2021–2022 school year, and all DSD territory became a part of the PBSD territory. The exception was with the pre-kindergarten levels, as all PBSD areas are now assigned to Forrest Park/Greenville School, including the territory from the former Dollarway district. In 2023 the district announced that Dollarway High would merge into Pine Bluff High School, and that Morehead Middle School would become the only middle school for all of the Pine Bluff School District.

== Notable people ==
- Eldridge Cleaver (1935–1998), born in Wabbaseka, Minister of Information for the Black Panther Party, author of Soul on Ice
- Willie K. Hocker (1862–1944), lived in Dunnington Township, designer of the Arkansas state flag

== See also ==
- List of municipalities in Arkansas
- National Register of Historic Places listings in Jefferson County, Arkansas
