= Sherrill, Arkansas =

- Town
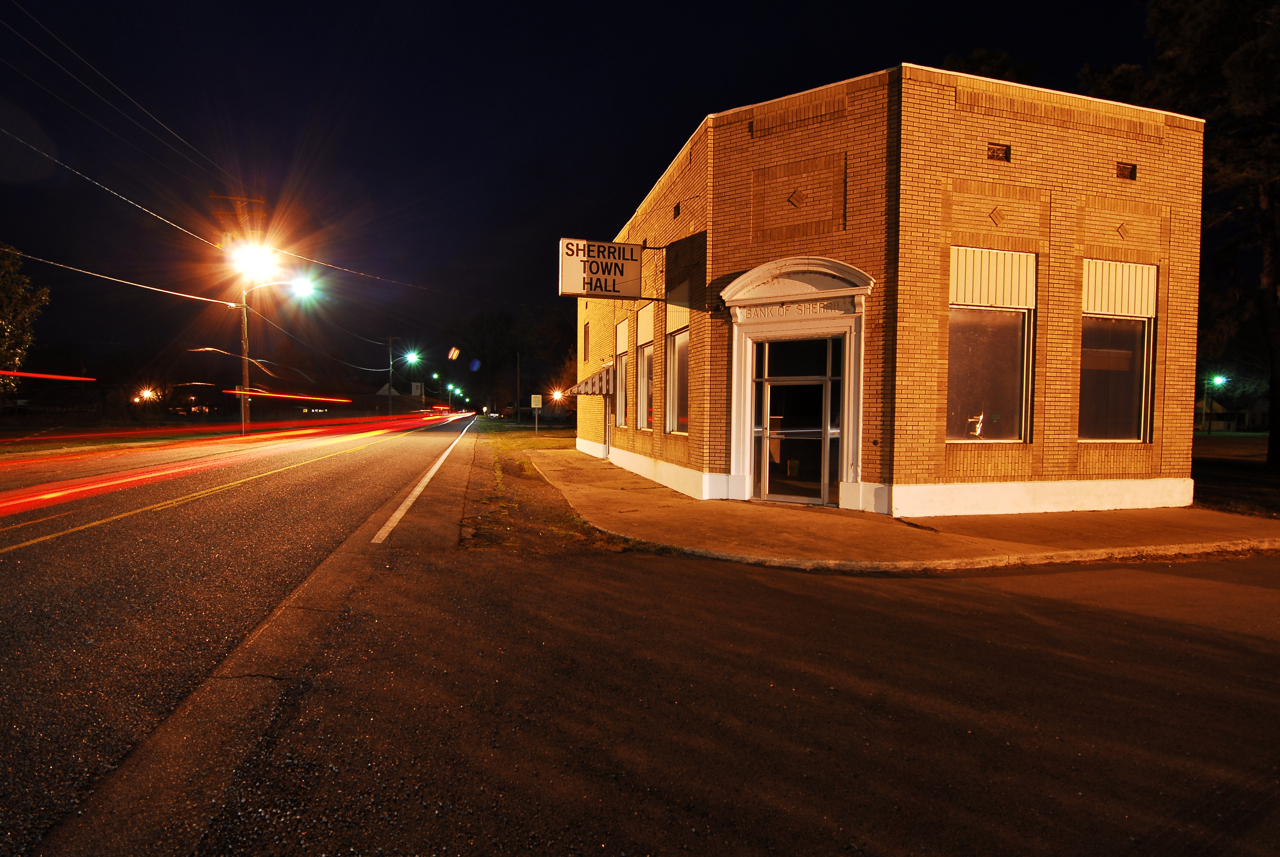
- Downtown Sherrill

- Location of Sherrill in Jefferson County, Arkansas.

- Location of Sherrill in the US
- Coordinates: 34°23′06″N 91°57′07″W
- Country: United States
- State: Arkansas
- County: Jefferson
- Township: Plum Bayou
- Incorporated: May 25, 1935; 91 years ago
- Named for: Dr. Albert Rush Sherrill

Government
  - Type: Mayor–Council
  - Mayor: Jody Campbell (I)
  - Council: Sherrill Town Council

Area
  - Total: 0.13 sq mi (0.34 km^{2})
  - Land: 0.13 sq mi (0.34 km^{2})
  - Water: 0 sq mi (0.00 km^{2})
- Elevation: 220 ft (67 m)

Population (2020)
  - Total: 53
  - Estimate (2025): 51 ▼
  - Density: 402.9/sq mi (155.56/km^{2})
- Time zone: UTC-6 (Central (CST))
  - Summer (DST): UTC-5 (CDT)
- ZIP code: 72152
- Area code: 870
- FIPS code: 05-63740
- GNIS feature ID: 2407326
- Major airport: LIT

Sherrill is a town in Plum Bayou Township, Jefferson County, Arkansas, United States. As of the 2020 census, Sherrill had a population of 53. It is included in the Pine Bluff, Arkansas Micropolitan Statistical Area.

== Geography ==
According to the United States Census Bureau, the town has a total area of 0.4 km^{2} (0.1 mi^{2}), all land.

== Demographics ==
Historical population
| Census | Pop. | Note | %± |
|---|---|---|---|
| 1940 | 258 | | — |
| 1950 | 263 | | 1.9% |
| 1960 | 241 | | −8.4% |
| 1970 | 208 | | −13.7% |
| 1980 | 161 | | −22.6% |
| 1990 | 55 | | −65.8% |
| 2000 | 126 | | 129.1% |
| 2010 | 84 | | −33.3% |
| 2020 | 53 | | −36.9% |
| 2025 (est.) | 51 | ▼ | −3.8% |
U.S. Decennial Census

=== Racial and ethnic composition ===
Sherrill town, Arkansas – Racial and ethnic composition Note: the US Census treats Hispanic/Latino as an ethnic category. This table excludes Latinos from the racial categories and assigns them to a separate category. Hispanics/Latinos may be of any race.
| Race / Ethnicity (NH = Non-Hispanic) | Pop 2000 | Pop 2010 | Pop 2020 | % 2000 | % 2010 | % 2020 |
|---|---|---|---|---|---|---|
| White alone (NH) | 102 | 36 | 36 | 80.95% | 42.86% | 67.92% |
| Black or African American alone (NH) | 24 | 47 | 16 | 19.05% | 55.95% | 30.19% |
| Native American or Alaska Native alone (NH) | 0 | 0 | 0 | 0.00% | 0.00% | 0.00% |
| Asian alone (NH) | 0 | 0 | 0 | 0.00% | 0.00% | 0.00% |
| Native Hawaiian or Pacific Islander alone (NH) | 0 | 0 | 0 | 0.00% | 0.00% | 0.00% |
| Other race alone (NH) | 0 | 0 | 0 | 0.00% | 0.00% | 0.00% |
| Mixed race or Multiracial (NH) | 0 | 0 | 1 | 0.00% | 0.00% | 1.89% |
| Hispanic or Latino (any race) | 0 | 1 | 0 | 0.00% | 1.19% | 0.00% |
| Total | 126 | 84 | 53 | 100.00% | 100.00% | 100.00% |

=== 2010 census ===
As of the census of 2010, there were 84 people, 37 households, and 25 families residing in the town. The population density was 347.5/km^{2} (900/mi^{2}). There were 54 housing units at an average density of 148.9/km^{2} (386/mi^{2}). The racial makeup of the town was 44.0% White and 56.0% Black or African American.

There were 37 households, out of which 10.8% had children under the age of 18 living with them, 43.2% were married couples living together, 16.2% had a female householder with no husband present, and 32.4% were non-families. 32.4% of all households were made up of individuals, and 0.0% had someone living alone who was 65 years of age or older. The average household size was 2.27 and the average family size was 2.84.

In the town, the population was spread out, with 16.7% under the age of 18, 5.6% from 18 to 24, 27.8% from 25 to 44, 31.0% from 45 to 64, and 11.9% who were 65 years of age or older. The median age was 50.5 years. For every 100 females, there were 103.2 males. For every 100 females age 18 and over, there were 92.0 males.

The median income for a household in the town was $23,750, and the median income for a family was $24,643. Males had a median income of $32,813 versus $21,250 for females. The per capita income for the town was $15,096. There were 16.2% of families and 21.8% of the population living below the poverty line, including 30.3% of under eighteens and 26.7% of those over 64.

== Education ==
Sherrill is served by the Pine Bluff School District. Students are zoned to Park/Greenville School for preschool, James Matthews Elementary School, Robert F. Morehead Middle School, and Dollarway High School.

At one point it was served by the Sherrill School District, which operated Sherrill Elementary School. The Altheimer-Sherrill district was created in 1979 when the Altheimer and Sherrill districts merged.

On September 1, 1993, Altheimer-Sherrill consolidated into the Altheimer Unified School District; Altheimer Unified operated two schools: Martin Elementary School and Altheimer-Sherrill High School. The Altheimer Unified School District consolidated into the Dollarway School District on July 10, 2006. Altheimer-Sherrill High closed in 2007, with students moved to Dollarway High. Altheimer Martin Elementary School closed in 2013.

In December 2020 the Arkansas State Board of Education ruled that the Dollarway School District should merge into the Pine Bluff School District as of July 1, 2021; the post-merger school district is to operate all existing schools from both districts. Accordingly, the attendance boundary maps of the respective schools remained the same for the 2021–2022 school year, and all DSD territory became a part of the PBSD territory. The exception was with the pre-kindergarten levels, as all PBSD areas are now assigned to Forrest Park/Greenville School, including the territory from the former Dollarway district. In 2023 the district announced that Dollarway High would merge into Pine Bluff High School, and that Morehead Middle School would become the only middle school for all of the Pine Bluff School District.

== See also ==
- List of municipalities in Arkansas
- National Register of Historic Places listings in Jefferson County, Arkansas
