= Altheimer, Arkansas =

City in Arkansas, United States

- City
- Location in Jefferson County and the state of Arkansas

- Location in the United States
- Coordinates: 34°19′27″N 91°50′53″W
- Country: United States
- State: Arkansas
- County: Jefferson
- Township: Plum Bayou
- Founded: 1886
- Incorporated: 1919
- Named for: Joseph and Louis Altheimer

Government
  - Type: Mayor–Council
  - Mayor: (I)
  - Council: City Council

Area
  - City: 2.12 sq mi (5.49 km^{2})
  - Land: 2.05 sq mi (5.31 km^{2})
  - Water: 0.069 sq mi (0.18 km^{2})
- Elevation: 210 ft (64 m)

Population (2020)
  - City: 696
  - Estimate (2025): 642 ▼
  - Density: 339.6/sq mi (131.11/km^{2})
  - Metro: 100,258
- Time zone: UTC-6 (Central (CST))
  - Summer (DST): UTC-5 (CDT)
- ZIP code: 72004
- Area code: 870
- FIPS code: 05-01150
- GNIS feature ID: 2403090
- Major airport: LIT

Altheimer (/ˈɑːl.taɪmər/ ALL-timer) is a city in Plum Bayou Township, Jefferson County, Arkansas, United States. As of the 2020 census, Altheimer had a population of 696.

== History ==
The city was named for brothers Joseph and Louis Altheimer, two Pine Bluff merchants. Louis, who was born in Eberstadt in 1850, read stories by German adventurer Frederick Gerstacker telling of the rich natural resources in Arkansas, and left for America as a teenager, eventually settling in Pine Bluff. Louis brought his brother Joseph with him to the land that would eventually bear their name. Joseph's son, Benjamin, became a successful attorney, establishing the prominent Chicago law firm of Altheimer, Mayer, Woods, and Smith (later known as Altheimer & Gray), and serving twice as president of Chicago's Iroquois Club, the city's oldest Democratic Party political club. Benjamin owned 15,000 acres (61 km^{2}) of land in Arkansas. His foundation, the Ben J. Altheimer Foundation, provided scholarships and funding for projects throughout the state and continues today as the Ben J. Altheimer Charitable Foundation, Inc.

Altheimer is home to many restored pioneer-era log cabins, Victorian era plantation houses and museums. One of the most prominent locations is The Elms, a former plantation house on the Collier Estate built in 1886, renovated by Ben Altheimer in the 1930s. Listed on the National Register of Historic Places, The Elms is open to the public for retreats, family reunions and tours. Also located on the property are the Elms Duck Lodges, which provides hunting and fishing in the private lake and pond. Roselawn, also known as the Collier-Barnett House, was built in 1875 and added to National Register of Historic Places in 1978. Lake Dick is an oxbow lake located four miles (6.4 km) south of Altheimer. This area formerly held farmsteads of eighty white American families who were moved into the area in 1936 as part of the Farm Security Administration. Lake Dick was added to the register in 1975.

In 2007 and 2013, respectively, Altheimer's secondary and elementary schools closed. As a result, a number of residents moved to Pine Bluff to be closer to the zoned schools operated by the Dollarway School District, and multiple businesses lost revenue.

== Geography ==
Altheimer is part of the Timberlands Region, an area rich in natural resources that was discovered by pioneers from the eastern states in the early 19th century. Deer hunting, bass fishing, timber and oil are plentiful in this area.

Altheimer is in northeastern Jefferson County, 14 miles (23 km) northeast of Pine Bluff, the county seat. U.S. Route 63/79 runs along the northwestern edge of the city, leading southwest to Pine Bluff and northeast 11 miles (18 km) to Humphrey. Little Rock, the state capital, is 50 miles (80 km) to the northwest by road.

According to the U.S. Census Bureau, Altheimer has a total area of 2.2 square miles (5.6 km^{2}), of which 2.1 square miles (5.4 km^{2}) are land and 0.1 square miles (0.2 km^{2}), or 3.22%, are water. Flat Bayou winds through the center of the city, flowing north toward Wabbaseka Bayou, which in turn flows southeast via a succession of names to the Arkansas River.

== Demographics ==
Historical population
Census	Pop.	Note	%±
1920	450		—
1930	475		5.6%
1940	494		4.0%
1950	680		37.7%
1960	979		44.0%
1970	1,037		5.9%
1980	1,231		18.7%
1990	972		−21.0%
2000	1,192		22.6%
2010	984		−17.4%
2020	696		−29.3%
2025 (est.)	642	▼	−7.8%
Encyclopedia of Arkansas History and Culture

=== Racial and ethnic composition ===
Altheimer city, Arkansas – Racial and ethnic composition Note: the US Census treats Hispanic/Latino as an ethnic category. This table excludes Latinos from the racial categories and assigns them to a separate category. Hispanics/Latinos may be of any race.
Race / Ethnicity (NH = Non-Hispanic)	Pop 2000	Pop 2010	Pop 2020	% 2000	% 2010	% 2020
White alone (NH)	128	92	36	10.74%	9.35%	5.17%
Black or African American alone (NH)	1,042	864	641	87.42%	87.80%	92.10%
Native American or Alaska Native alone (NH)	0	0	1	0.00%	0.00%	0.14%
Asian alone (NH)	1	10	3	0.08%	1.02%	0.43%
Native Hawaiian or Pacific Islander alone (NH)	0	0	0	0.00%	0.00%	0.00%
Other race alone (NH)	0	2	0	0.00%	0.20%	0.00%
Mixed race or Multiracial (NH)	8	2	9	0.67%	0.20%	1.29%
Hispanic or Latino (any race)	13	14	6	1.09%	1.42%	0.86%
Total	1,192	984	696	100.00%	100.00%	100.00%

=== 2000 Census ===
As of the census of 2010, there were 984 people, 361 households, and 248 families residing in the city. The racial makeup of the city was 10% White, 88.1% Black or African American, 1% Asian, 0.6% from other races, and 0.3% from two or more races. 1.4% of the population were Hispanic or Latino of any race.

There were 361 households, out of which 25.8% had children under the age of 18 living with them, 37.1% were married couples living together, 24.1% had a female householder with no husband present, and 31.3% were non-families. 27.1% of all households were made up of individuals, and 2.2% had someone living alone who was 65 years of age or older. The average household size was 2.73 and the average family size was 3.29.

In the city, the population was spread out, with 29.3% under the age of 18, 7.4% from 15 to 19, 7.0% from 40 to 44, 5.3% from 60 to 64, and 13.7% who were 65 years of age or older. The median age was 36.9 years.

The median income for a household in the city was $32,500, and the median income for a family was $34,153. About 30.9% of families and 35.3% of the population were below the poverty line, including 60.4% of those under age 18 and 3.9% of those age 65 or over.

== Arts and culture ==
The Pine Bluff and Jefferson County Library System operates the Altheimer Branch, an about 3,500 square feet (330 m^{2}) building identical to that of the Redfield Library, located on a 1-acre (0.40 ha) tract in Altheimer. The library was built on land sold by Altheimer Unified to the county government for $3,784. The library was constructed in October 2001.

== Education ==
=== Primary and secondary schools ===
Altheimer is served by the Pine Bluff School District. Students are zoned to Park/Greenville School for preschool, James Matthews Elementary School, Robert F. Morehead Middle School, and Dollarway High School.

In the racial segregation era Altheimer Training School served as the high school for African-Americans, while Altheimer High School served as the high school for white students. At one point it was served by the Altheimer School District, which operated Martin Elementary School, Martin High School, Altheimer Elementary School, and Altheimer High School in Altheimer. The Altheimer-Sherrill district was created in 1979 when the Altheimer and Sherrill districts merged.

On September 1, 1993, Altheimer-Sherrill consolidated into the Altheimer Unified School District; Altheimer Unified operated two schools: Martin Elementary School and Altheimer-Sherrill High School. The Altheimer Unified School District consolidated into the Dollarway School District on July 10, 2006.

Altheimer-Martin Elementary School, a Dollarway School District elementary school, occupied the former high school facility. The 30,000-square-foot (2,800 m^{2}) building was built in 1987; it included a gymnasium. Up to 2013 the school's enrollment declined, and in 2013 the Dollarway superintendent decided that the school should be closed in light of the declining attendance. In its final year the school had 78 students. Since 2013 some property had been taken from the school building, and a lack of maintenance occurred. Altheimer mayor Zola Hudson stated a desire for the city government to repurpose the building. By 2018 the district was proceeding to donate the elementary building.

Altheimer Middle School and Altheimer-Sherrill High School both closed in 2007. At the time the middle school had 102 students and the high school had 137 students.

In December 2020 the Arkansas State Board of Education ruled that the Dollarway School District should merge into the Pine Bluff School District as of July 1, 2021; the post-merger school district is to operate all existing schools from both districts. Accordingly, the attendance boundary maps of the respective schools remained the same for the 2021–2022 school year, and all DSD territory went to be within the PBSD territory. The exception was with the pre-kindergarten levels, as all PBSD areas are now assigned to Forrest Park/Greenville School, including the territory from the former Dollarway district. In 2023 the district announced that Dollarway High would merge into Pine Bluff High School, and that Morehead Middle School would become the only middle school for all of the Pine Bluff School District.

== Notable people ==
- Gloria Long Anderson (born November 5, 1938) American chemist
- Tail Dragger Jones (born James Yancey Jones, 1940), American Chicago blues singer
- James McDonnell (1899–1980), American aerospace engineer

== See also ==
- List of municipalities in Arkansas
- List of places in the United States named after people
- National Register of Historic Places listings in Jefferson County, Arkansas
