= Jefferson County, Arkansas =

County in Arkansas, United States

- County
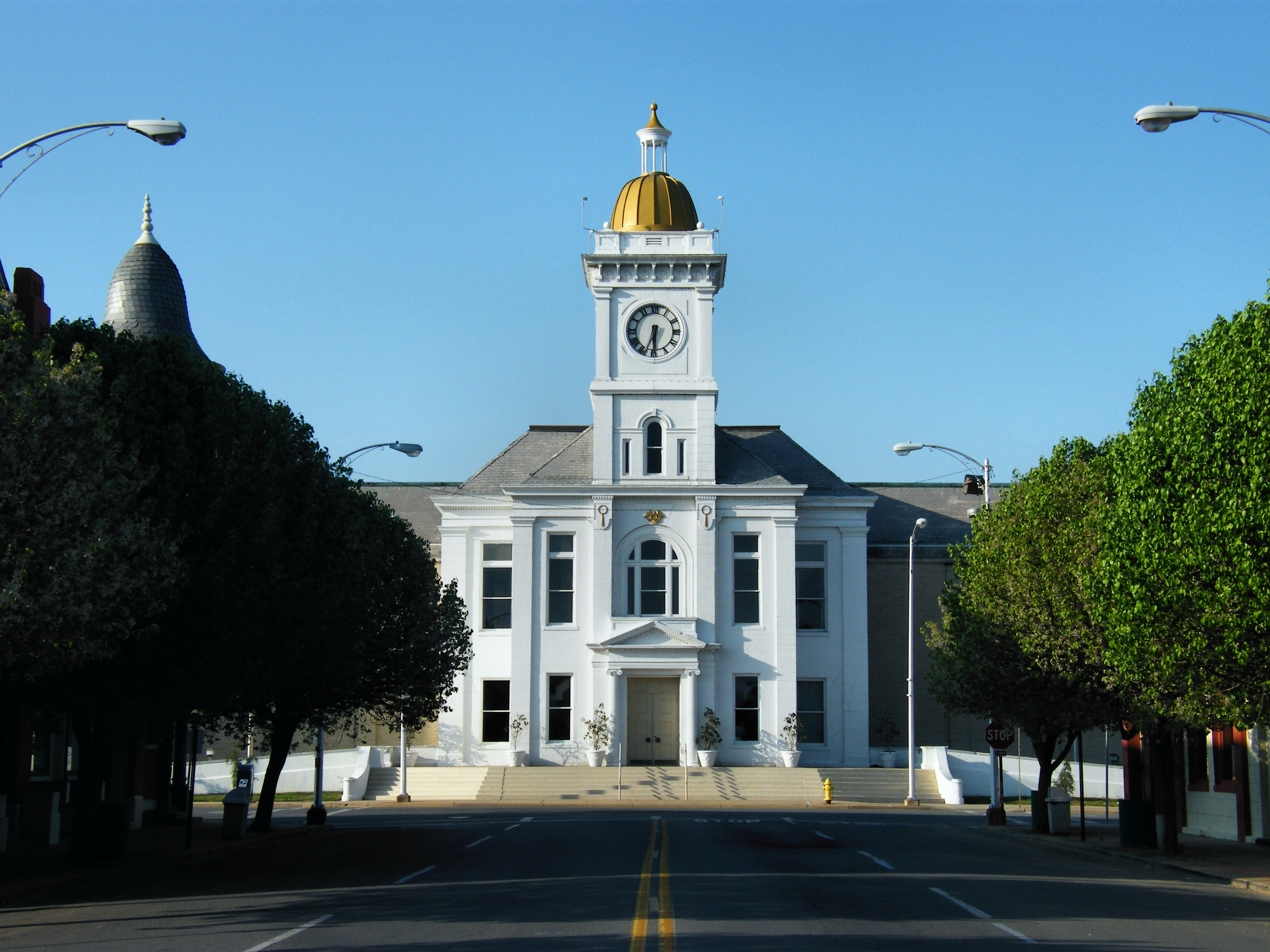
- South façade of the Jefferson County Courthouse at Pine Bluff, Arkansas

- Location within the U.S. state of Arkansas
- Coordinates: 34°17′15″N 91°56′32″W
- Country: United States
- State: Arkansas
- Established: November 2, 1829 (197 years ago)
- Named for: Thomas Jefferson
- Seat: Pine Bluff
- Largest city: Pine Bluff
- Other cities: Altheimer, Humphrey, Redfield, White Hall

Government
  - County Judge: Gerald Robinson (D)

Area
  - Total: 914 sq mi (2,370 km^{2})
  - Land: 871 sq mi (2,260 km^{2})
  - Water: 43 sq mi (110 km^{2}) 4.7%

Population (2020)
  - Total: 67,260
  - Estimate (2025): 62,987 ▼
  - Density: 77.2/sq mi (29.8/km^{2})
- Time zone: UTC−6 (Central)
  - Summer (DST): UTC−5 (CDT)
- ZIP Codes: 71601–71603, 71644, 71659, 72004, 72046, 72073, 72079, 72132, 72150, 72152, 72160, 72168, 72175
- Area code: 501, 870
- Congressional district: 4th
- Website: jeffersoncountyar.gov

Jefferson County is a county located in the U.S. state of Arkansas in the area known as the Arkansas Delta that extends west of the Mississippi River. Jefferson County consists of five cities, two towns, and 20 townships. It is bisected by the Arkansas River, which was critical to its development and long the chief transportation byway. In 2020, Jefferson County's population was estimated at 67,260. The county seat and most populous city is Pine Bluff. The county is included in the Pine Bluff micropolitan statistical area.

Jefferson County was formed from Vaugine Township, Pulaski County and Richland Township, Arkansas County in the Arkansas Territory on November 2, 1829. It is named for Thomas Jefferson, third U.S. president. It was the site of the Battle of Pine Bluff on October 25, 1863.

== History ==
The area now known as Jefferson County was occupied by the Quapaw when Henri de Tonti established Arkansas Post in 1686. De Tonti claimed the area for Louis XIV, King of France.

In March 1819, Robert Crittenden was appointed secretary of the Arkansas Territory. That same year, Joseph Bonne, traveling upstream on the Arkansas River from Arkansas Post, built a cabin on a "high bluff covered with pine trees" on the river's south bank. Several years later, James Scull, also from Arkansas Post, established a tavern and small inn on the river's north bank, across from what would become the site of Pine Bluff. Five years later, Secretary Crittenden convinced the remaining Quapaw to sign a treaty with the U.S. government relinquishing what remained of their tribal lands.

Steamboat travel led to expanding settlement, bringing to the area such men as French émigré Antoine Barraqué, Indian trader and veteran of the Napoleonic Wars (a township in northwest Jefferson County and Pine Bluff's principal east–west street are both named for him), and brothers James T. and John Pullen (main thoroughfares are both named for them). On November 2, 1829, Territorial Governor John Pope—Crittenden's successor—approved the establishment of Jefferson County. Though Bonne's cabin was initially used; by August 1832, "Pine Bluff Town" became the permanent county seat."

The land in the county was developed as large cotton plantations, with fronts on the river for transportation. The plantations were dependent on the labor of enslaved African Americans, who comprised a majority of the population in the county well before the American Civil War. After the war, planters in Jefferson County gradually resumed cotton cultivation and processing. The economy was driven by cotton and the Delta area was highly productive.

Because of the county's large African-American population, it was a center of Black political power in the decades after the Civil War before Jim Crow eliminated nearly all Black participation in politics. Twenty-two different African Americans from Jefferson County were elected to the Arkansas state legislature between 1871 and 1893, by far the most from any county.

In 1886, Jefferson County produced 55,120 bales of cotton, the most in Arkansas, and the second-most throughout the South. Transportation companies serving the county at the time included the Cotton Belt Route, the St. Louis – San Francisco Railway, Missouri Pacific, the Arkansas River Packet Company, the Wiley Jones Street Car Lines, and the Citizens Street Railway Company.

== Geography ==
According to the U.S. Census Bureau, the county has a total area of 914 square miles (2,370 km^{2}), of which 871 square miles (2,260 km^{2}) is land and 43 square miles (110 km^{2}) (4.7%) is water. The county is located approximately 43 miles (69 km) southeast of Little Rock, 144 miles (232 km) southwest of Memphis, Tennessee, and 218 miles (351 km)

=== Transit ===
- Pine Bluff Transit

=== Major highways ===
- I-530 / AR 530
- US 63
- US 65
- US 65
  - US 65B
- US 79
  - US 79B
- US 270
- US 425
- AR 11
- AR 15
- AR 31
- AR 46
- AR 51
- AR 54
- AR 81
- AR 88
- AR 104
- AR 133
- AR 190
- AR 199
- AR 256
- AR 365
- AR 463
- AR 980

=== Adjacent counties ===
- Lonoke County (northeast)
- Arkansas County (east)
- Lincoln County (southeast)
- Cleveland County (southwest)
- Grant County (west)
- Pulaski County (northwest)

== Demographics ==
Historical population
Census	Pop.	Note	%±
1830	772		—
1840	2,566		232.4%
1850	5,834		127.4%
1860	14,971		156.6%
1870	15,733		5.1%
1880	22,386		42.3%
1890	40,881		82.6%
1900	40,972		0.2%
1910	52,734		28.7%
1920	60,330		14.4%
1930	64,154		6.3%
1940	65,101		1.5%
1950	76,075		16.9%
1960	81,373		7.0%
1970	85,329		4.9%
1980	90,718		6.3%
1990	85,487		−5.8%
2000	84,278		−1.4%
2010	77,435		−8.1%
2020	67,260		−13.1%
2025 (est.)	62,987	▼	−6.4%
U.S. Decennial Census; 1790–1960 1900–1990; 1990–2000 2010–2016

=== Racial and ethnic composition ===
Jefferson County, Arkansas – Racial and ethnic composition Note: the US Census treats Hispanic/Latino as an ethnic category. This table excludes Latinos from the racial categories and assigns them to a separate category. Hispanics/Latinos may be of any race.
Race / Ethnicity (NH = Non-Hispanic)	Pop 1980	Pop 1990	Pop 2000	Pop 2010	Pop 2020	% 1980	% 1990	% 2000	% 2010	% 2020
White alone (NH)	52,990	47,706	40,475	32,050	25,230	58.41%	55.80%	48.03%	41.39%	37.51%
Black or African American alone (NH)	36,449	36,771	41,623	42,485	37,712	40.18%	43.01%	49.39%	54.87%	56.07%
Native American or Alaska Native alone (NH)	188	220	192	201	212	0.21%	0.26%	0.23%	0.26%	0.32%
Asian alone (NH)	260	347	542	595	664	0.29%	0.41%	0.64%	0.77%	0.99%
Native Hawaiian or Pacific Islander alone (NH)	x	x	24	9	93	x	x	0.03%	0.01%	0.14%
Other race alone (NH)	96	16	41	52	164	0.11%	0.02%	0.05%	0.07%	0.24%
Mixed race or Multiracial (NH)	x	x	571	824	1,697	x	x	0.68%	1.06%	2.52%
Hispanic or Latino (any race)	735	427	810	1,219	1,488	0.81%	0.50%	0.96%	1.57%	2.21%
Total	90,718	85,487	84,278	77,435	67,260	100.00%	100.00%	100.00%	100.00%	100.00%

=== 2020 census ===
As of the 2020 census, the county had a population of 67,260. The median age was 40.7 years. 20.8% of residents were under the age of 18 and 17.9% of residents were 65 years of age or older. For every 100 females there were 98.6 males, and for every 100 females age 18 and over there were 96.9 males age 18 and over.

The racial makeup of the county was 37.9% White, 56.3% Black or African American, 0.4% American Indian and Alaska Native, 1.0% Asian, 0.1% Native Hawaiian and Pacific Islander, 1.3% from some other race, and 3.1% from two or more races. Hispanic or Latino residents of any race comprised 2.2% of the population.

69.4% of residents lived in urban areas, while 30.6% lived in rural areas.

There were 26,264 households in the county, of which 28.7% had children under the age of 18 living in them. Of all households, 36.0% were married-couple households, 21.1% were households with a male householder and no spouse or partner present, and 37.5% were households with a female householder and no spouse or partner present. About 32.7% of all households were made up of individuals and 13.2% had someone living alone who was 65 years of age or older.

There were 30,573 housing units, of which 14.1% were vacant. Among occupied housing units, 62.5% were owner-occupied and 37.5% were renter-occupied. The homeowner vacancy rate was 2.2% and the rental vacancy rate was 12.0%.

=== 2010 census ===
As of the 2010 census, there were 77,435 people living in the county. 55.1% were Black or African American, 42.0% White, 0.8% Asian, 0.3% Native American, 0.7% of some other race and 1.2% of two or more races. 1.6% were Hispanic or Latino (of any race).

=== 2000 census ===
As of the 2000 census, there were 84,278 people, 30,555 households, and 21,510 families living in the county. The population density was 95 inhabitants per square mile (37/km^{2}). There were 34,350 housing units at an average density of 39 per square mile (15/km^{2}). The racial makeup of the county was 49.58% Black or African American, 48.46% White, 0.24% Native American, 0.66% Asian, 0.04% Pacific Islander, 0.26% from other races, and 0.76% from two or more races. 0.96% of the population were Hispanic or Latino of any race. By comparison, the county had 15,714 residents in 1870, 20% of whom were White.

In the county, there were 30,555 households, out of which 33.10% had children under the age of 18 living with them, 47.40% were married couples living together, 18.80% had a female householder with no husband present, and 29.60% were non-families. 26.20% of all households were made up of individuals, and 10.60% had someone living alone who was 65 years of age or older. The average household size was 2.59 and the average family size was 3.13. The population was spread out, with 26.30% under the age of 18, 10.80% from 18 to 24, 27.80% from 25 to 44, 22.10% from 45 to 64, and 12.90% who were 65 years of age or older. The median age was 35 years. For every 100 females, there were 95.90 males. For every 100 females age 18 and over, there were 93.40 males.

Jefferson County experienced a decline in population between 2000 and 2010 of 8.1%. The county has continued to decline in population since 2010, showing a 3.5% decrease in population to 74,723 between the 2010 census and the 2012 (-3.5%) census estimates.

The median income for a household in the county was $31,327, and the median income for a family was $38,252. Males had a median income of $31,848 versus $21,867 for females. The per capita income for the county was $15,417. About 16.00% of families and 20.50% of the population were below the poverty line, including 29.60% of those under age 18 and 17.80% of those age 65 or over.

== Government and infrastructure ==
=== Government ===
The county government is a constitutional body granted specific powers by the Constitution of Arkansas and the Arkansas Code. The quorum court is the legislative branch of the county government and controls all spending and revenue collection. Representatives are called justices of the peace and are elected from county districts every even-numbered year. The number of districts in a county vary from nine to fifteen, and district boundaries are drawn by the county election commission. The Jefferson County Quorum Court has thirteen members. Presiding over quorum court meetings is the county judge, who serves as the chief operating officer of the county. The county judge is elected at-large and does not vote in quorum court business, although capable of vetoing quorum court decisions.

Jefferson County, Arkansas Elected countywide officials
Position	Officeholder	Party
County Judge	Gerald Robinson	Democratic
County Clerk	Shawndra Taggart	Democratic
Circuit Clerk	Flora Cook Bishop	Democratic
Sheriff	Lafayette Woods Jr.	Democratic
Treasurer	Vonysha Goodwin	Democratic
Collector	Tony Washington	Democratic
Assessor	Gloria Tillman	Democratic
Coroner	Chad Kelley	Democratic

The composition of the Quorum Court following the 2024 elections is 9 Democrats and 4 Republicans. Justices of the Peace (members) of the Quorum Court following the elections are:

- District 1: Rev. Alfred Carroll Sr. (D) of Pine Bluff
- District 2: Reginald Adams (D) of Pine Bluff
- District 3: Reginald Johnson (D)
- District 4: Patricia Royal Johnson (D) of Pine Bluff
- District 5: Jimmy Fisher Sr. (D)
- District 6: Margerette Williams (D) of Pine Bluff
- District 7: Melanie Johnson Dumas (D) of Pine Bluff
- District 8: Roy Agee (R)
- District 9: Cedric Jackson (D) of Pine Bluff
- District 10: Dr. Conley F. Byrd Jr. (R) of Redfield
- District 11: Danny Holcomb (R) of Pine Bluff
- District 12: Ted Harden (R) of White Hall
- District 13: Brenda Bishop Gaddy (D) of Altheimer

Additionally, the townships of Jefferson County are entitled to elect their own respective constables, as set forth by the Constitution of Arkansas. Constables are largely of historical significance as they were used to keep the peace in rural areas when travel was more difficult. The township constables as of the 2024 elections are:

- Barraque: Richard Debill (R)
- Jefferson: Scott A. Dunn (R)
- Melton: Turner Nowlin (R)
- Spring: Clyde McDaniel (R)
- Talladega: Michale Slayton (R)
- Vaugine: Deshawn Bennett (D)
- Washington: Otho Anderson III (R)

=== Infrastructure ===
The state has built a number of correctional facilities in and near Pine Bluff, and moved the headquarters of the Arkansas Department of Corrections (ADC) to here in 1979. The administrative Annex East is on Harding Avenue in Pine Bluff, south of city hall. The Diagnostic Unit, the Pine Bluff Unit, and the Randall L. Williams Correctional Facility are in the "Pine Bluff Complex" in Pine Bluff. The headquarters of the Arkansas Correctional School system are within the Pine Bluff Complex.

The Arkansas Department of Community Correction Southeast Arkansas Community Corrections Center is in Pine Bluff. The Maximum Security Unit is 25 miles (40 km) north of central Pine Bluff and off Arkansas Highway 15 in unincorporated Jefferson County. The Tucker Unit is also located north of Pine Bluff. Historically the Arkansas Boys' Industrial School and the Arkansas Negro Boys' Industrial School were in the county.

=== Politics ===
Jefferson County is strongly Democratic in races for president, governor, and the United States Senate. In the Reconstruction Era, the county's majority black residents favored presidential candidates from the Republican Party in every election from 1868 to 1888. In the early 1890s, white Southern Democrats passed laws to disenfranchise black voters from engaging in the political process, a process which ended by the 1960s, and blacks began to favor voting for Democrats and southern whites favored the Republicans. Since 1892, Democrats have carried the county in all but three presidential elections, when Republican William McKinley won it in 1900, American Independent Party candidate George Wallace won it in 1968 and Republican Richard Nixon won it in 1972, the latter whom carried every county in Arkansas. No Republican since George H. W. Bush in 1988 has won over 40% of the county's vote, although Joe Biden is the first Democrat since that year to get under 60% in the county.

In the style of many urban counties in the Barack Obama and post-Obama eras, the Democratic Party continues to enjoy a strong following in Jefferson County, even as the non-urban areas have deeply turned against the party.

United States presidential election results for Jefferson County, Arkansas
Year	Republican		Democratic		Third party(ies)	
Year	No.	%	No.	%	No.	%
1896	1,050	38.18%	1,653	60.11%	47	1.71%
1900	1,477	51.93%	1,363	47.93%	4	0.14%
1904	1,324	44.99%	1,520	51.65%	99	3.36%
1908	1,386	44.35%	1,585	50.72%	154	4.93%
1912	579	18.46%	1,659	52.88%	899	28.66%
1916	923	29.81%	2,173	70.19%	0	0.00%
1920	1,048	27.70%	2,670	70.58%	65	1.72%
1924	707	22.29%	1,950	61.48%	515	16.24%
1928	1,830	41.12%	2,611	58.67%	9	0.20%
1932	419	14.01%	2,548	85.22%	23	0.77%
1936	224	6.15%	3,414	93.66%	7	0.19%
1940	587	13.25%	3,829	86.45%	13	0.29%
1944	1,578	27.80%	4,095	72.15%	3	0.05%
1948	1,176	14.32%	5,086	61.92%	1,952	23.76%
1952	5,925	41.57%	8,300	58.24%	27	0.19%
1956	5,743	45.73%	6,426	51.17%	389	3.10%
1960	4,839	31.76%	8,442	55.41%	1,954	12.83%
1964	9,968	43.40%	12,872	56.04%	129	0.56%
1968	4,860	20.22%	9,125	37.96%	10,053	41.82%
1972	16,888	61.95%	10,346	37.95%	26	0.10%
1976	8,034	27.67%	21,001	72.33%	0	0.00%
1980	10,697	35.60%	17,292	57.55%	2,057	6.85%
1984	14,514	44.10%	18,082	54.95%	313	0.95%
1988	12,520	42.08%	16,664	56.01%	568	1.91%
1992	7,525	23.74%	21,819	68.85%	2,348	7.41%
1996	6,330	22.87%	19,701	71.18%	1,646	5.95%
2000	8,765	32.22%	17,716	65.13%	720	2.65%
2004	10,218	33.51%	19,675	64.52%	600	1.97%
2008	10,655	35.89%	18,465	62.19%	569	1.92%
2012	9,520	34.77%	17,470	63.80%	393	1.44%
2016	9,250	35.72%	15,772	60.91%	872	3.37%
2020	9,521	37.84%	14,981	59.55%	656	2.61%
2024	8,468	39.19%	12,802	59.25%	338	1.56%

== Education ==
School districts serving sections of the county include:

- Pine Bluff School District
- Watson Chapel School District
- White Hall School District
- DeWitt School District (headquartered in another county)

On July 1, 1983, the Plum Bayou School District consolidated into the Wabbaseka Tucker School District. On July 1, 1984, the Linwood School District consolidated into the Pine Bluff school district. The Altheimer-Sherrill School District and Wabbaseka Tucker school districts operated in Jefferson County until September 1, 1993, when they consolidated into the Altheimer Unified School District. On July 1, 2004, the Humphrey School District consolidated into the DeWitt district. Altheimer Unified consolidated into the Dollarway School District on July 10, 2006. Dollarway School District merged into the Pine Bluff district in 2021.

== Populated places ==
=== Cities ===
- Altheimer
- Humphrey (mostly in Arkansas County)
- Pine Bluff (county seat)
- Redfield
- White Hall

=== Towns ===
- Sherrill
- Wabbaseka

=== Census-designated places ===
- Sulphur Springs
- Tucker

=== Other communities ===
- Jefferson
- Lake Dick
- Midway
- Moscow
- New Gascony
- Noble Lake
- Reydell
- Sweden
- Wright

=== Townships ===
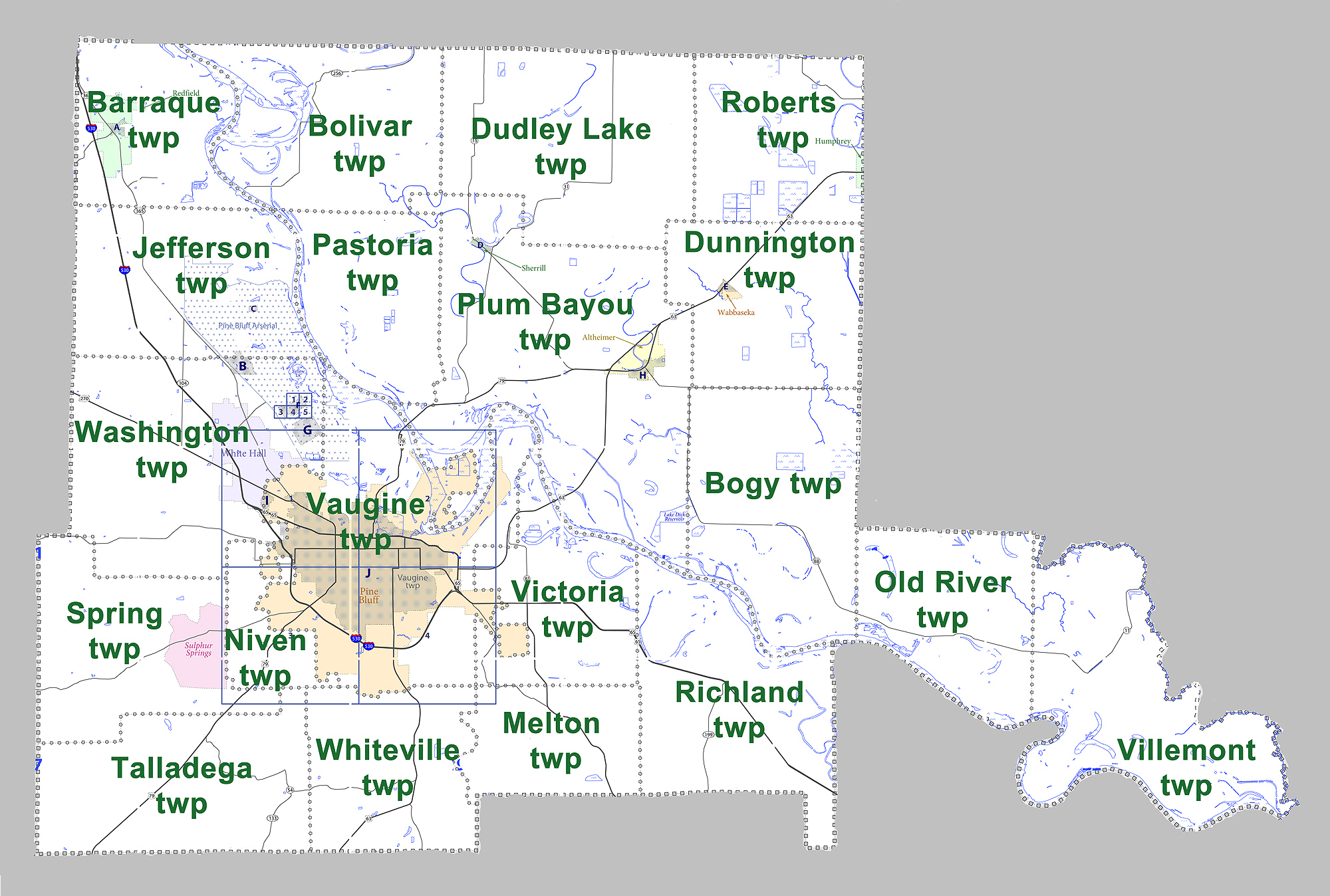
Townships in Jefferson County, Arkansas as of 2010

Townships in Arkansas are the divisions of a county. Each township includes unincorporated areas; some may have incorporated cities or towns within part of their boundaries. Arkansas townships have limited purposes in modern times. However, the United States census does list Arkansas population based on townships (sometimes referred to as "county subdivisions" or "minor civil divisions"). Townships are also of value for historical purposes in terms of genealogical research. Each town or city is within one or more townships in an Arkansas county based on census maps and publications. The townships of Jefferson County are listed below; listed in parentheses are the cities, towns, and/or census-designated places that are fully or partially inside the township.

- Barraque (Redfield)
- Bogy
- Bolivar
- Dudley Lake
- Dunnington (Wabbaseka)
- Jefferson
- Melton
- Niven
- Old River
- Pastoria
- Plum Bayou (Altheimer, Sherrill)
- Richland
- Roberts (Humphrey)
- Spring
- Talladega
- Vaugine (Pine Bluff)
- Victoria
- Villemont
- Washington (White Hall)
- Whiteville

=== Former populated places ===
- Anrep
- Bruce
- Byrd's Spring
- Clements
- College Park
- Diantha
- Dolton
- Doylestown
- Fairfield
- Faith
- Kratnek
- Lamb
- Lamberts
- Linn
- Noble's Lake
- Plum Bayou
- Ray Station
- Red Bluff
- Samples
- Secrest
- Sleeth
- Walden
- Waldstein

== Notable people ==
- Antoine Barraqué (1773–1858), founder of New Gascony, Arkansas
- Bobby Hutton (1950–1968), American activist
- Bobby King (1941–1983), American blues musician
- Elizabeth Rice (born 1985), American actress
- Kemp Toney (1876–1955), Arkansas politician

== See also ==
- List of memorials to Thomas Jefferson
- National Register of Historic Places listings in Jefferson County, Arkansas
