= Arkansas Highway 291 =

State highway in Arkansas, United States

Highway 291
- AR 291 highlighted in red

Route information
- Maintained by ArDOT
- Length: 15.462 mi (24.884 km)
- Existed: April 24, 1963–present

Major junctions
- South end: AR 46 at Dogwood
- US 270 in Prattsville
- North end: AR 190 in Tull

Location
- Country: United States
- State: Arkansas
- Counties: Grant

Highway system
- Arkansas Highway System; Interstate; US; State; Business; Spurs; Suffixed; Scenic; Heritage
← AR 290	→ AR 292

Highway 291 (AR 291, Ark. 291, and Hwy. 291) is a north–south state highway in Grant County, Arkansas. The highway connects minor population centers in western Grant County. Established in 1963, the state highway designation was extended to Traskwood from 1965 to 1995, when it was truncated at Tull, forming the current alignment. The highway is maintained by the Arkansas Department of Transportation (ArDOT).

== Route description ==
ArDOT maintains AR 291 as part of the state highway system. ArDOT estimates the traffic level for a segment of roadway was highest at the brief overlap with US 270, estimated at 4,600 vehicles per day in 2020, on average. Traffic drops significantly on either side of Prattsville, estimated at 1,000 VPD north of town and below 500 VPD south of it. For reference, roads under 400 VPD are classified as "very low volume local road" by the American Association of State Highway and Transportation Officials (AASHTO).

No segment of AR 291 is part of the National Highway System (NHS), a network of roads important to the nation's economy, defense, and mobility.

Highway 291 serves western Grant County, which is within the Piney Woods ecoregion, known for flat, rolling plains and oak-hickory-pine forest. The highway roughly parallels the Saline River, traveling between 2–4 miles (3.2–6.4 km) east of the river along the entire designation.

The route begins at a junction with Highway 46 at the unincorporated community of Dogwood near Jenkins' Ferry State Park and runs north through a sparsely populated, forested area. The highway intersects Highway 190 and turns left to continue north to the small town of Prattsville. In Prattsville, Highway 291 has a brief concurrency with US 270. The highway continues north, becoming more rural as it travels, before entering the small town of Tull. The Highway 291 designation ends at Oak Street, with the roadway becoming Highway 190 and continuing toward Benton.

== History ==
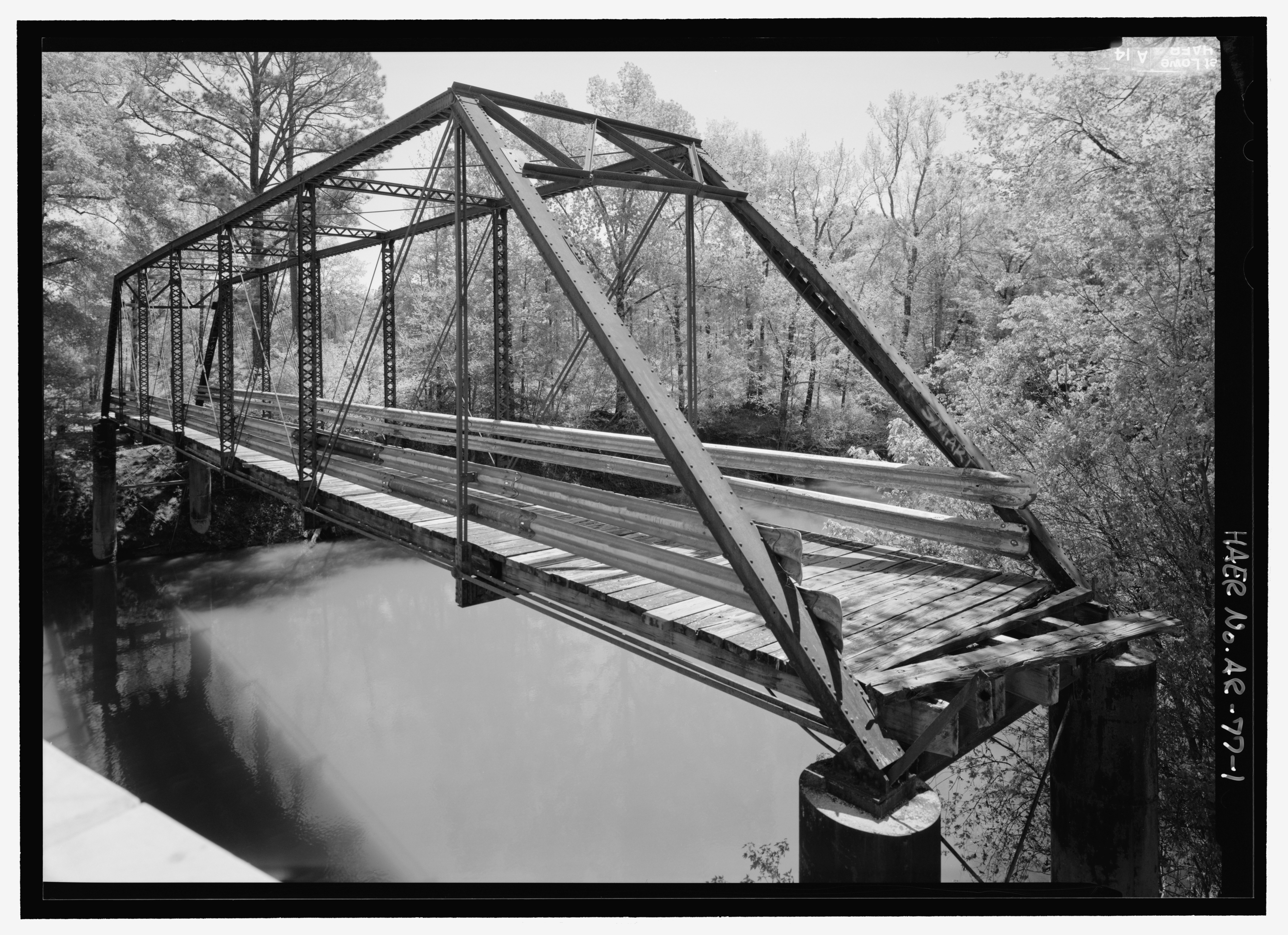
Former Highway 291 bridge over the Saline River between Tull and Traskwood

The Arkansas State Highway Commission created Highway 291 on April 24, 1963, as part of a large addition of mileage from each county to the state highway system. The designation was created from Highway 46 to the north side of Prattsville. The highway was extended to Highway 229 at Traskwood, including a bridge over the Saline River, on October 27, 1965. On August 30, 1995, the designation between Tull and Traskwood was deleted in exchange for an extension of Highway 229 at the request of the Saline and Grant County judges.

== Major intersections ==
The entire route is in Grant County.

Location	mi	km	Destinations	Notes
Dogwood	0.000	0.000	AR 46 – Sheridan, Leola	Southern terminus
	4.78	7.69	AR 190	
Prattsville	6.18	9.95	US 270 – Malvern, Sheridan	
Tull	15.462	24.884	AR 190 east (Main Street)	Continuation east
1.000 mi = 1.609 km; 1.000 km = 0.621 mi: Concurrency terminus

== See also ==
- List of bridges documented by the Historic American Engineering Record in Arkansas, includes a historic bridge over the Saline River between Tull and Traskwood
