= U.S. Route 270 =

Highway in the United States

U.S. Route 270
- US-270 highlighted in red

Route information
- Auxiliary route of US 70
- Length: 643 mi (1,035 km)
- Existed: 1930–present

Major junctions
- West end: US-54 / US-83 in Liberal, KS
- US 412 in Woodward, OK; US 60 in Seiling, OK; I-40 from Canadian, OK to Clarks Heights, OK; I-344 / Kilpatrick Turnpike in Oklahoma City; I-44 in Oklahoma City, OK; I-35 / US 62 / US 77 in Oklahoma City, OK; I-335 / Kickapoo Turnpike in Oklahoma City, OK; US 69 in McAlester, OK; US 70 in Hot Springs, AR; I-30 in Rockport, AR
- East end: I-530 / US 65 at White Hall, AR

Location
- Country: United States
- States: Kansas, Oklahoma, Arkansas

Highway system
- United States Numbered Highway System; List; Special; Divided

U.S. Route 270 (US 270) is a spur of US 70. It travels for 643 miles (1,035 km) from Liberal, Kansas at US 54 and US 83 to White Hall, Arkansas at Interstate 530 (I-530) and US 65. It travels through the states of Arkansas, Oklahoma, and Kansas. It travels through the cities of Oklahoma City, Oklahoma, Hot Springs, Arkansas, and McAlester, Oklahoma.

== Route description ==
=== Kansas ===
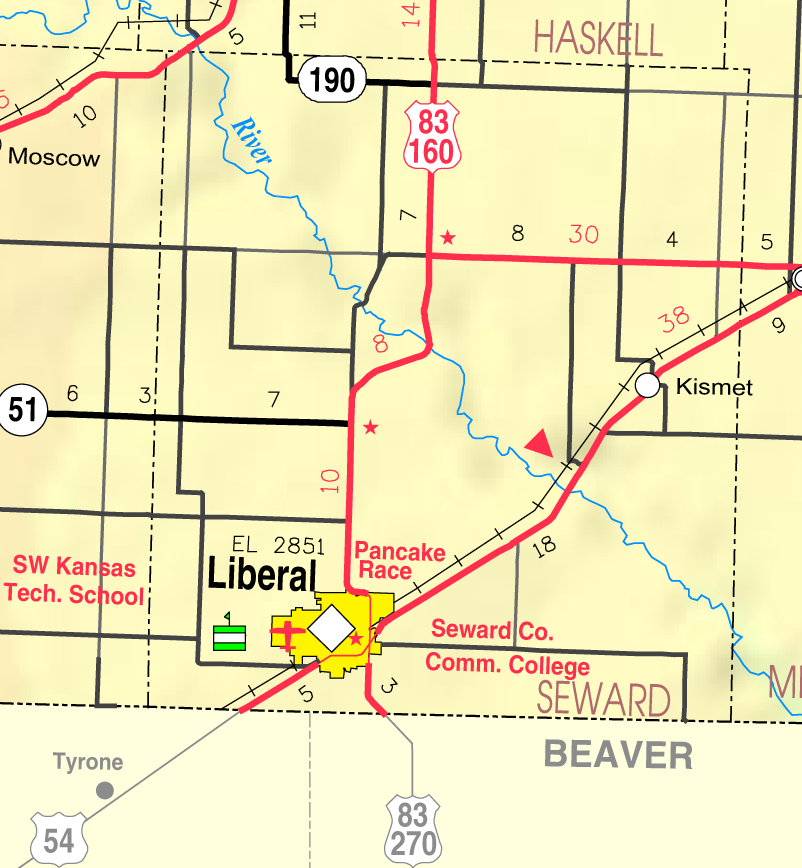
US 270 begins in Liberal, Kan., and leaves the state three miles south of there.

US 270 begins in the southeast part of Liberal, Kansas, at an intersection with US 83 (running north–south through the intersection) and US 54. US 270 follows the south leg of this intersection, following US 83 south. US 270 only spends 3 miles (4.8 km) in Kansas before crossing into Oklahoma. Seward County is the only Kansas county that US-270 serves.

=== Oklahoma ===
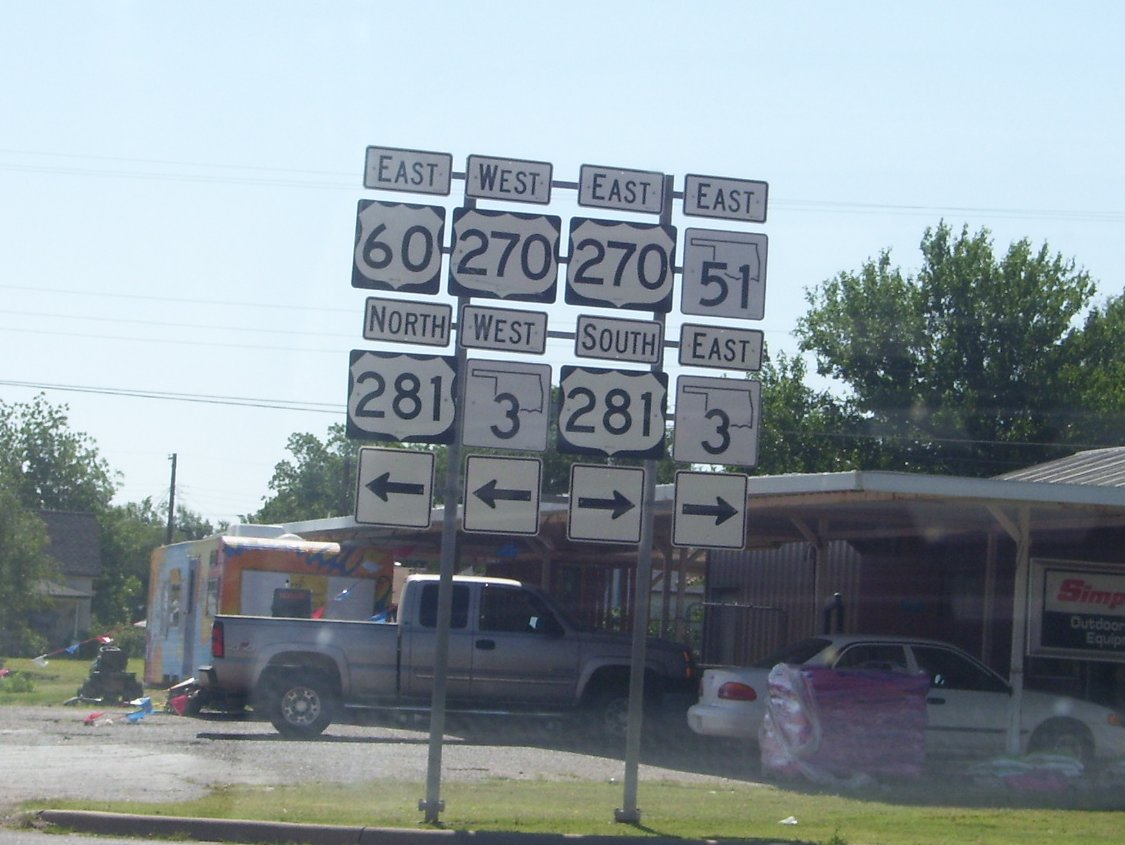
US 270 runs concurrently with many highways in northwestern Oklahoma.

US 270 enters Oklahoma in Beaver County, the eastern third of the Oklahoma Panhandle. From here it continues east along US 64, then south towards Beaver, the county seat, along SH-23. South of Beaver, the road joins with US 412 (OK) and SH-3, the latter of which US 270 will overlap with through most of northwest Oklahoma. After leaving the Panhandle and picking up US 183 near Fort Supply, the highways turn southwest towards Woodward. US 412 splits away in Woodward. US 270, concurrent with US 183 and SH-3, proceed southeast toward Seiling. West of Seiling, US 183 splits off to the south, but in Seiling, it is replaced by US 281. The routes continue southwest to Watonga, where US 270/281 turn south along SH-8, while SH-3 continues due east to concur with SH-33. In Geary, US 270 splits off on an independent alignment, looping through Calumet before joining with Interstate 40.

US 270 remains concurrent with I-40 from Exit 115 through Exit 181, a distance of 66 miles (106 km). US 270, attached to I-40, runs through the core of the Oklahoma City Metro area, passing through the western suburbs of El Reno and Yukon into Oklahoma City proper. The partnership runs just south of Downtown and the Bricktown entertainment district on the Crosstown Expressway. Major interchanges with I-44 and I-35 (the latter involving a concurrency with the interstate and its accompanying US Highway, US 62) are found in the city. I-40/US 270 also serve two eastern suburbs of Oklahoma City, Del City and Midwest City and form the northern boundary between Midwest City's civilian areas and Tinker Air Force Base. US-270 finally exits from I-40 on the west side of Shawnee.

US 270 serves most of the towns anchoring the area east of Oklahoma City, including Shawnee, Tecumseh, Seminole, Wewoka, and Holdenville. It continues southeast to the city of McAlester, a major southeastern Oklahoma city. It also serves many of the small towns east of McAlester, such as Krebs, Alderson, Bache, Haileyville, and Hartshorne.

After passing through Hartshorne, the roads curves to the northeast before turning onto a due east course taking it through Wilburton, Red Oak, and Wister. In Wister, it turns south, running across Wister Lake's dam, and proceeding southeast to Heavener. There, it meets US 59, which it will follow for the rest of its time in Oklahoma. The town highways head south from Heavener, passing through the Wister Wildlife Management Area before entering the Ouachita National Forest. The route serves as the northern terminus of US 259 near Page. The road then squeezes into a valley between Black Fork Mountain and Rich Mountain. In this valley, it crosses the state line into Arkansas.

=== Arkansas ===
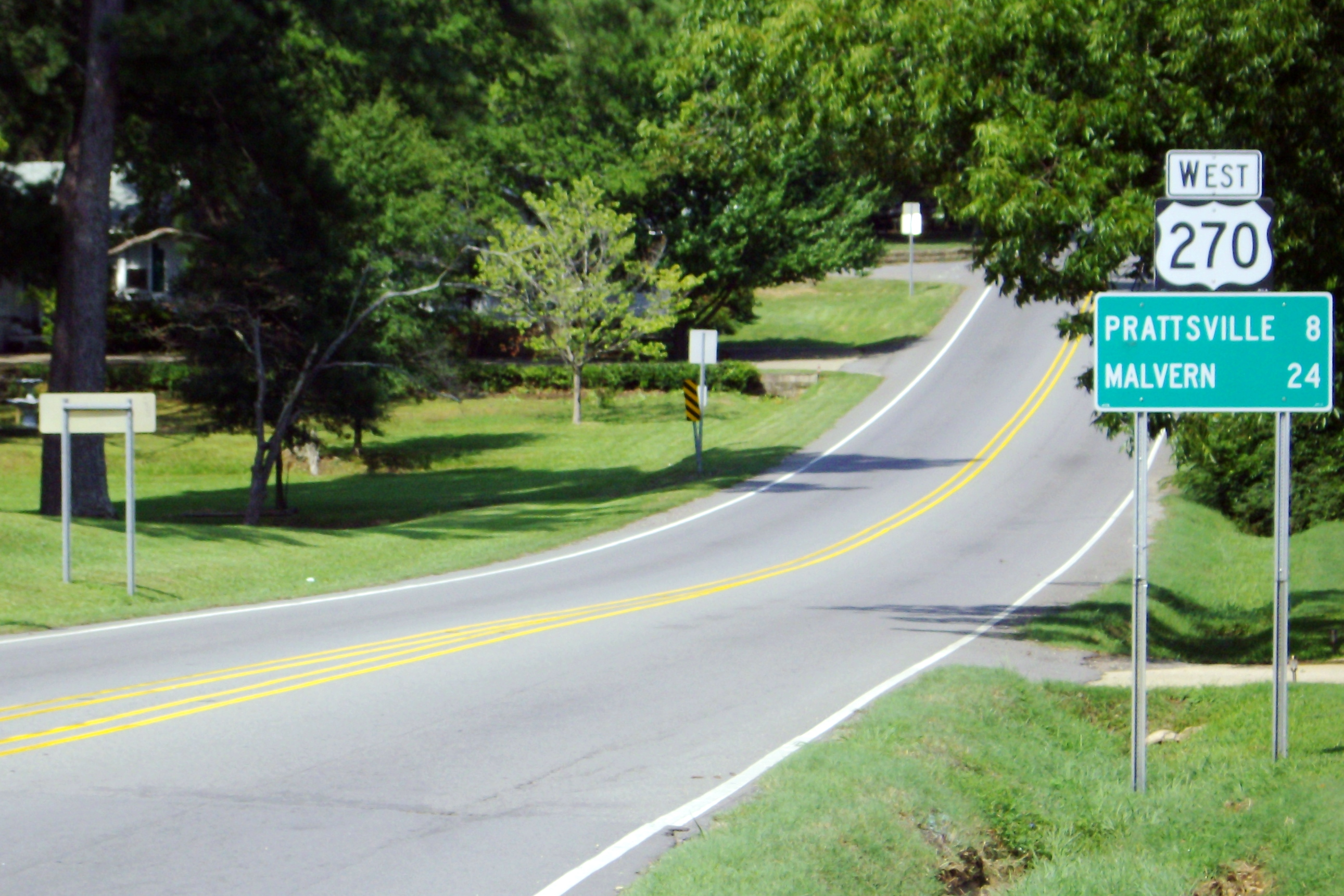
U.S. Route 270 in Sheridan, Arkansas.

US 270 enters Arkansas with US 59, and runs east to Acorn, where it meets US 71. The route then travels 15 miles north on US 71 to Y City where it splits off and continues east. The route then meets AR 88 in Pencil Bluff and AR 27 in Mt. Ida before heading to Hot Springs. Entering the city, US 270 meets US 70 southwest of town and runs concurrent with it around Hot Springs using the Dr. Martin Luther King Jr. Expressway before leaving the freeway and running along Malvern Avenue southeast of the city. US 270 intersects with I-30 just outside Malvern, running a short distance northeast on the freeway before interchanging with the George Hopkins Loop bypass and running south around the city. After meeting with US 67 east of town, the alignment then turns east-southeast meeting AR 229 in Poyen and AR 190/AR 291 in Prattsville before crossing paths with US 167 in Sheridan. The route trails east towards Pine Bluff terminating at and interchanging with I-530/US 65 in White Hall.

Directly east of this interchange, the highway used to continue along Sheridan Road before terminating at AR 365/Dollarway Road in northwest Pine Bluff. This former section of the route is now signed AR 365 Spur.

== History ==
The route was extended into Arkansas in 1931, supplanting State Road 8 from Oklahoma to Acorn and State Road 6 between Y City and Hot Springs. The roadway was mostly gravel or graded earth, with some segments in the Ouachita Mountains still under construction upon designation. In 1935, the US 270 designation supplanted the remainder of State Road 6 between Hot Springs and US 65 west of Pine Bluff. By this time, the entire route was gravel surfaced.

Between February 1937 and January 1938, US-270 was extended into Kansas, and overlapped K-27 from Johnson north to US-50 in Syracuse, where it terminated. KDOT requested that US-270 be extended north along K-27 to I-70 south of Goodland. This request was denied by the American Association of State Highway Officials in an October 14, 1967 meeting. In a November 14, 1980 resolution, the American Association of State Highway and Transportation Officials approved a request by KDOT to truncate US-270 to its current terminus in Liberal. Then in a May 18, 1981 resolution, US-270 was truncated to Liberal and the designation was removed from K-27.

== Future ==
In Arkansas, it has been proposed that part of AR-51 will become part of US-270. On I-30's current concurrency with US-270, going east, drivers can take exit 99 and make a right on US-270 East. If drivers make a left when they take exit 99, they must make a left to get on I-30 West/US-270 West because there is currently no outlet past that. That road has been proposed to be extended to AR-51. This will form the future northern terminus of AR-51. This means that drivers can make a left to get on AR-51 South and will have to make a right to get on US-270 West. Then, US-270 will meet the current US-270. Drivers can make a left to get on the future US-270 Business East and must make a right to get on US-270 West, just like AR-51 did. From east to west, the future US-270 will go through the cities of Rockport, Butterfield, and Magnet Cove.

== Major intersections ==
State	County	Location	mi	km	Exit	Destinations	Notes
Kansas	Seward	Liberal	0.00	0.00		US-54 (Pancake Boulevard) / US-83 north (Country Estates Road) – Garden City, Guymon OK, Meade	Western end of US-83 concurrency; western terminus
Oklahoma	Beaver					US 64 west / US 83 south – Perryton, Guymon	Eastern end of US-83 concurrency; western end of US-64 concurrency
Oklahoma	Beaver					US 64 east / SH-23 north – Buffalo	Eastern end of US-64 concurrency; western end of SH-23 concurrency
Oklahoma	Beaver	Elmwood				US 412 west / SH-3 west / SH-23 south – Booker Tx., Guymon	Eastern end of SH-23 concurrency; western end of US-412/SH-3 concurrency
Oklahoma	Harper	Log Cabin Corner				US 283 – Laverne, Shattuck	
Oklahoma	Harper	May				SH-46 – Buffalo, Gage	
Oklahoma	Ellis	No major junctions					
Oklahoma	Woodward					US 183 north – Buffalo	Western end of US-183 concurrency
Oklahoma	Woodward	Woodward				SH-15 west (Oklahoma Avenue) – Shattuck	
Oklahoma	Woodward	Woodward				US 412 east (Oklahoma Avenue) / SH-34 north (9th Street) – Enid	Eastern end of US-412 concurrency; western end of SH-34 concurrency
Oklahoma	Woodward					SH-34 south – Elk City, Vici	Eastern end of SH-34 concurrency
Oklahoma	Woodward					SH-50 north – Mooreland	
Oklahoma	Woodward–Major county line					US 183 south – Taloga, Clinton	Eastern end of US-183 concurrency
Oklahoma	Dewey	Seiling				US 60 east / US 281 north – Waynoka, Fairview	Western end of US-60/US-281 concurrency
Oklahoma	Dewey	Seiling				US 60 west / SH-51 west (Shepherd Street) to US 183 – Vici	Eastern end of US-60 concurrency; western end of SH-51 concurrency
Oklahoma	Dewey					SH-51 east – Canton, Southard	Eastern end of SH-51 concurrency
Oklahoma	Blaine					SH-33 west / SH-58 north – Canton, Thomas	Western end of SH-33 concurrency
Oklahoma	Blaine	Watonga				SH-3 east / SH-33 east / SH-8 north – Kingfisher, Okeene	Eastern end of SH-3/SH-33 concurrency; western end of SH-8 concurrency
Oklahoma	Blaine	Geary				US 281 south / SH-8 south to I-40 – Anadarko	Eastern end of US-281/SH-8 concurrency
Oklahoma	Canadian				Western end of freeway section		
Oklahoma	Canadian				115	I-40 west – Amarillo	Western end of I-40 concurrency
Oklahoma	see I-40						
Oklahoma	Pottawatomie	Clarks Heights			181	I-40 east / US 177 north / SH-3E east to SH-270 – Okemah, Stillwater, Fort Smith	Eastern end of I-40/SH-3 concurrency; western end of US-177/SH-3W concurrency
Oklahoma	Pottawatomie	Clarks Heights			Eastern end of freeway section		
Oklahoma	Pottawatomie	Shawnee				US 270 Bus. east (Kickapoo Spur)	Interchange
Oklahoma	Pottawatomie	Shawnee				US 270 Bus. west / SH-18 north (Farrall Avenue)	Interchange
Oklahoma	Pottawatomie	Tecumseh				Tecumseh (Broadway)	Interchange
Oklahoma	Pottawatomie	Tecumseh				US 177 south / SH-3W east / SH-9 west – Sulphur, Ada, Norman	Eastern end of US-177/SH-3W concurrency; western end of SH-9 concurrency; interchange
Oklahoma	Pottawatomie					SH-9A south – Harjo, Maud	Western end of SH-9A concurrency
Oklahoma	Pottawatomie	Earlsboro				SH-9A north – Earlsboro	Eastern end of SH-9A concurrency
Oklahoma	Seminole	Seminole				SH-3E west (Boren Boulevard) – Shawnee	Western end of SH-3E concurrency
Oklahoma	Seminole	Seminole				US 377 / SH-3E east / SH-99 (North Milt Phillips)	Eastern end of SH-3E concurrency
Oklahoma	Seminole	Seminole				SH-9 east – Eufaula	Eastern end of SH-9 concurrency; former northern terminus of SH-270A
Oklahoma	Seminole					US 270 Bus. east – Wewoka	
Oklahoma	Seminole					SH-59	Interchange
Oklahoma	Seminole	Wewoka				US 270 Bus. west / SH-56 – Wewoka, Ada	
Oklahoma	Hughes	Holdenville				US 270 Bus. east / SH-48 to SH-9 – Holdenville	
Oklahoma	Hughes					US 270 Bus. west – Holdenville	
Oklahoma	Hughes	Horntown				US 75 north – Lamar, Tulsa	Western end of US-75 concurrency
Oklahoma	Hughes					US 75 south / SH-1 west – Coalgate, Calvin, Ada	Eastern end of US-75 concurrency; western end of SH-1 concurrency; interchange
Oklahoma	Hughes					SH-31A south – Stuart	
Oklahoma	Pittsburg					Indian Nation Turnpike to US 69 – Henryetta, Tulsa, Paris	Indian Nation Turnpike exit 70
Oklahoma	Pittsburg	McAlester				SH-31 west (North West Street)	Western end of SH-31 concurrency
Oklahoma	Pittsburg	McAlester				US 69 Bus. (Main Street)	
Oklahoma	Pittsburg	McAlester				US 69 – Muskogee, Eufaula, Atoka, Durant	Interchange
Oklahoma	Pittsburg	Krebs				SH-31 east – Krebs	Eastern end of SH-31 concurrency; interchange
Oklahoma	Pittsburg	Haileyville				SH-63 west – Kiowa	Western end of SH-63 concurrency
Oklahoma	Pittsburg					SH-1 east / SH-63 east – Talihina	Eastern end of SH-1/SH-63 concurrency
Oklahoma	Latimer	Wilburton				SH-2 south – Clayton, Talihina	Western end of SH-2 concurrency
Oklahoma	Latimer	Wilburton				SH-2 north – Robbers Cave, Kinta	Eastern end of SH-2 concurrency
Oklahoma	Latimer	Red Oak				SH-82 south (Southeast 2nd Street) – Talihina	Western end of SH-82 concurrency
Oklahoma	Latimer					SH-82 north – Lequire, Stigler	Eastern end of SH-82 concurrency
Oklahoma	Le Flore	Fanshawe				US 271 south – Talimena Drive, Talihina	Western end of US-271 concurrency
Oklahoma	Le Flore	Wister				US 271 north – Poteau	Eastern end of US-271 concurrency
Oklahoma	Le Flore	Heavener				US 59 north – Poteau	western end of US-59 concurrency
Oklahoma	Le Flore	Heavener				SH-128 east – Waldron	
Oklahoma	Le Flore					US 259 south – Broken Bow	
Arkansas	Polk	Rich Mountain	6.88	11.07		AR 272 to AR 88 – Talimena Scenic Drive, Queen Wilhelmina State Park	
Arkansas	Polk	Acorn	15.656	25.196		US 59 south / US 71 south – Mena, Texarkana	Eastern end of US 59 concurrency; western end of US 71 concurrency
Arkansas	Scott	"Y" City	31.07	50.00		US 71 north	Eastern end of US 71 concurrency
Arkansas	Scott	"Y" City				I-49	Proposed
Arkansas	Montgomery	Pencil Bluff	53.45	86.02		AR 88 east – Sims	Western end of AR 88 concurrency
Arkansas	Montgomery	Pencil Bluff	53.79	86.57		AR 88 west – Oden, Pine Ridge, Mena, Queen Wilhelmina State Park	Eastern end of AR 88 concurrency
Arkansas	Montgomery		58.17	93.62		AR 298 north – Sims	
Arkansas	Montgomery		62.15	100.02		AR 27 north / AR 379 (Southfork Road) – Story	Western end of AR 27 concurrency
Arkansas	Montgomery	Mount Ida	63.70	102.52		AR 27 south – Glenwood	Eastern end of AR 27 concurrency
Arkansas	Montgomery		72.35	116.44		AR 949-2 (Ouachita Shores Parkway) – Denby Point Recreation Area	
Arkansas	Montgomery		73.56	118.38		AR 949-3 (Shangri-La Drive) – Tompkins Bend Recreation Area	
Arkansas	Montgomery	Joplin	74.57	120.01		AR 949-4 (Mount Harbor Road) – Joplin Recreation Area	
Arkansas	Garland		85.82	138.11		AR 227 south (Sunshine Road) – Sunshine	
Arkansas	Garland		86.03	138.45		AR 926 (Brady Mountain Road) – Brady Mountain Recreation Area	
Arkansas	Garland	Piney	94.69	152.39		AR 227 north – Mountain Pine, Lake Ouachita State Park	
Arkansas	Garland	Hot Springs	95.79	154.16	Western end of freeway section		
Arkansas	Garland	Hot Springs	95.79	154.16	1	US 270B east – Hot Springs	Western terminus of US 270B
Arkansas	Garland	Hot Springs	96.60	155.46	2	US 70 west / US 70B east (Airport Road) – Glenwood	Western end of US 70 concurrency; western terminus of US 70B
Arkansas	Garland	Hot Springs	98.46	158.46	3	McLeod Street	
Arkansas	Garland	Hot Springs	99.53	160.18	4	AR 88 (Higdon Ferry Road)	
Arkansas	Garland	Hot Springs	100.35	161.50	5	AR 7 (Central Avenue)	Signed as exits 5A (south) and 5B (north)
Arkansas	Garland	Hot Springs	102.61	165.13	7	AR 128 (Carpenter Dam Road)	
Arkansas	Garland	Hot Springs	104.57	168.29	9	US 70 east / US 270B west (Malvern Avenue) – Little Rock	Eastern end of US 70 concurrency; eastern terminus of US 270B
Arkansas	Garland	Hot Springs	104.57	168.29	Eastern end of freeway section		
Arkansas	Garland		108.17	174.08		AR 171 north	
Arkansas	Hot Spring	Magnet Cove	110.34	177.58		AR 51 south – Butterfield	
Arkansas	Hot Spring		116.73	187.86		AR 51 north – Butterfield	
Arkansas	Hot Spring	Rockport	117.76	189.52	Western end of freeway section		
Arkansas	Hot Spring	Rockport	117.76	189.52	98	I-30 west / US 270B east – Malvern, Texarkana, Dallas	Western end of I-30 concurrency; signed as exits 98B (west) and 98A (east)
Arkansas	Hot Spring	Rockport	119.26	191.93	99	I-30 east – Benton, Little Rock	Eastern end of I-30 concurrency
Arkansas	Hot Spring	Rockport	119.26	191.93	Eastern end of freeway section		
Arkansas	Hot Spring	Malvern				US 67 / US 270B west – Glen Rose, Perla, Malvern	
Arkansas	Grant	Poyen				AR 229 – Haskell, Leola	
Arkansas	Grant	Prattsville				AR 291 north	Western end of AR 291 concurrency
Arkansas	Grant	Prattsville				AR 291 south – Jenkins Ferry State Park	Eastern end of AR 291 concurrency
Arkansas	Grant	Prattsville				AR 190 east	
Arkansas	Grant	Sheridan				US 167 – Little Rock, El Dorado	
Arkansas	Grant	Sheridan				AR 46 west (Rose Street) – Jenkins Ferry State Park, Grant County Museum	
Arkansas	Grant	Sheridan				US 167B (Rock Street) to I-530 – Fordyce	
Arkansas	Grant	Sheridan				AR 46 east	
Arkansas	Jefferson					AR 104 east – Samples	
Arkansas	Jefferson	White Hall				I-530 (US 65) – Little Rock, Pine Bluff	I-530 exit 34
Arkansas	Jefferson	White Hall				AR 365S east (Sheridan Road) to US 65B – White Hall	Continuation east
1.000 mi = 1.609 km; 1.000 km = 0.621 mi: Concurrency terminus; Unopened

== Special routes ==
=== Hot Springs business route ===
U.S. Highway 270B
- Location: Hot Springs, Arkansas
- Length: 8.90 mi (14.32 km)
- Existed: June 5, 1991–present

U.S. Highway 270B is a 8.90-mile-long (14.32 km) business route in Garland County, Arkansas. It runs through downtown Hot Springs, Arkansas.

==== Major intersections ====
The entire route is in Hot Springs, Garland County.

mi	km	Destinations	Notes
0.000	0.000	US 270 (Albert Pike Road) – Mount Ida, Malvern, Little Rock	Western terminus; exit 1 on US 270
1.687	2.715	US 70B west (Airport Road) – Glenwood	Western end of US 70B concurrency
3.77	6.07	AR 7 (Central Avenue) – Business District	
4.25	6.84	US 70B east (East Grand Avenue)	Eastern end of US 70B concurrency
7.00	11.27	AR 128 west (Carpenter Dam Road)	Eastern terminus of AR 128
8.90	14.32	US 70 / US 270 (Malvern Avenue) – Glenwood, Mount Ida, Benton, Little Rock	Eastern terminus; exit 9 on US 70/US 270
1.000 mi = 1.609 km; 1.000 km = 0.621 mi: Concurrency terminus

=== Malvern business route ===
U.S. Highway 270B
- Location: Malvern, Arkansas
- Length: 2.628 mi (4.229 km)
- Existed: January 11, 2006–present

U.S. Highway 270B is a business route of US 270 in Malvern, Arkansas, the small-town county seat of Hot Spring County. Created in 2006 from a former alignment of the parent route, US 270B passes through downtown Malvern, before forming an overlap with US 67.

==== Major intersections ====
The entire route is in Malvern, Hot Spring County.

mi	km	Destinations	Notes
0.00	0.00	I-30 / US 270 – Texarkana, Hot Springs, Little Rock	Western terminus
2.63	4.23	US 67 south (Page Avenue) / AR 9 (Main Street)	Western end of US 67 concurrency
5.53	8.90	US 67 north / US 270 – Glen Rose, Sheridan	Eastern terminus; eastern end of US 67 concurrency
1.000 mi = 1.609 km; 1.000 km = 0.621 mi: Concurrency terminus

=== Other loops and spurs ===
- Seminole, Oklahoma; Short highway connecting U.S. 270 to OK-9. This highway is disputed as a state or U.S. highway, as both signs are posted.
- Magnet Cove, Arkansas (decommissioned)

Browse numbered routes
← K-269	KS	→ K-271
← SH-266	OK	→ SH-270
← AR 269	AR	→ US 271
