= Arkansas Highway 46 =

State highway in Arkansas, United States

Highway 46

Route information
- Maintained by ArDOT
- Length: 39.07 mi (62.88 km)
- Existed: 1926–present

Major junctions
- West end: AR 9 near Leola
- US 167 in Sheridan; US 270 in Sheridan; I-530 / US 65 near Redfield
- East end: White Bluff Road near Redfield

Location
- Country: United States
- State: Arkansas
- Counties: Dallas, Grant, Jefferson

Highway system
- Arkansas Highway System; Interstate; US; State; Business; Spurs; Suffixed; Scenic; Heritage
← AR 45	→ AR 47

Highway 46 (AR 46, Ark. 46, and Hwy. 46) is a state highway in South Arkansas. The route begins at AR 9 and runs east 39.07 miles (62.88 km) to White Bluff Road near Redfield. The highway was created during the 1926 Arkansas highway numbering and extended throughout the 1970s. The route is maintained by the Arkansas Department of Transportation (ArDOT). A portion of the route is designated as an Arkansas Heritage Trail for its use by both armies during the Camden Expedition of the Civil War.

== History ==
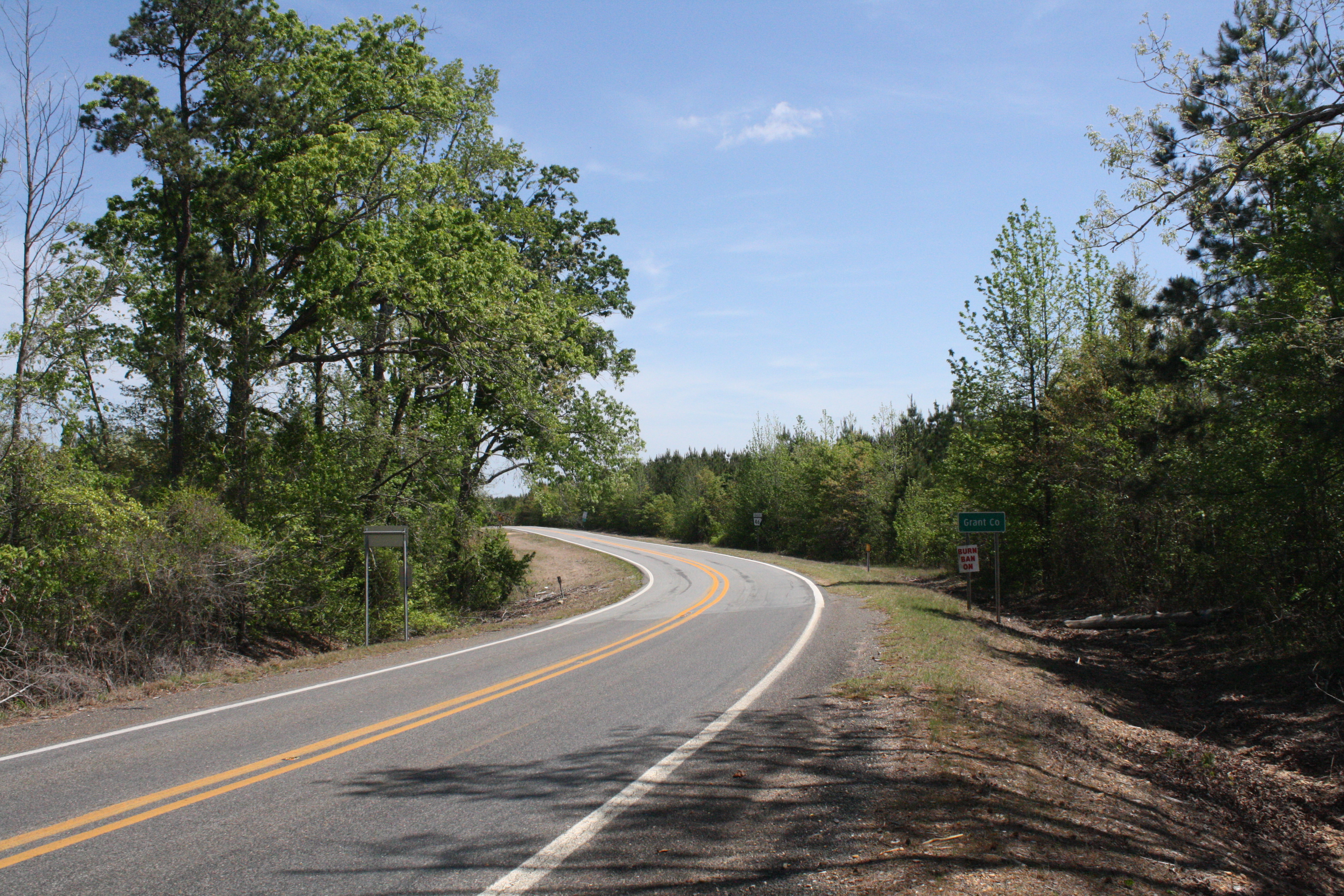
AR 46 enters Grant County

AR 46 was one of the original state highways, designated in 1926. State Road 46 ran from State Road 9 to US Highway 167 (US 167) in Sheridan (now [U.S. Route 167B).

The route was extended east to the Jefferson County line during a period of highway system expansion after Act 9 of 1973 was passed by the Arkansas General Assembly. The act directed county judges and legislators to designate up to 12 miles (19 km) of county roads as state highways in each county. The following year, the route was extended east to Redfield. The final extension came in 1976, adding 1.2 miles (1.9 km) to the Arkansas Power and Light Company's White Bluff Steam Electric Plant as an industrial access road.

The segment of AR 46 between AR 9 and Sheridan is an Arkansas Heritage Trail, used during the Camden Expedition of the Civil War by both armies. Union General Frederick Steele used the route to approach the Confederate States of America army in Camden. Confederate Major General Thomas J. Churchill, Mosby M. Parsons, John G. Walker and Jo Shelby's units also traveled between AR 9 and Leola to the Battle of Jenkins' Ferry, and at other points during the campaign.

== Major intersections ==
Mile markers reset at some concurrencies.

County	Location	mi	km	Destinations	Notes
Dallas		0.00	0.00	AR 9 – Malvern, Princeton	Western terminus
Grant	Leola	6.1– 6.7	9.8– 10.8	AR 229 (Ninth Avenue) – Carthage, Poyen	
Grant	Dogwood	12.3	19.8	AR 291 north – Prattsville	AR 291 southern terminus
Grant		15.8	25.4	AR 190 west – Prattsville	AR 190 eastern terminus
Grant	Sheridan	19.6	31.5	US 167 – Little Rock, El Dorado	
Grant	Sheridan	21.74– 0.00	34.99– 0.00	US 270 (Center Street) – Malvern, Pine Bluff	
Jefferson		15.3	24.6	I-530 / US 65 – Little Rock, Pine Bluff	Exit 20 (I-530)
Jefferson	Redfield	16.11– 0.00	25.93– 0.00	AR 365	Former US 65
Jefferson		1.22	1.96	End state maintenance at White Bluff Entergy Plant	Eastern terminus
1.000 mi = 1.609 km; 1.000 km = 0.621 mi: Concurrency terminus
