= Jenkins' Ferry Battleground State Park =

Battlefield in Arkansas, United States

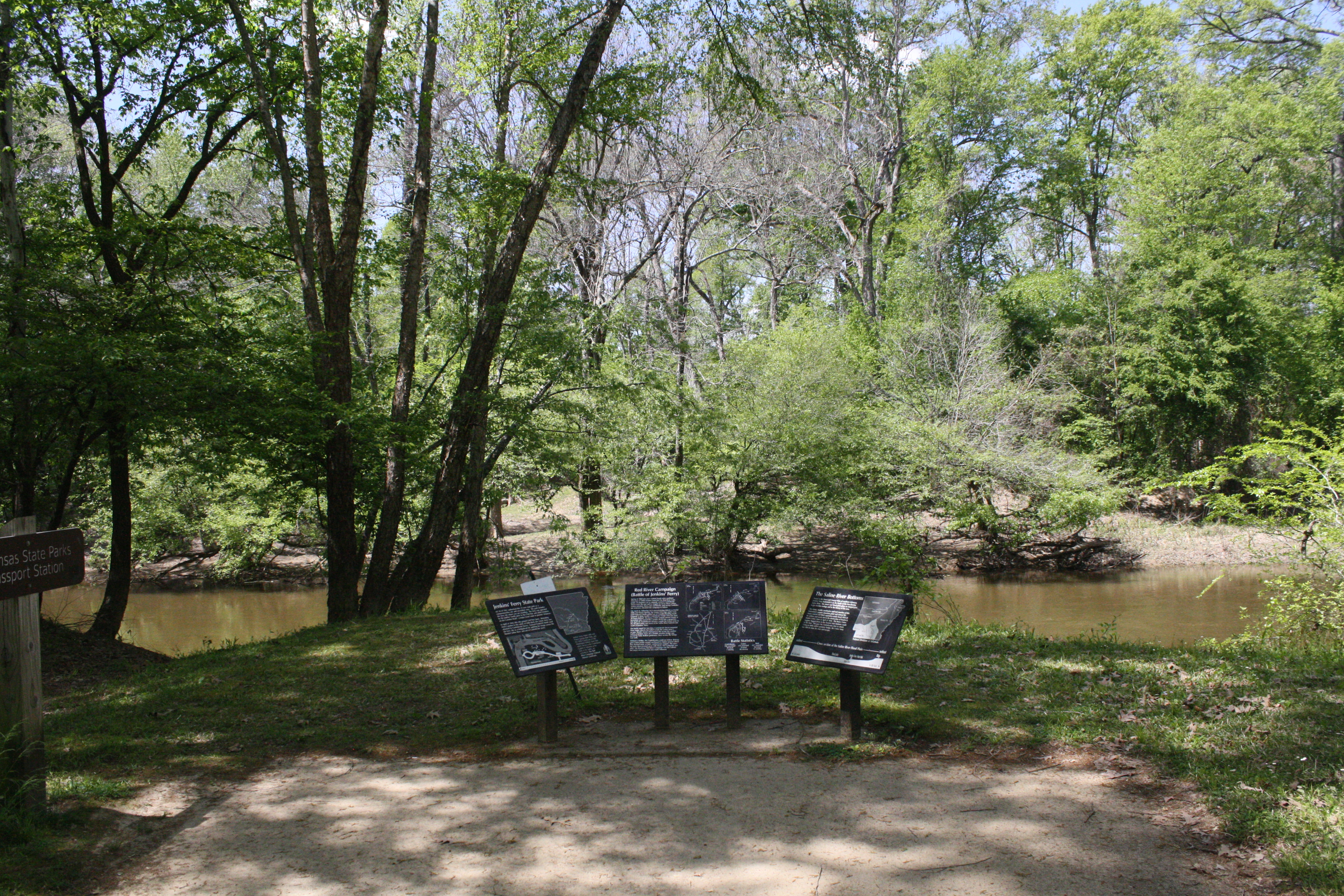
- Interpretative signage near the historic ferry crossing of the Saline River

- Location in Arkansas
- 34°12′47.4″N 92°32′50.6″W
- Location: Grant County, Arkansas
- Nearest city: Leola, Arkansas

History
- Established: Early 20th century
- Original use: Field, forest, battlefield

Site notes
- Elevation: 190 feet (58 m)
- Area: 40.15 acres (16.25 ha)
- Governing body: Arkansas Department of Parks, Heritage, and Tourism
- Website: Official website

U.S. National Register of Historic Places
- Official name: Jenkins' Ferry Battleground
- Designated: January 21, 1970
- Reference no.: 70000120

U.S. National Historic Landmark District – Contributing property
- Official name: Jenkins' Ferry Battlefield
- Designated: April 19, 1994
- Part of: Camden Expedition Sites National Historic Landmark
- Reference no.: 94001182

The Jenkins' Ferry Battleground State Park, also known as the Jenkins' Ferry Battlefield, is a battlefield in Grant County, Arkansas. The Arkansas state park commemorates the Battle of Jenkins' Ferry fought on Saturday, April 30, 1864, during the Red River campaign of the American Civil War.

First established as a masonic park in the early 20th century, the 40-acre historic site was donated to the state of Arkansas in 1961. The American Civil War battlefield was listed in the U.S. National Register of Historic Places as the Jenkins' Ferry Battleground in 1970 and is part of the Camden Expedition Sites National Historic Landmark, a U.S. National Historic Landmark District contributing property, in 1994.

== Description and administrative history ==
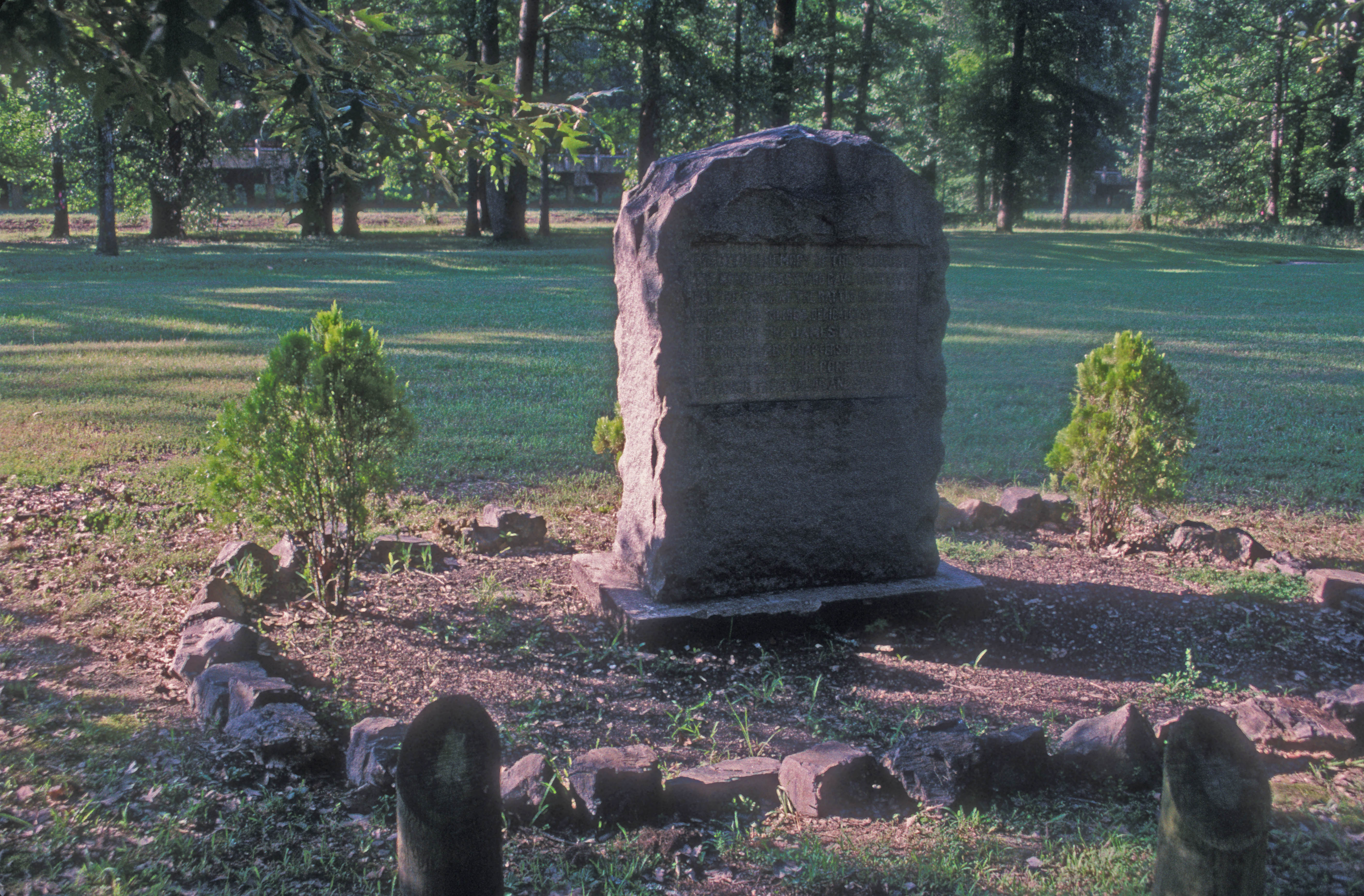
The Jenkins' Ferry Memorial commemorates the soldiers of the Confederacy killed at the Battle of Jenkins' Ferry on April 30, 1864.

The Jenkins' Ferry Battleground State Park, operated by the Division of State Parks of the Arkansas Department of Parks, Heritage, and Tourism, includes historic markers that describe the battle, as well as recreational opportunities on the Saline River, including swimming and boating. A pavilion and several picnic sites are also located in the state park, which is 12 miles (19 km) southwest of Sheridan, and 9 miles (14 km) northeast of Leola in Grant County on the west side of Highway 46.

The park is set in a bend of the Saline River, which generally flows northwest to southeast, meandering southwest at this point. It has picnic tables and fire pits, and a basic public toilet, as well as interpretive signs explaining the region's historical significance. It includes a portion of the antebellum Little Rock and Camden road and the eastern end of the old Jenkins' Ferry crossing.

Established as a masonic park in the early 20th century, Act 10 of 1961 of the State of Arkansas authorized transfer of the landscaped 40 acre tract commemorating the Battle of Jankins' Ferry to the Arkansas Publicity and Parks Commission. The law included an offer to donate the Jenkins' Ferry site made by the author of the bill. It was listed in the U.S. National Register of Historic Places as the Jenkins' Ferry Battleground on January 21, 1970, and a part of the Camden Expedition Sites National Historic Landmark, a U.S. National Historic Landmark District Contributing Property, on April 19, 1994.

== See also ==
- List of Arkansas state parks
- List of National Historic Landmarks in Arkansas
- National Register of Historic Places listings in Grant County, Arkansas
