= Interstate 530 =

Highway in Arkansas

Interstate 530
- I-530 highlighted in red, AR 530 in blue; future section in pink

Route information
- Auxiliary route of I-30
- Maintained by ArDOT
- Length: 46.65 mi (75.08 km)
- Existed: August 2, 1999–present
- NHS: Entire route

Major junctions
- South end: US 63 / US 79 / US 65B / US 65 / US 425 / AR 190 in Pine Bluff
- US 270 / AR 365S in White Hall; US 167 near East End
- North end: I-30 / US 65 / US 67 / US 167 / I-440 in Little Rock

Location
- Country: United States
- State: Arkansas
- Counties: Jefferson, Grant, Saline, Pulaski

Highway system
- Interstate Highway System; Main; Auxiliary; Suffixed; Business; Future; Arkansas Highway System; Interstate; US; State; Business; Spurs; Suffixed; Scenic; Heritage
← AR 463	I-530; AR 530	→ I-540

Interstate 530 (I-530) in Arkansas is a spur route of the Interstate highway system, traveling 46.65 miles (75.08 km) from Pine Bluff north-northwest to Little Rock at an interchange of I-30 and I-440. The highway, which is also completely concurrent with US 65 for its entire length, also travels through the cities of Redfield and White Hall. In the future, I-530 will be extended south to I-69 west of Monticello. A short section near the future I-69 alignment has been signed as Highway 530.

== Route description ==
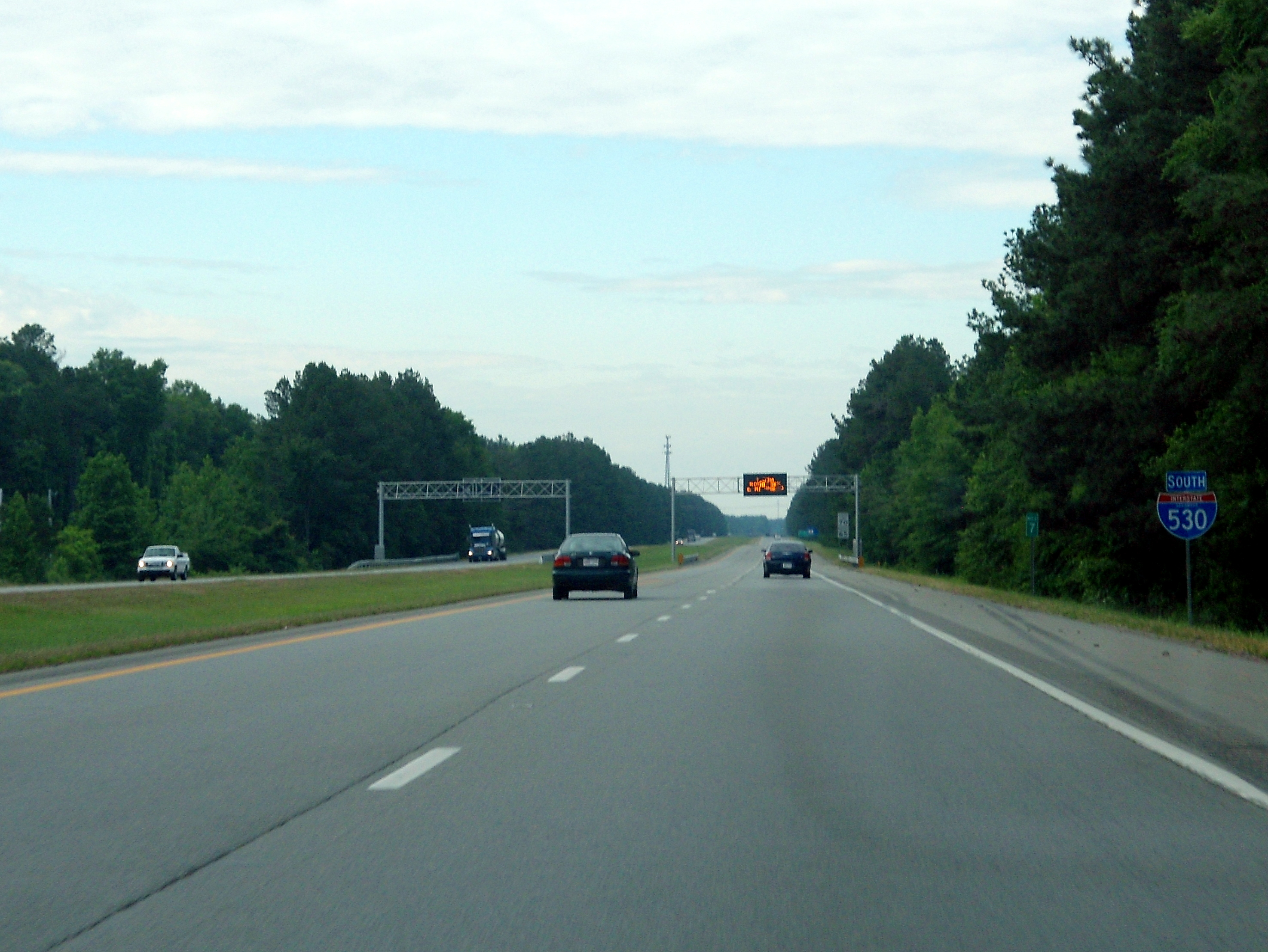
I-530/US 167 in Pulaski County

The route begins at a high volume interchange with I-30/I-440/US 65/US 67/US 167 in southeast Little Rock. This intersection handles over 100,000 vehicles per day on average. I-530 runs south with US 65 and US 167 through marshland, entering Saline County briefly to split with US 167 south (exit 10). At exit 10, the junction can only accessed by southbound I-530. Northbound I-530 must take exit 9 then come back southbound to access exit 10. After returning to Pulaski County, I-530 has an exit at Hensley with Hensley Road (exit 15, which also connects to AR 365) before entering Jefferson County.

I-530 continues south, passing through forested land and clear cut areas, also running parallel to AR 365. I-530 intersects AR 46 (exit 20) in Redfield before entering White Hall. After an intersection with AR 256 (Holland Avenue, exit 32), the route runs south to serve as the eastern terminus for US 270 at exit 34. This exit also contains Highway 365 Spur (AR 365 Spur) eastbound to White Hall and Sheridan Street. Continuing south to Pine Bluff, I-530 serves as a beltway around the city. I-530 skirts the city to the southwest, including exits for AR 190 (West 19th Street, exit 37), US 79/U.S. Highway 79 Business (US 79B, South Camden Road, exit 39), and US 63/AR 463 (South Olive Street, exit 43).

The Interstate ends at a very large junction with US 63/US 65/US 65B/US 79/US 425/AR 190, after which the roadway continues south as US 65/US 425 toward Dumas.

This Interstate Highway is unusual in that its exit number increase south rather than north. However, the standard for spurs is to increase from the beginning at the parent.

=== I-530 State Scenic Byway ===
I-530 is designated as one of ten Arkansas Scenic Byways for 15 miles (24 km) from AR 256 northwest of White Hall to US 65 in southern Pine Bluff. The route passes over Bayou Bartholomew and the Mississippi Alluvial Plain. The southern portion was formerly a wetland preserve, but now the land is being developed.

==== Points of interest ====
- Arkansas Entertainers Hall of Fame
- Arkansas Railroad Museum
- Pine Bluff Commercial Historic District

== History ==
The current route was formerly designated as US 65. Today, I-530 and US 65 run concurrently as a four-lane freeway spur. The route formally gained the I-530 designation after a full Interstate-grade bypass of Pine Bluff (known locally as the Wiley Branton Highway) replaced an expressway section of US 65 through Pine Bluff that contains at-grade intersections. This segment (known locally as the Martha Mitchell Expressway) was redesignated US 65B; US 65 was rerouted to the bypass before gaining the I-530 codesignation.

== Exit list ==
County	Location	mi	km	Exit	Destinations	Notes
Jefferson	Pine Bluff	46.63	75.04		US 65 south (US 425 south) – Dumas, McGehee, Lake Village	Continuation south; southern end of US 65 concurrency
Jefferson	Pine Bluff	46.63– 46.32	75.04– 74.54	46	US 63 north / US 79 north / US 65B north / AR 190 west (Harding Avenue) – Downtown Pine Bluff	Southern end of US 63/US 79 concurrency; signed for Harding Avenue southbound, Downtown northbound
Jefferson		44.03– 43.87	70.86– 70.60	44	AR 530 south – Star City, Monticello	Future I-530 south
Jefferson	Pine Bluff	42.99	69.19	43	US 63 south / AR 463 north – Warren, El Dorado	Northern end of US 63 concurrency; southern terminus of AR 463
Jefferson	Pine Bluff	41.97	67.54	42	Hazel Street	
Jefferson	Pine Bluff	40.85	65.74	41	Old Warren Road	
Jefferson	Pine Bluff	39.46	63.50	39	US 79 south / US 79B north – Rison, Fordyce, Camden	Northern end of US 79 concurrency; southern terminus of US 79B
Jefferson		37.53	60.40	37	AR 190 (West 13th Street)	
Jefferson		36.57	58.85	36	Princeton Pike	
Jefferson	White Hall	35.33– 35.14	56.86– 56.55	35	US 65B south – Pine Bluff	Northern terminus of US 65B
Jefferson	White Hall	33.67	54.19	34	US 270 west / AR 365S east – White Hall, Sheridan	Eastern terminus of US 270; western terminus of AR 365S
Jefferson	White Hall	31.74	51.08	32	AR 256 east – White Hall, Pine Bluff Arsenal	Western terminus of AR 256
Jefferson		29.78	47.93	30	AR 104	
Jefferson		26.53	42.70	27	CR 4 (Gravel Pit Road)	
Jefferson		23.69	38.13	24	Jefferson, National Center for Toxicological Research	Access via Stagecoach Road
Jefferson		19.94	32.09	20	AR 46 – Redfield	
Pulaski		14.96	24.08	15	Hensley	Access via Hensley Road
Saline		11.63	18.72	12	Woodson	Access via Woodson Lateral Road
Saline		9.96	16.03	10	US 167 south – Sheridan, Fordyce, El Dorado	Southern end of US 167 concurrency; no northbound exit
Pulaski		8.77	14.11	9	Bingham Road	
Pulaski		6.57	10.57	7	145th Street / Pratt Road	
Pulaski		2.71	4.36	3	AR 338 (Dixon Road)	
Pulaski	Little Rock			1	I-30 west (US 67 south) / I-440 east – Memphis, St. Louis, Airport, Texarkana	Northbound exit and southbound entrance; signed as exits 1B (west) and 1A (east); exit 138A on I-30; western terminus of I-440
Pulaski	Little Rock	0.00	0.00		I-30 east / US 65 north / US 167 north (US 67 north) – Downtown Little Rock	Northern terminus; northern end of US 65/US 167 concurrency
1.000 mi = 1.609 km; 1.000 km = 0.621 mi: Concurrency terminus; Incomplete access

== Arkansas Highway 530 ==
Highway 530
- Future I-530; SIU 28 of Interstate 69
- Location: Pine Bluff–Monticello
- Existed: October 22, 1986–present

A planned extension of the route pushes the Interstate south to US 278 in Wilmar. The first segment of the extension from US 278 north to Highway 35 opened as a two-lane expressway designated Arkansas Highway 530 (AR 530) on June 6, 2006. This extension is intended to connect to the proposed southern extension of I-69; US 278 at Wilmar also provides four-lane access to the future I-530 from the larger cities of Warren and Monticello, thus allowing both to champion its completion. Though sufficient right-of-way was provided and grading done for interchanges at both ends as well as two additional lanes, this segment presently has stop signs at both ends and an intersection with Bradley County Road 96 (CR 96)/Barkada Road.

The second segment of the extension opened in September 2013. It connects the I-530 interchange in Pine Bluff with Highway 11 in Lincoln County and is 18 miles (29 km) in length. Currently, the segment is two lanes until further funding is available.

The remaining segments between Highway 35 and Pine Bluff will also be built as a two-lane expressway, similar to the existing Highway 35–US 278 segment and Pine Bluff intersection to Highway 114 segment. Initially, the only full interchange will be with the present I-530 at Pine Bluff; grade crossings will be built at other planned interchanges, but the stretches between grade crossings will be true two-lane freeways with grade separations and service roads where needed. The route includes sufficient right-of-way to build interchanges and two additional lanes later; the Pine Bluff interchange will be a full freeway-to-freeway facility designed for the future four-lane freeway. On August 18, 2015, the next segment—Highway 114 to Highway 11—was opened to traffic. The segment from AR 11 to AR 35 is not yet built. Eventually, the completed route will extend 88 miles from Little Rock to I-69 near Monticello.

All exits are unnumbered.

County	Location	mi	km	Destinations	Notes
Drew		86.3	138.9	I-69 – Monticello	Proposed southern terminus
Drew		83.3	134.1	US 278 – Monticello, Wilmar, Warren	Current southern terminus; at-grade intersection
Drew		78.3	126.0	AR 35 to US 63 / US 425 – Rye	Current northern terminus; at-grade intersection
Gap in route
Lincoln		67.3	108.3	AR 11	Current southern terminus; incomplete diamond interchange
Lincoln		62.3	100.3	AR 114 – Star City, Monticello, Palmyra	At-grade intersection
Lincoln		60.3	97.0	AR 212 to AR 54 – Star City	At-grade intersection
Cleveland	No major junctions				
Jefferson		44.3	71.3	I-530 / US 65 (US 63 / US 79) – Little Rock, Dumas, McGehee, Lake Village	Northern terminus; exit 44 on I-530
1.000 mi = 1.609 km; 1.000 km = 0.621 mi: Incomplete access; Unopened
