= Tull, Arkansas =

- Town
- Location of Tull in Grant County, Arkansas.
- Coordinates: 34°26′27″N 92°34′40″W
- Country: United States
- State: Arkansas
- County: Grant

Area
  - Total: 4.10 sq mi (10.61 km^{2})
  - Land: 4.03 sq mi (10.44 km^{2})
  - Water: 0.066 sq mi (0.17 km^{2})
- Elevation: 351 ft (107 m)

Population (2020)
  - Total: 484
  - Estimate (2025): 499 ▲
  - Density: 120.0/sq mi (46.35/km^{2})
- Time zone: UTC-6 (Central (CST))
  - Summer (DST): UTC-5 (CDT)
- FIPS code: 05-70220
- GNIS feature ID: 2406762

Tull is a town in Grant County, Arkansas, United States. As of the 2020 census, Tull had a population of 484. It is part of the Central Arkansas region.

== Geography ==
Tull is located in northwestern Grant County and is bordered to the north and northwest by the Saline County line. The northwest border of the town follows the Saline River, a south-flowing tributary of the Ouachita River. Tull is 16 miles (26 km) northwest of Sheridan, the Grant County seat, and 10 miles (16 km) south of Benton.

According to the United States Census Bureau, the town has a total area of 3.4 square miles (8.9 km^{2}), of which 0.02 square miles (0.04 km^{2}), or 0.40%, is water.

== Demographics ==
Historical population
Census	Pop.	Note	%±
1970	179		—
1980	281		57.0%
1990	313		11.4%
2000	358		14.4%
2010	448		25.1%
2020	484		8.0%
2025 (est.)	499	▲	3.1%
U.S. Decennial Census

As of the census of 2000, there were 358 people, 155 households, and 110 families residing in the town. The population density was 40.4/km^{2} (104.6/mi^{2}). There were 167 housing units at an average density of 18.9/km^{2} (48.8/mi^{2}). The racial makeup of the town was 99.16% White, 0.56% Native American, and 0.28% from two or more races. 3.07% of the population were Hispanic or Latino of any race.

There were 155 households, out of which 26.5% had children under the age of 18 living with them, 64.5% were married couples living together, 3.9% had a female householder with no husband present, and 29.0% were non-families. 27.1% of all households were made up of individuals, and 20.0% had someone living alone who was 65 years of age or older. The average household size was 2.31 and the average family size was 2.81.

In the town, the population was spread out, with 19.0% under the age of 18, 7.8% from 18 to 24, 27.9% from 25 to 44, 29.1% from 45 to 64, and 16.2% who were 65 years of age or older. The median age was 43 years. For every 100 females, there were 101.1 males. For every 100 females age 18 and over, there were 93.3 males.

The median income for a household in the town was $33,750, and the median income for a family was $41,406. Males had a median income of $30,417 versus $29,250 for females. The per capita income for the town was $18,017. About 10.1% of families and 10.7% of the population were below the poverty line, including 14.1% of those under age 18 and 7.8% of those age 65 or over.

== Education ==
Tull is in the Bauxite School District, and is zoned to Bauxite High School.
