= Grant County, Arkansas =

County in Arkansas, United States

- County
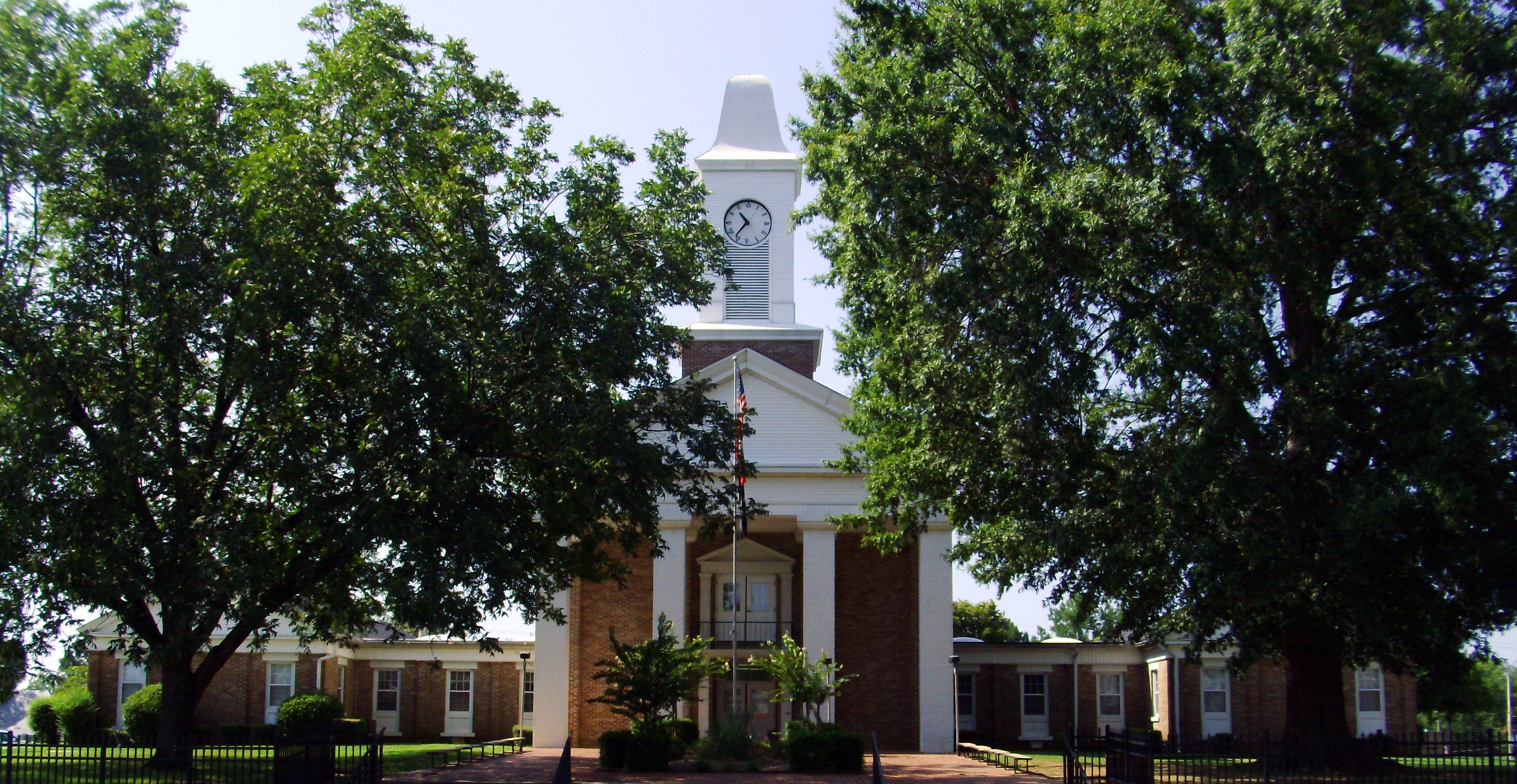
- Grant County Courthouse in Sheridan

- Location within the U.S. state of Arkansas
- Coordinates: 34°17′40″N 92°25′54″W
- Country: United States
- State: Arkansas
- Established: February 4, 1869
- Named for: Ulysses S. Grant
- Seat: Sheridan
- Largest city: Sheridan

Area
  - Total: 633 sq mi (1,640 km^{2})
  - Land: 632 sq mi (1,640 km^{2})
  - Water: 1.1 sq mi (2.8 km^{2}) 0.2%

Population (2020)
  - Total: 17,958
  - Estimate (2025): 18,756 ▲
  - Density: 28.4/sq mi (11.0/km^{2})
- Time zone: UTC−6 (Central)
  - Summer (DST): UTC−5 (CDT)
- Congressional district: 4th
- Website: www.grantcountyar.com

Grant County is a county in the U.S. state of Arkansas. Its population was 17,958 at the 2020 United States census. The county seat is Sheridan. Grant County is included in the Little Rock-North Little Rock-Conway metropolitan area. It is an alcohol prohibition or dry county.

== History ==
Established on February 4, 1869, Grant County was named after of U.S. President-elect Ulysses S. Grant.

Robert W. Glover, a Missionary Baptist clergyman who served in both houses of the Arkansas General Assembly (1905-1912) from Sheridan, introduced in 1909 the resolution calling for the establishment of four state agricultural colleges. His brother David Delano Glover was a state representative in the 1907 session and a member of the United States House of Representatives from 1929 to 1935, having been unseated in 1934 by Grant County native John Little McClellan who at the time was practicing law in Camden. McClellan later went on to become Arkansas's longest serving U.S. senator.

== Geography ==
According to the U.S. Census Bureau, the county has a total area of 633 square miles (1,640 km^{2}), of which 632 square miles (1,640 km^{2}) is land and 1.1 square miles (2.8 km^{2}) (0.2%) is water. Grant County is considered part of the Arkansas Timberlands geographical area.

=== Major highways ===
- Interstate 530 / U.S. Highway 65
- U.S. Highway 167
  - US 167B
- U.S. Highway 270
- Highway 35
- Highway 46
- Highway 190
- Highway 222
- Highway 229
- Highway 291
- Highway 365

=== Adjacent counties ===
- Saline County (north)
- Pulaski County (northeast)
- Jefferson County (east)
- Cleveland County (southeast)
- Dallas County (south)
- Hot Spring County (west)

== Demographics ==
Historical population
| Census | Pop. | Note | %± |
|---|---|---|---|
| 1870 | 3,943 | | — |
| 1880 | 6,185 | | 56.9% |
| 1890 | 7,786 | | 25.9% |
| 1900 | 7,671 | | −1.5% |
| 1910 | 9,425 | | 22.9% |
| 1920 | 10,710 | | 13.6% |
| 1930 | 9,834 | | −8.2% |
| 1940 | 10,477 | | 6.5% |
| 1950 | 9,024 | | −13.9% |
| 1960 | 8,294 | | −8.1% |
| 1970 | 9,711 | | 17.1% |
| 1980 | 13,008 | | 34.0% |
| 1990 | 13,948 | | 7.2% |
| 2000 | 16,464 | | 18.0% |
| 2010 | 17,853 | | 8.4% |
| 2020 | 17,958 | | 0.6% |
| 2025 (est.) | 18,756 | ▲ | 4.4% |
U.S. Decennial Census; 1790–1960 1900–1990; 1990–2000 2010

=== 2020 census ===
As of the 2020 census, the county had a population of 17,958. The median age was 41.4 years. 23.1% of residents were under the age of 18 and 18.3% of residents were 65 years of age or older. For every 100 females there were 98.3 males, and for every 100 females age 18 and over there were 96.7 males age 18 and over.

The racial makeup of the county was 90.8% White, 2.6% Black or African American, 0.5% American Indian and Alaska Native, 0.4% Asian, <0.1% Native Hawaiian and Pacific Islander, 1.0% from some other race, and 4.8% from two or more races. Hispanic or Latino residents of any race comprised 2.5% of the population.

26.2% of residents lived in urban areas, while 73.8% lived in rural areas.

There were 7,091 households in the county, of which 32.1% had children under the age of 18 living in them. Of all households, 54.9% were married-couple households, 17.4% were households with a male householder and no spouse or partner present, and 22.5% were households with a female householder and no spouse or partner present. About 24.8% of all households were made up of individuals and 11.7% had someone living alone who was 65 years of age or older.

There were 7,839 housing units, of which 9.5% were vacant. Among occupied housing units, 78.3% were owner-occupied and 21.7% were renter-occupied. The homeowner vacancy rate was 1.3% and the rental vacancy rate was 8.9%.

=== 2000 census ===
As of the 2000 census, there were 16,464 people, 4,241 households, and 4,780 families residing in the county. The population density was 26 inhabitants per square mile (10/km^{2}). There were 6,960 housing units at an average density of 11 per square mile (4.2/km^{2}). The racial makeup of the county was 95.55% White, 2.47% Black or African American, 0.45% Native American, 0.13% Asian, 0.03% Pacific Islander, 0.64% from other races, and 0.73% from two or more races. 1.15% of the population were Hispanic or Latino of any race.

There were 6,241 households, out of which 35.60% had children under the age of 18 living with them, 64.70% were married couples living together, 8.50% had a female householder with no husband present, and 23.40% were non-families. 20.40% of all households were made up of individuals, and 9.00% had someone living alone who was 65 years of age or older. The average household size was 2.61 and the average family size was 3.00.

In the county, the population was spread out, with 25.90% under the age of 18, 8.00% from 18 to 24, 29.60% from 25 to 44, 24.30% from 45 to 64, and 12.20% who were 65 years of age or older. The median age was 37 years. For every 100 females, there were 98.50 males. For every 100 females age 18 and over, there were 96.30 males.

The median income for a household in the county was $37,182, and the median income for a family was $42,901. Males had a median income of $31,842 versus $22,098 for females. The per capita income for the county was $17,547. About 7.80% of families and 10.20% of the population were below the poverty line, including 12.50% of those under age 18 and 13.00% of those age 65 or over.

The largest self-identified ancestry groups in Grant County, Arkansas are:

- 30.1% English
- 12.0% American
- 9.5% Irish
- 8.9% German
- 1.4% Italian
- 1.2% Polish
- 1.1% French
- 0.7% Swedish

== Government ==
=== Government ===
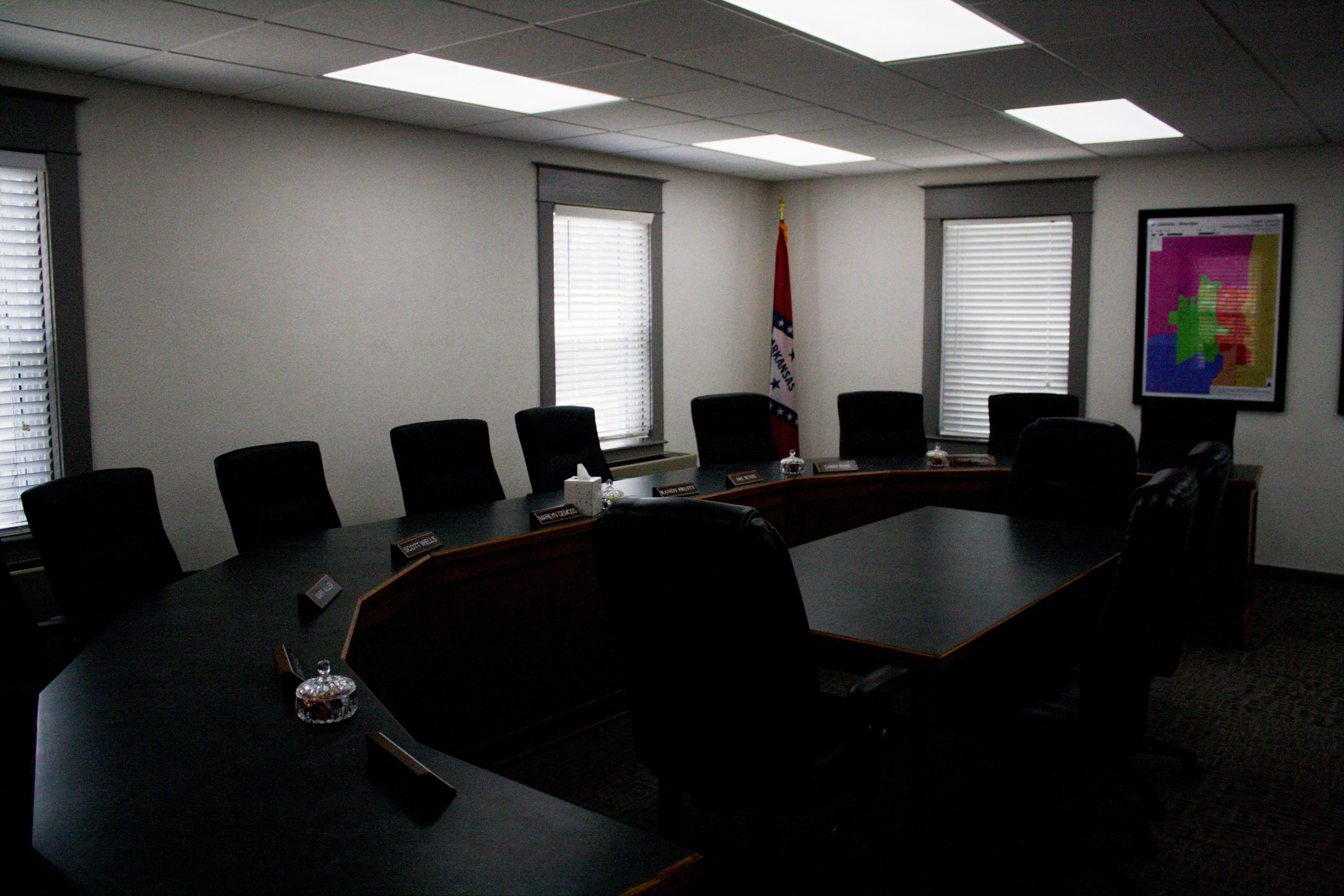
Quorum Court Room in the Grant County Courthouse

The county government is a constitutional body granted specific powers by the Constitution of Arkansas and the Arkansas Code. The quorum court is the legislative branch of the county government and controls all spending and revenue collection. Representatives are called justices of the peace and are elected from county districts every even-numbered year. The number of districts in a county vary from nine to fifteen, and district boundaries are drawn by the county election commission. The Grant County Quorum Court has nine members. Presiding over quorum court meetings is the county judge, who serves as the chief operating officer of the county. The county judge is elected at-large and does not vote in quorum court business, although capable of vetoing quorum court decisions.

Grant County, Arkansas Elected countywide officials
| Position | Officeholder | Party |
|---|---|---|
| County Judge | Randy Pruitt | Republican |
| County/Circuit Clerk | Geral Harrison | Republican |
| Sheriff/Collector | Pete Roberts | Republican |
| Treasurer | Tim Stuckey | Republican |
| Assessor | Kristy Pruitt | Republican |
| Coroner | Michael Walton | Republican |
| Surveyor | Brian Watson | (Unknown) |

The composition of the Quorum Court following the 2024 elections is 8 Republicans and 1 Independent. Justices of the Peace (members) of the Quorum Court following the elections are:

- District 1: Jason Roshto (R)
- District 2: Danny Bone (R)
- District 3: James D. Easley (R)
- District 4: Marilyn DeMoss (R)
- District 5: Scott Wells (R)
- District 6: Tony Carder (R)
- District 7: Michael Nevens (I)
- District 8: Mark Allen (R)
- District 9: Paul S. Drake (R)

Additionally, the townships of Grant County are entitled to elect their own respective constables, as set forth by the Constitution of Arkansas. Constables are largely of historical significance as they were used to keep the peace in rural areas when travel was more difficult. The township constables as of the 2024 elections are:

- Calvert: Reggie Jackson (R)
- Darysaw: Alton Davis (D)
- Franklin: Kurt Huffman (R)
- Madison: Butch Kelley (R)
- Tennessee: Martin Dockery (D)

=== Politics ===
Over the past few election cycles, Grant county has trended heavily towards the Republican Party in presidential elections. As of 2024, the last Democrat to carry this county was Bill Clinton in 1996.

United States presidential election results for Grant County, Arkansas
| Year | Republican | | Democratic | | Third party(ies) | |
| Year | No. | % | No. | % | No. | % |
|---|---|---|---|---|---|---|
| 1896 | 125 | 13.43% | 801 | 86.04% | 5 | 0.54% |
| 1900 | 175 | 23.36% | 574 | 76.64% | 0 | 0.00% |
| 1904 | 151 | 26.96% | 406 | 72.50% | 3 | 0.54% |
| 1908 | 160 | 21.28% | 524 | 69.68% | 68 | 9.04% |
| 1912 | 110 | 17.68% | 440 | 70.74% | 72 | 11.58% |
| 1916 | 190 | 16.56% | 957 | 83.44% | 0 | 0.00% |
| 1920 | 230 | 26.59% | 619 | 71.56% | 16 | 1.85% |
| 1924 | 133 | 15.50% | 628 | 73.19% | 97 | 11.31% |
| 1928 | 439 | 29.54% | 1,045 | 70.32% | 2 | 0.13% |
| 1932 | 55 | 3.26% | 1,626 | 96.50% | 4 | 0.24% |
| 1936 | 147 | 13.06% | 978 | 86.86% | 1 | 0.09% |
| 1940 | 160 | 13.30% | 1,043 | 86.70% | 0 | 0.00% |
| 1944 | 334 | 23.49% | 1,088 | 76.51% | 0 | 0.00% |
| 1948 | 121 | 9.80% | 883 | 71.50% | 231 | 18.70% |
| 1952 | 637 | 29.84% | 1,487 | 69.65% | 11 | 0.52% |
| 1956 | 818 | 38.24% | 1,272 | 59.47% | 49 | 2.29% |
| 1960 | 563 | 24.81% | 1,394 | 61.44% | 312 | 13.75% |
| 1964 | 1,308 | 42.93% | 1,678 | 55.07% | 61 | 2.00% |
| 1968 | 627 | 17.07% | 852 | 23.20% | 2,194 | 59.73% |
| 1972 | 2,414 | 67.41% | 1,147 | 32.03% | 20 | 0.56% |
| 1976 | 1,047 | 21.61% | 3,797 | 78.39% | 0 | 0.00% |
| 1980 | 2,007 | 38.04% | 3,078 | 58.34% | 191 | 3.62% |
| 1984 | 3,167 | 59.16% | 2,148 | 40.13% | 38 | 0.71% |
| 1988 | 2,717 | 55.40% | 2,142 | 43.68% | 45 | 0.92% |
| 1992 | 2,272 | 36.66% | 3,190 | 51.47% | 736 | 11.87% |
| 1996 | 1,925 | 34.77% | 2,948 | 53.25% | 663 | 11.98% |
| 2000 | 3,285 | 54.63% | 2,535 | 42.16% | 193 | 3.21% |
| 2004 | 4,205 | 62.11% | 2,524 | 37.28% | 41 | 0.61% |
| 2008 | 5,023 | 73.94% | 1,562 | 22.99% | 208 | 3.06% |
| 2012 | 4,829 | 74.53% | 1,468 | 22.66% | 182 | 2.81% |
| 2016 | 5,725 | 76.90% | 1,373 | 18.44% | 347 | 4.66% |
| 2020 | 6,794 | 82.85% | 1,268 | 15.46% | 138 | 1.68% |
| 2024 | 6,755 | 83.62% | 1,192 | 14.76% | 131 | 1.62% |

== Communities ==
=== Cities ===
- Leola
- Prattsville
- Sheridan (county seat)

=== Towns ===
- Poyen
- Tull

=== Townships ===
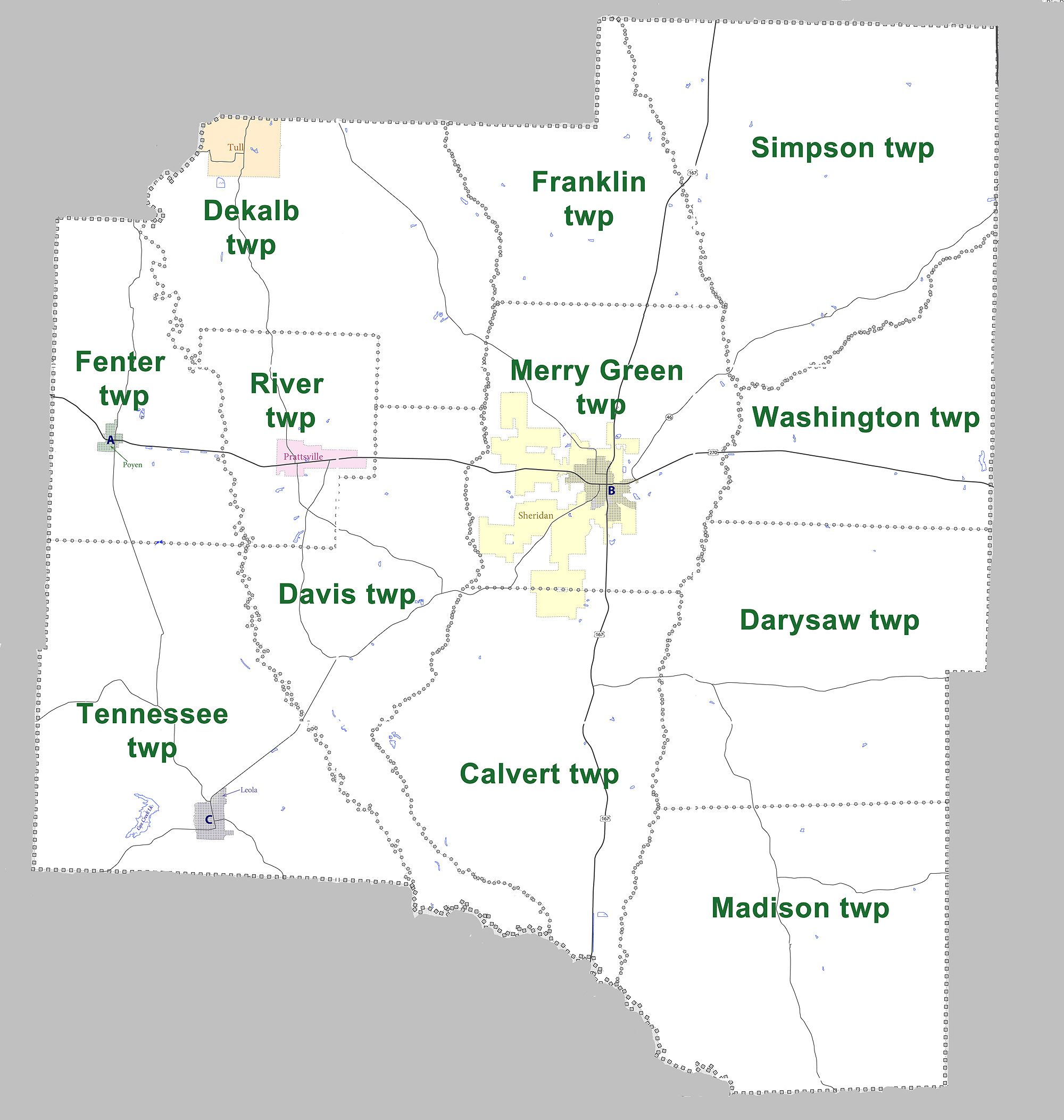
Townships in Grant County, Arkansas as of 2010

Townships in Arkansas are the divisions of a county. Each township includes unincorporated areas; some may have incorporated cities or towns within part of their boundaries. Arkansas townships have limited purposes in modern times. However, the United States census does list Arkansas population based on townships (sometimes referred to as "county subdivisions" or "minor civil divisions"). Townships are also of value for historical purposes in terms of genealogical research. Each town or city is within one or more townships in an Arkansas county based on census maps and publications. The townships of Grant County are listed below; listed in parentheses are the cities, towns, and/or census-designated places that are fully or partially inside the township.

- Calvert (small part of Sheridan)
- Darysaw
- Davis
- Dekalb (Tull)
- Fenter (Poyen)
- Franklin
- Madison
- Merry Green (most of Sheridan)
- River (Prattsville)
- Simpson
- Tennessee (Leola)
- Washington

== Culture ==
Grant County is home to Jenkins' Ferry Battleground State Park.

== See also ==
- List of dry counties in Arkansas
- List of counties in Arkansas
- List of lakes in Grant County, Arkansas
- National Register of Historic Places listings in Grant County, Arkansas
