= Fifth Avenue Historic District (Pine Bluff, Arkansas) =

Historic district in Arkansas, United States

- Pine Bluff Fifth Avenue Historic District
- U.S. National Register of Historic Places
- U.S. Historic district
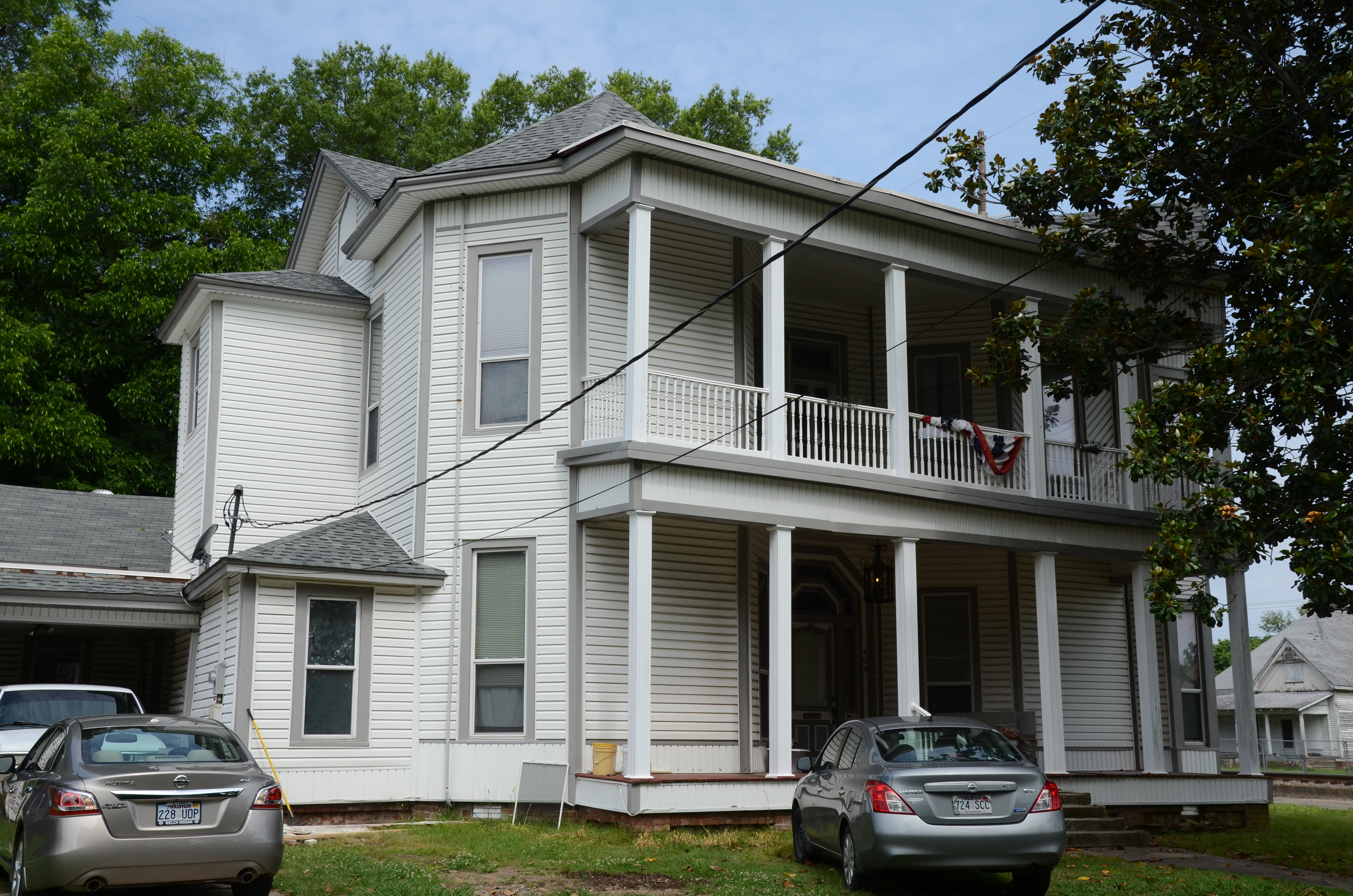

- Location within Arkansas Location within the United States
- Location: 5th Ave., Pine Bluff, Arkansas
- Coordinates: 34°13′30″N 92°0′27″W
- Area: 11 acres (4.5 ha)
- Built: 1886
- Architect: Multiple
- Architectural style: Bungalow/craftsman, Queen Anne, Prairie;Colonial Revival
- NRHP reference No.: 80000777
- Added to NRHP: October 29, 1980

The Pine Bluff Fifth Avenue Historic District encompasses a small neighbourhood with most homes being built before 1915. It includes 3-1/2 blocks of Fifth Avenue, the matching section of Fourth Avenue, and houses on the connecting streets. The area was home to main of Pine Bluff's political and business elites from the late 19th century onward, and includes a number the city's finest Queen Anne Victorian houses.

The district was listed on the National Register of Historic Places in 1980.

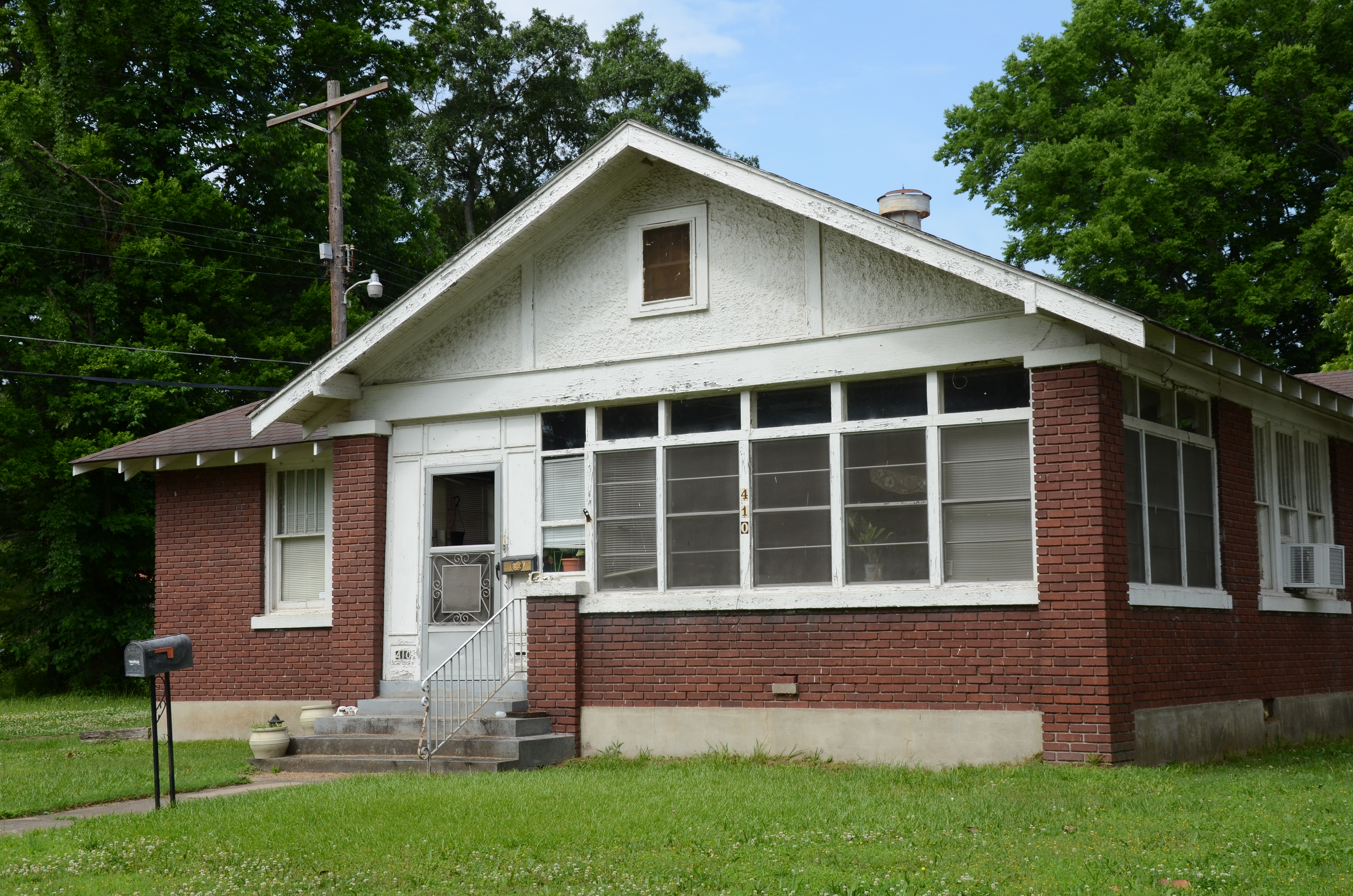
One of the buildings listed on the historic register in the district.

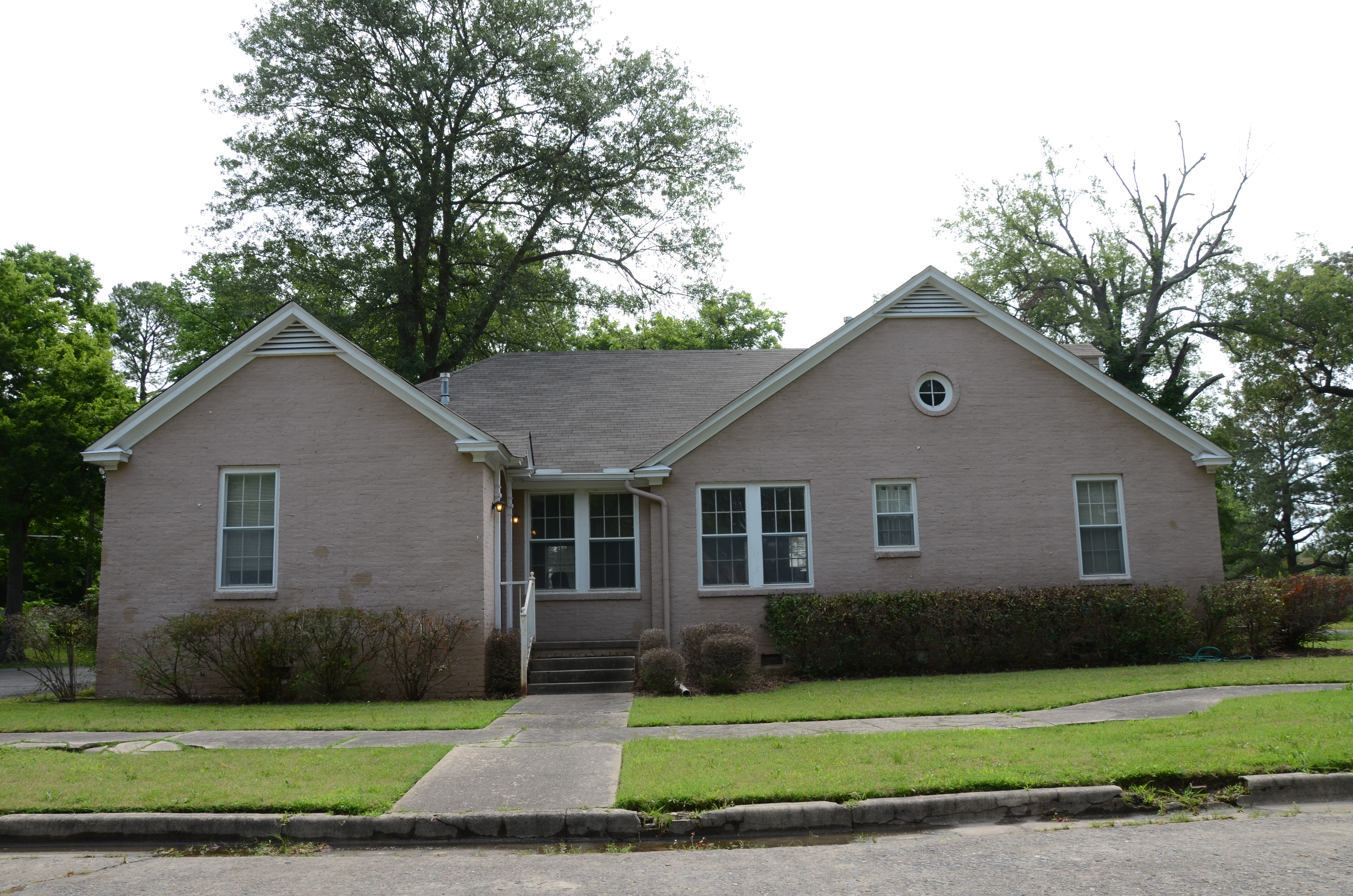
Another historic building in the district.

== See also ==
- National Register of Historic Places listings in Jefferson County, Arkansas
