= Taylor Field (Pine Bluff, Arkansas) =

- U.S. National Register of Historic Places
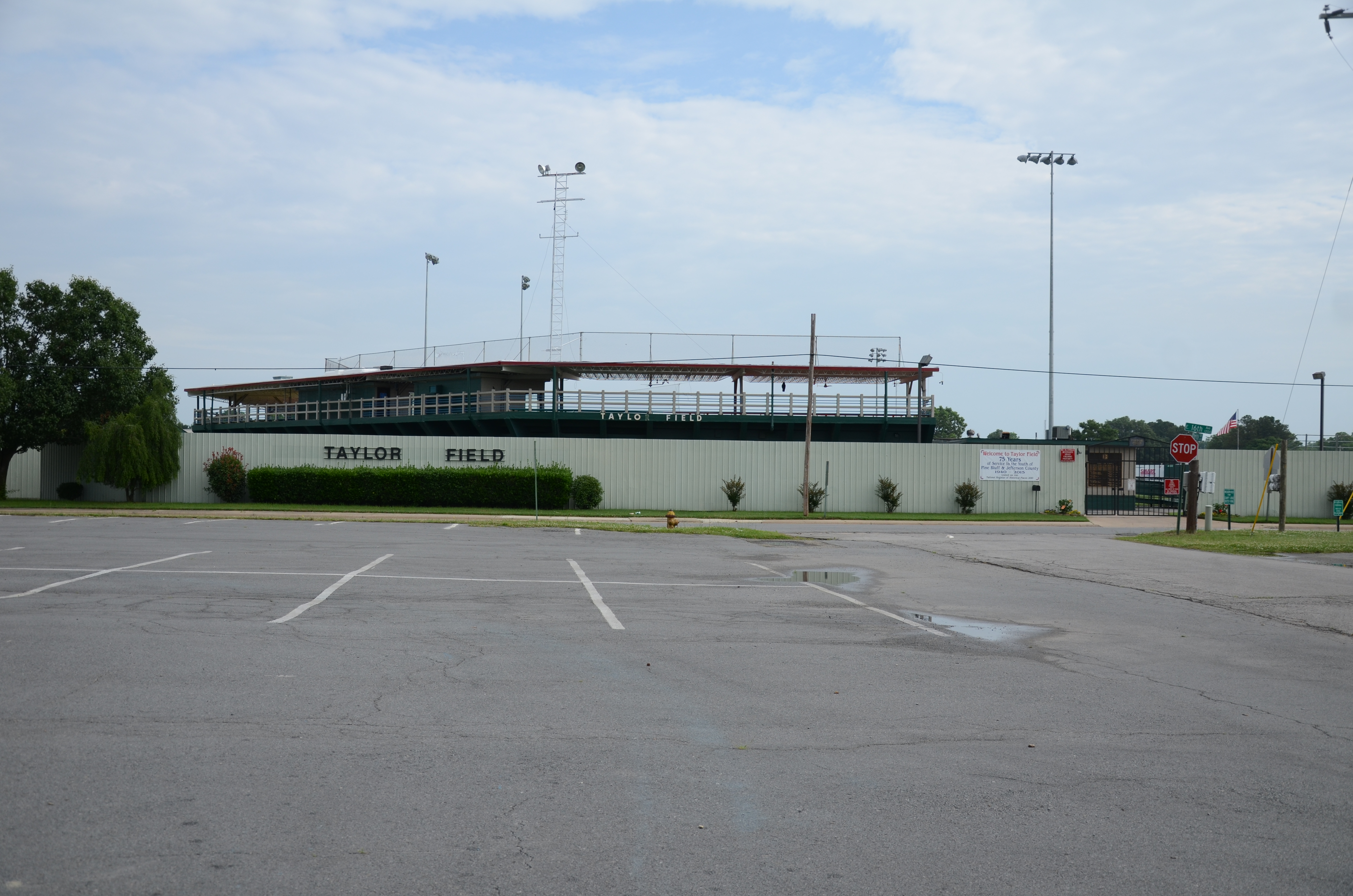

- Location within Arkansas Location within the United States
- Location: 1201 E. 16th St., Pine Bluff, Arkansas
- Coordinates: 34°12′58″N 91°59′29″W
- Area: 4 acres (1.6 ha)
- Built: 1939
- Built by: Works Progress Administration
- Architect: Seligman, Mitchell
- Architectural style: Plain Traditional
- MPS: New Deal Recovery Efforts in Arkansas MPS
- NRHP reference No.: 09001250
- Added to NRHP: January 21, 2010

Taylor Field is a baseball stadium at 1201 East 16th Street in Pine Bluff, Arkansas. The stadium was built in 1939–40 with funding support from the Works Progress Administration and a design by local architect Mitchell Seligman. It was listed on the National Register of Historic Places in 2010. The stadium played host until 1955 to minor league baseball teams, including the Pine Bluff Judges. Its grandstand has a capacity of about 1800, with another 600 in the bleachers. The field is 315 feet (96 m) down the foul lines and 390 feet (120 m) to center field.

== See also ==
- National Register of Historic Places listings in Jefferson County, Arkansas
