= Prattsville, Arkansas =

- City

- Location of Prattsville in Grant County, Arkansas.
- Coordinates: 34°19′02″N 92°32′34″W
- Country: United States
- State: Arkansas
- County: Grant

Area
  - Total: 1.63 sq mi (4.21 km^{2})
  - Land: 1.62 sq mi (4.19 km^{2})
  - Water: 0.0077 sq mi (0.02 km^{2})
- Elevation: 312 ft (95 m)

Population (2020)
  - Total: 289
  - Estimate (2025): 299 ▲
  - Density: 178.7/sq mi (68.99/km^{2})
- Time zone: UTC-6 (Central (CST))
  - Summer (DST): UTC-5 (CDT)
- ZIP code: 72129
- Area code: 870
- FIPS code: 05-57230
- GNIS feature ID: 2407158

Prattsville is a city in Grant County, Arkansas, United States. The population was 289 at the 2020 census. It is part of the Central Arkansas region.

== Geography ==
According to the United States Census Bureau, the city has a total area of 4.3 km^{2} (1.7 mi^{2}), all land.

== Demographics ==
Historical population
| Census | Pop. | Note | %± |
|---|---|---|---|
| 1970 | 299 | | — |
| 1980 | 317 | | 6.0% |
| 1990 | 251 | | −20.8% |
| 2000 | 282 | | 12.4% |
| 2010 | 305 | | 8.2% |
| 2020 | 289 | | −5.2% |
| 2025 (est.) | 299 | ▲ | 3.5% |
U.S. Decennial Census

As of the census of 2000, there were 282 people, 115 households, and 83 families residing in the town. The population density was 66.0/km^{2} (170.6/mi^{2}). There were 128 housing units at an average density of 30.0/km^{2} (77.4/mi^{2}). The racial makeup of the town was 99.65% White and 0.35% Asian. Hispanic or Latino of any race were 0.35% of the population.

There were 115 households, out of which 33.0% had children under the age of 18 living with them, 61.7% were married couples living together, 9.6% had a female householder with no husband present, and 27.0% were non-families. 26.1% of all households were made up of individuals, and 17.4% had someone living alone who was 65 years of age or older. The average household size was 2.45 and the average family size was 2.95.

In the town, the population was spread out, with 23.8% under the age of 18, 7.4% from 18 to 24, 27.0% from 25 to 44, 25.9% from 45 to 64, and 16.0% who were 65 years of age or older. The median age was 37 years. For every 100 females, there were 101.4 males. For every 100 females age 18 and over, there were 90.3 males.

The median income for a household in the town was $42,679, and the median income for a family was $47,500. Males had a median income of $30,000 versus $19,000 for females. The per capita income for the town was $17,544. About 9.8% of families and 12.5% of the population were below the poverty line, including 19.1% of those under the age of eighteen and 20.4% of those 65 or over.

== History ==
Prattsville, then part of Saline County, was first settled by Elder Joab Pratt, a Baptist preacher, accompanied by several other families, with the surnames of Mayfield, Pumphrey, McDaniel, and Cobb, all arrived by wagon train from Bibb County, Alabama in 1841. Mr. Pratt is the source of the town's name. Mr. Pratt operated Pratt's Ferry close to where modern day Highway 270 crosses the Saline River and served as the postmaster for Lost Creek Post Office in 1846. Mr. Pratt founded Philadelphia Baptist Church soon after settling in the area south of the modern day city limits.

A section of the pre-statehood wagon road, the Old Camden Trail, was a highly traveled road throughout the nineteenth century that connected Little Rock and Camden. The Old Camden Trail was one of only five main roads in Arkansas during the 1800s and served early settlers of Prattsville. It is still marked on current maps in the town and has a historical marker north of Prattsville in the pioneer Village of Belfast, unfortunately the historic road has been gated and access to the marker blocked. During the Civil War, as part of Gen. Frederick Steele's Camden expedition, part of the larger Red River Campaign, attempted to cross the Saline River at Pratt's Ferry with his troops to get his nearly supply-less Union Army back to Little Rock along the Old Camden Road, however the water there was too high, and Gen. Steele and his troops turned south to cross at Jenkins Ferry, where his Union Army were engaged by Confederate Troops in what is called the Battle of Jenkins Ferry. Gen. Steele's Camden expedition cost the Union army countless men and badly needed supplies. Gen. Steele and the Union Army escaped and made a retreat back to Little Rock along the Old Camden Trail.

== Education ==
The Sheridan School District operates area public schools. The Prattsville School District merged into the Sheridan district on July 1, 1994.

== Notable residents ==
David Delano Glover (January 18, 1868 – April 5, 1952) was born and attended public school in Prattsville. He was a U.S. representative from Arkansas. He served six terms from March 4, 1929, to January 3, 1935. He was admitted to the bar in 1910.

Robert W. Glover, David Delano Glover's brother and a Missionary Baptist pastor, served in both houses of the Arkansas Legislature (1905–1912) from Sheridan. He lived briefly as a child in Prattsville. In 1909, he introduced the resolution calling for the establishment of four state agricultural colleges.

Jackson T. Stephens (1923–2005), born on a farm near Prattsville during the Great Depression, co-founded Stephens, Inc., the largest trading company outside of Wall Street, located in Little Rock. He donated millions of dollars to worthy causes, including the University of Arkansas for Medical Sciences campus, the Delta Project, the U.S. Naval Academy, where he graduated with classmate Jimmy Carter, First Tee of Arkansas, the Prattsville Community Center, and others. His personal art collection, of which he donated a portion of to the Arkansas Arts Center, has been recognized as one of the most important art collections in the country. He served as chairman of the Augusta National Golf Club, overseeing The Masters golf tournament. He is interred at Philadelphia Cemetery in Prattsville.

Wilton "Witt" R. Stephens (1907–1991) was born in Prattsville and was the older brother of Jack Stephens. He began his career selling belt buckles and Bibles door to door in the late 1920s. During the Great Depression, Witt purchased municipal bonds for ten cents on the dollar, confident that the bonds would be redeemable under President Franklin D. Roosevelt's Reconstruction Finance Corporation. He sold the bonds at a profit to make a small fortune in the worst economic climate in American history. He went on to invest in natural gas, oil, and gold mining industries. After World War II, he was known as the "kingmaker" due to his influential power over the state's political branches. He served two terms in his father's State House seat starting in 1961. The Grant County Museum building is named in his honor. He is interred in Philadelphia Cemetery in Prattsville.

Ray Thornton (1928–) was a resident of Prattsville and is the nephew of Jack and Witt Stephens. Thornton is a former U.S. representative, lawyer, Arkansas Supreme Court justice, university president, and currently is the Public Service Fellow for the University of Arkansas at Little Rock William H. Bowen School of Law. Thornton played "a key role in fashioning the articles of impeachment against President Richard Nixon concerning the Watergate cover-up." Thornton was a party in the Supreme Court of the United States case, U.S. Term Limits, Inc. v. Thornton, which ruled Arkansas's and other states' attempts at placing term limits on members of the U.S. House of Representatives and the U.S. Senate unconstitutional.
