= Saline River (Ouachita River tributary) =

Coordinates: 34°23′01″N 93°59′48″W

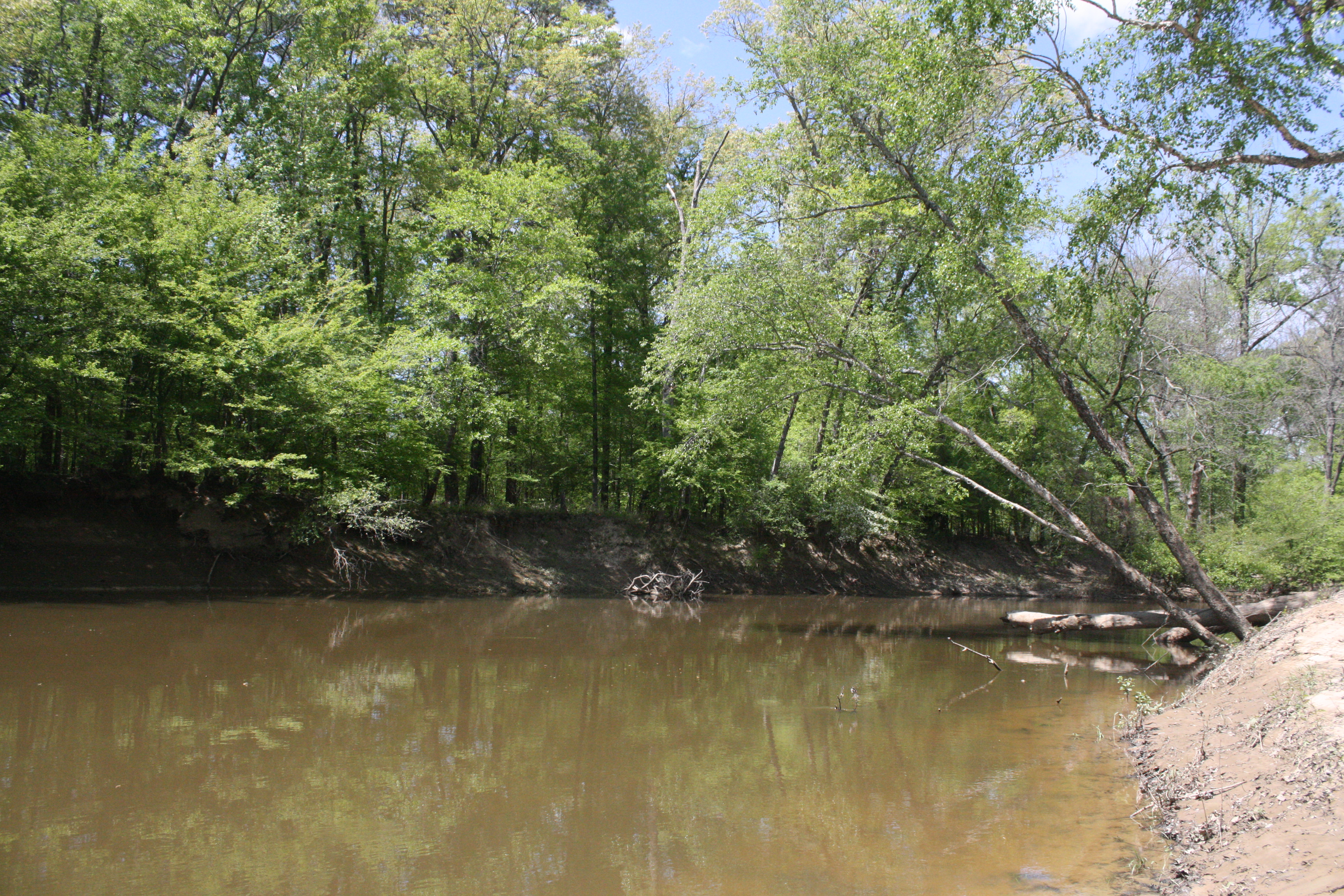
- The Saline River at Jenkins' Ferry; Battleground State Park, Arkansas

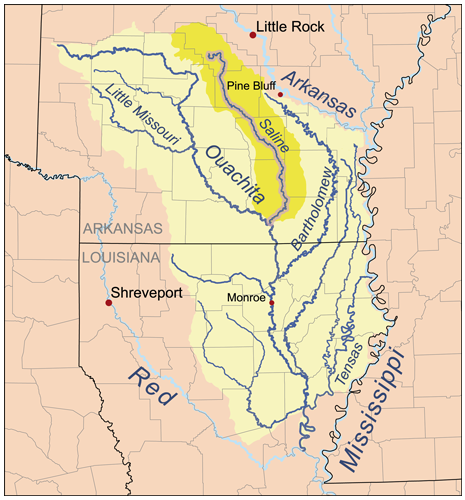
- Location of the Saline River within the Ouachita watershed

Location
- Country: United States
- State: Arkansas
- Counties: Ashley, Bradley, Cleveland, Garland, Grant, Saline

Physical characteristics
- Source
  - location: Ouachita Mountains, Saline County, Arkansas
  - elevation: 259 ft (79 m)
- Mouth
  - location: Ouachita River
- Length: 202 mi (325 km)
- Discharge
  - location: Felsenthal National Wildlife Refuge
  - average: 2,629 cu/ft. per sec.

The Saline River, also known as Saline Creek, is a 202-mile-long (325 km) tributary of the Ouachita River in the south central portion of the U.S. state of Arkansas. It is the longest river that flows entirely within the state of Arkansas.

== Geography ==
The Saline River begins in the eastern foothills of the Ouachita Mountains in Saline and Garland counties. The river has four headwater tributaries, the South Fork, the Middle Fork, the Alum Fork, and the North Fork, which merge northwest of the city of Benton.

The upper section of the Saline is a clear, cold-water stream with a series of fast-running shoals interspersed with quiet pools. The central section of the river has clear to murky water with long slower-moving pools interrupted by short stretches of fast water. The lower section is sluggish with murky water. The L'Aigle Creek connects to the Saline River near where the Saline River connects to the Ouachita River. During parts of the year the lower stretches of the river can be somewhat clogged with brush or trees.

After the merger of the three forks, the river flattens and travels through Grant, Cleveland, Bradley, and Ashley counties.

The river reaches its confluence with the Ouachita River in the marshy area north of Lake Jack Lee within the Felsenthal National Wildlife Refuge.

The Saline is relatively free of development. The river runs through dense forests which are home to bear, deer, mink, otters, beaver, muskrats, turkey, squirrel as well as alligators in southern sections of the river. The river provides excellent fishing, scenery, and wilderness floating.

Smallmouth, largemouth, rock bass, and spotted bass as well as warmouth, longear, green sunfish, bluegills, channel catfish, and crappie inhabit the river.

Picnicking and swimming facilities are available at Jenkins' Ferry Battleground State Park south of Sheridan which commemorates the Battle of Jenkins' Ferry during the American Civil War.

== History ==
=== Steamboats ===
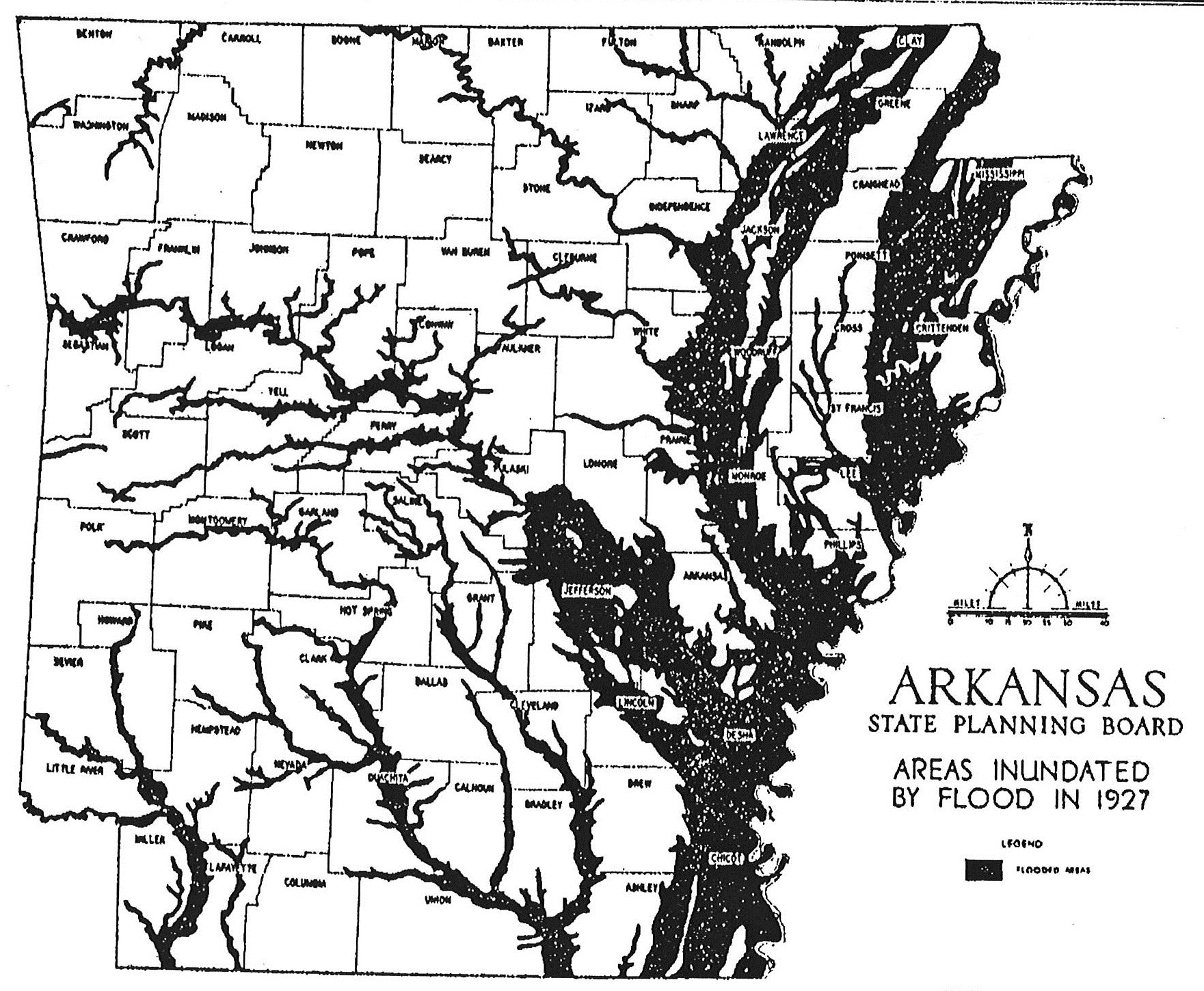
Flood of 1927 in Arkansas.

In the days of the steamboats, the steamboats traveled upstream as far as Bridges Bluff in Cleveland County. Freight boats went only as far north as Cornish Landing (also called Cavaness Landing) in Bradley County, Arkansas, where Hudgens Creek emptied into the Saline. Cotton, timber, and staves (to make wood barrels) were shipped downstream each winter and spring (while the river water was high) to Monroe, Louisiana and New Orleans, Louisiana. (Note: The Saline joined the Ouachita River in Louisiana, which flowed to the Black River, followed by the Red River, thence to the Mississippi River. The Red River was redirected using the Old River Control Structure in 1963.) Fifty-four steamboats have been documented on the Saline River.

- Carrie Poole, steamboat
- Enos Taylor, steamboat
- Handy, steamboat
- The Morgan Nelson, steamboat

Steamboat traffic on the Saline river was considerably reduced with the arrival of the rail system in 1880. One of the last steamboats on the Saline River was the Gate City, which sank on October 14, 1913, near Warren.

=== Flood of 1927 ===
The Great Mississippi Flood of 1927 flooded the areas along the Saline and Ouachita Rivers.

== See also ==
- List of rivers of Arkansas
