= Leola, Arkansas =

- Town
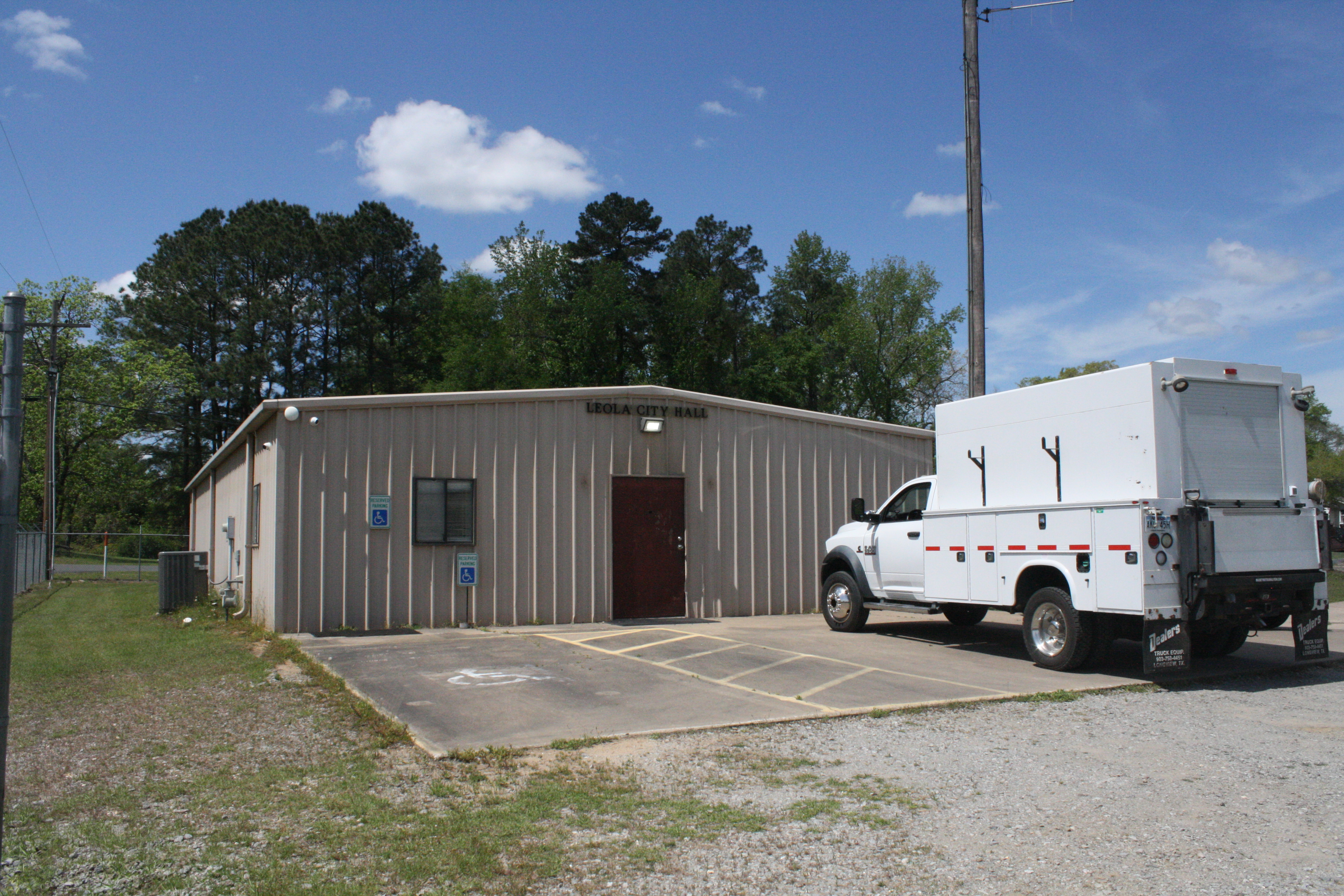
- City Hall

- Location of Leola in Grant County, Arkansas.
- Coordinates: 34°10′12″N 92°35′29″W
- Country: United States
- State: Arkansas
- County: Grant

Area
  - Total: 0.85 sq mi (2.21 km^{2})
  - Land: 0.85 sq mi (2.21 km^{2})
  - Water: 0 sq mi (0.00 km^{2})
- Elevation: 269 ft (82 m)

Population (2020)
  - Total: 460
  - Estimate (2025): 471 ▲
  - Density: 538.4/sq mi (207.86/km^{2})
- Time zone: UTC-6 (Central (CST))
  - Summer (DST): UTC-5 (CDT)
- ZIP code: 72084
- Area code: 870
- FIPS code: 05-39310
- GNIS feature ID: 2406005

Leola is a town in Grant County, Arkansas, United States. As of the 2020 census, Leola had a population of 460. It is the southernmost municipality within the Central Arkansas region.

== Geography ==
According to the United States Census Bureau, the town has a total area of 0.9 square miles (2.3 km^{2}), all land.

=== Climate ===
The climate in this area is characterized by hot, humid summers and generally mild to cool winters. According to the Köppen climate classification system, Leola has a humid subtropical climate, abbreviated "Cfa" on climate maps.

Climate data for Leola, Arkansas (1991–2020)
Month	Jan	Feb	Mar	Apr	May	Jun	Jul	Aug	Sep	Oct	Nov	Dec	Year
Mean daily maximum °F (°C)	53.4 (11.9)	57.5 (14.2)	66.3 (19.1)	75.6 (24.2)	81.8 (27.7)	89.2 (31.8)	93.1 (33.9)	92.5 (33.6)	86.4 (30.2)	76.1 (24.5)	64.0 (17.8)	55.7 (13.2)	74.3 (23.5)
Daily mean °F (°C)	41.5 (5.3)	45.3 (7.4)	53.1 (11.7)	61.9 (16.6)	70.1 (21.2)	77.9 (25.5)	81.7 (27.6)	80.5 (26.9)	73.5 (23.1)	62.5 (16.9)	51.2 (10.7)	44.0 (6.7)	61.9 (16.6)
Mean daily minimum °F (°C)	29.6 (−1.3)	33.0 (0.6)	39.8 (4.3)	48.2 (9.0)	58.4 (14.7)	66.7 (19.3)	70.3 (21.3)	68.5 (20.3)	60.6 (15.9)	48.9 (9.4)	38.5 (3.6)	32.4 (0.2)	49.6 (9.8)
Average precipitation inches (mm)	4.29 (109)	4.93 (125)	5.79 (147)	5.80 (147)	6.50 (165)	3.47 (88)	4.02 (102)	3.94 (100)	3.78 (96)	5.02 (128)	4.55 (116)	5.74 (146)	57.83 (1,469)
Average snowfall inches (cm)	1.1 (2.8)	0.6 (1.5)	0.3 (0.76)	0.0 (0.0)	0.0 (0.0)	0.0 (0.0)	0.0 (0.0)	0.0 (0.0)	0.0 (0.0)	0.0 (0.0)	0.0 (0.0)	0.0 (0.0)	2 (5.06)
Source: NOAA

== Demographics ==
Historical population
Census	Pop.	Note	%±
1910	398		—
1920	482		21.1%
1930	379		−21.4%
1940	412		8.7%
1950	313		−24.0%
1960	321		2.6%
1970	390		21.5%
1980	481		23.3%
1990	476		−1.0%
2000	515		8.2%
2010	501		−2.7%
2020	460		−8.2%
2025 (est.)	471	▲	2.4%
U.S. Decennial Census

As of the census of 2000, there were 515 people, 179 households, and 143 families residing in the town. The population density was 591.2 inhabitants per square mile (228.3/km^{2}). There were 213 housing units at an average density of 244.5 per square mile (94.4/km^{2}). The racial makeup of the town was 84.66% White, 0.19% Black or African American, 0.58% Native American, 0.39% Pacific Islander, 12.82% from other races, and 1.36% from two or more races. 14.76% of the population were Hispanic or Latino of any race.

There were 179 households, out of which 39.7% had children under the age of 18 living with them, 63.1% were married couples living together, 12.3% had a female householder with no husband present, and 20.1% were non-families. 16.2% of all households were made up of individuals, and 8.9% had someone living alone who was 65 years of age or older. The average household size was 2.88 and the average family size was 3.17.

In the town, the population was spread out, with 29.3% under the age of 18, 8.9% from 18 to 24, 32.2% from 25 to 44, 19.8% from 45 to 64, and 9.7% who were 65 years of age or older. The median age was 31 years. For every 100 females, there were 102.8 males. For every 100 females age 18 and over, there were 102.2 males.

The median income for a household in the town was $30,625, and the median income for a family was $32,778. Males had a median income of $26,250 versus $17,292 for females. The per capita income for the town was $11,844. About 8.6% of families and 10.0% of the population were below the poverty line, including 6.4% of those under age 18 and 19.0% of those age 65 or over.

== Attractions ==
Cox Creek Lake is a man made lake, created by the Arkansas Game and Fish Commission by damming Cox Creek, a tributary of the Saline River. The Lake covers an area of approximately 254 acres outside Leola's city limits. Camping is permitted, tent or R.V. for a fee, it also includes a boat ramp and a fishing pier.

== History ==
In 1864, the Camden Expedition (part of a larger military operation, the Red River Campaign), under the command of General Frederick Steele, marched his union troops along the Old Camden Road that passed through Leola after his supplies were depleted and Gen. Kirby's Confederates were on his rear flank as they approached the Jenkins' Ferry on the Saline River. A bloody battle of Jenkins' Ferry ensued. The Union troops barely crossed the Saline River, when they did, they burned the pontoon bridge and resulted in a victory in retreated as the Union marched back to Union controlled Little Rock via Prattsville and Old Belfast along the Old Camden Road.

In the late summer of 1921, Winters Syndicate drilled down over 1,920 feet exploring for oil in the Leola area. The Belmont Oil Company planned to develop oil fields in Leola, too. However, no oil was discovered.

Ray Thornton (1928-2016) attended public school in Leola. Thornton is a former U.S. representative, lawyer, Arkansas Supreme Court justice, university president, and currently is the Public Service Fellow for the University of Arkansas at Little Rock William H. Bowen School of Law. Thornton played "a key role in fashioning the articles of impeachment against President Richard Nixon concerning the Watergate cover-up." Thornton was a party in the Supreme Court of the United States case, U.S. Term Limits, Inc. v. Thornton, that ruled that Arkansas and other states attempts at placing term limits on members of the U.S. House of Representatives and the U.S. Senate, unconstitutional.

== Education ==
The Sheridan School District operates area public schools. On July 1, 1987, the Leola School District was annexed and consolidated into the Sheridan School district.
