= Jean Jordan =

Jean Jordan may refer to:

- Raye Jean Montague (1935–2018), an American naval engineer
- Jean Jordan, a victim of the serial killer Peter Sutcliffe
- Jean Jordan, a contestant of Big Brother 1 (American season)
