= Jefferson County Courthouse (Arkansas) =

Historic building in Arkansas, United States

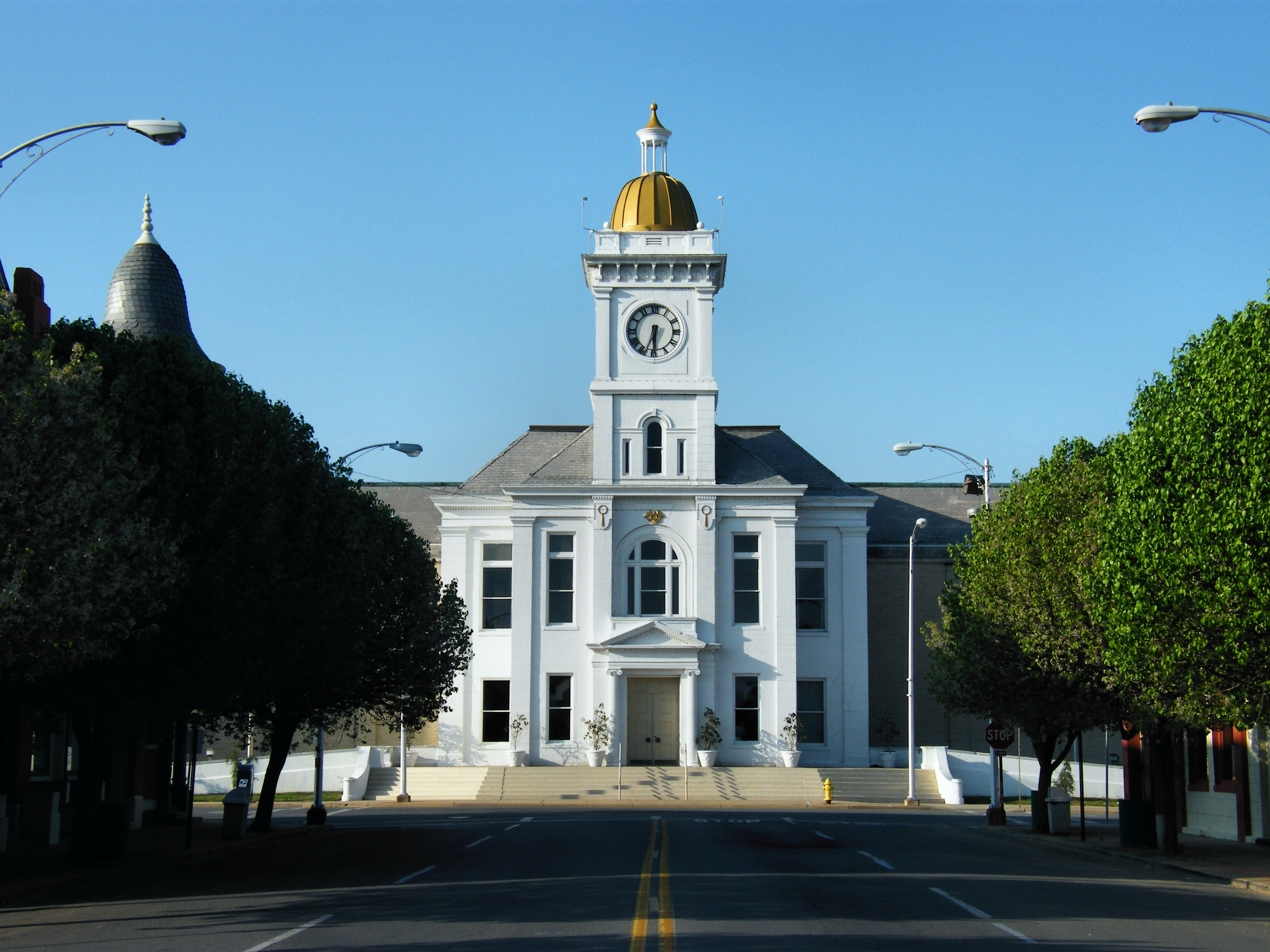
- View from South Main Street in 2011
- Interactive map of the Jefferson County Courthouse area

General information
- Type: Courthouse
- Architectural style: Victorian
- Location: 101 W. Barraque St., Pine Bluff, Arkansas, United States
- Coordinates: 34°13′47.2″N 92°00′11.9″W
- Completed: 1856 (170 years ago)

Technical details
- Floor count: 2

Design and construction
- Known for: Battle of Pine Bluff
- Jefferson County Courthouse
- U.S. Historic district – Contributing property
- Part of: Pine Bluff Commercial Historic District (ID08000438)
- Added to NRHP: May 20, 2008

The Jefferson County Courthouse is the center of county government for Jefferson County, Arkansas. It is located in the Pine Bluff Commercial Historic District in Pine Bluff on the border between the Arkansas Delta and Piney Woods.

== History ==
Built in 1856, the building was largely destroyed by fire in 1976. However, the surviving portions of the building were incorporated into the restored structure. The courthouse was listed on the National Register of Historic Places within the Pine Bluff Commercial Historic District submittal in 2008.

== See also ==
- List of county courthouses in Arkansas
- National Register of Historic Places listings in Jefferson County, Arkansas
