= Merchants and Planters Bank Building =

- U.S. National Register of Historic Places
- U.S. Historic district – Contributing property

- Location within Arkansas Location within the United States
- Location: 100 Main St., Pine Bluff, Arkansas
- Coordinates: 34°13′45″N 92°0′13″W
- Area: less than one acre
- Built: 1892
- Built by: W.I. Hilliard
- Architect: Thomas A. Harding
- Architectural style: Late Victorian, Victorian-Romanesque
- Part of: Pine Bluff Commercial Historic District (ID08000438)
- NRHP reference No.: 78000600

Significant dates
- Added to NRHP: August 1, 1978
- Designated CP: May 20, 2008

The Merchants and Planters Bank Building Historic Landmark is a large brick structure featuring in its architectural design round turrets, arched windows, granite foundation and decorative brick work. In addition to its architectural significance, it represents a large part of downtown Pine Bluff's commercial development. The Merchants & Planters Bank replaced its initially occupied 1872 structure in 1891. Included was a new vault by the Mosler Company still in working order today. The installation of the vault proved to be a good investment as a fire on January 24, 1892, destroyed the new building and almost everything on the north half of the block between Barraque Street and 2nd Avenue and Main and Pine Streets. Little Rock architect Thomas A. Harding was immediately employed to draw plans for a fine new building. A contract was let to W. I. Hilliard of Pine Bluff and the new building was completed on October 31, 1892. The plumbing and gas fixtures were installed by F.A. Stanley and John P. Haight furnished the millwork. The interior fixtures of polished oak with brass railings were supplied by A. H. Andrews of Chicago, "well-known bank outfitters." The bank had a tile floor and entrance arches and column supported by massive blocks of Fourche mountain (Pulaski County) granite. The building was described as of modern bank architecture and, in exterior and interior adornment, as "one of the handsomest bank buildings in the South." The bank was a victim of the Great Depression in 1930 after 60 years of continuous operation.

The building was listed on the National Register of Historic Places pursuant to application by Jim Hood (1928-1999) in 1978. It is now the property of Southern Development Corporation.

== See also ==
- National Register of Historic Places listings in Jefferson County, Arkansas
