= Daily Republican =

Daily Republican may refer to:

- The Republican (Springfield, Massachusetts)
- The Daily Republican, newspaper in Marion, Ohio
- Daily Republican (Arkansas), a Reconstruction era newspaper published in Little Rock
- Daily Republican, a newspaper published in Monongahela, Pennsylvania
- Belvidere Daily Republican published in Belvidere, Illinois
- Mitchell Daily Republican published in Mitchell, South Dakota
- Winona Daily Republican in Winona, Minnesota
