= Wiley Jones =

American businessman

Walter "Wiley" Jones
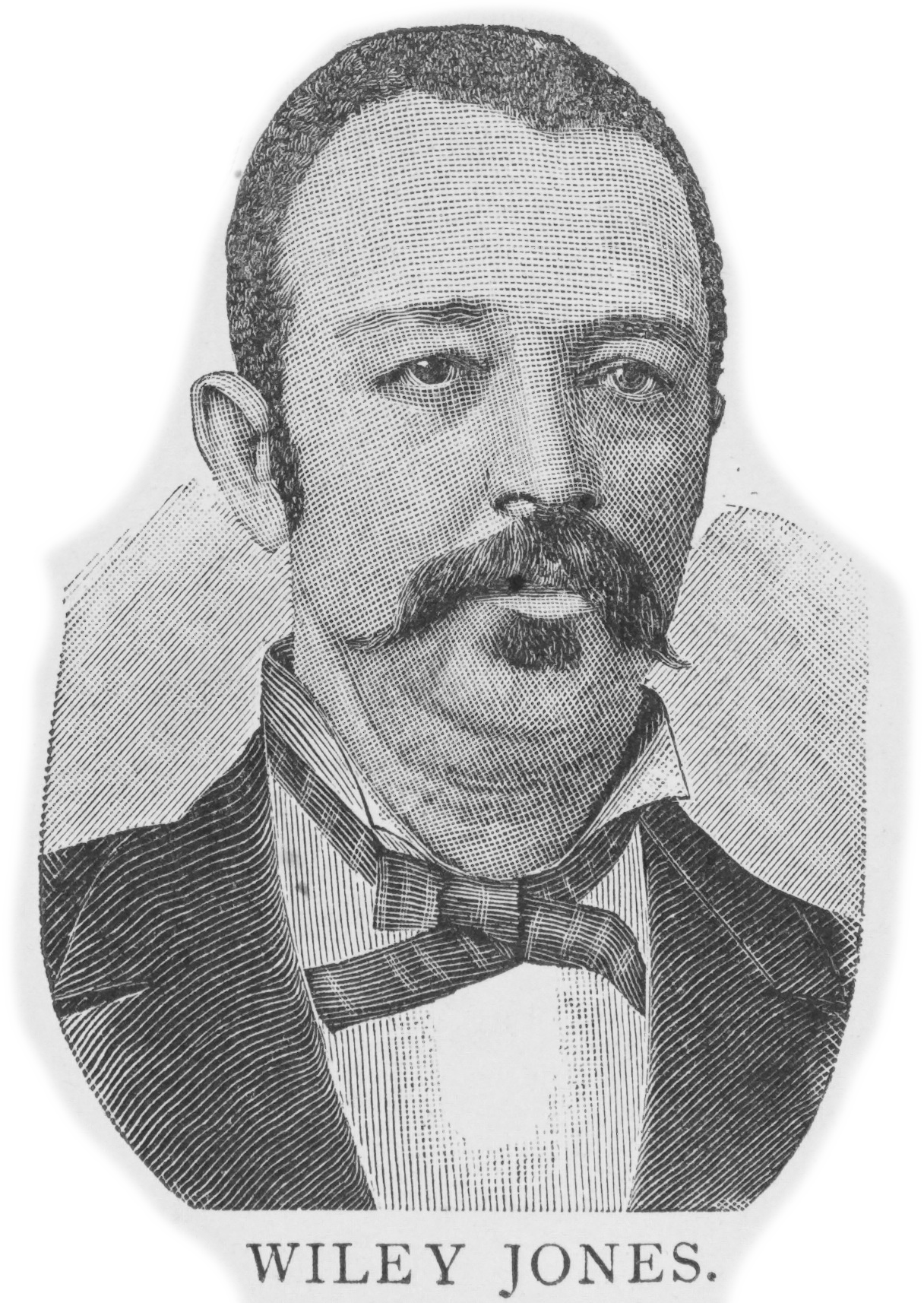
- Image of Jones from 1887
- Born: April 15, 1852; Madison County, Georgia, USA
- Died: December 7, 1904 (aged 52); Pine Bluff, Arkansas
- Resting place: Unnamed black cemetery in Pine Bluff which he owned
- Occupation: Businessman
- Political party: Republican
- Spouse: Never married

Walter "Wiley" Jones (July 14, 1841 – December 7, 1904) was a businessman in Pine Bluff, Arkansas, who was one of the wealthiest African-Americans in his state. He owned the first streetcar company in Pine Bluff and a park in the city which housed the fairgrounds. A devotee of horse racing, he owned stables and a race track on the park grounds. He also owned a saloon. He was active in civic affairs and was an advocate for civil rights.

== Early life ==
Walter "Wiley" Jones was born in Madison County in northeastern Georgia, on July 14, 1848. His parents were George Jones, a white planter, and Jones' slave, Anne, who had six children by George Jones: Matthew (who superintended the construction of the Wiley Jones Street Car Line), Thomas, Julia (wife of Ben Reed), Wiley, Taylor, and James (who managed many of Wiley's businesses). Wiley received his nickname because of his mischievous nature. At the age of five, he moved to Arkansas with his master and more than forty fellow slaves. They settled on the Governor Byrd plantation. George Jones died in 1858. Anne was called his wife in an 1889 biography of Jones, and she believed that George had promised to free herself and her children upon his death, but no manumission papers were found, and the family was kept as slaves and sold by the estate administrator, Peter Finerty, to James Yell, a lawyer and planter in Pine Bluff. Jones worked as a houseboy and carriage driver for his new master. When Jones was ten, he was given to Yell's only son, Fountain Pitts Yell, on the occasion of Pitts Yell's marriage. Pitts was a state representative from 1860 to 1861. During the American Civil War, James Yell became a Major General of the Arkansas State Militia, and Pitts became a colonel in Company S of the 26th Arkansas Infantry Regiment in the Confederate Army. James Yell's was transferred to the Confederate States Army in the summer of 1861, and James left the service and moved to Texas. Jones served for Pitts during the war until Pitts' death in 1864 at the Battle of Pleasant Hill in Louisiana. Jones then joined James Yell and his family in Waco, Texas. There, he served as a porter in a mercantile house for one year. He was then hired to drive a wagon carrying cotton on a route along the Brazos River to San Antonio.

== Business career ==
After the war, Jones returned to Monticello, Arkansas, with the Yell family. From there, he moved to Pine Bluff to work first as a mule driver and then as the business manager of the Yell plantation. In 1868, he began to work as a barber in the shop of Ben Reed, his brother-in-law, and continued in that pursuit until 1881. He then began dealing tobacco, cigars, and other goods. His brother, James, worked as his plantation business manager. In 1884, Jones got the better of state legislator and pastor William Young in a fist fight in front of Jones's saloon as a result of Young giving a speech which Jones did not like.

In August 1886, Jones secured the charter for the first streetcar line in Pine Bluff, Arkansas. He had one and one-fourth mile completed and the first car running byn October 19, 1886, coinciding with the first day of the annual fair of the Colored Industrial and Fair Association, an organization of which he was treasurer. He owned the fair grounds located on a 55-acre park he owned near main street and which was called Wiley Jones Park. His stables included one stallion, "Executor" that was of particular note, and later his colt, "Trickster". He also owned a number of mares and a herd of Durham and Holstein cattle. In 1901, his thoroughbred pace, "Billy H", broke a track record at a race in Windsor, Canada. In 1890, he purchased the second line in Pine Bluff, known as the Citizen's line, from H. P. Bradford for $125,000. In 1894, Jones sold his streetcar company to another streetcar syndicate. In 1901, Jones founded the Southern Mercantile Company, making his longtime friend Fred Havis president and his brother, James, manager.

=== Affiliations and public life ===
Jones was an active Republican and was a delegate to the 1880 Republican National Convention in Chicago, which nominated the James Garfield-Chester Arthur ticket. He opened a manual training school, the Colored Industrial Institute of Pine Bluff in about 1888. He played an important role in promoting blacks to office in Pine Bluff and in Jefferson County. He was an organizer of the Arkansas Colored Men's Association. In 1893, he was a delegate to the annual convention of the Colored Men's National Protective Association in Chicago. He was an active Mason and along with professor J. C. Corbin played an important role in the building of a Masonic Temple in Pine Bluff. Jones sold land at 12th Avenue and Main to the Masons to be used to build the temple, but the building was instead built at 4th and State.

== Personal life and death ==
He did not learn to read and write until he was an adult. He was a Christian but not a part of any denomination or church. He did not marry. He died in Pine Bluff on December 7, 1904, of Bright's disease. The funeral was held at the new black Masonic Temple. He is interred at the black cemetery which he had founded.
