= Chris Mercer =

Chris Mercer may refer to:

- Chris Mercer (activist), the first African-American state deputy prosecutor in the southern United States
- Chris Mercer, saxophonist with the bands John Mayall & the Bluesbreakers and Juicy Lucy
- Chris Harper Mercer, perpetrator of the 2015 Umpqua Community College shooting
