= Hotel Pines =

- U.S. National Register of Historic Places
- U.S. Historic district – Contributing property
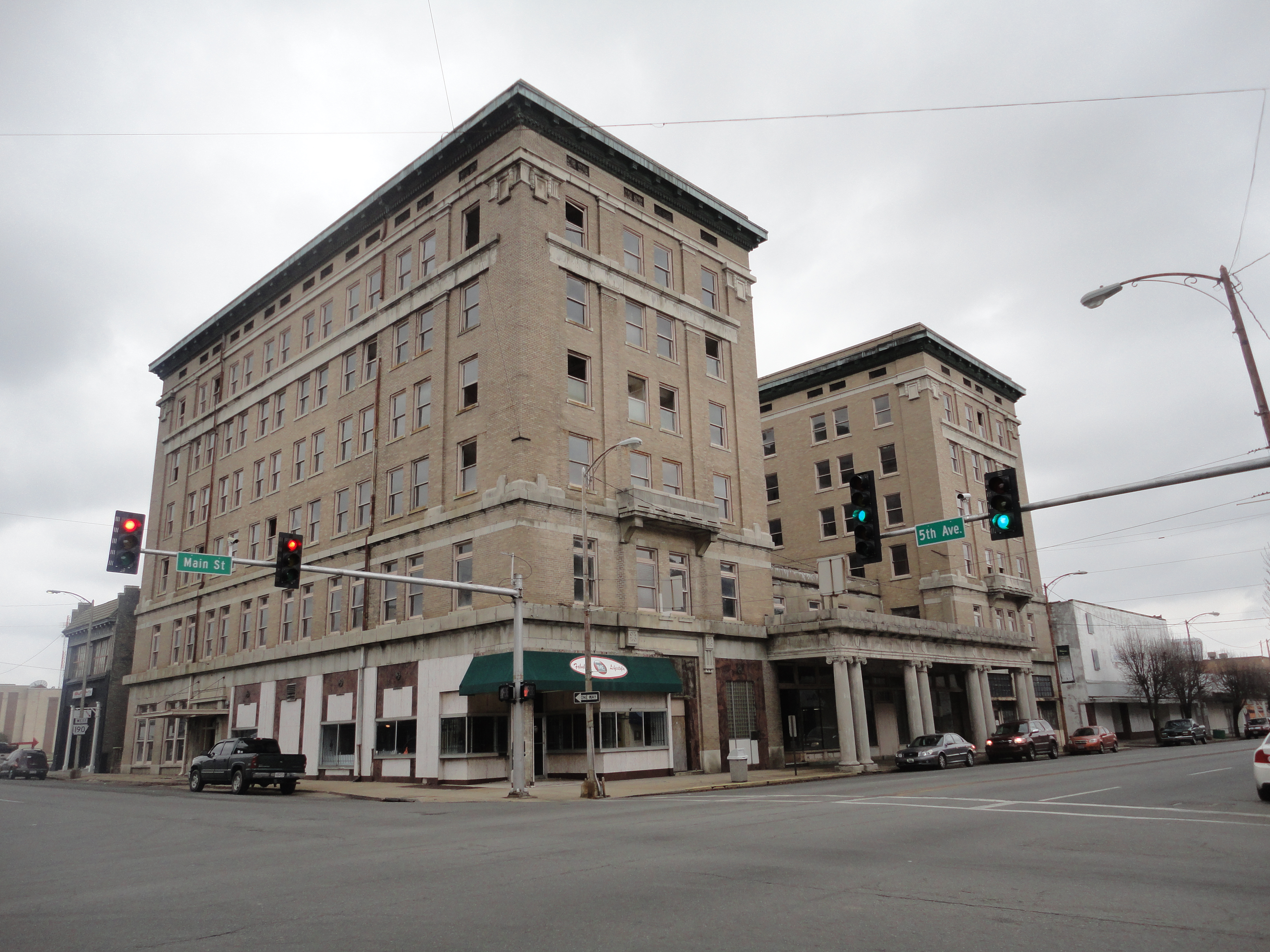

- Location within Arkansas Location within the United States
- Location: Main St. and W. 5th Ave., Pine Bluff, Arkansas
- Coordinates: 34°13′30″N 92°0′13″W
- Area: less than one acre
- Built: 1910
- Built by: Monk & Ritchie; E. L. Rogers Co (stonework)
- Architect: George R. Mann
- Part of: Pine Bluff Commercial Historic District (ID08000438)
- NRHP reference No.: 79000443

Significant dates
- Added to NRHP: August 10, 1979
- Designated CP: May 20, 2008

The Hotel Pines is a historic commercial building at the northwest corner of West 5th and Main Streets in Pine Bluff, Arkansas. It is a large six-story, U-shaped masonry structure, with a two-story section filling the center of the U. The center section has a portico projecting over the sidewalk, featuring Classical Revival detailing and paired columns for support. Built in 1913, it operated as a hotel until 1970 and was Pine Bluff's grandest hotel.

The building was listed on the National Register of Historic Places in 1979.

== See also ==
- National Register of Historic Places listings in Jefferson County, Arkansas
