= Community Theatre (Pine Bluff, Arkansas) =

Theater in Pine Bluff, Arkansas, United States

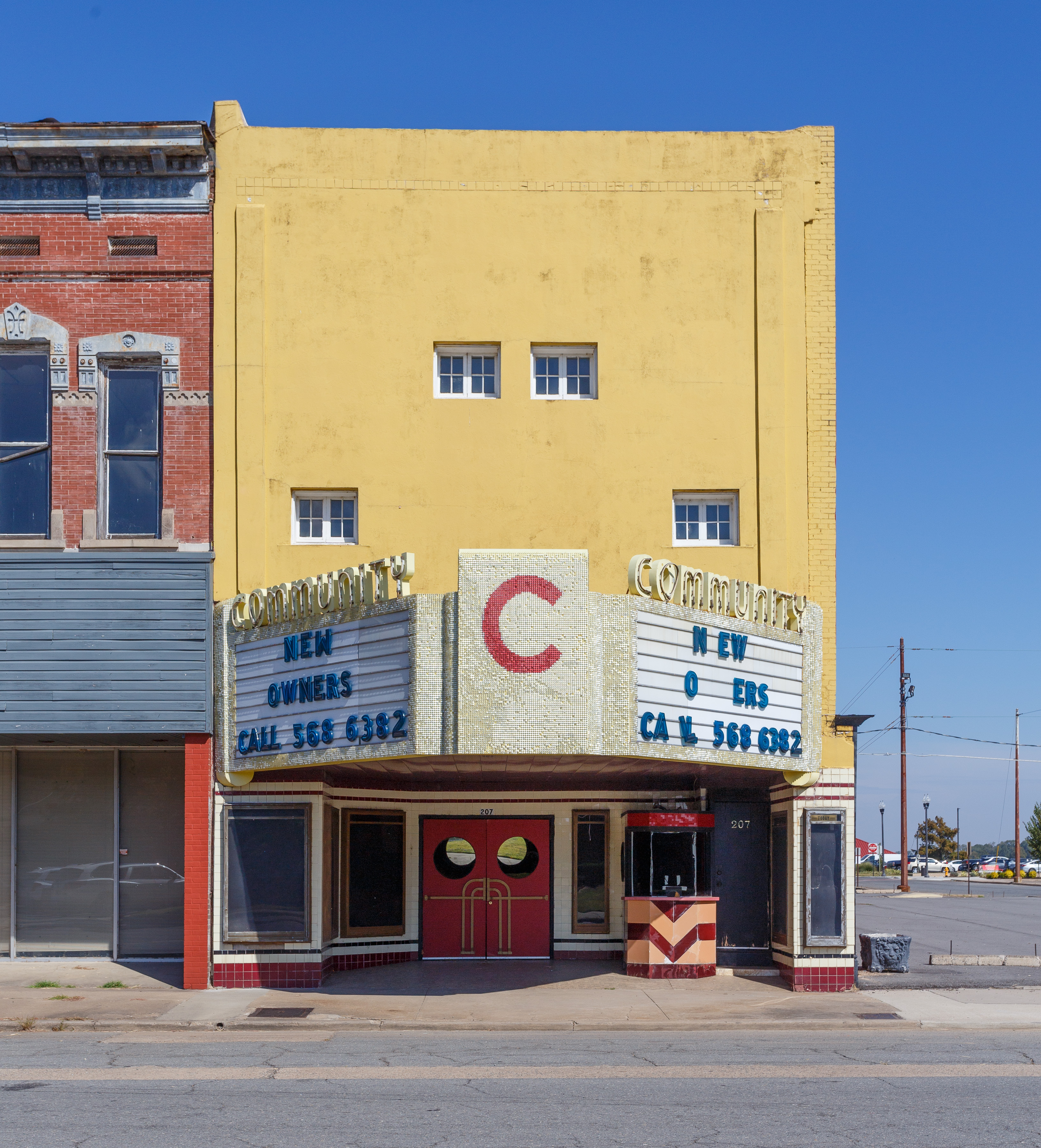
- View from West 2nd Avenue in 2022
- Interactive map of the Community Theatre area
- Former names: S. H. Kress & Co.; Un-Named Theater; Berbig-Community Theatre

General information
- Type: Theater
- Architectural style: Moderne
- Location: 207 W. 2nd Ave., Pine Bluff, Arkansas, United States
- Coordinates: 34°13′43.1″N 92°00′16.8″W
- Completed: 1889 (137 years ago)
- Renovated: 1920s, 1950s, 1990s

Technical details
- Material: Brick
- Floor count: 2

Design and construction
- Architect: Mitchell Seligman
- Main contractor: William I. Hilliard
- Community Theatre
- U.S. Historic district – Contributing property
- Part of: Pine Bluff Commercial Historic District (ID04000507)
- Added to NRHP: May 20, 2008

The Community Theatre is a historic theatre building at 207 West 2nd Avenue in Pine Bluff, Arkansas. It is a two-story brick building, finished in stucco, with Moderne styling. It was built in 1889, and housed first a furniture store, and then a five and dime, before being converted for theatrical use in the 1920s. Its present Moderne styling dates to renovations made in the wake of a 1951 fire.

The building was listed on the National Register of Historic Places in 2004.

== See also ==
- National Register of Historic Places listings in Jefferson County, Arkansas
