= Hestand Stadium =

Open-air stadium in Pine Bluff, Arkansas

Coordinates: 34°14′8″N 92°2′49″W

Hestand Stadium is a 7,000-seat covered open-air stadium located in Pine Bluff, Arkansas. It is the site of the annual Southeast Arkansas District Fair and Rodeo. The stadium contains 33,480 square feet (3,110 m^{2}) of field space. It is also used for other outdoor events.
