= Joseph Carter Corbin =

American journalist and educator (1833–1911)

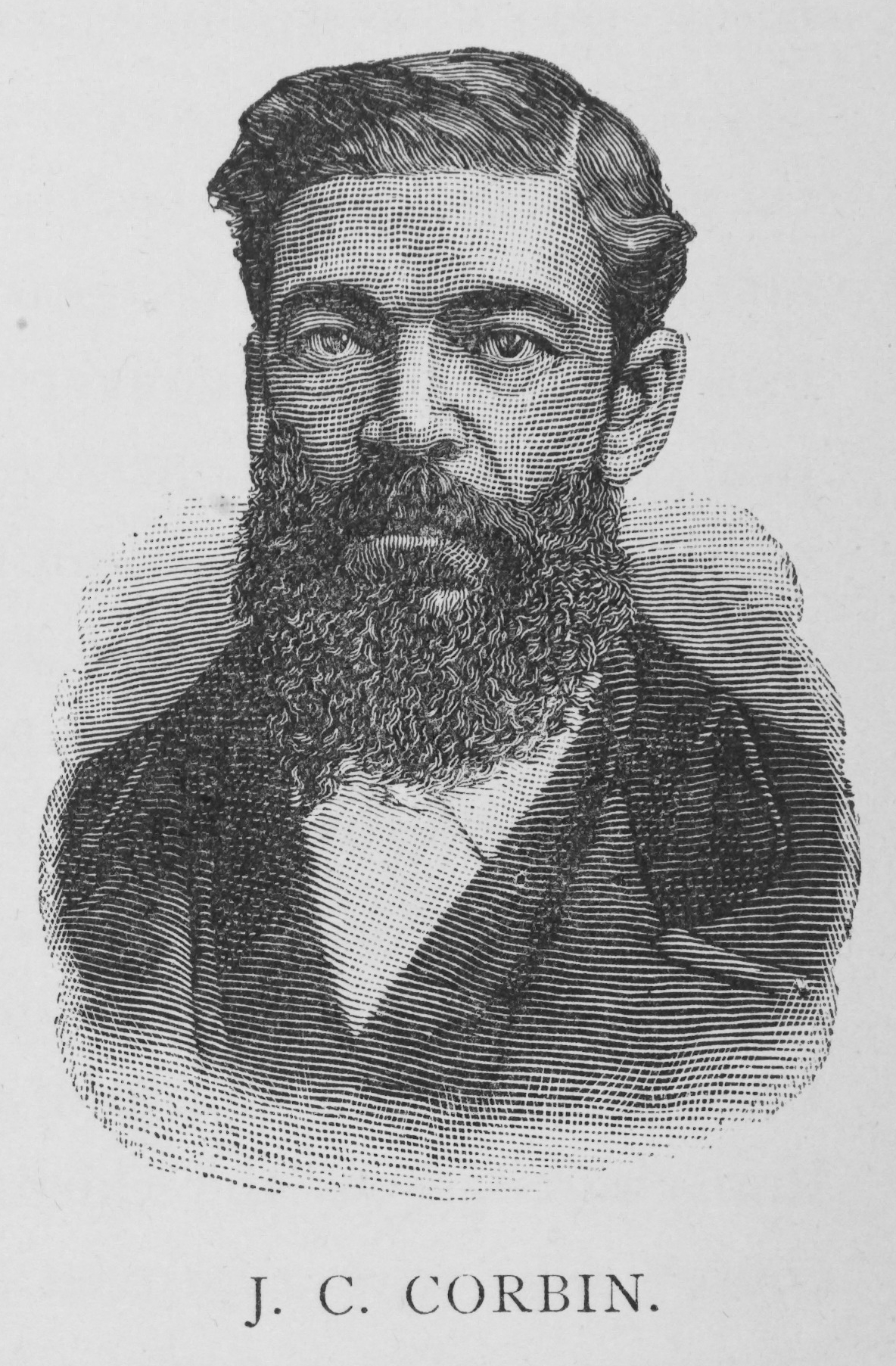
- Corbin in 1887
- Born: March 26, 1833; Chillicothe, Ohio, US
- Died: January 9, 1911 (aged 77); Pine Bluff, Arkansas, US
- Burial place: German Waldheim Cemetery
- Education: Ohio University
- Occupations: Educator, journalist
- Political party: Republican
- Relatives: Henry Adams (brother in-law), J.Q. Adams (nephew), Cyrus Field Adams (nephew)

Joseph Carter Corbin (March 26, 1833 – January 9, 1911) was an American journalist and educator. Before the abolition of slavery, he was a journalist, teacher, and conductor on the Underground Railroad in Ohio and Kentucky. After the American Civil War, he moved to Arkansas where he served as superintendent of public schools from 1873 to 1874. He founded the predecessor of University of Arkansas at Pine Bluff and was its first principal from 1875 until 1902. He ended his career in education spending a decade as principal of Merrill High School in Pine Bluff. He also taught in Missouri.

== Early life ==
Corbin was born on March 26, 1833, in Chillicothe, Ohio, to William and Susan Corbin. William and Susan were from Richmond, Virginia, where they were slaves before they moved to Chillicothe. Joseph was their eldest son, and he attended schools in Chillicothe where John Mercer Langston was a classmate. At the age of 15, he moved to Louisville, Kentucky, and taught in schools there as an assistant to Henry Adams, who would become his brother-in-law. After a few years he moved back to Ohio and attended Ohio University, where he graduated in 1853. He returned to Louisville where his father's family lived and took work as a clerk, first in a mercantile agency and then in a bank. He was also active in the Underground Railroad as a part of a circle involving John Patterson Sampson, S. W. C. Liverpool, John McLeod, and Louis D. Eastin.

During the American Civil War, Corbin edited and published the Colored Citizen in Cincinnati. At this time, he was a member of the "colored school board committee" with a number of local black leaders, including William Henry Harrison. Sometime after the war he was granted a A. M. and Ph.D. from his alma mater.

== Career ==
In 1872, Corbin was hired as a reporter for the Arkansas Daily Republican and moved to Arkansas. There he was appointed chief clerk of the Little Rock Post Office and in 1873 the state superintendent of public schools which he served for two years, defeating Thomas Smith for the position. By virtue of his position, he also served as the second president of the University of Arkansas Board of Trustees. While president, he signed the contract for the construction of the first permanent building at the University of Arkansas, Old Main, initially called University Hall. In 1873, with Corbin's urging, the legislature approved the creation of Branch Normal College at Pine Bluff, to be the black arm of the state university and later known as the University of Arkansas at Pine Bluff. Corbin was dismissed after Democratic takeover of government in the Brooks–Baxter War of 1874. He then taught at the Lincoln Institute in Jefferson City, Missouri, for two years.

== Branch Normal College ==
Corbin returned to Little Rock in 1875 at the request of Governor Augustus H. Garland and sent to Pine Bluff where he was to establish the Branch Normal College, as nothing had been done since the passing of the law authorizing its creation in 1873. Normal schools were designed to train teachers, and Corbin was very successful in his work. When the school opened that year, there were seven students, but enrollment grew to about 250 by 1887. From 1875 until 1883 he was the only teacher at the school. Corbin was principal of the school until 1902 and valued the schools commitment to the land-grant mission, although in the 1890s, against the wishes of Corbin, the school moved toward the Tuskegee model of industrial education advocated by Booker T. Washington.

=== Disputes ===
In 1891, after the Arkansas Legislature adopted provisions of the second Morrill Act, Corbin sought to have its measures implemented, in particular that if a state maintained separate white and black universities, funds should be "equitably divided", although equity was left for states to define. Corbin's efforts were partially successful. The legislature allocated $5,000 to open new programs in agriculture and mechanical arts and hired William S. Harris, a white employee of the Fayetteville University of Arkansas campus, to run the new programs. Corbin was not happy with the effort, because agriculture did not offer his students many opportunities for upward mobility.

In 1893, Corbin was investigated due to rumors of poor performance and was recommended to be fired by the Democratic state legislature. This investigation was in contrast to another investigation in 1891 which found Corbin to be very successful and respected. It has been suggested that the negative report was related to Corbin's support of John M. Clayton in the hard-fought 1888 election campaigns. Clayton and Corbin were close friends, and Clayton was a brother to Powell Clayton, a politically powerful Republican who was opposed by the state Democratic politicians. The legislature was not authorized to remove Corbin, and the university's board of trustees decided to retain Corbin, but promoted Harris to Superintendent and Treasurer, putting Corbin in a subservient role. In 1895, Corbin accused Harris of seducing female students and the accusations were widely supported, but Corbin was unable to fire Harris who was supported by the board. Corbin's relationship with the board continued to decline and in June 1902, the board voted to replace him, appointing Tuskegee graduate and Booker T. Washington protégé, Isaac Fisher. Fisher was not supported by the community, who advocated for Corbin's return.

== Later career ==
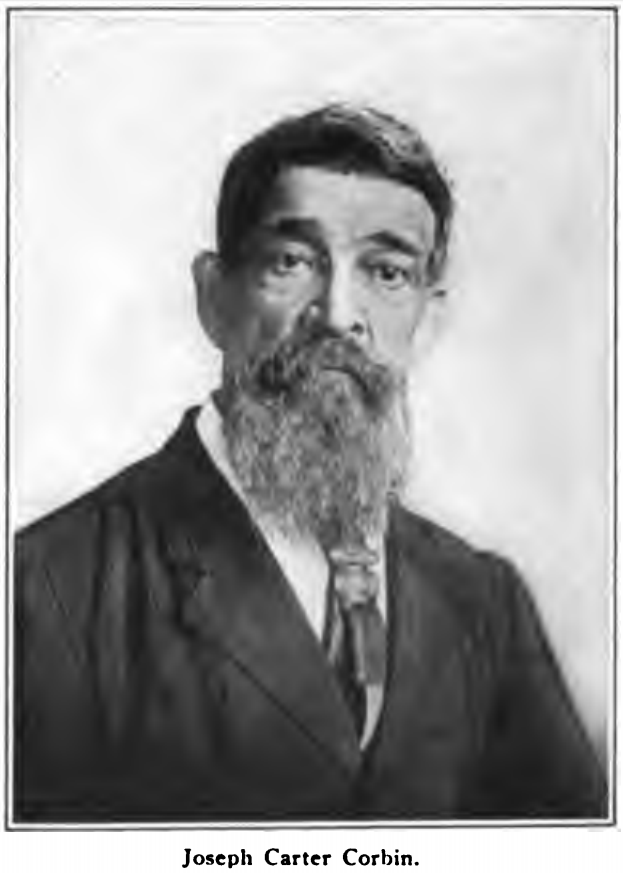
Corbin in 1910

After leaving the university, Corbin became principal of Merrill High School in Pine Bluff, serving from 1901 to 1911. During this tenure, he worked with R. C. Childress to found the Arkansas Teachers Association.

Corbin was a Baptist and was superintendent of Sunday Schools in Pine Bluff for many years. In 1886, he was vice president of the Colored Industrial Fair Association associated with Wiley Jones. He was also a prominent member of the Freemasons, an accomplished musician, and published mathematical writings in a number of mathematical education journals. He was Third State Grand Master of the Prince Hall Freemasons of Arkansas from 1878 to 1881. In 1903, he was a primary force in the building of a new Masonic temple in Pine Bluff.

== Personal life and death ==
Corbin married Mary J. Ward of Kentucky on September 11, 1866, in Cincinnati, Ohio, and the couple had six children. Corbin's sister, Margaret, married Henry Adams. Their son, John Quincy Adams, was a journalist and publisher of The Appeal. In the early 1870s, John Q. Adams taught as an assistant to Corbin.

Corbin died in on January 9, 1911, aged 77, in Pine Bluff, Arkansas. He was buried in the German Waldheim Cemetery (now part of Forest Home Cemetery), in Forest Park, Illinois, where his wife and son William had previously been interred. Corbin owned land in South Side, Chicago, and in 1909, had acquired a plot of six graves for $500 at German Waldheim, because it did not have segregated gravesites. In 2013, the Arkansas Black History Commission, as well as a group of alumni and supporters of the University of Arkansas at Pine Bluff, dedicated a stone at Corbin's gravesite, honoring his pioneering contributions to African American education.

== Sources ==
- Gordon, Fon Louise. Caste and Class: The Black Experience in Arkansas, 1880-1920. University of Georgia Press, 2007.
