= Friendship Aspire =

Charter school network in Arkansas, United States

Friendship Public Charter School, Inc. is a network of charter schools in Arkansas. Friendship Education Foundation has an office in Little Rock, Arkansas and another office in Washington, DC.

== History ==
In 1998 the network was first established.

It formerly had three charter school districts recognized under Arkansas law: Friendship Aspire Little Rock, Friendship Aspire Pine Bluff, and Friendship Aspire Southeast Pine Bluff. They were merged into a single school district effective 2022 in an effort to reduce bureaucratic issues. The names of the campuses changed after the merger occurred.

== Schools ==
Little Rock:

- 6-8: Friendship Aspire Academy Little Rock Middle School
- K-4: Friendship Aspire Academy Little Rock Elementary a.k.a. Friendship Aspire Academy Garland

Pine Bluff:

- 5-8, 12: Friendship Aspire Academy Southeast Pine Bluff
- K-4: Friendship Aspire Academy Pine Bluff
- K-3: Friendship Aspire Academy Downtown Pine Bluff

The network wishes to establish a school in San Antonio, Texas.

=== Friendship Aspire Academy Southeast Pine Bluff ===
Friendship Aspire Academy Southeast Pine Bluff, formerly Friendship Aspire Academy Southeast Prep, Friendship Aspire Southeast Pine Bluff, and Southeast Arkansas Preparatory High School (SAPHS), is a charter secondary school in Pine Bluff. It opened in 2018, in the former Ridgway Christian School secondary school building. The Christian School director announced that the plans were to discontinue the high school program and to have a single K-8 campus. According to the president of the newly-established charter school, Pat Hart, the Ridgway Christian high school program encountered difficulty recruiting students. The anticipated enrollment was 220.

In the 2019-2020 school year, it initially had 107 students. In December 2019 the Arkansas Charter Authorizing Panel formally decided to ask the Arkansas Department of Education to close the school, arguing that the charter should be dissolved as the school had problems with too low academic performance and inability to manage money. By January 2020 it had 116 students. In March 2020 the Arkansas Board of Education decided that the school would remain in place.

The charter school group Friendship Aspire acquired control of the school, with its new name effective July 1, 2020. The charter school network decided to convert the school into middle school only, with existing students to graduate but with further high school enrollment blocked. In 2021 the school stopped serving the 10th grade, and in 2022 the school stopped serving the 11th grade.
