= Masonic Temple (Pine Bluff, Arkansas) =

- U.S. National Register of Historic Places
- U.S. Historic district – Contributing property
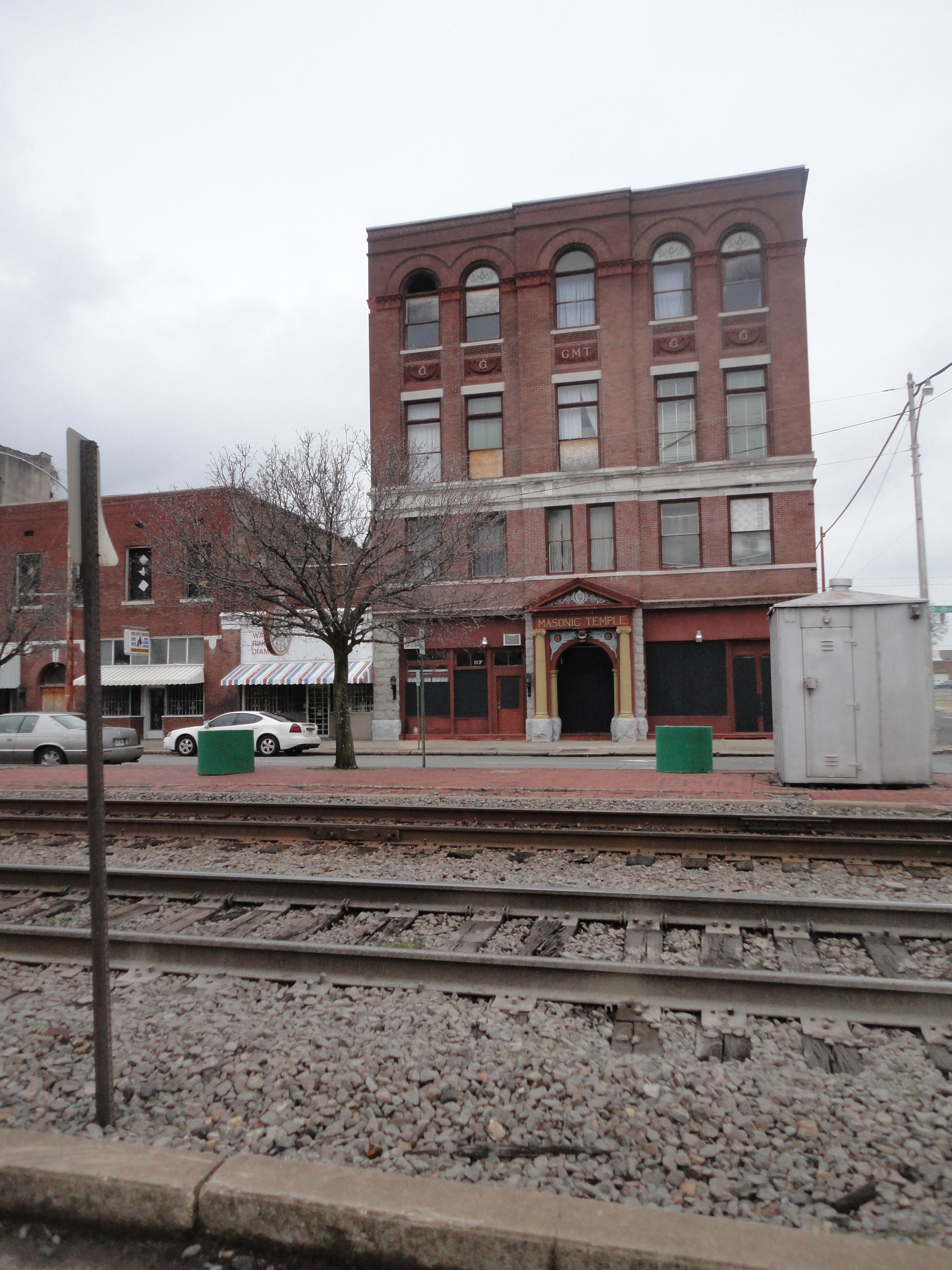

- Location within Arkansas Location within the United States
- Location: 4th and State St., Pine Bluff, Arkansas
- Coordinates: 34°13′35″N 92°0′9″W
- Area: 0.9 acres (0.36 ha)
- Built: 1902
- Architect: Gibbs & Sanders, W.S. Helton
- Part of: Pine Bluff Commercial Historic District (ID08000438)
- NRHP reference No.: 78000599

Significant dates
- Added to NRHP: November 30, 1978
- Designated CP: May 20, 2008

The Masonic Temple is a historic fraternal and commercial building at East Fourth Avenue and State Street in Pine Bluff, Arkansas. Fundraising for the building was led by Joseph Carter Corbin and J. N. Donohoo. It is a four-story brick building, built between 1902 and 1904 by the state's African-American Masonic lodge, the Sovereign Grand Lodge of Free and Accepted Masons. It was at the time Pine Bluff's tallest building; the ground floor held retail space, the second floor professional offices, and the upper floors were devoted to the Masonic organizations.

The building was listed on the National Register of Historic Places in 1978.

== See also ==
- National Register of Historic Places listings in Jefferson County, Arkansas
