= Merrill High School (Arkansas) =

Location
- Pine Bluff, Arkansas; U.S.
- Coordinates: 34.23095°N 92.01540°W

Information
- Former name: Merrill Public School; Merrill Institute
- Type: Public
- School district: Pine Bluff School District
- Nickname: Pirates

Merrill High School was a public secondary school in Pine Bluff, Arkansas, operated by the Pine Bluff School District. It was one of four high schools that served black students in the Pine Bluff area until the public schools were integrated in 1971.

== History ==
Originally known as Merrill School, it was named for Joseph Merrill, a philanthropist from New Hampshire. In 1886 Merrill sold a two-story house and some adjoining land to the Pine Bluff School District, and donated money to African-Americans to remodel the house into a five room school.

Newspaper editor and publisher Jesse Duke was one of the people recruited to teach at Merrill School by Marion Rowlamd Perry Sr.

Part of the school later burned, and was restored by the Works Progress Administration in 1939.

Dollarway School District (DSD) sent older black students to Merrill High, as DSD did not have its own high school for either black or white students, until Townsend Park High School opened in 1955.

== Athletics ==
Merrill won back-to-back National Championships in Lamar Allen's freshman year of 1932 and again in 1933.

== Notable people ==
- Lamar "Buddy" Allen, baseball player, football player, coach
- Joseph Carter Corbin, an educator who served as the first principal of the University of Arkansas at Pine Bluff from 1875-1902. After he was fired in 1902 he became principal of Merrill
- Chris Mercer, the first African-American deputy state prosecutor in the South, one of the "six pioneers" who integrated the University of Arkansas Law School.
- Cleo Miller, professional football player
- Raye Montague, US Navy engineer, created first computer generated draft of a naval ship
