= St. Joseph Catholic School (Pine Bluff, Arkansas) =

Catholic school in Pine Bluff, Arkansas, United States

Location
- 1501 West 73rd Street; Pine Bluff, Jefferson County, Arkansas 71603; United States

Information
- School type: Catholic, Coeducational Parochial
- Religious affiliation: Roman Catholic
- Established: 1993
- Closed: 2013
- Principal: Alexandra Pritchett
- Head of school: Pastor of St. Joseph Catholic Church, Pine Bluff, AR.
- Chaplain: Fr. Warren Harvey
- Grades: 7–12
- Colors: Purple and Vegas gold
- Mascot: Husky

St. Joseph Catholic School was a private, Roman Catholic grade 5-12 middle and high school in Pine Bluff, Arkansas.

== History ==
The school opened with grades 7-8 in August 1993. Its high school division opened in 1999. With its first graduating class in 2002, its high school division was the newest high school in the Roman Catholic Diocese of Little Rock. The final building, on 30 acres (12 ha) of land, was developed from a fundraising program that began in 1999, and resulted in a campus completed in 2000. The party that arranged to have the building established was the Pine Bluff Educational Endowment (PBEE), which leased its building to St. Joseph; PBEE had requested that its property host a Catholic school.

Originally the St. Joseph Church subsidized and managed the school. By May 2012 the church was less able to give subsidies, so the Roman Catholic Diocese of Little Rock Office of Catholic Schools took over management duties. The school was going to close in 2012 but Anthony B. Taylor, the bishop of the diocese, gave a clemency of one year. Taylor did so after the community raised $38,505 as part of the "Save St. Joseph School" campaign. Alexandra Pritchett became the principal in 2012.

The school announced it was closing in March 2013 due to lack of enrollment; only 42 students had pre-registered for the 2013-2014 school year. The school had calculated what would have been necessary to save it as part of a feasibility study conducted in February 2013. 60 students would have been necessary to keep the school open, and if that was the case the school would have operated at a deficit of $144,000 after the subsequent school year. 100 students would have been necessary for complete financial viability. The school's finances were to have been drained by June 30, 2013 as it had $160,000 in reserve and the $38,000 originating from "Save St. Joseph School". The school held its final graduation on May 10, 2013 with five students graduating. The following school year Ridgway Christian School began leasing the former St. Joseph building for its secondary students. John Worthen of the Pine Bluff Commercial wrote that area Catholic schools were losing students as many who wanted private education came to Ridgway Christian instead. The school was the last Catholic school remaining in the county.

== Student body and staff ==
In 2006 the school had 109 students in grades 7-12. In 2013 the school had 44 students, including 42 students in grades 7-12, a decline by more than half of the previous figure. As of March 2013 the school had five students of the Roman Catholic faith, making up 12% of the student body.

In 2013 the school had eleven teachers and three others employees; the teachers included full-time and part-time teachers.
