= Ridgway Christian School =

Christian school in Arkansas, United States

Coordinates: 34.166971°N 92.035028°W

Ridgway Christian School (RCS) was a private K–12 Christian school in Pine Bluff, Arkansas. Pine Bluff First Assembly of God is the school's parent church. The 30-acre (12 ha) middle and high school campus was owned by the Pine Bluff Educational Endowment (PBEE); This campus was known as Ridgway Christian High School (RCHS).

== History ==
In August 1997 the school opened with five employees and 17 students. The First Assembly of God Church had created the school.

From 2007 to 2008 the net increase of students was around 20. In that same period 15 of them stopped attending the school since they moved outside of the Pine Bluff area, which reflected the economic issues in the Arkansas Delta region.

Ridgway Christian began leasing the current secondary school building in June 2013. St. Joseph Catholic School previously leased the building before its 2013 closure. John Worthen of the Pine Bluff Commercial wrote that area Catholic schools were losing students as many who wanted private education came to Ridgway Christian instead. Therefore, Ridgway Christian had two buildings: one primary (K-6) and one secondary (7-12).

As of 2013 the school's expected number of students was to be 500, including 120 in grades 7–12. In 2017 the school had about 300 students.

In 2018 the secondary campus was repurposed as a charter school, Southeast Arkansas Preparatory High School. The Christian School director announced that the plans were to discontinue the high school program and to have a single K-8 campus. According to the president of the newly established charter school, Pat Hart, the Ridgway Christian high school program encountered difficulty recruiting students.
