= Union Station (Pine Bluff, Arkansas) =

- U.S. National Register of Historic Places
- U.S. Historic district – Contributing property
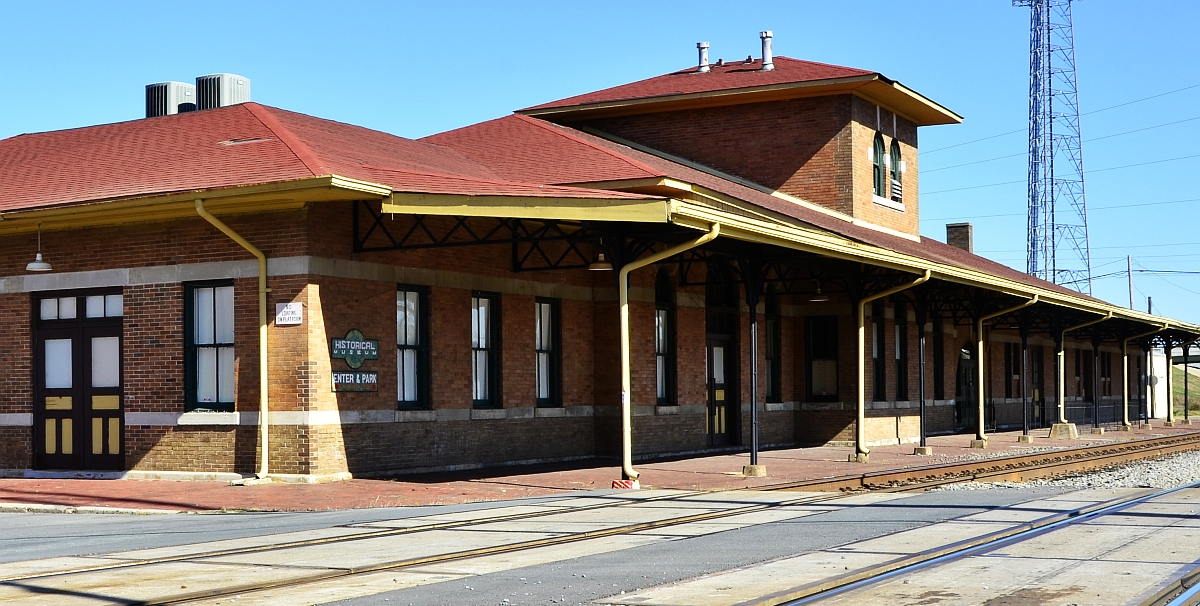
- Union Station (Pine Bluff, Arkansas)

- Location within Arkansas Location within the United States
- Location: E. 4th Ave. and State St., Pine Bluff, Arkansas
- Coordinates: 34°13′34″N 92°0′6″W
- Area: less than one acre
- Built: 1906
- Built by: Steininger, E.H.
- Architect: Gibbs & Sanders
- Part of: Pine Bluff Commercial Historic District (ID08000438)
- NRHP reference No.: 78000601

Significant dates
- Added to NRHP: December 14, 1978
- Designated CP: May 20, 2008

Union Station is a former railroad station at East 4th Ave. and State St. in Pine Bluff, Jefferson County, Arkansas. The station was originally at the union of the Cotton Belt and Iron Mountain railroads, and now houses the Pine Bluff/Jefferson County Historical Society museum. It is a single-story brick building, with a hip roof whose long eaves are supported by iron columns and half-truss brackets. The station was built in 1906 by the Iron Mountain Railroad. It had been a stop on the St. Louis Southwestern's Lone Star (Memphis-Dallas), and also on the railway's St. Louis-Dallas trains. Ownership reverted to the city in 1955.

The station was listed on the National Register of Historic Places in 1978.

Preceding station	Missouri Pacific Railroad	Following station
Farrell toward Little Rock	Little Rock – New Orleans	Noble Lake toward New Orleans
Preceding station	St. Louis Southwestern Railway	Following station
Rison toward Gatesville	Main Line	Rob Roy toward St. Louis

== See also ==
- National Register of Historic Places listings in Jefferson County, Arkansas
