= St. Peter's Catholic School (Pine Bluff, Arkansas) =

Location
- Pine Bluff, Arkansas; 34.2140572°N 92.0024974°W

Information
- Former name: Colored Industrial Institute (1889-1897); St. Peter Academy (1897-1975)
- Religious affiliation: Roman Catholic
- Founded: 1889
- Founder: John Michael "J.M." Lucey
- Closed: 1975
- Last updated: 29 December 2017

St. Peter's Catholic School (StPCS) was a Black Catholic school in Pine Bluff, Arkansas, in operation from 1889 through 1975 and 1985 through 2012.

== History ==
St. Peter's, the first school in Arkansas for black children to be established, was established in 1889 by St. Joseph Church Pastor Monsignor John Michael "J.M." Lucey as the Colored Industrial Institute and in 1897 became St. Peter Academy, a.k.a. St. Peter High School.

It was later staffed by both Fr John Henry Dorsey, SSJ, one of the first African-American Catholic priests in US history, as well as the Sisters of the Holy Family, the second-oldest order of Black Catholic nuns. The two clashed, however, leading to the Sisters' departure. Dorsey was later killed by a student's father.

Sandra Gordy, author of Finding the Lost Year: What Happened When Little Rock Closed Its Public Schools, stated that in the late 1950s the enrollment of St. Peter's was uneven from grade level to grade level, and that it was "small".

The elementary school division became racially integrated in early 1963.

The school closed in 1975, and reopened as an elementary school (Grades Preschool through 6) operated by the School Sisters of Notre Dame in 1985. It closed permanently in 2012. It was the last Catholic school established for black students in the state of Arkansas.
