= Pine Bluff Commercial Historic District =

Historic district in Arkansas, United States

- U.S. National Register of Historic Places
- U.S. Historic district
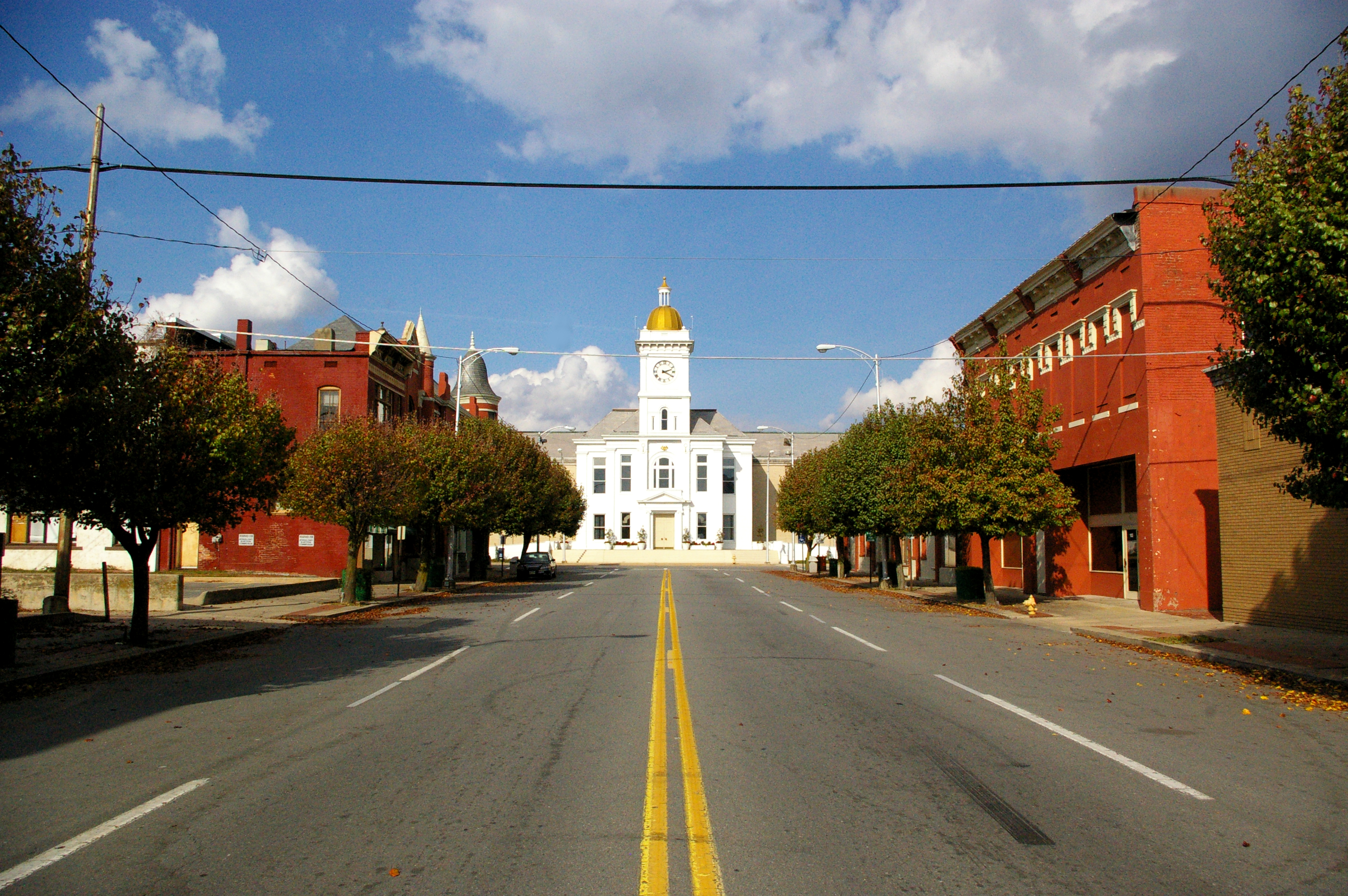

- Location within Arkansas Location within the United States
- Location: Roughly bounded by US 65B, Walnut St., 10th Ave. & S. Alabama St., Pine Bluff, Arkansas
- Coordinates: 34°13′18″N 92°0′11″W
- Area: 45 acres (18 ha)
- Built: 1850
- Architect: Charles L. Thompson et.al.
- Architectural style: Late Victorian, Early Commercial
- NRHP reference No.: 08000438
- Added to NRHP: May 20, 2008

The Pine Bluff Commercial Historic District encompasses a portion of the historic city center of Pine Bluff, Arkansas. It extends from Barraque Street south along Main Street, extending in places to properties alongside streets. The area's commercial development began about 1840, when the courthouse square was laid out at Barraque and Main, and proceeded through the early 20th century. Most of the commercial properties of the district were built between 1880 and 1910, and are reflective architecturally of late 19th-century commercial building styles.

The district was listed on the National Register of Historic Places in 2008. Properties previously listed on the Register and included in the district are the Merchants and Planters Bank Building, Union Station, the Community Theatre, the Masonic Temple, and the Hotel Pines.

== See also ==
- National Register of Historic Places listings in Jefferson County, Arkansas
