= Daily Republican (Arkansas) =

Newspaper in Little Rock, Arkansas

The Daily Republican, known as the Morning Republican from 1868 until 1872, was a Reconstruction era newspaper published in Little Rock, Arkansas from 1872 until 1876.

== History ==
It reported on Mark Twain's book Innocents Abroad. The paper ran an editorial about Indian affairs. Abolitionist Joseph Carter Corbin was a reporter at the paper before becoming the state's secretary of education. He also founded the predecessor of University of Arkansas at Pine Bluff. There was an Arkansas Democrat published in DeWitt, Arkansas from 1879 until 1882.

== See also ==
- List of newspapers in Arkansas
