= Chris Mercer (activist) =

American Civil Rights pioneer

Christopher Columbus "C.C." Mercer (March 27, 1924 – November 20, 2012) was an African-American attorney from Arkansas. He was one of the "six pioneers" who integrated the University of Arkansas Law School. As an attorney, he served as an NAACP field representative to advise Daisy Bates, who spearheaded the efforts of the Little Rock Nine who integrated Little Rock Central High School.

== Biography ==
Mercer was born in 1924 Pine Bluff, Arkansas, where he graduated from Merrill High School and AM&N college. He served as principal of Conway Training School in Menifee, Arkansas. In 1949, Mercer and George W. B. Haley entered the University of Arkansas School of Law at Fayetteville, one year after Silas Hunt became the first black student at a white southern University since reconstruction. Of the "six pioneers", he was the only one who did not serve in the army during World War II due to a medical condition, and therefore frequently had to spend time off school to earn the money to pay for his education, serving in various jobs including teaching math at Carver High School in Marked Tree. In 1954, Mercer passed the bar with the highest score in the state.

Mercer was the first African American in the South to serve as a deputy state prosecutor. He also served as a special judge in several municipal and circuit courts in Arkansas's Pulaski County. He practiced law for 58 years, frequently taking cases for clients with little of no means to pay for his services. In May 2011, he was awarded an honorary Doctor of Laws degree from the University of Arkansas, and in April 2012, he received the Silas Hunt Legacy Award.

In 1957, when Little Rock Central was integrated, Mercer served as an advisor to one of the nine black students, Daisy Bates.

Mercer died November 20, 2012, at the age of 88.
