= Raye Montague =

American naval engineer

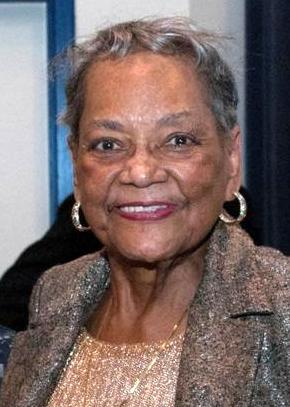
- Born: Raye Jean Jordan; January 21, 1935; Little Rock, Arkansas, US
- Died: October 10, 2018 (aged 83); Little Rock, Arkansas, US
- Occupation: Naval engineer

Raye Jean Montague (née Jordan; January 21, 1935 – October 10, 2018) was an American naval engineer credited with creating the first computer-generated rough draft of a U.S. naval ship. She was the first female program manager of ships in the United States Navy.

== Early life and education ==
Raye Jordan was born on January 21, 1935, to Rayford Jordan and Flossie Graves Jordan in Little Rock, Arkansas. She was inspired to pursue engineering after seeing a "midget" submarine, possibly the HA. 19, as a traveling exhibit that came to Little Rock.

She recalled, “My grandfather took me downtown to see that submarine and I was able to go down a little ladder into that sub. It was like a tin can. That was my first introduction to ships. You just never know what inspires a person.”

She graduated from Merrill High School in 1952. For college, she attended Arkansas Agricultural, Mechanical & Normal College (now University of Arkansas at Pine Bluff) and graduated in 1956 with a Bachelor of Science degree in business. At the time, the engineering program at the University of Arkansas did not admit African-American students.

== Career ==
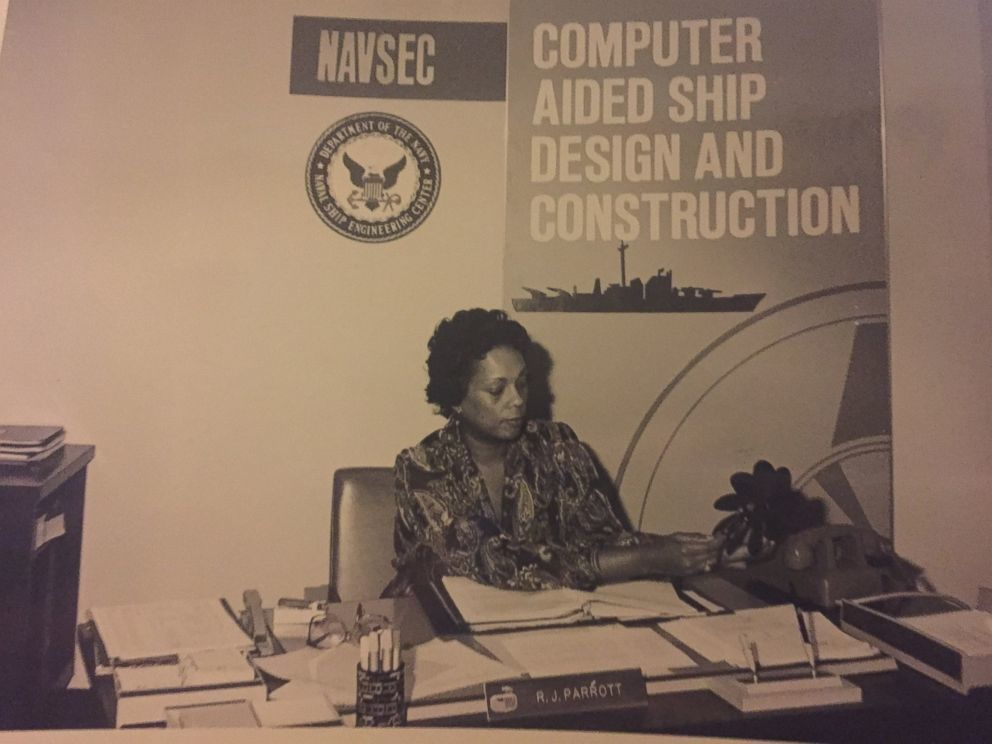
Raye Montague wrote a computer program that revolutionized US Naval ship design

Montague joined the United States Navy in 1956 in Washington, D.C., as a clerk typist. At work, she sat next to a 1950s UNIVAC I computer, watching the engineers operate it until one day, when all the engineers were sick, she jumped in to run the machine. She took computer programming at night school while continuing to work and learn the job. She was appointed as a computer systems analyst at the Naval Ship Engineering Center, and later served as the program director for the Naval Sea Systems Command (NAVSEA) Integrated Design, Manufacturing, and Maintenance Program, the division head for the Computer-Aided Design and Computer-Aided Manufacturing (CAD/CAM) Program, and deputy program manager of the Navy's Information Systems Improvement Program.

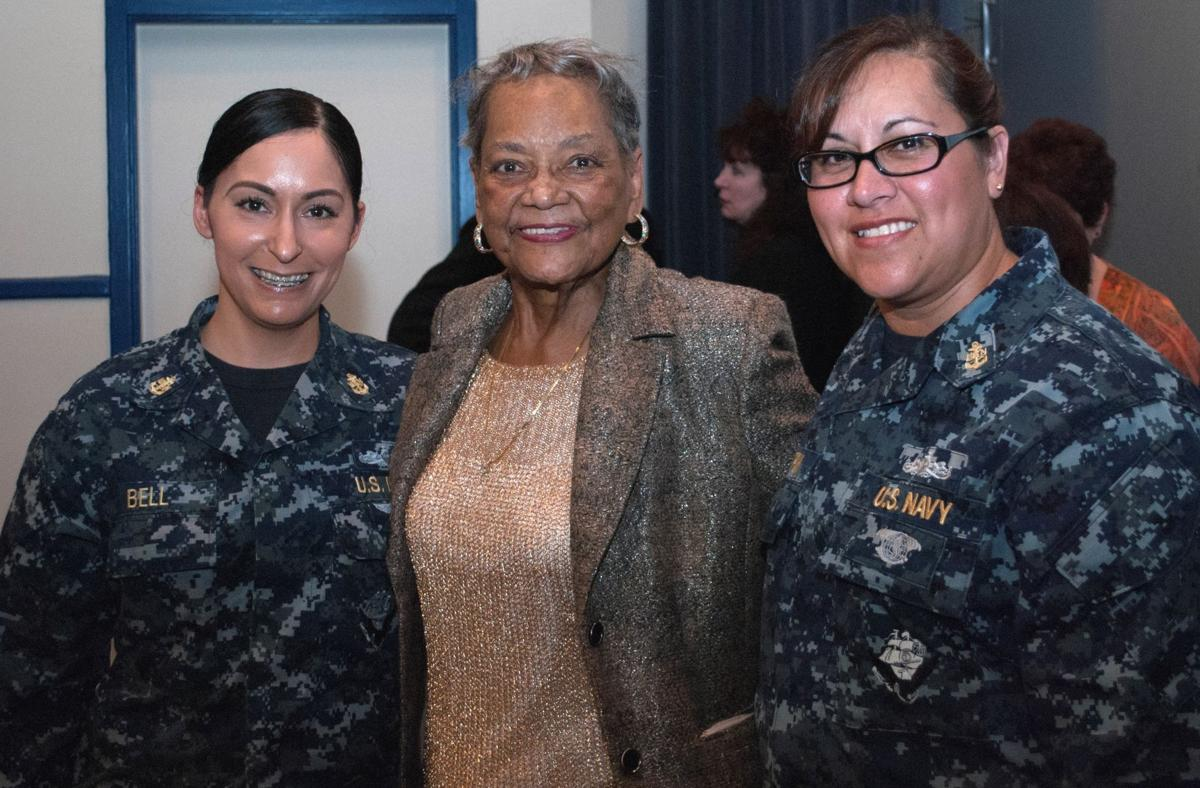
Raye Montague with sailors from Aegis Training and Readiness Center

In 1971, her department was allotted one month to create a computer-generated ship design. By modifying existing automated systems, Montague produced the initial draft for the Oliver Hazard Perry-class frigate in about 19 hours. With this accomplishment, she became the first person to design a ship using a computer system. She later worked on ships such as the Seawolf-class submarine and the Nimitz-class aircraft carrier Dwight D. Eisenhower. Montague retired in 1990.

Montague died of congestive heart failure on October 10, 2018, at Baptist Health Medical Center in Little Rock.

== Awards ==
- Meritorious Civilian Service Award (US Navy, 1972)
- Society of Manufacturing Engineers Achievement Award (1978)
- National Computer Graphics Association Award for the Advancement of Computer Graphics (1988)
- Arkansas Women's Hall of Fame (2018)
