= Pine Bluff, Arkansas =

City in Arkansas, United States

- City
- Downtown Pine Bluff

- Seal
- Motto: "City of Progress"
- Interactive map of Pine Bluff, Arkansas
- Location within Arkansas Location within the United States
- Coordinates: 34°13′42″N 92°00′00″W
- Country: United States
- State: Arkansas
- County: Jefferson
- Township: Vaugine
- Founded: October 16, 1832
- Incorporated: January 8, 1839

Government
  - Type: Mayor–Council
  - Mayor: Vivian L. Flowers (D)
  - Council: City Council

Area
  - Total: 46.38 sq mi (120.12 km^{2})
  - Land: 44.18 sq mi (114.43 km^{2})
  - Water: 2.20 sq mi (5.69 km^{2})
- Elevation: 226 ft (69 m)

Population (2020)
  - Total: 41,253
  - Estimate (2025): 38,213 ▼
  - Density: 934/sq mi (360.5/km^{2})
- Time zone: UTC−06:00 (CST)
  - Summer (DST): UTC−05:00 (CDT)
- ZIP code(s): 71601, 71602, 71603
- Area code(s): 870
- FIPS code: 05-55310
- GNIS feature ID: 2404520
- Major airport: Clinton National (LIT)
- Website: cityofpinebluff-ar.gov

Pine Bluff is a city in Jefferson County, Arkansas, United States, and its county seat. The population was 41,253 at the 2020 census, making it the tenth-most populous city in Arkansas.

Pine Bluff is situated in the southeast section of the Arkansas Delta and straddles the Arkansas Timberlands region to its west. Its topography is flat with wide expanses of farmland, similar to other places in the Delta Lowlands. Pine Bluff has numerous creeks, streams, and bayous, including Bayou Bartholomew, the longest bayou in the world and the second most ecologically diverse stream in the United States. Large bodies of water include Lake Pine Bluff, Lake Langhofer (Slack Water Harbor), and the Arkansas River.

== History ==
=== Indigenous Peoples, European Settlement and Quapaw Cession ===
The area along the Arkansas River had been inhabited for thousands of years by indigenous peoples of various cultures. They used the river for transportation as did European settlers after them, and for fishing. By the time of encounter with Europeans, the historical Quapaw were the chief people in the area, having migrated from the Ohio River valley centuries before.

Records dating back to 1801 show that “fifty miles up the Arkansas River on the Bonne Reserve lived Joseph Bonne, Michael Bonne and other taxpayers named Bonne.” Joseph Bonne was interpreter for the United States government at the signing of the Quapaw Cession at St. Louis, Missouri, August 21, 1818. Joseph Bonne, also written as Bone, Bona, or Bon. Bonne had Quapaw, French, and Plains Apache ancestry.

Due to a great flood in 1819, Bonne and his wife, Mary Imbeau, moved five miles upstream from the Bonne Reserve to the place later named Pine Bluff. This was the first bluff above the mouth of the river and was covered by towering pine trees, the eastern boundary of the coastal plain of South Arkansas.

=== Founding, Trail of Tears and the Antebellum Era (1832–1861) ===
Bonne built a log cabin with a lean-to which served as his home... as well as a tavern with lodging accommodations for travelers. The settlement was officially named “The Town of Pine Bluff” by the county court on October 16, 1832.

With its proximity to the Arkansas River, the town served as an inland port for steamboat travel and shipping. Steamboats provided the primary mode of transport, arriving from downriver ports such as New Orleans. From 1832 to 1838, Pine Bluff residents would see Native American migrants on the Trail of Tears waterway who were being forcibly removed by the United States Army from the Southeast to the Indian Territory west of the Mississippi River.

From 1832 to 1858, the town was a station on the Trail of Tears for the Seminole and their slaves, who were forcibly removed from Florida Territory to the Indian Territory. They included the legendary Black Seminole leader John Horse, who arrived in the city via the steamboat Swan in 1842.

=== Civil War, Reconstruction and the Gilded Age (1861–1902) ===
Pine Bluff was prospering by the outbreak of the Civil War; most of its wealth was based on the commodity crop of cotton. This was cultivated on large plantations by hundreds of thousands of enslaved Africans throughout the state, but especially in the Delta. The city had one of the largest slave populations in the state by 1860, and Jefferson County, Arkansas was second in cotton production in the state.

When Federal forces occupied Little Rock, a group of Pine Bluff residents asked commanding Major General Frederick Steele to send Federal forces to occupy their town to protect them from bands of Confederate bushwhackers. Federal troops under Colonel Powell Clayton arrived September 17, 1863, and stayed until the war was over.

On October 25, 1863, Confederate cavalry, led by Brigadier-General John S. Marmaduke, attempted to expel Federal occupation forces commanded by Colonel Powell Clayton; but were defeated by a combined force of federal troops and freedmen (former slaves freed by U.S. President Abraham Lincoln's recent Emancipation Proclamation) near Jefferson Court-House. In the final year of the Civil War, the 1st Kansas Colored Infantry Regiment (composed primarily of escaped slaves from Arkansas and Missouri), was the first regiment of U.S. Colored Troops to see combat. It was dispatched to guard Pine Bluff and eventually mustered out there.

Because of the Federal forces, Pine Bluff attracted many refugees and freedmen after the Emancipation Proclamation was issued in early 1863. The Federal troops set up a contraband camp there to house the runaway slaves and refugees behind Confederate lines. After the war, freed slaves worked with the American Missionary Association to start schools for the education of blacks, who had been prohibited from learning to read and write by southern laws. Both adults and children eagerly started learning. By September 1872, Professor Joseph C. Corbin opened the Branch Normal School of the Arkansas Industrial University, a historically black college. Founded as Arkansas's first black public college, today it is the University of Arkansas at Pine Bluff.

Pine Bluff and the region suffered lasting effects from defeat, the aftermath of war, and the trauma of slavery and exploitation. Recovery was slow at first. Construction of railroads improved access to markets, and with increased production of cotton as more plantations were reactivated, the economy began to recover. The first railroad reached Pine Bluff in December 1873. This same year Pine Bluff's first utility was formed when Pine Bluff Gas Company began furnishing manufactured gas from coke fuel for lighting purposes. The state's economy remained highly dependent on cotton and agriculture, which suffered a decline through the 19th century.

As personal fortunes increased from the 1870s onward, community leaders constructed large Victorian-style homes west of Main Street. Meanwhile, the Reconstruction era of the 1870s brought a stark mix of progress and challenge for African Americans. Most blacks joined the Republican Party, and several were elected in Pine Bluff to county offices and the state legislature for the first time in history. Several black-owned businesses were also opened, including banks, bars, barbershops, and other establishments. But in postwar violence in 1866, an altercation with whites ensued at a refugee camp, and 24 black men, women and children were found hanging from trees in one of the worst mass lynchings in U.S. history.

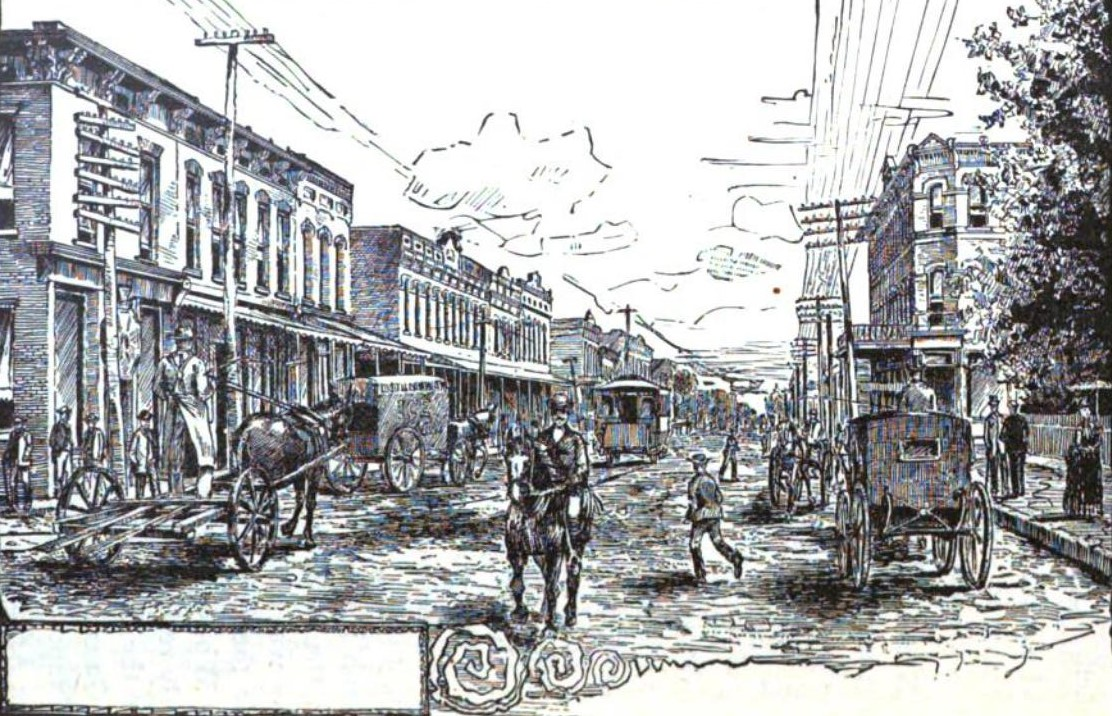
Pine Bluff c. 1890

The rate of lynchings of black males was high across the South during this period of social tensions and white resistance to Reconstruction. Armistad Johnson was lynched in 1889, and John Kelly and Gulbert Harris in 1892 in front of the Jefferson County Courthouse, after a mob of hundreds rapidly escalated to thousands of whites vehemently demanding execution, despite Kelly's pleas of innocence and lack of trial. The angry mob eventually forced over his custody from an Officer adamantly attempting to deliver the suspect to the jail house, then the crowd watched enthusiastically as he was hung and riddled with bullets. That same year the state adopted a poll tax amendment that disenfranchised many African-American and poor white voters. The Election Law of 1891 had already made voting more difficult and also caused voter rolls to decrease. With the Democratic Party consolidating its power in what became a one-party state, the atmosphere was grim toward the end of the 19th century for many African Americans. Democrats imposed legal segregation and other Jim Crow laws.

Bishop Henry McNeal Turner's "Back to Africa" movement attracted numbers of local African-American residents who purchased tickets and/or sought information on emigration. Arkansas had 650 emigrants depart to the colony of Liberia in West Africa, more than from any other state in the United States. The majority of these emigrants came from the black-majority Jefferson, St. Francis, Pulaski, Pope, and Conway counties.

According to historian James Leslie, Pine Bluff entered its "Golden Era" in the 1880s. Cotton production and river commerce helped the city draw industries, public institutions and residents to the area, making it by 1890 the state's third-largest city. The first telephone system was placed in service March 31, 1883. Wiley Jones, a freedman who achieved wealth by his own business, built the first mule-drawn, street-car line in October 1886. The first light, power and water plant was completed in 1887; a more dependable light and water system was put in place in 1912. Throughout the 1880s and 1890s, economic expansion was also fueled by the growing lumber industry in the region.

=== Early 20th century and the Great Depression (1902–1941) ===
Situated on the Arkansas River, Pine Bluff depended on river traffic and trade. Community leaders were concerned that the main channel would leave the city. The United States Army Corps of Engineers built a levee opposite Pine Bluff to try to keep the river flowing by the city.

During a later flood, the main channel of the river moved away from the city, leaving a small oxbow lake (later expanded into Lake Pine Bluff). River traffic diminished, even as the river was a barrier separating one part of the county from the other. After many years of regional haggling, because the bond issue involved raised taxes, the county built the Free Bridge, which opened in 1914. For the first time, it united the county on a permanent basis.

African Americans in Pine Bluff were damaged by the state's disfranchisement in 1891–1892 and exclusion from the political system. But they continued to work for their rights; they joined activists in Little Rock and Hot Springs in a sustained boycott of streetcars, protesting passage in 1903 of the Segregated Streetcar Act, part of a series of Jim Crow laws passed by the white-dominated legislature. They did not achieve change then.

Development in the city's business district grew rapidly. The Masonic Lodge, built by and for the African-American chapter in the city, was the tallest building in Pine Bluff when completed in 1904. The Hotel Pines, constructed in 1912, had an intricate marble interior and classical design, and was considered one of Arkansas' showcase hotels. The 1,500-seat Saenger Theater, built in 1924, was one of the largest such facilities in the state; it operated the state's largest pipe organ. When Dollarway Road was completed in 1914, it was the longest continuous stretch of concrete road in the United States. The first radio station (WOK) broadcast in Arkansas occurred in Pine Bluff on February 18, 1922.

Two natural disasters had devastating effects on the area's economy. The first was the Great Flood of 1927, a 100-year flood. Due to levee breaks, most of northern and southeastern Jefferson County were flooded. The severe drought of 1930 caused another failure of crops, adding to the problems of economic conditions during the Great Depression. Pine Bluff residents scrambled to survive. In 1930, two of the larger banks failed. During the 1933 Mississippi River flood, country singer Johnny Cash evacuated to Pine Bluff.

The state's highway construction program in the later 1920s and early 1930s, facilitating trade between Pine Bluff and other communities throughout southeast Arkansas, was critical to Jefferson County, too. After the inauguration of President Franklin D. Roosevelt in 1933, he launched many government programs to benefit local communities. Through the Works Progress Administration (WPA) and public works funding, Pine Bluff built new schools and a football stadium, and developed Oakland Park as its first major recreation facility. To encourage diversification in agriculture, the county built a stockyard in 1936 to serve as a sales outlet for farmers' livestock.

From 1936 to 1938, the WPA through the Federal Writers' Project initiated a project to collect and publish oral histories of former slaves. Writers were sent throughout the South to interview former slaves, most of whom had been children before the Civil War. When the project was complete, Arkansas residents had contributed more oral slave histories (approximately 780) than any other state, although Arkansas' slave population was less than those of neighboring Deep South states. African-American residents of Pine Bluff/Jefferson County contributed more oral interviews of Arkansas-born slaves than any other city/county in the state. The city served to compile a valuable storehouse of oral slave narrative material.

=== World War II and the Cold War (1941–1991) ===
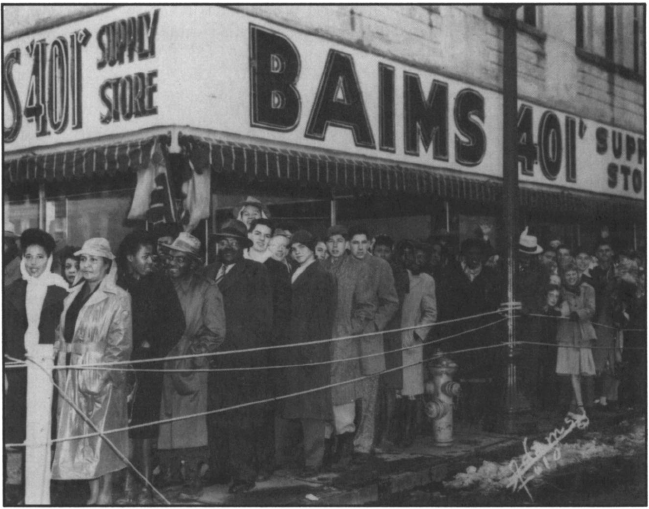
Mixed-race line of Freedom Train visitors waiting in line two hours before the exhibition opened, January 1948

World War II brought profound changes to Pine Bluff and its agriculture, timber and railroad-oriented economy. The Army built Grider Field Airport which housed the Pine Bluff School of Aviation and furnished flight training for air cadets for the Army Air Corps. At one time 275 aircraft were being used to train 758 pilots. Approximately 9,000 pilots had been trained by the time the school closed in October 1944.

The Army broke ground for the Pine Bluff Arsenal on December 2, 1941, on 15,000 acres (61 km^{2}) bought north of the city. The arsenal and Grider Field changed Pine Bluff to a more diversified economy with a mixture of industry and agriculture. The addition of small companies to the industrial base helped the economy remain steady in the late 1940s. Defense spending in association with the Korean War was a stabilizing factor after 1950.

In 1957, Richard Anderson announced the construction of a kraft paper mill north of the city. International Paper Co. shortly afterward bought a plant site five miles east of Pine Bluff. Residential developments followed for expected workers. The next year young minister Martin Luther King Jr. addressed students at the commencement program for Arkansas AM&N College (now the University of Arkansas at Pine Bluff).

The decade of the 1960s brought heightened activism in the civil rights movement: through boycotts and demonstrations, African Americans demanded an end to segregated public facilities and jobs. Whites responded with violence, attacking demonstrators, and bombing a black church in Pine Bluff in 1963. Some civil rights demonstrators were shot. Local leaders worked tirelessly, at times enlisting the support of national figures such as Dick Gregory and Stokely Carmichael, to help bring about change over the period. Voter registration drives that enabled increased black political participation, selective buying campaigns, student protests, and a desire among white local business leaders to avoid damaging negative media portrayals in the national media led to reforms in public accommodations.

During the 1960s and 1970s, major construction projects in the region included private and public sponsors: Jefferson Hospital (now Jefferson Regional Medical Center), the dams of the McClellan-Kerr Navigation System on the Arkansas River (which was diverted from the city to create Lake Langhofer), a Federal building, the Pine Bluff Convention Center complex including The Royal Arkansas Hotel & Suites, Pine Bluff Regional Park, two industrial parks and several large churches.

The Pines Mall, a 347,869-square-foot (32,318.1 m^{2}) enclosed shopping mall, opened in 1986. The mall closed in 2020, and fire damaged the vacant property in 2022.

The 1980s and 1990s brought a number of significant construction projects. Benny Scallion Park was created, named for the alderman who brought a Japanese garden to the Pine Bluff Civic Center. The city has not maintained the garden, but a small plaque remains. In the late 1980s, The Pines, the first large, enclosed shopping center, was constructed on the east side of the city. The mall attracted increased shopping traffic from southeast Arkansas.

=== Contemporary (1991–present) ===
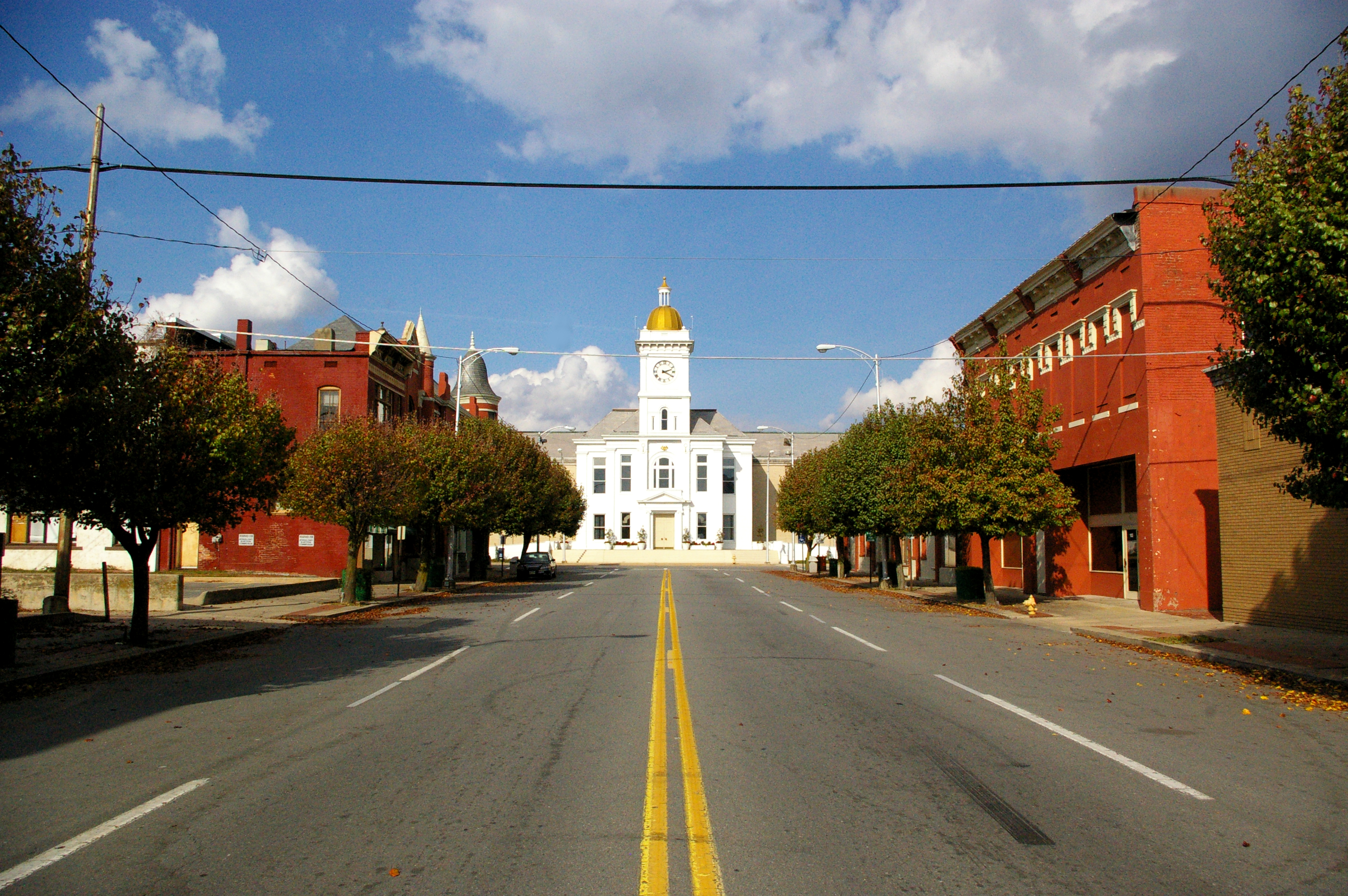
Looking north along Main Street

The most important construction project of the 1990s was completion of a southern bypass, designated part of Interstate 530. In addition, a highway and bridge across Lock and Dam #4 were completed, providing another link between farm areas in northeastern Jefferson County and the transportation system radiating from Pine Bluff. Through a private matching grant, a multimillion-dollar Arts and Science Center for Southeast Arkansas was completed downtown in 1994.

In 2000, construction was completed on the 43,000-square-foot (4,000 m^{2}) Donald W. Reynolds Community Services Center. Carl Redus became the first African American mayor in the city's history in 2005. The University of Arkansas at Pine Bluff recently opened a $3 million business incubator in downtown Pine Bluff. Also, a new $2 million farmers market pavilion was opened in 2010 on Lake Pine Bluff in downtown Pine Bluff.

Shirley Washington was elected as the first female African American mayor. She was elected in 2016.

== Geography ==
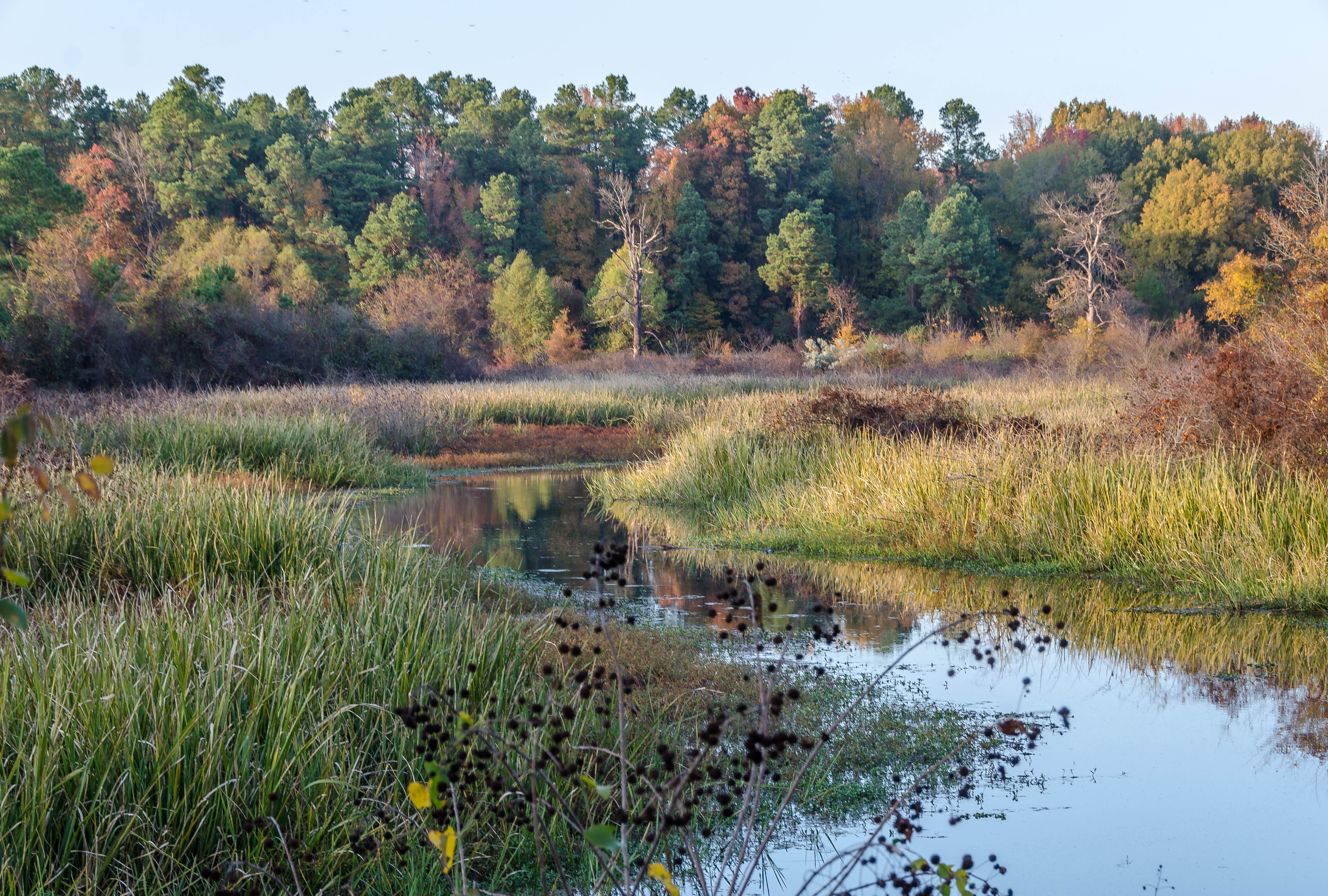
Bayou Bartholomew

Pine Bluff is on the Arkansas River; the community was named for a bluff along that river. Both Lake Pine Bluff and Lake Langhofer are situated within the city limits, as these are bodies of water which are remnants of the historical Arkansas River channel. (The former is a man-made expansion of a natural oxbow; the latter was created by diking the old channel after a man-made diversion.) Consequently, the Mississippi Alluvial Plain (or the Arkansas Delta) runs well into the city with Bayou Bartholomew picking up the western border as a line of demarcation between the Arkansas Delta and the Arkansas Timberlands.

A series of levees and dams surrounds the area to provide for flood control and protect from channel shift. One of the world's longest individual levees at 380 miles runs from Pine Bluff to Venice, Louisiana.

=== Micropolitan statistical area ===
Pine Bluff is the largest city in a two-county micropolitan statistical area (μSA) as defined by the U.S. Census Bureau including Jefferson and Cleveland counties, with an estimated population of 71,039 in 2023. The Pine Bluff area is also a component of the Little Rock-North Little Rock-Pine Bluff Combined Statistical Area which had a population of 913,536 people in the 2023 U.S. census estimate.

=== Climate ===
According to the United States Census Bureau, the city has a total area of 46.8 square miles (121 km^{2}), of which 45.6 square miles (118 km^{2}) is land and 1.2 square miles (3.1 km^{2}), or 2.65%, is water.

Climate data for Pine Bluff, Arkansas (1991–2020 normals, extremes 1884–present)
Month	Jan	Feb	Mar	Apr	May	Jun	Jul	Aug	Sep	Oct	Nov	Dec	Year
Record high °F (°C)	83 (28)	91 (33)	96 (36)	94 (34)	100 (38)	107 (42)	110 (43)	112 (44)	110 (43)	100 (38)	88 (31)	84 (29)	112 (44)
Mean maximum °F (°C)	72.4 (22.4)	75.9 (24.4)	82.3 (27.9)	86.4 (30.2)	91.0 (32.8)	95.5 (35.3)	98.8 (37.1)	98.9 (37.2)	95.7 (35.4)	89.3 (31.8)	79.7 (26.5)	73.2 (22.9)	100.4 (38.0)
Mean daily maximum °F (°C)	51.7 (10.9)	56.1 (13.4)	64.5 (18.1)	73.8 (23.2)	81.5 (27.5)	88.5 (31.4)	91.8 (33.2)	91.4 (33.0)	85.9 (29.9)	75.5 (24.2)	63.4 (17.4)	54.5 (12.5)	73.2 (22.9)
Daily mean °F (°C)	42.5 (5.8)	46.1 (7.8)	54.1 (12.3)	63.0 (17.2)	71.5 (21.9)	79.0 (26.1)	82.4 (28.0)	81.7 (27.6)	75.5 (24.2)	64.1 (17.8)	52.9 (11.6)	45.0 (7.2)	63.2 (17.3)
Mean daily minimum °F (°C)	33.2 (0.7)	36.0 (2.2)	43.7 (6.5)	52.1 (11.2)	61.6 (16.4)	69.6 (20.9)	73.0 (22.8)	71.9 (22.2)	65.1 (18.4)	52.7 (11.5)	42.3 (5.7)	35.5 (1.9)	53.1 (11.7)
Mean minimum °F (°C)	18.5 (−7.5)	23.1 (−4.9)	28.0 (−2.2)	37.4 (3.0)	48.6 (9.2)	60.6 (15.9)	65.2 (18.4)	63.5 (17.5)	49.9 (9.9)	36.5 (2.5)	27.3 (−2.6)	22.9 (−5.1)	16.3 (−8.7)
Record low °F (°C)	−6 (−21)	−5 (−21)	11 (−12)	29 (−2)	36 (2)	41 (5)	55 (13)	52 (11)	36 (2)	25 (−4)	14 (−10)	1 (−17)	−6 (−21)
Average precipitation inches (mm)	4.06 (103)	4.38 (111)	5.36 (136)	5.65 (144)	5.10 (130)	3.48 (88)	3.75 (95)	3.60 (91)	3.90 (99)	4.51 (115)	4.09 (104)	5.70 (145)	53.58 (1,361)
Average snowfall inches (cm)	1.1 (2.8)	0.9 (2.3)	0.3 (0.76)	0.0 (0.0)	0.0 (0.0)	0.0 (0.0)	0.0 (0.0)	0.0 (0.0)	0.0 (0.0)	0.0 (0.0)	0.0 (0.0)	0.2 (0.51)	2.5 (6.4)
Average precipitation days (≥ 0.01 in)	9.0	8.4	9.7	8.8	9.1	7.1	7.8	6.3	5.9	7.2	8.5	9.0	96.8
Average snowy days (≥ 0.1 in)	0.4	0.7	0.1	0.0	0.0	0.0	0.0	0.0	0.0	0.0	0.1	0.2	1.5
Source: NOAA

Climate data for Pine Bluff, Arkansas (Grider Field) (1991–2020 normals, extremes 1948–present)
Month	Jan	Feb	Mar	Apr	May	Jun	Jul	Aug	Sep	Oct	Nov	Dec	Year
Record high °F (°C)	85 (29)	86 (30)	92 (33)	95 (35)	98 (37)	104 (40)	108 (42)	110 (43)	104 (40)	97 (36)	87 (31)	81 (27)	110 (43)
Mean maximum °F (°C)	72.4 (22.4)	75.9 (24.4)	82.3 (27.9)	86.4 (30.2)	91.0 (32.8)	95.5 (35.3)	98.8 (37.1)	98.9 (37.2)	95.7 (35.4)	89.3 (31.8)	79.7 (26.5)	73.2 (22.9)	100.4 (38.0)
Mean daily maximum °F (°C)	51.8 (11.0)	56.1 (13.4)	64.8 (18.2)	73.8 (23.2)	81.6 (27.6)	88.9 (31.6)	91.7 (33.2)	91.3 (32.9)	85.9 (29.9)	75.3 (24.1)	63.0 (17.2)	54.0 (12.2)	73.2 (22.9)
Daily mean °F (°C)	42.8 (6.0)	46.5 (8.1)	54.6 (12.6)	63.1 (17.3)	71.6 (22.0)	79.1 (26.2)	81.9 (27.7)	80.9 (27.2)	74.7 (23.7)	63.7 (17.6)	52.5 (11.4)	45.0 (7.2)	63.0 (17.2)
Mean daily minimum °F (°C)	33.8 (1.0)	37.0 (2.8)	44.3 (6.8)	52.5 (11.4)	61.6 (16.4)	69.3 (20.7)	72.1 (22.3)	70.6 (21.4)	63.5 (17.5)	52.0 (11.1)	42.1 (5.6)	36.0 (2.2)	52.9 (11.6)
Mean minimum °F (°C)	18.5 (−7.5)	23.1 (−4.9)	28.0 (−2.2)	37.4 (3.0)	48.6 (9.2)	60.6 (15.9)	65.2 (18.4)	63.5 (17.5)	49.9 (9.9)	36.5 (2.5)	27.3 (−2.6)	22.9 (−5.1)	16.3 (−8.7)
Record low °F (°C)	−2 (−19)	−1 (−18)	17 (−8)	26 (−3)	35 (2)	49 (9)	56 (13)	52 (11)	38 (3)	28 (−2)	16 (−9)	−2 (−19)	−2 (−19)
Average precipitation inches (mm)	3.82 (97)	4.27 (108)	5.29 (134)	5.35 (136)	4.80 (122)	3.27 (83)	3.69 (94)	3.38 (86)	3.09 (78)	4.58 (116)	3.97 (101)	5.30 (135)	50.81 (1,291)
Average precipitation days (≥ 0.01 in)	9.6	9.7	10.9	9.4	11.2	8.6	8.9	7.9	7.0	8.7	9.1	9.5	110.5
Source: NOAA

== Demographics ==
Historical population
Census	Pop.	Note	%±
1850	460		—
1860	1,396		203.5%
1870	2,081		49.1%
1880	3,203		53.9%
1890	9,952		210.7%
1900	11,496		15.5%
1910	15,100		31.4%
1920	19,300		27.8%
1930	20,800		7.8%
1940	21,300		2.4%
1950	37,200		74.6%
1960	44,000		18.3%
1970	57,400		30.5%
1980	56,600		−1.4%
1990	57,100		0.9%
2000	55,085		−3.5%
2010	49,083		−10.9%
2020	41,253		−16.0%
2025 (est.)	38,213	▼	−7.4%

=== Racial and ethnic composition ===
Pine Bluff, Arkansas – Racial and ethnic composition Note: the US Census treats Hispanic/Latino as an ethnic category. This table excludes Latinos from the racial categories and assigns them to a separate category. Hispanics/Latinos may be of any race.
Race / Ethnicity (NH = Non-Hispanic)	Pop. 2000	Pop. 2010	Pop. 2020	% 2000	% 2010	% 2020
White alone (NH)	17,609	10,489	7,284	31.97%	21.37%	17.66%
Black or African American alone (NH)	36,130	36,946	31,744	65.59%	75.27%	76.95%
Native American or Alaska Native alone (NH)	88	81	117	0.16%	0.17%	0.28%
Asian alone (NH)	394	306	314	0.72%	0.62%	0.76%
Native Hawaiian or Pacific Islander alone (NH)	20	4	54	0.04%	0.01%	0.13%
Other Race alone (NH)	27	36	96	0.05%	0.07%	0.23%
Mixed race or Multiracial (NH)	365	509	886	0.66%	1.04%	2.15%
Hispanic or Latino (any race)	452	712	758	0.82%	1.45%	1.84%
Total	55,085	49,083	41,253	100.00%	100.00%	100.00%

=== 2020 census ===
As of the 2020 census, Pine Bluff had a population of 41,253. The median age was 38.0 years. 22.2% of residents were under the age of 18 and 16.0% of residents were 65 years of age or older. For every 100 females there were 93.4 males, and for every 100 females age 18 and over there were 89.8 males age 18 and over.

98.0% of residents lived in urban areas, while 2.0% lived in rural areas.

There were 16,086 households in Pine Bluff, of which 29.9% had children under the age of 18 living in them. Of all households, 26.6% were married-couple households, 22.9% were households with a male householder and no spouse or partner present, and 44.8% were households with a female householder and no spouse or partner present. About 36.4% of all households were made up of individuals and 13.7% had someone living alone who was 65 years of age or older.

There were 19,197 housing units, of which 16.2% were vacant. The homeowner vacancy rate was 2.5% and the rental vacancy rate was 13.1%.

Racial composition as of the 2020 census
Race	Number	Percent
White	7,358	17.8%
Black or African American	31,839	77.2%
American Indian and Alaska Native	137	0.3%
Asian	321	0.8%
Native Hawaiian and Other Pacific Islander	54	0.1%
Some other race	499	1.2%
Two or more races	1,045	2.5%

=== 2010 census ===
As of the census of 2010, there were 49,083 people, 18,071 households, and 11,594 families residing in the city. The population density was 1,048.8 inhabitants per square mile (404.9/km^{2}). There were 20,923 housing units at an average density of 447.1 units per square mile (172.6 units/km^{2}). The racial makeup of the city was 75.6% Black or African American, 21.8% White, 0.2% Native American, 0.63% Asian, 0.01% Pacific Islander, 0.68% from other races, and 1.1% from two or more races. 1.5% of the population were Latino of any race.

There were 18,071 households, out of which 28.8% had children under the age of 18 living with them, 31.3% were married couples living together, 27.7% had a female householder with no husband present, and 35.8% were non-families. 31.3% of all households were made up of individuals, and 10.6% had someone living alone who was 65 years of age or older. The average household size was 2.49 and the average family size was 3.14.

In the city, the population was spread out, with 25.5% under the age of 18, 13.4% from 18 to 24, 24.3% from 25 to 44, 24.4% from 45 to 64, and 12.4% who were 65 years of age or older. The median age was 33.4 years. For every 100 females, there were 90.6 males. For every 100 females age 18 and over, there were 85.6 males.

The median income for a household in the city was $30,415, and the median income for a family was $39,993. Males had a median income of $38,333 versus $28,936 for females. The per capita income for the city was $17,334. About 24.3% of families and 30.6% of the population were below the poverty line, including 45.6% of those under age 18 and 13.7% of those age 65 or over.

=== Crime ===
Pine Bluff had 23 homicides in 2021. Pine Bluff had 23 murders in 2020 – a rate of 56.5 murders per 100,000 people. The national average was 6.5 murders per 100,000 people in 2020.

== Economy ==
A paper mill in Pine Bluff

Jefferson County is located in the heart of a rich agricultural area in the Arkansas River Basin. The leading products include cotton, soybeans, cattle, rice, poultry, timber and catfish.

Major area employers include Jefferson Regional Medical Center, Simmons First National Corp., Tyson Foods, Evergreen Packaging, the Pine Bluff Arsenal and the Union Pacific Railroad. It is the large number of paper mills in the area that give Pine Bluff its, at times, distinctive odor, a feature known prominently among Arkansans.

In 2009, Pine Bluff was included on the Forbes list of America's 10 most impoverished cities.

Saracen Casino Resort in Pine Bluff was the first purpose-built casino in Arkansas. Completed in 2020 at a cost of $350 million, it will employ over 1,100 full-time staff.

== Arts and culture ==
The Pine Bluff Convention Center is one of the state's largest meeting facilities. The Arts and Science Center features theatrical performances and workshops for children and adults. Pine Bluff did also boast the only Band Museum in the country but it has closed. Other areas of interest include downtown murals depicting the history of Pine Bluff, the Pine Bluff/Jefferson County Historical Museum, Arkansas Entertainers Hall of Fame and the Arkansas Railroad Museum.

The King Cotton Classic, which ran from 1982 to 1999, was one of the premier high school basketball tournaments in the country. It featured many future NBA players, including Corliss Williamson and Jason Kidd. The King Cotton Holiday Classic returned to the Pine Bluff Convention Center on December 27, 2018, as part of Go Forward, headed by Sam Glover.

=== Library ===
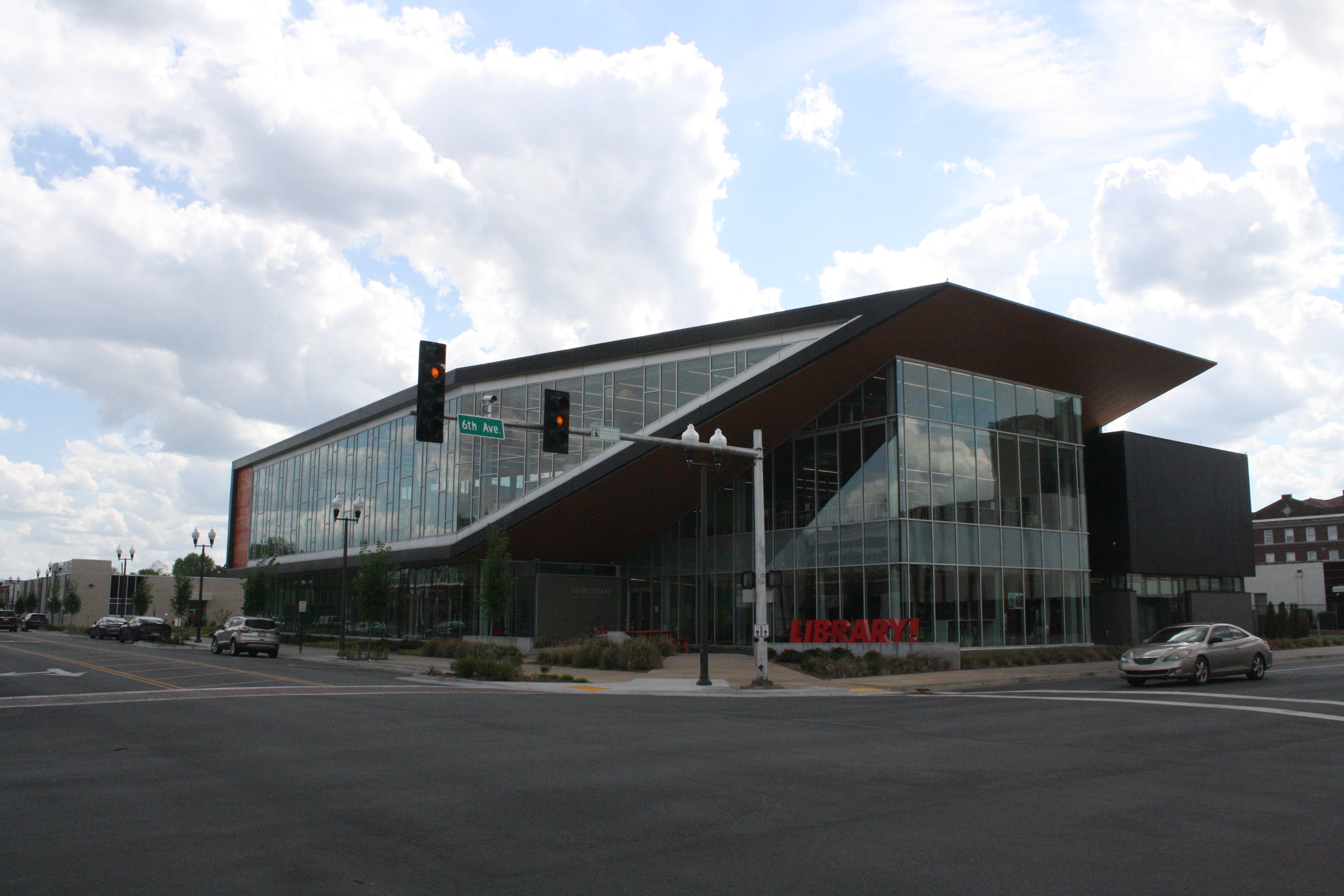
Pine Bluff Main Library

The Pine Bluff and Jefferson County Library System maintains its main library in the Civic Center in downtown. The city received its first library in 1913. The library system also operates the Watson Chapel Dave Burdick Library in the Watson Chapel neighborhood.

The Main Library of the Pine Bluff and Jefferson County Library System contains an extensive genealogy collection, including the online obituary index of the Pine Bluff Commercial, Arkansas census records, and digital collections, which consists of many county and city records for much of southeast Arkansas. In addition to downtown Pine Bluff's Main Library, PBJCLS branch libraries can also be found in the city's Watson Chapel area, as well as in White Hall, Redfield, and Altheimer.

== Parks and recreation ==
Townsend Park was built on a 100-acre (40 ha) plot of land meant for a park for black people. The land was donated by the president of the Arkansas Agricultural, Mechanical, and Normal College to the state government. It was named after Merrill High School principal William J. Townsend.

== Government ==
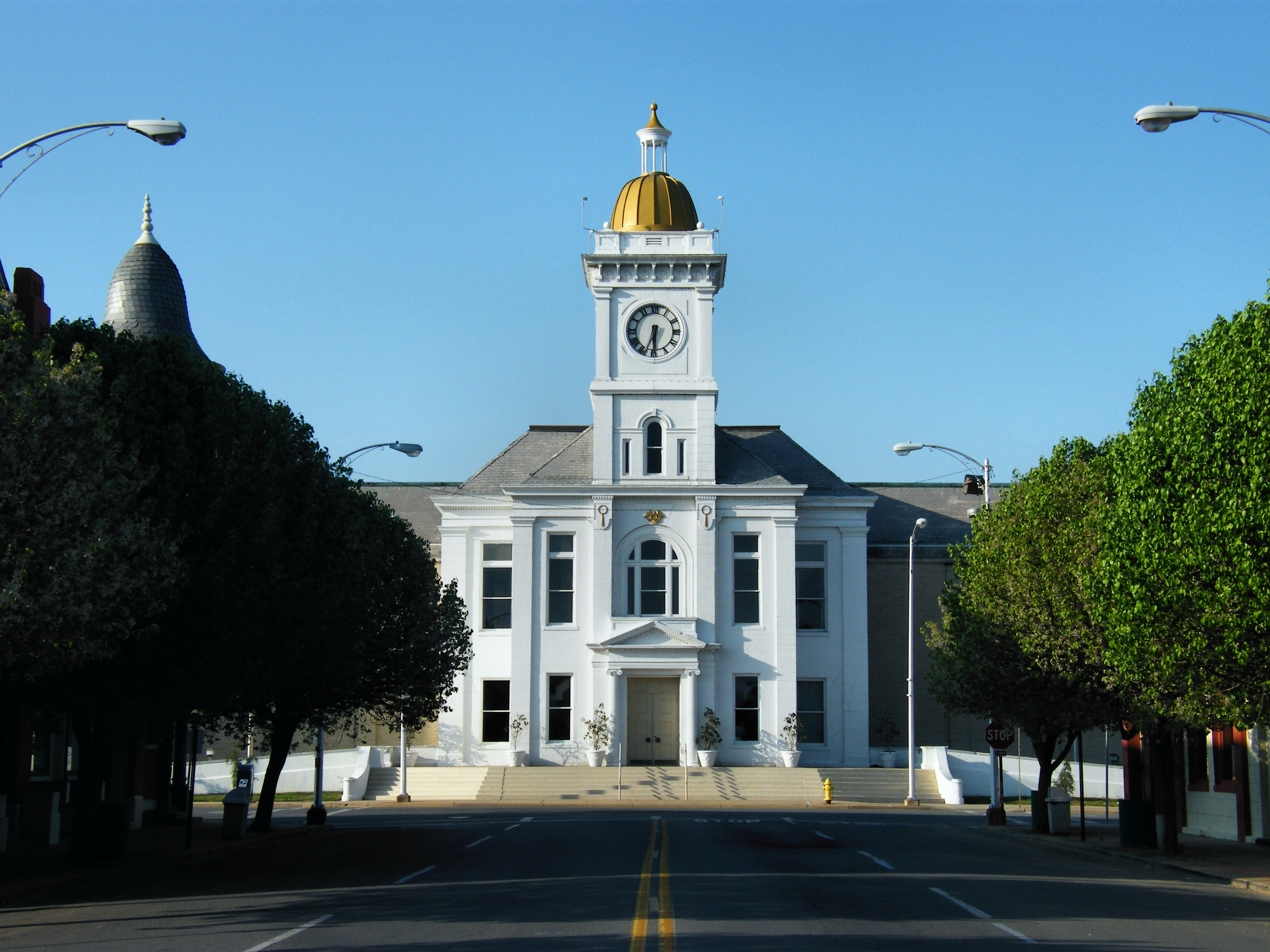
South façade of the Courthouse

The City of Pine Bluff is governed by the mayor–council government system, with the mayor, city attorney, city clerk and treasurer are all elected at large. The Pine Bluff City Council is the legislative body of the city. This group is constituted of eight members, with two members representing each of the city's four wards. Each council member serves a four-year term, and elections are staggered every two years. Meetings of the city council are held in the Pine Bluff City Council Chambers on the first and third Monday of every month unless otherwise scheduled.

The city also has ten commissions for citizens to serve upon, with approval required by both the mayor and city council. They are: Advertising and Promotion, Aviation, Civic Auditorium Complex, Civil Service, Historic District, Historical Railroad Preservation, Parks and Recreation, Pine Bluff / Jefferson County Port Authority, Planning and Wastewater Utility. The city also has four boards and one commission that fills their own vacancies: Arkansas River Regional Intermodal Facilities Board, Arts and Science Center for Southeast Arkansas Board of Trustees, Cemetery Committee, Library Board and Taylor Field Operations Facilities Board.

As the county seat of Jefferson County, Pine Bluff also hosts all functions of county government at the Jefferson County Courthouse in downtown Pine Bluff.

== Education ==
The University of Arkansas at Pine Bluff (UAPB) is the second oldest public educational institution in the state of Arkansas, and the oldest with a black heritage. It maintains one of the nation's few aquaculture research programs and the only one in the state of Arkansas. It also houses the University Museum and Cultural Center dedicated to preserving the history of UAPB and the Arkansas Delta.

The newly accredited Southeast Arkansas College features technical career programs as well as a 2-year college curriculum.

Pine Bluff is served by three school districts: Pine Bluff School District, Watson Chapel School District, and White Hall School District, as well as a number of charter schools and the Ridgeway Christian School also serve the city.

=== Colleges and universities ===
- University of Arkansas at Pine Bluff
- Southeast Arkansas College

=== Public schools ===
- Pine Bluff School District, including Pine Bluff High School
- Watson Chapel School District, including Watson Chapel High School
- White Hall School District includes parts of Pine Bluff; White Hall High School is in neighboring White Hall.

Prior to integration, black students attended separate, segregated schools. These included Merrill High School, Townsend Park High School, Coleman High School, and Southeast High School.

In December 2020 the Arkansas State Board of Education ruled that the Dollarway School District should merge into the Pine Bluff School District as of July 1, 2021. According to the consolidation plan, all schools of the two districts will continue to operate post-merger. Accordingly, the attendance boundary maps of the respective schools remained the same for the 2021–2022 school year, and all DSD territory went into the PBSD territory. The exception was with the pre-kindergarten levels, as all PBSD areas are now assigned to Forrest Park/Greenville School, including the territory from the former Dollarway district. Dollarway High School closed in 2023.

=== Private schools ===
There are two private schools in Pine Bluff: Ridgway Christian School (K3–12th) and Maranatha Baptist Academy K3–12.

The city formerly hosted Catholic schools:

- St. Joseph Catholic School – Grades 5–12, opened in 1993, closed in 2013
- St. Peter's Catholic School – The first school in Arkansas for black children to be established, was established in 1889 by St. Joseph Church Pastor Monsignor John Michael "J.M." Lucey as the Colored Industrial Institute and in 1897 became St. Peter Academy a.k.a. St. Peter High School. It closed in 1975, and reopened as an elementary school (Grades Preschool through 6) operated by the School Sisters of Notre Dame in 1985. It closed permanently in 2012. It was the last Catholic school established for black students in the State of Arkansas.
- St. Raphael School – A majority black school, it closed in 1960

== Infrastructure ==
=== Transportation ===
==== Highways ====
- Interstate 530
- US Route 63
- US Route 65
- US Route 79
- U.S. Route 270
- U.S. Route 425
- Highway 15
- Highway 54
- Highway 81
- Highway 190
- Highway 365

==== Water ====
Located on the navigable Arkansas River, with a slackwater harbor, Pine Bluff is accessible by water via the Port of Pine Bluff, the anchor of the city's Harbor Industrial District.

==== Air ====
Pine Bluff's municipal airport, Grider Field (PBF), is located 4 miles (6.4 km) southeast of the city.

==== Buses ====
Royal Coach Lines offers local access to intrastate, regional, and charter services.

The city-owned Pine Bluff Transit operate six routes on a 12-hour/day, weekday basis.

==== Railroad ====
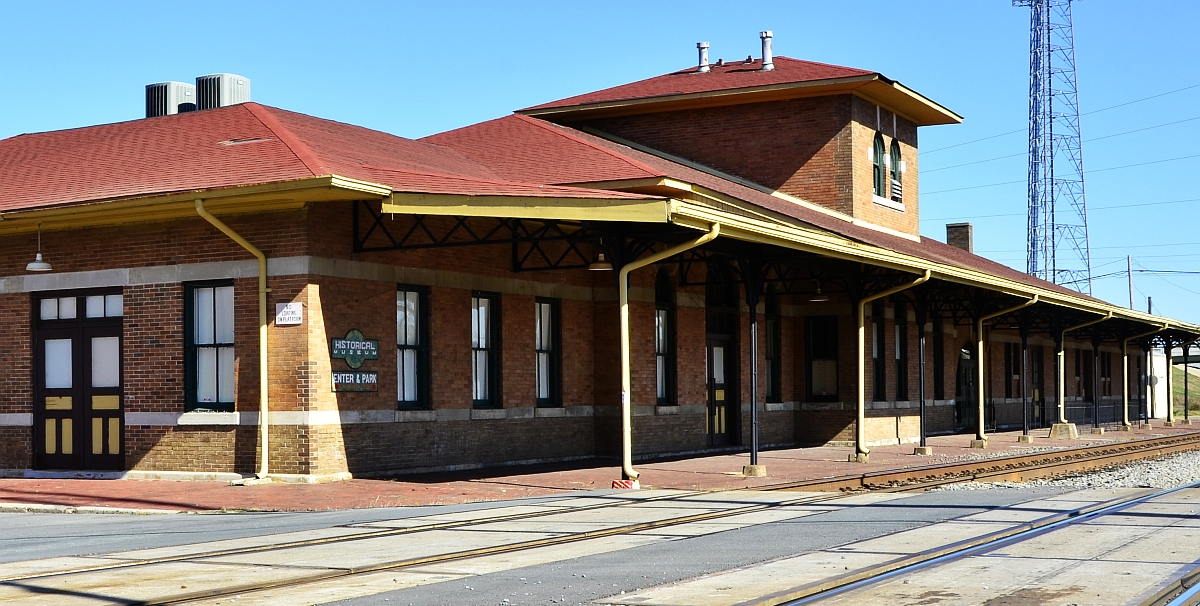
Union Station, listed on the NRHP

Current freight rail service to and through Pine Bluff is provided by the Union Pacific Railroad.

=== Correctional facilities ===
In 1972, the City of Pine Bluff and the "Fifty for the Future," a business leader group, donated 80 acres (32 ha) of land to the Arkansas Department of Correction (ADC). This parcel was developed as the Pine Bluff Complex.

Since 1979 it has included the ADC state headquarters; the administrative Annex East is on Harding Avenue south of city hall. The Ester Unit (formerly the Diagnostic Unit), the Pine Bluff Unit, and the Randall L. Williams Correctional Facility are in the "Pine Bluff Complex," as are the headquarters of the Arkansas Correctional School system.

The ADC Southeast Arkansas Community Corrections Center is in Pine Bluff.

=== Utilities ===
==== Water ====
Liberty Utilities treats potable water and operates the water distribution system in Pine Bluff (including Watson Chapel), as well as Hardin, Ladd, and White Hall. This partnership began in 1942 between the City of Pine Bluff and Arkansas Municipal Water Company, which has been acquired and merged to become Liberty Utilities.

Water is pumped from 12 wells that pump from the Sparta Sand Aquifer to three water treatment plants capable of producing 20,000,000 US gallons (76,000,000 L) per day (total). Each plant uses a process of pre-chlorination, aeration, filtration, and chlorine residual. Hydrofluosilic acid and zinc orthophosphate are also added in addition to chlorine. The water is then distributed to approximately serving over 18,000 customers via 388 miles (624 km) of water distribution mains.

==== Wastewater ====
The Pine Bluff Wastewater Utility provides operation and maintenance of the city's municipally owned sewage collection and conveyance system. This system includes over 450 miles (720 km) of pipe and 52 lift stations to collect municipal and industrial wastewater and convey it to the Boyd Point Treatment Facility, where the daily flow is 30,000,000 US gallons (110,000,000 L).

== Notable people ==
- Blanch Ackers, painter
- Larry D. Alexander, visual artist, writer,
- Broncho Billy Anderson, actor, honorary Academy Award winner
- Kris Bankston (born 1999), basketball player in the Israeli Basketball Premier League
- John Barfield, Major League Baseball player
- Mark Bradley, National Football League player
- Clifton R. Breckinridge, U.S. Representative from Arkansas
- Big Bill Broonzy, musician, member of Blues Hall of Fame
- Charles Brown, Rock and Roll Hall of Fame inductee, blues musician/singer
- Jim Ed Brown, country music artist
- The Browns, country music trio
- Bill Carr, 1932 Olympic double gold medalist
- Joe Barry Carroll, basketball player, top pick of 1980 NBA draft
- Monte Coleman, NFL player, former University of Arkansas at Pine Bluff head coach
- Junior Collins, jazz musician
- Joseph Carter Corbin, educator, principal of the University of Arkansas at Pine Bluff, principal of Merrill High School
- Harvey C. Couch, founder, Arkansas Power & Light
- CeDell Davis, blues musician
- Janette Davis, singer
- L. Clifford Davis, civil rights attorney, judge
- Larry Davis, blues musician
- Buddy Deane, DJ and onetime host of pioneering music TV series, The Buddy Deane Show.
- Jay Dickey, lawyer and politician
- Jeff Donaldson, visual artist, founder AfriCOBRA
- Marty Embry, professional basketball player, chef, author
- Kenneth B. Ferguson, Democratic member of Arkansas House of Representatives
- Stephanie Flowers, African-American member of Arkansas State Senate former member of Arkansas House of Representatives
- Vivian Flowers, African-American Democratic member of Arkansas House of Representatives from Pine Bluff since 2015; diversity officer at UAMS Medical Center in Little Rock
- Debra Ford, colorectal surgeon and academic administrator
- Rodney Shelton Foss, possibly first American killed in World War II
- Charles Greene, Olympic gold medalist, track & field
- George W. Haley, U.S. ambassador
- Isaac Scott Hathaway, visual artist, first African American to create a coin for the U.S. Treasury
- George Edmund Haynes, first executive director of National Urban League
- Chester Himes, novelist,
- Beth Holloway, author and mother of Natalee Holloway
- George Howard Jr., federal judge
- Mike Huckabee (born 1955), 44th governor of Arkansas
- Torii Hunter, Major League Baseball player, 5-time All-Star
- Don Hutson, member of College and Pro Football Hall of Fame
- Bobby Hutton, founding member of Black Panther Party
- George G.M. James, author
- Joseph Jarman, jazz saxophonist
- Charles Johnson, Negro league baseball player
- David Johnson, football player
- Kenneth Johnson, television producer
- Theresa A. Jones, neuroscientist
- E. Fay Jones, architect and designer
- Camille Keaton, actress
- Carl Kidd, player in Canadian and National Football Leagues
- Lafayette Lever, NBA player
- Henry Jackson Lewis, political cartoonist
- Kay Linaker, actress
- Dallas Long, Olympic gold medalist
- Martell Mallett, player in Canadian and National Football Leagues
- Peter McGehee, novelist
- Dwight McKissic, Southern Baptist minister
- Carl McVoy, rock 'n' roll pianist/vocalist
- Chris Mercer, the first African-American deputy state prosecutor in the South, one of the "six pioneers" who integrated the University of Arkansas Law School.
- Constance Merritt, poet
- Martha Mitchell, wife of U.S. Attorney General John N. Mitchell
- Raye Montague, US Navy engineer
- Matt "Vegas Matt" Morrow, YouTuber and gambler
- Mary Mouser, actress known for the role of Samantha LaRusso in Cobra Kai
- Bitsy Mullins, jazz trumpeter
- Smokie Norful, Grammy Award-winning gospel singer
- Freeman Harrison Owens, inventor
- Rita Panahi, conservative commentator and host on Sky News Australia
- Pat Pappas, politician
- Ben Pearson, bowyer
- Edward J. Perkins, U.S. ambassador
- U.S. Reed, former college basketball player
- Elizabeth Rice, actress
- Andree Layton Roaf, justice of Arkansas Supreme Court
- Willie Roaf, NFL Hall of Famer
- John Roane (1817–1867), 4th Governor of Arkansas; Brigadier General Army of Confederate States
- Bobby Rush, Grammy Award-Winning musician, member of Blues Hall of Fame
- William Seawell, brigadier general in U.S. Air Force
- Peggy Shannon, actress
- Pamela A. Smith, police chief of the Metropolitan Police Department of the District of Columbia and United States Park Police
- Les Spann, jazz musician
- Jeremy Sprinkle, (White Hall) tight end for NFL's Washington Commanders
- Katherine Stinson, aviator
- James L. Stone, Medal of Honor recipient
- Francis Cecil Sumner, psychologist
- Jerry Taylor, businessman, legislator, Mayor of Pine Bluff
- Clark Terry, Grammy Award-winning jazz musician
- John Thach, U.S. Navy Admiral
- Sue Bailey Thurman, African-American author, lecturer, and historian
- Krista White, winner of America's Next Top Model Cycle 14
- Reggie Wilkes, football player, financial advisor
- Henry Wilkins III, state legislator, academic
- Henry Wilkins IV, state legislator, judge
- Josetta Wilkins, state legislator, academic
- J. Mayo Williams, blues/gospel/jazz producer, member of Blues Hall of Fame

== Sister city ==
- Bandō, Ibaraki, Japan – sister city since October 9, 1989

== See also ==
- Hestand Stadium
- List of municipalities in Arkansas
- National Register of Historic Places listings in Jefferson County, Arkansas
