= Sulphur Springs, Jefferson County, Arkansas =

Census-designated place in Jefferson County, Missouri, United States

Sulphur Springs, Arkansas White Sulphur Springs, Arkansas
- Census-designated place
- Location within Arkansas
- Coordinates: 34°10′17″N 92°07′27″W
- Country: United States
- State: Arkansas
- County: Jefferson
- Township: Spring

Area
  - Total: 5.54 sq mi (14.36 km^{2})
  - Land: 5.53 sq mi (14.31 km^{2})
  - Water: 0.019 sq mi (0.05 km^{2})
- Elevation: 305 ft (93 m)

Population (2020)
  - Total: 1,032
  - Density: 187/sq mi (72.1/km^{2})
- Time zone: UTC-6 (Central (CST))
  - Summer (DST): UTC-5 (CDT)
- ZIP code (s): 72079
- Area code (s): 870
- FIPS Code: 05-67790
- GNIS feature ID: 2612132
- Major airport: LIT

Sulphur Springs, also known as White Sulphur Springs, is a census-designated place (CDP) in Spring Township, Jefferson County, Arkansas, United States. Per the 2020 census, the population was 1,032.

== History ==
Until 1819, the area west of Pine Bluff in what is now Jefferson and Grant counties was a mostly unpopulated wilderness. In that year, the Mississippi and Arkansas rivers flooded the Delta area east of Pine Bluff, covering all of southeast Arkansas except for some of the absolute high points. This western area was very hilly, and had mostly small streams which did not flood. Shortly after the flood, the George Brummitt family moved from Desha County to what became White Sulphur Springs. He bought 40 acres on what is now the site of White Sulphur Springs Camp from the Federal Government with a War of 1812 land bounty and patented an additional 360 acres around the circumference of the spring property.

Many others saw the wisdom of settling on higher ground, including Brushrod Lee, who settled about a mile west near several springs and built a plantation known as Lee Springs. Lee was a doctor and with the establishment of his large house and medical practice, the community became a destination for folks from all over the state to come and drink and bathe in the waters from the two sets of springs. Pine Bluff residents and others made summer homes in the area.

In 1855 the burgeoning community applied for a post office for the town under the name of Sulphur Springs, but since there already was a town by that name in the northwestern part of the state, they chose the name White Sulphur Springs instead. During the American Civil War, White Sulphur Springs became a mobilization point for troops in the region. The Confederate hospital was moved to White Sulphur Springs from Pine Bluff in 1862, and many died and were buried at Camp White Sulphur Springs Confederate Cemetery. In September 1863 the U.S. Army burned the town, leaving nothing. Most residents abandoned or sold their land and left the area. According to census records, almost none of those who lived at the springs in 1860 were there in 1870 when a Methodist minister named Benjamin Watson moved to the area, became a Presbyterian, and founded a church and school which was later known as Watson Chapel.

It was 25 years after the American Civil War before the springs became the site of a real town again with the building of a hotel by two men, one black and one white. Unfortunately they were burned out twice, possibly by prohibitionists or racists. The two eventually rebuilt the town but it never recovered its former glory.

After the war, residents continued to bury their dead in the Camp White Sulphur Springs Confederate Cemetery, with only a few of the grave sites being marked.

== Demographics ==
Historical population
Census	Pop.	Note	%±
2010	1,101		—
2020	1,032		−6.3%
U.S. Decennial Census; 2010 2020

=== Racial and ethnic composition ===
Sulphur Springs CDP, Arkansas – Racial and ethnic composition Note: the US Census treats Hispanic/Latino as an ethnic category. This table excludes Latinos from the racial categories and assigns them to a separate category. Hispanics/Latinos may be of any race.
Race / Ethnicity (NH = Non-Hispanic)	Pop 2010	Pop 2020	% 2010	% 2020
White alone (NH)	984	794	89.37%	76.94%
Black or African American alone (NH)	68	151	6.18%	14.63%
Native American or Alaska Native alone (NH)	9	1	0.82%	0.10%
Asian alone (NH)	9	4	0.82%	0.39%
Native Hawaiian or Pacific Islander alone (NH)	1	0	0.09%	0.00%
Other race alone (NH)	0	4	0.00%	0.39%
Mixed race or Multiracial (NH)	15	51	1.36%	4.94%
Hispanic or Latino (any race)	15	27	1.36%	2.62%
Total	1,101	1,032	100.00%	100.00%

=== 2010 Census ===
As of the 2010 United States census, there were 66 people living in the CDP. The racial makeup of the CDP was 48.5% White, 42.4% Black, 7.6% Asian and 1.5% from two or more races.

As of the census of 2000, there were 82 people, 28 households, and 19 families living in the town. The population density was 35.0/mi^{2} (13.5/km^{2}). There were 43 housing units at an average density of 18.4/mi^{2} (7.1/km^{2}). The racial makeup of the town was 50.0% White and 50.0% Black or African American.

There were 28 households, out of which 57.1% had children under the age of 18 living with them, 42.9% were married couples living together, 14.3% had a female householder with no husband present, and 32.1% were non-families. 28.6% of all households were made up of individuals, and 21.4% had someone living alone who was 65 years of age or older. The average household size was 2.93 and the average family size was 3.53.

In the town the population was spread out, with 42.7% under the age of 18, 7.3% from 18 to 24, 31.7% from 25 to 44, 6.1% from 45 to 64, and 12.2% who were 65 years of age or older. The median age was 24 years. For every 100 females, there were 127.8 males. For every 100 females age 18 and over, there were 95.8 males.

The median income for a household in the town was $14,375, and the median income for a family was $14,583. Males had a median income of $25,938 versus $13,750 for females. The per capita income for the town was $9,037. There were 39.1% of families and 38.4% of the population living below the poverty line, including 42.9% of under eighteens and none of those over 64.

== Education ==
Sulphur Springs is served by the Watson Chapel School District. Watson Chapel High School is the zoned high school.

Previously it had its own elementary school, Sulphur Springs Elementary School. In the 1969-1970 school year it had 75 students, all white. At the time African-American students were not permitted to attend, and had to go to Coleman Elementary School, with older students going to Coleman High School.

== See also ==
- List of census-designated places in Missouri
