= Pine Bluff Arsenal =

United States Army arsenal in Arkansas

- Jefferson County, Arkansas
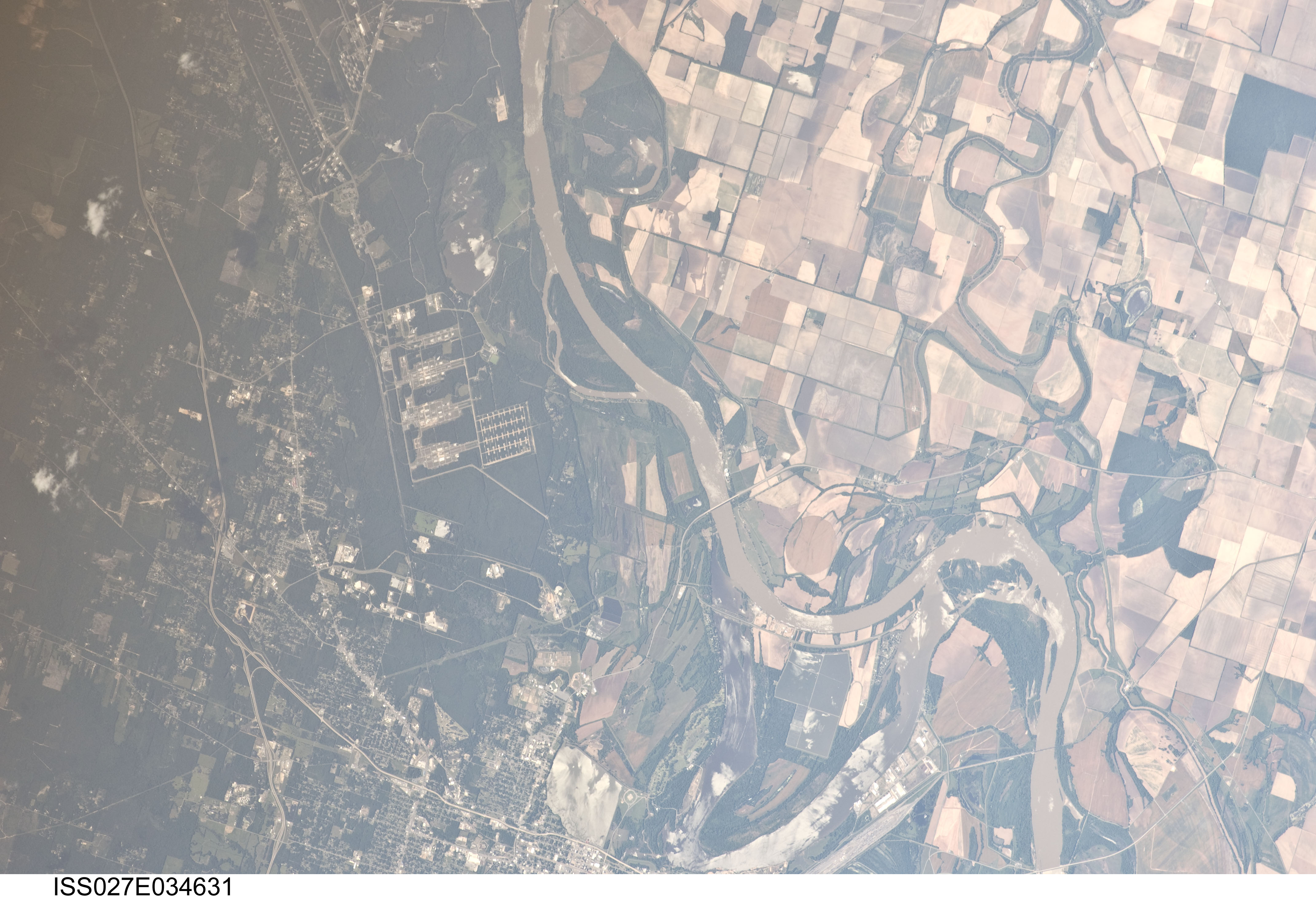
- NASA 2011 Satellite Photo

- AMC Shoulder Sleeve Insignia

Site information
- Type: Arsenal
- Owner: United States Army
- Open to the public: No
- Website: pba.army.mil

Location
- Location in Arkansas
- Coordinates: 34°19′57″N 92°05′12″W
- Area: 13,493 acres (5,460 ha; 21.083 sq mi)

Site history
- Built: November 2, 1941 (84 years ago)
- Built by: Corps of Engineers
- Battles/wars: World War II; American Campaign

The Pine Bluff Arsenal is a United States Army installation in Jefferson County, Arkansas, about eight miles (13 km) northwest of Pine Bluff and thirty miles (48 km) southeast of Little Rock. It is one of nine Army installations in the United States that stored chemical weapons. The arsenal supplies specialized production, storage, maintenance and distribution of readiness products, and delivers technical services to the Armed Forces and Homeland Security. It also designs, manufactures and refurbishes smoke, riot control, and incendiary munitions, as well as chemical/biological defense operations items. It serves as a technology center for illuminating and infrared munitions and is also the only place in the Northern Hemisphere where white phosphorus munitions are filled. Its Homeland Security mission includes first-responder equipment training and surveillance of pre-positioned equipment.

== History ==
=== World War II ===
The Pine Bluff Arsenal was established on November 2, 1941, for the manufacture of incendiary grenades and bombs. 5,000 acres, purchased from local physician James W. John, Sr, served as the foundation for the site. It was originally named the Chemical Warfare Arsenal but was renamed four months later. The mission expanded to include production and storage of pyrotechnic, riot control, and chemical-filled munitions. At the height of World War II, the plant expanded from making magnesium and thermite incendiary munitions to a chemical warfare manufacturing facility as well, producing lethal gases and chemical compounds installed in artillery shells and specifically designed bombs.

=== Cold War and late 20th century ===
In an incident after World War II, several captured German rockets containing mustard agents were accidentally launched into the surrounding countryside. Biological weapons operations were conducted at the arsenal from 1953 to 1969, but operations ceased when President Nixon banned biological weapons. Between 1954 and 1967, at least seven different biological agents were produced at the facility. All biological agents were destroyed between 1971 and 1973.

=== 21st century ===
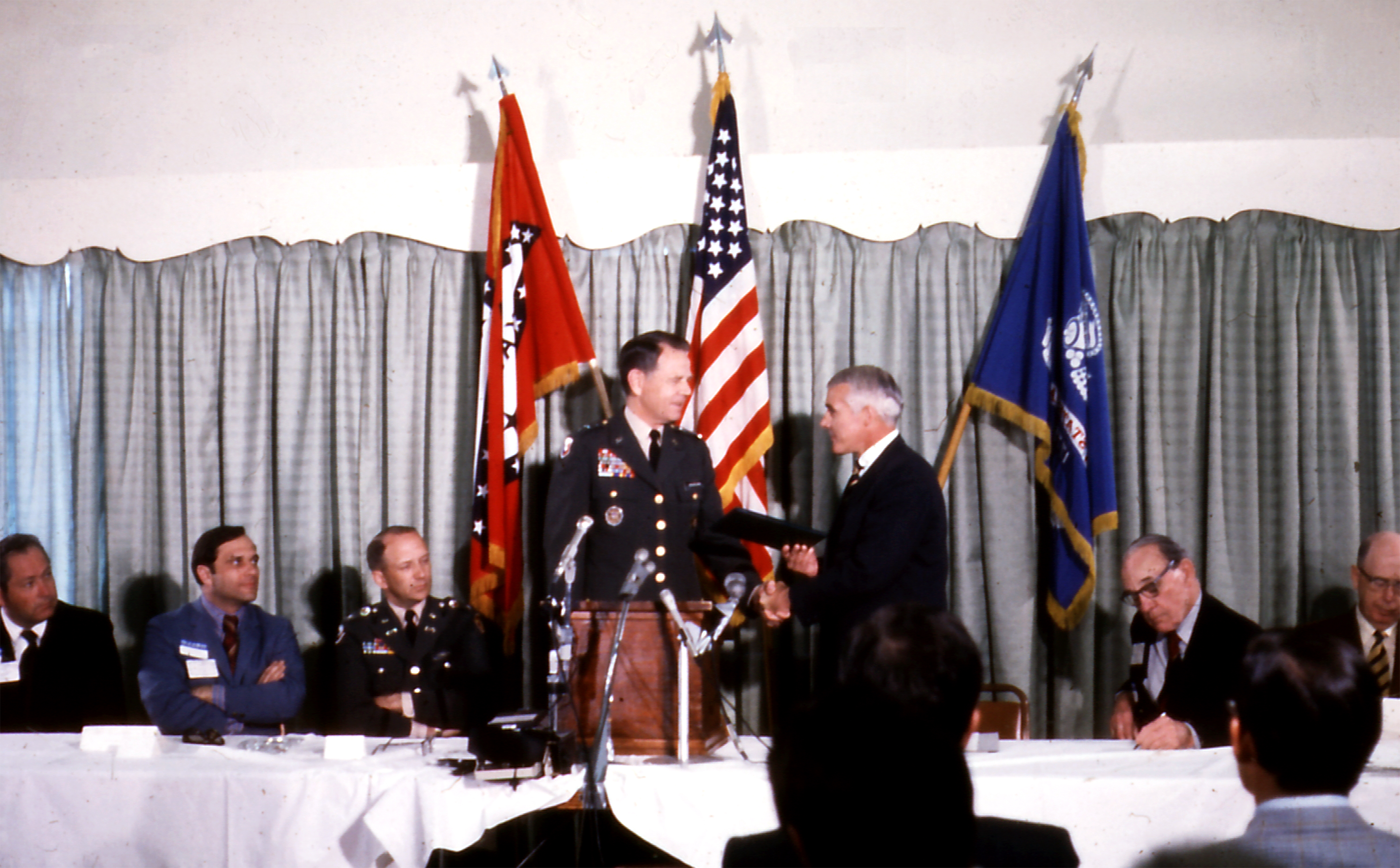
U.S. Food and Drug Administration Commissioner Charles C. Edwards, standing right, formally receives the transfer of biological facilities in 1971. The National Center for Toxicological Research (NCTR) was established at Jefferson, Arkansas the following year.

The Pine Bluff Arsenal chemical weapons stockpile consisted of declared quantities of rockets, land mines, and ton containers. These obsolete weapons were safely stored in high-security structures and carefully monitored until the U.S. Army Chemical Materials Agency completed their safe elimination in November 2010. The arsenal also safely stored other items classified as non-stockpile chemical materiel, which is not part of the nation's chemical weapons stockpile. The U.S. Army Chemical Material Agency completed a number of treaty-mandated chemical warfare disposal operations at the arsenal, described below.

The Pine Bluff Arsenal was the sole storage facility for the incapaciting hallucinogen BZ and the M43 BZ Cluster bomb intended to deliver it. The weapon systems and agent stockpiles were destroyed by incineration between in 1988-1989.

Pine Bluff Ton Container Decontamination Facility (PBTCDF): The PBTCDF began operations in September 2003, with the mission of decontaminating and recycling more than 4,300 short tons (3,900 t) containers (TCs) stored at the arsenal. The 1,600 lb (730 kg) steel containers once held hazardous materials and required decontamination for residual chemical agent hazard. Operators heated the TCs to 1,000 °F (538 °C) for 60 minutes, well in excess of the standard required by the Army to achieve chemical agent decontamination. This process significantly reduced liquid waste. Once decontaminated, TCs were loaded onto trailers for transport to a treatment, storage and disposal facility. There, they were cut in half, any remaining residue was removed, and the steel was recycled. PBTCDF successfully completed operations in July 2011; one result of this process was the recycling of more than 6,500,000 lb (3,200 short tons; 2,900 t) of steel.

Pine Bluff Explosive Destruction System (PBEDS): PBEDS began operations in June 2006 to destroy more than 1,200 recovered chemical warfare munitions at the arsenal, the largest inventory of recovered chemical warfare materiel in the nation. The system involved three Explosive Destruction System (EDS) units, each set up in a vapor containment structure. The EDS uses cutting charges to explosively access chemical munitions, eliminating their explosive capacity before the chemical agent is neutralized. The PBEDS inventory included 4.2-inch mortars as well as German Traktor rockets, which were captured during World War II. PBEDS operators destroyed the last munition in April 2010, marking the destruction of all non-stockpile materiel declared when the United States entered into the Chemical Weapons Convention (CWC).

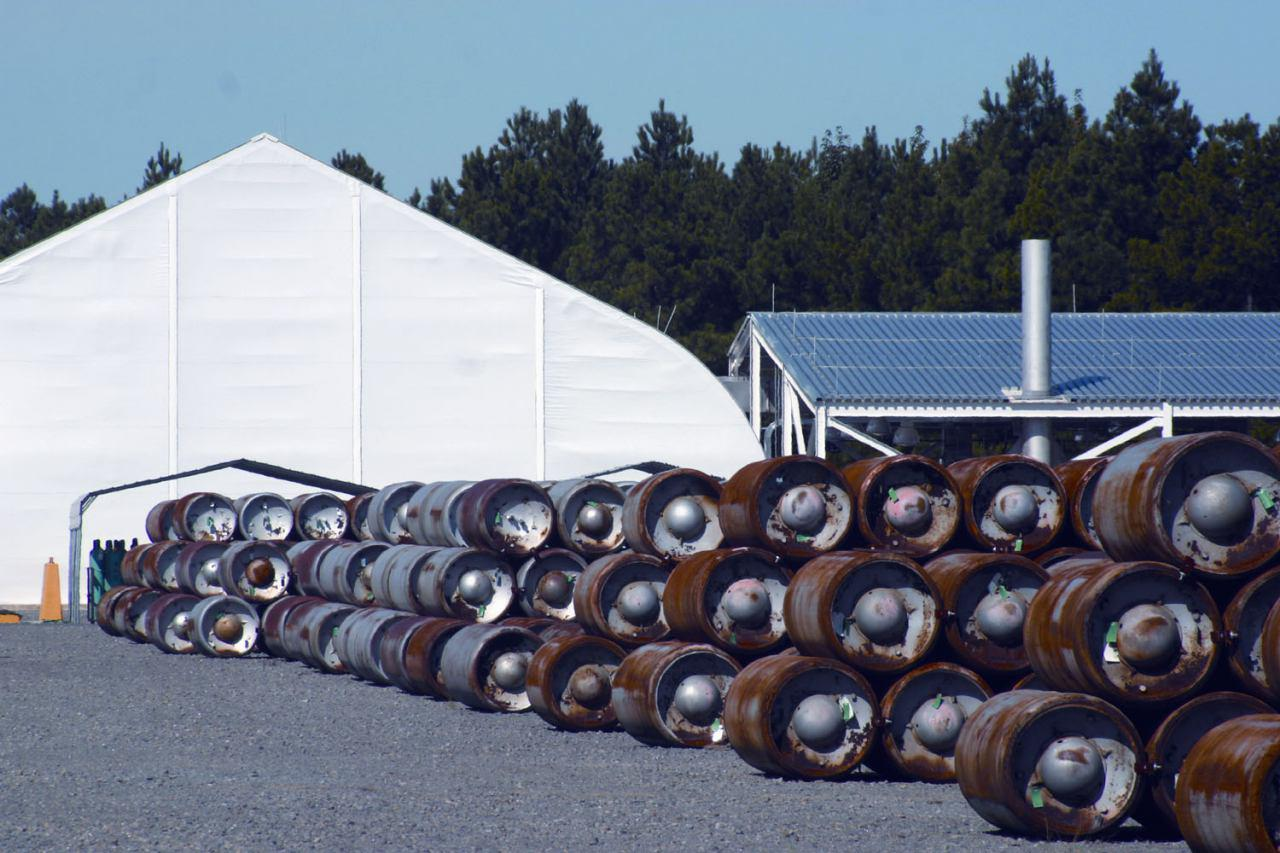
While empty today, 1,600-pound steel containers stored at Pine Bluff Arsenal once held hazardous materials and required decontamination. Operators decontaminated the last 4,307 ton containers in July 2011.

Pine Bluff Former Production Facilities: The arsenal once housed two chemical warfare production facilities, and NSCMP was charged with destroying them to comply with the CWC. Destroyed in 1999, the BZ Fill Facility filled munitions with the agent BZ, an Incapacitating Agent (a type of hallucinogen). In 2003, NSCMP began demolition of the former Pine Bluff Integrated Binary Production Facilities (PB IBPF), designed to produce binary chemicals and fill binary chemical weapons. These weapons were designed to mix two non-lethal chemicals to form a chemical agent in flight to a target. The DF Production/M20 Canister Fill and Close Facility was the only facility operated. From 1988 to 1990 it produced the binary precursor methylphosphonic difluoride (DF), inserting the chemical into coffee can-sized M20 canisters for use in the M687 155 mm Binary Artillery Projectile. The BLU-80/B Bigeye Bomb Fill Facility, QL Production Facility and DC Production Facility never operated, and all were demolished. The final remaining PB IBPF building, intended to fill binary munitions for the Multiple Launch Rocket System, but never used for that purpose, was reutilized as the Pine Bluff Binary Destruction Facility (PB BDF), to neutralize the binary precursor chemicals DF and QL. After neutralization was completed in October 2006, demolition of the building commenced. Completed on Dec. 28, 2006, it marked the end of the PB IBPF demolition and the last former chemical warfare production facility destroyed in the United States. This accomplishment was significant since it enabled NSCMP to surpass the Chemical Weapons Convention (CWC) treaty milestone of demolition of all the nation's former production facilities four months ahead of schedule. Approximately 2,800 tons of metal were recycled from the IBPF.

Assessment: Contents of recovered items at the arsenal were identified using the Pine Bluff Munitions Assessment System (PBMAS). PBMAS determined the contents and explosive condition of items before processing to enhance safe handling, treatment and disposal. PBMAS began analyzing the items in July 2005, using an X-ray system known as Digital Radiography and Computed Tomography, along with an assessment system known as Portable Isotopic Neutron Spectroscopy. Prior to PBMAS, NSCMP also assessed 300 drums that contained recovered chemical warfare materiel, known as the XP300 mission.

Chemical Agent Identification Set (CAIS) Destruction: Another successful NSCMP mission at the arsenal included the Rapid Response System (RRS), a transportable treatment technology, which processed more than 5,300 CAIS items once stored at the arsenal. The RRS began operations in August 2005, and completed processing in November 2006. For decades the arsenal stored chemical agent rockets (GB55's). During the 1980s, these were defueled and the warheads were destroyed. Mustard agent, VX, G were stored in large bunkers on the premises.

The Associated Press reported a leak in a container of white phosphorus was suspected to have ignited the fire that destroyed a warehouse at the Pine Bluff Arsenal on 6 June 2005. White smoke from the fire was seen as far away as 6 mi (9.7 km). When the fire was extinguished, approximately 19 hours later, officials reported the fire destroyed more than 7,500 canisters of white phosphorus. In the same article, AP reported the Pine Bluff Chemical Activity was home to 12 percent of the nation's chemical weapons stockpile." This stockpile was safely destroyed March 2005 - November 2010.

== Facilities ==
Pine Bluff Arsenal has a total area of 13,493 acres (55 km^{2}; 21 sq mi) with 665 buildings, 271 igloos and a storage capacity of 2,090,563 sq ft (190,000 m^{2}). Additionally, it has more than 5,000 acres (20 km^{2}; 7.8 sq mi) of land with the potential to be developed. Most residents are civilians working for the Department of Defense.

== Capabilities ==
Capabilities of the center include: chemical defense and test equipment; individual and collective chemical protection and decontamination systems; chemical material surveillance program; machining, fabrication and assembly; specialty ammunition production; less than lethal ammunition production; and quality assurance and joint logistics services.
