= Tyler Zuber =

American baseball player (born 1995)

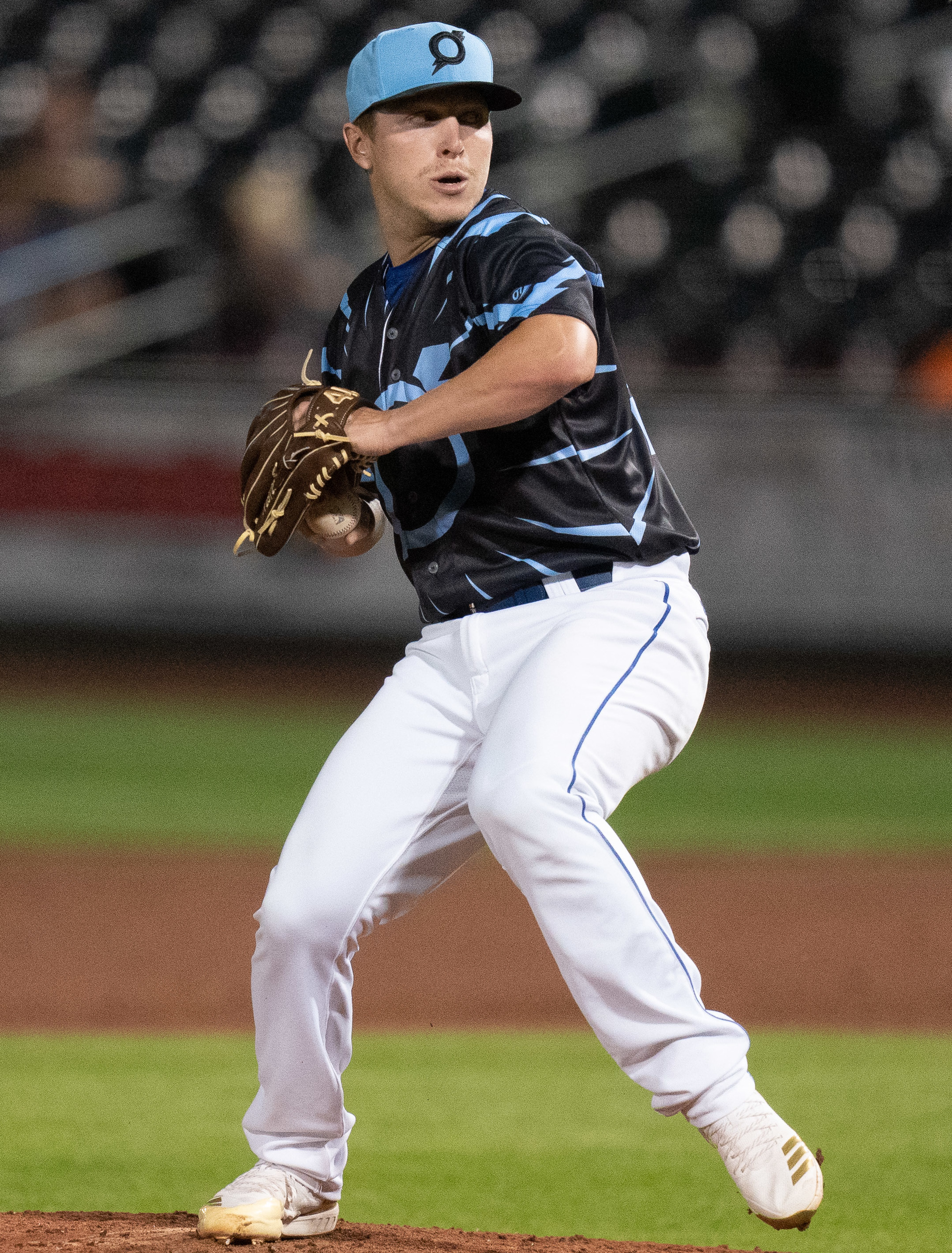
- Zuber with the Omaha Storm Chasers in 2021

Free agent
- Pitcher
- Born: June 16, 1995 (age 31); White Hall, Arkansas, U.S.
- Bats: Right Throws: Right

MLB debut
- July 24, 2020, for the Kansas City Royals

MLB statistics (through 2026 season)
- Win–loss record: 3–7
- Earned run average: 6.04
- Strikeouts: 115
- Stats at Baseball Reference

Teams
- Kansas City Royals (2020–2021); Tampa Bay Rays (2024); New York Mets (2025); Miami Marlins (2025–2026)

John Tyler Zuber (born June 16, 1995) is an American professional baseball pitcher who is a free agent. He has played in Major League Baseball (MLB) for the Kansas City Royals, Tampa Bay Rays, New York Mets, and Miami Marlins. He made his MLB debut in 2020.

== Amateur career ==
Zuber attended White Hall High School in White Hall, Arkansas and Arkansas State University, where he played college baseball for the Arkansas State Red Wolves. In 2016, he played collegiate summer baseball with the Brewster Whitecaps of the Cape Cod Baseball League. He was selected by the Kansas City Royals in the sixth round of the 2017 MLB draft. He was the highest drafted player in Arkansas State history.

== Professional career ==
=== Kansas City Royals ===
Zuber spent his first professional season with the Burlington Royals and Lexington Legends. He pitched 2018 with Lexington and the Wilmington Blue Rocks and 2019 with Wilmington and the Northwest Arkansas Naturals. He was invited to spring training by the Royals in 2020.

Zuber made his major league debut on July 24, 2020, against the Cleveland Indians, pitching 2 scoreless innings. With the 2020 Kansas City Royals, Zuber appeared in 23 games, compiling a 1-2 record with 4.09 ERA and 30 strikeouts in 22.0 innings pitched.

Zuber was placed on the 60-day injured list to begin the 2022 season on March 16, 2022, due to right shoulder impingement syndrome.

=== Arizona Diamondbacks ===
On October 26, 2022, Zuber was claimed off waivers by the Arizona Diamondbacks. He was designated for assignment on November 9, 2022, and outrighted to the Triple-A Reno Aces two days later.

After returning from his shoulder injury, Zuber made 16 appearances for Reno, and posted a 5.23 ERA with 18 strikeouts in 20 2/3 innings pitched. He was released by the Diamondbacks organization on July 3, 2023.

On January 31, 2024, Zuber signed a minor league contract with the Cleveland Guardians. The Guardians released Zuber on March 24, 2024.

=== Long Island Ducks ===
On April 23, 2024, Zuber signed with the Long Island Ducks of the Atlantic League of Professional Baseball. In 6 games for the Ducks, he recorded a 1.59 ERA with 10 strikeouts and 2 saves across 5 2/3 innings pitched.

=== Tampa Bay Rays ===
On May 13, 2024, Zuber's contract was purchased by the Tampa Bay Rays' organization. On July 18, the Rays added Zuber to their 40-man roster on and subsequently optioned him back to the Triple–A Durham Bulls. In two games for Tampa Bay, he logged a 2.70 ERA with 4 strikeouts over 3 1/3 innings.

=== New York Mets ===
On July 30, 2024, the Rays traded Zuber to the New York Mets in exchange for pitcher Paul Gervase. He spent the remainder of the year with the Triple-A Syracuse Mets, struggling to an 0-3 record and 12.38 ERA with 18 strikeouts across 17 appearances.

Zuber was optioned to Triple-A Syracuse to begin the 2025 season. He made one appearance for New York, allowing two runs on three hits with three strikeouts in two innings pitched against the Philadelphia Phillies on June 22, 2025. Zuber was designated for assignment following the signing of Zach Pop on July 5.

=== Miami Marlins ===
On July 9, 2025, Zuber was claimed off of waivers by the Miami Marlins. In nine appearances for Miami, he struggled to an 0-1 record and 11.70 ERA with 11 strikeouts over 10 innings of work. On August 30, Zuber was placed on the injured list due to a right lat strain. He was transferred to the 60-day injured list two days later, officially ending his season. On November 5, Zuber was removed from the 40-man roster and sent outright to Jacksonville. He elected free agency the following day.

On November 26, 2025, Zuber re-signed with the Marlins' organization on a minor league contract. To begin the 2026 season, he was assigned to Jacksonville, where he logged a 2-0 record and 5.20 ERA with 43 strikeouts and two saves across 20 games. On June 1, 2026, the Marlins selected Zuber's contract, adding him to their active roster. On October 30, he was sent outright to Triple-A and subsequently elected free agency.
