= PBCA =

PBCA or Pbca may refer to:

- Pbca, an international space group abbreviation
- Pickleball British Columbia Association
- Pine Bluff Chemical Activity, a unit of the United States Army Chemical Materials Agency
