= White Hall High School =

Location
- 700 Bulldog Drive; White Hall, Arkansas 71602; United States
- Coordinates: 34°17′2″N 92°6′25″W

Information
- School type: Public secondary school
- School district: White Hall School District
- Superintendent: Gary Williams
- CEEB code: 042045
- NCES School ID: 051414001156
- Principal: Jennifer Menard
- Teaching staff: 71.05 (FTE)
- Grades: 9–12
- Enrollment: 975 (2023–2024)
- Student to teacher ratio: 13.72
- Colors: Black and white
- Nickname: Bulldogs
- Website: www.whitehallsd.org/o/whhs

White Hall High School is a public high school located in White Hall, Arkansas, United States. White Hall serves grades 9–12 for the White Hall School District.

It serves White Hall, sections of Pine Bluff, and Redfield. It also serves Jefferson.

== History ==
Initially the Dollarway School District (DSD) sent older white students to White Hall High and other area high schools, as it did not have its own high school for white students nor one for black students. In 1957 DSD opened its own high school for white children, Dollarway High School.

== Athletics ==
The White Hall Bulldogs compete in the 5A Central Division of the Arkansas Activities Association (AAA). The following AAA-sanctioned sports are offered:

- Baseball (boys)
- Basketball (boys and girls)
- Football (boys)
- Golf (boys and girls)
- Soccer (boys and girls)
- Softball (girls)
- Tennis (boys and girls)
- Track and field (boys and girls)
- Volleyball (girls)
- Band
- E-Sport

The football team was head coached by Ryan Mallett, who played college football at the University of Arkansas and in the NFL for the New England Patriots, Baltimore Ravens, and Houston Texans. Mallett was hired as head coach in 2022 and held the position until his death in June 2023.

== Notable alumni ==
- Jeremy Sprinkle, NFL player (class of 2012)
- Tyler Zuber, MLB player (class of 2013)

== Notable staff ==
- Ryan Mallett, NFL player, White Hall football assistant/coach
