= Watson Chapel Academy =

Defunct segregation academy in Arkansas, United States

Location
- Route 7, Sulphur Spring Road; Pine Bluff, Arkansas; 34.1887184°N 92.0694878°W

Information
- Type: Private
- Established: 1971
- Closed: 1985
- Grades: K-12
- Colors: Purple and Gold

Watson Chapel Academy, better known as Chapel Academy (CA) was a private school in the Watson Chapel neighborhood of Pine Bluff, Arkansas. It was founded in 1971 as a segregation academy, which provided a means for white parents to keep their children from attending integrated public schools.

== History ==
Chapel Academy opened in 1971 with 199 students, along with nearby Jefferson Prep as one of two segregated alternatives to integrated public schools. The school was a member of Mid-South Association of Non-Public Schools, which primarily sponsored athletics. Chapel Academy closed in 1985.

== Notable people ==
Tim Storm, professional wrestler
