= Camp White Sulphur Springs Confederate Cemetery =

Historic cemetery in Arkansas, US

- U.S. National Register of Historic Places
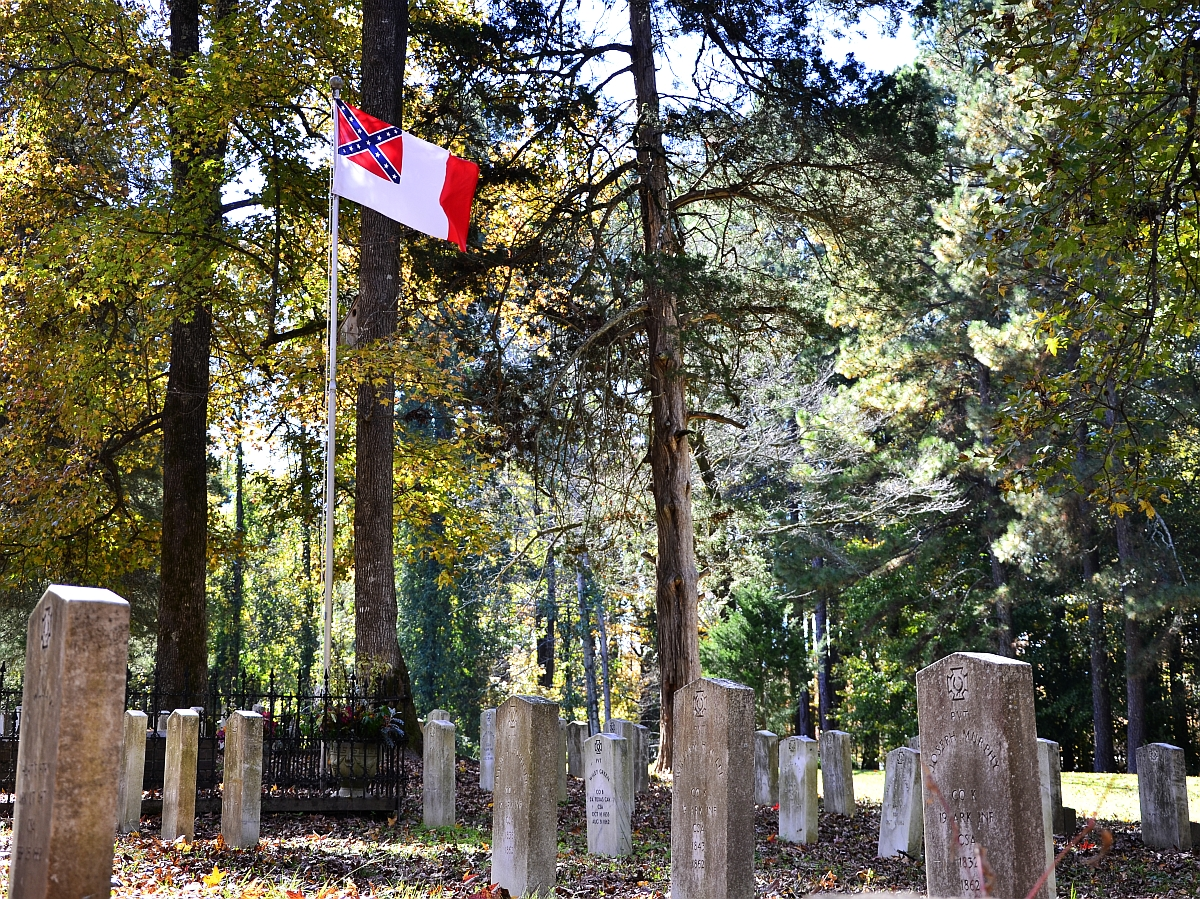

- Location within Arkansas Location within the United States
- Location: Near Sulphur Springs, Arkansas
- Coordinates: 34°11′0″N 92°07′12″W
- Area: less than one acre
- Built: 1862
- MPS: Civil War Commemorative Sculpture MPS
- NRHP reference No.: 04001512
- Added to NRHP: January 19, 2005

The Camp White Sulphur Springs Confederate Cemetery is an American Civil War cemetery in Arkansas. It is located northeast of the village of Sulphur Springs, also known as White Sulphur Springs, in Jefferson County.

== See also ==
- National Register of Historic Places listings in Jefferson County, Arkansas
