= Monte Coleman =

American football player and coach (1957–2026)

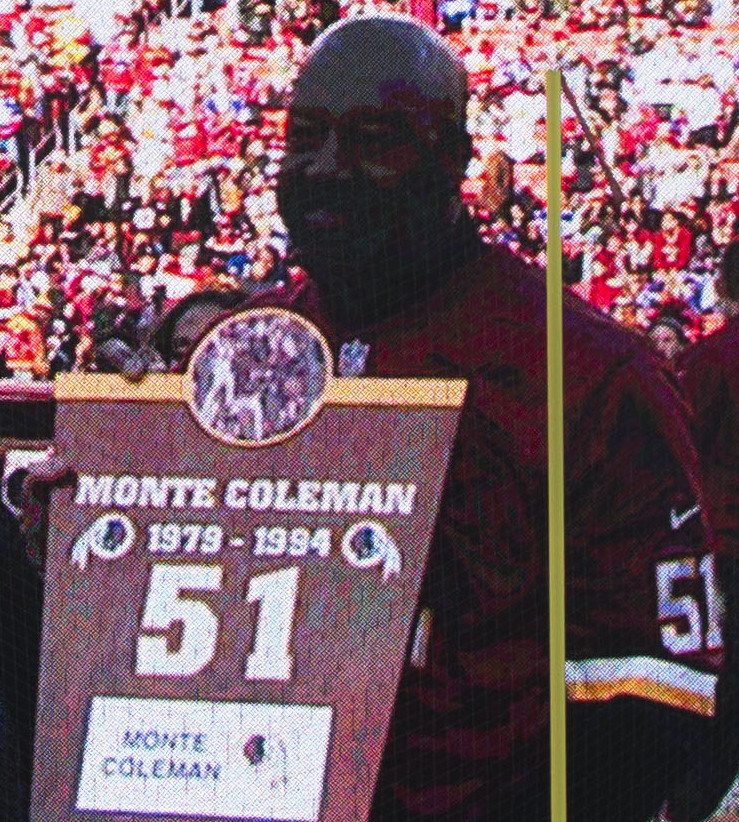
- Coleman during his induction in the Washington Redskins Ring of Fame in 2015

No. 51
- Position: Linebacker

Personal information
- Born: November 4, 1957; Pine Bluff, Arkansas, U.S.
- Died: April 26, 2026 (aged 68)
- Listed height: 6 ft 2 in (1.88 m)
- Listed weight: 242 lb (110 kg)

Career information
- High school: Pine Bluff
- College: Central Arkansas (1975–1978)
- NFL draft: 1979: 11th round, 289th overall pick

Career history
- As a player: Washington Redskins (1979–1994); As a coach: Arkansas–Pine Bluff (2003–2005; LB); Arkansas–Pine Bluff (2006–2007; DC); Arkansas–Pine Bluff (2008–2017; HC)

Awards and highlights
- As a player: 3× Super Bowl champion (XVII, XXII, XXVI); NFL combined tackles leader (1980); 80 Greatest Redskins; Washington Commanders Ring of Fame; As a coach: Southwestern Athletic Conference champion (2012)

Career NFL statistics
- Tackles: 1,002
- Sacks: 49.5
- Interceptions: 17
- Stats at Pro Football Reference

Head coaching record
- Regular season: 40–71 (.360)

Monte Leon Coleman (November 4, 1957 – April 26, 2026) was an American professional football player who was a linebacker for 16 seasons with the Washington Redskins of the National Football League (NFL) from 1979 to 1994. He won three Super Bowls with the Redskins.

He later was the head football coach for the Arkansas–Pine Bluff Golden Lions from 2008 to 2017, leading the team to a Southwestern Athletic Conference championship in 2012.

== College career ==
Despite not playing football in high school, Coleman played college football for the University of Central Arkansas Bears, then a National Association of Intercollegiate Athletics (NAIA) school, where his older brother, Sam, played. Coleman began his college career as a safety his first three years before being converted to the linebacker position as a senior, earning all conference honors. Coleman set school records with 22 career interceptions and 8 interceptions in a single season. He became the first player from Central Arkansas drafted in the NFL when the Redskins chose him in the 11th round of the 1979 NFL draft with the 289th overall selection.

== Professional career ==
Coleman played for the Redskins in parts of three decades: the 1970s, the 1980s, and the 1990s. On the all-time list of games played as a Redskin, Coleman ranks currently second having played in 217 games, Darrell Green is first. He is one of only three men to have played for at least 16 seasons with the franchise, along with quarterback Sammy Baugh (16) and Green (20). Coleman's 56.5 sacks are the team's fourth-highest all-time total.

Coleman played in the Super Bowl four times, winning three: Super Bowl XVII, Super Bowl XVIII, Super Bowl XXII, and Super Bowl XXVI.

=== NFL statistics ===
- Number: 51
- Sacks: 43.5
- Interceptions: 17
- Touchdowns: 3

== Coaching career ==
Coleman was employed at the University of Arkansas at Pine Bluff as a linebacker coach and team chaplain. On November 26, 2007, Coleman was named head football coach at the university. On December 8, 2012, Coleman coached the Arkansas–Pine Bluff to a Southwestern Athletic Conference (SWAC) conference championship by defeating Jackson State, 24–21, in the SWAC Championship Game at Birmingham, Alabama. The same year, the team won a Historically Black Colleges and Universities national championship in 2012 following a 10-2 record.

== Personal life and death ==
Coleman lived in Pine Bluff, Arkansas, with his wife, Yvette, and their three children. His son, Kyle, had two stints each playing for the Seattle Seahawks and Los Angeles Chargers, although each time was either a preseason or practice squad stint.

Coleman died on April 26, 2026, aged 68.

== Honors ==
- All-Madden Team (1993).
- He was selected by Washingtonian Magazine as the Washingtonian of the Year in 1996.
- Arkansas Sports Hall of Fame (1998).
- In 2003, he was named one of the 70 Greatest Redskins.
- Elijah Pitts Award (named after the Conway, Arkansas, native and Green Bay Packer legend) as Conway's athletic lifetime achievement.
- Washington Redskins Ring of Fame (December 20, 2015).

== Head coaching record ==
Year	Team	Overall	Conference	Standing	Bowl/playoffs
Arkansas–Pine Bluff Golden Lions (Southwestern Athletic Conference) (2008–2017)
2008	Arkansas–Pine Bluff	3–9	2–5	4th (West)	
2009	Arkansas–Pine Bluff	5–5	3–4	T–4th (West)	
2010	Arkansas–Pine Bluff	5–6	4–5	4th (West)	
2011	Arkansas–Pine Bluff	6–5	5–4	T–2nd (West)	
2012	Arkansas–Pine Bluff	10–2	8–1	1st (West)	W SWAC Championship Game
2013	Arkansas–Pine Bluff	2–9	2–7	T–3rd (West)	
2014	Arkansas–Pine Bluff	4–7	3–6	T–4th (West)	
2015	Arkansas–Pine Bluff	2–9	1–8	5th (West)	
2016	Arkansas–Pine Bluff	1–10	1–8	5th (West)	
2017	Arkansas–Pine Bluff	2–9	1–6	5th (West)	
Arkansas–Pine Bluff:		40–71	27–57		
Total:		40–71			
