= Mid-South Association of Non-Public Schools =

Defunct association of segregation academies

The Mid-South Association of Non-Public Schools (MANS) was an organization of segregation academies in Arkansas and Tennessee. Founding members included Bellaire Academy at Dermott, Central Baptist Academy of West Memphis, Tabernacle Academy, Edgewood Academy, England Academy, Hughes Academy in Hughes, Jefferson Preparatory School in Pine Bluff, Watson Chapel Academy, Montrose Academy, Pulaski Academy and Southeast Academy at Gould, as well as two Memphis schools, Frayser Academy and Hughes Academy. It was founded in 1973.
