= Watson Chapel, Pine Bluff, Arkansas =

Neighborhood in Pine Bluff, Arkansas

Watson Chapel
- Neighborhood of Pine Bluff, Arkansas
- Interactive map of Watson Chapel
- Coordinates: 34°11′21.4″N 92°03′56.5″W
- Country: United States
- State: Arkansas
- City: Pine Bluff
- Named after: Rev. Benjamin Watson
- Elevation: 240 ft (73 m)
- Time zone: UTC-6 (Central (CST))
  - Summer (DST): UTC-5 (CDT)
- ZIP code: 71603
- Area code: 870
- FIPS code: 05-73580
- GNIS feature ID: 58837
- Highways: U.S. Route 79; Highway 54

Watson Chapel is a neighborhood in Pine Bluff, Arkansas. It is located at the fork of U.S. Route 79 (Camden Road) and Highway 54 (Sulphur Springs Road), directly southwest of downtown Pine Bluff.

== History ==
Watson Chapel was named after Cumberland Presbyterian minister Benjamin Watson, who settled in nearby Sulphur Springs in the 1870s. Watson later in 1872 founded a church and school which were named Good Faith church and later in 1876 changed to Watson's Chapel Cumberland Presbyterian Church. On April 5, 1880, the school district was formed, with the school still meeting in Rev. Benjamin Watson's church until a separate school building was erected in 1898.

== Education ==
Watson Chapel is served by the Watson Chapel School District, including Watson Chapel High School. The Pine Bluff and Jefferson County Library System operates the Watson Chapel Dave Burdick Library, near the high school and along U.S. Route 79. Its namesake is the library director from 1991 to 2012.
