= White Hall, Arkansas =

City in the United States

- City
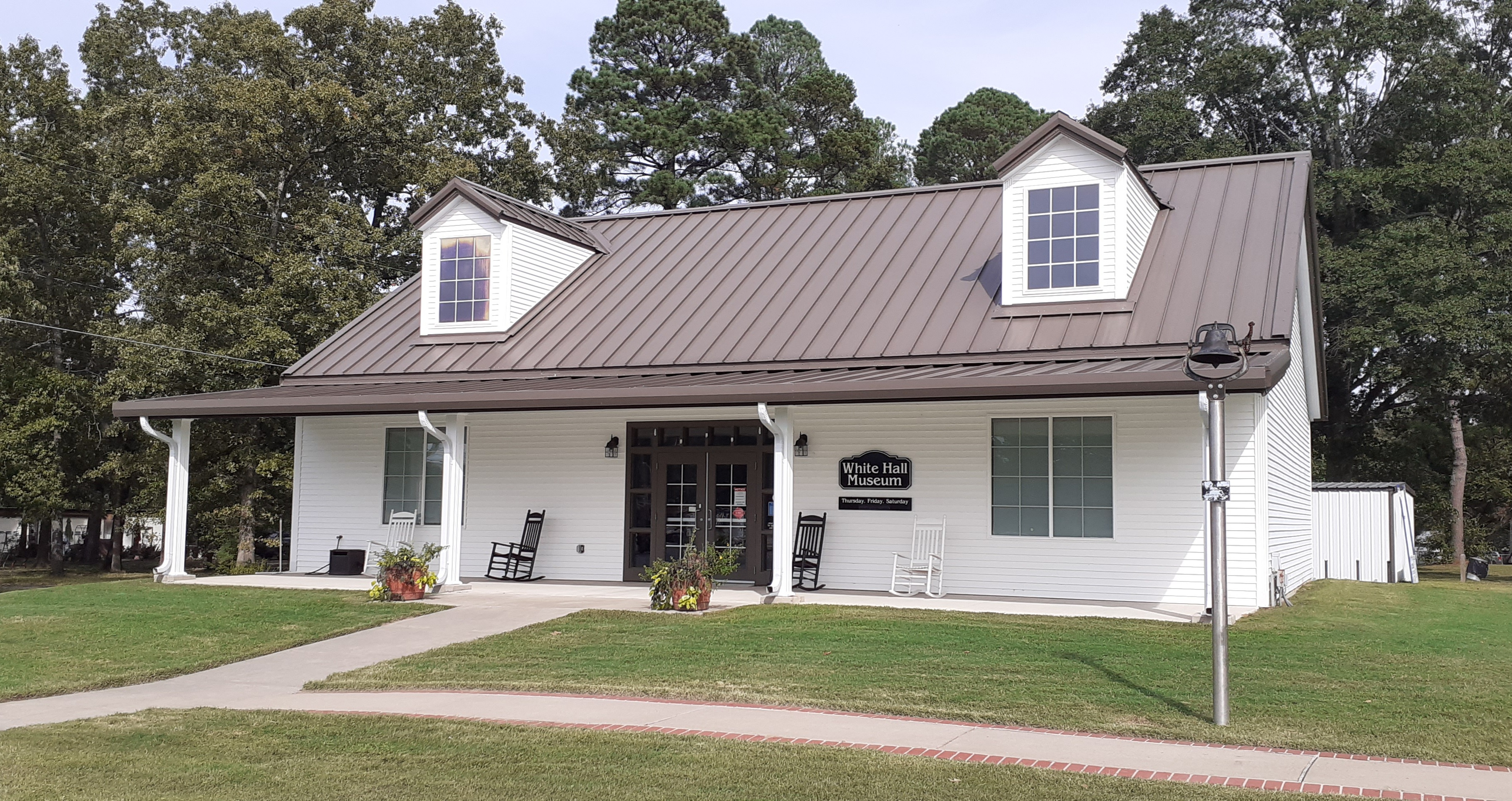
- Main façade of the White Hall Museum

- Location in Jefferson County and Arkansas

- Location in the United States
- Coordinates: 34°15′30″N 92°05′54″W
- Country: United States
- State: Arkansas
- County: Jefferson
- Township: Washington
- Incorporated: October 29, 1964 (61 years ago)

Government
  - Mayor: (I)
  - Council: City Council

Area
  - City: 7.15 sq mi (18.51 km^{2})
  - Land: 7.07 sq mi (18.30 km^{2})
  - Water: 0.081 sq mi (0.21 km^{2})
- Elevation: 299 ft (91 m)

Population (2020)
  - City: 5,581
  - Estimate (2025): 5,532 ▼
  - Density: 790.0/sq mi (305.03/km^{2})
  - Metro: 74,810
- Time zone: UTC−06:00 (CST)
  - Summer (DST): UTC−05:00 (CDT)
- ZIP code: 71602, 71612
- Area code: 870
- FIPS code: 05-75170
- GNIS feature ID: 2405731
- Major airport: Clinton National (LIT)
- Website: whitehallar.org

White Hall is a city in Washington Township, located in Jefferson County, Arkansas, United States. As of the 2020 census, White Hall had a population of 5,581. It is included in the Pine Bluff Micropolitan Statistical Area and the greater Little Rock-North Little Rock Combined Statistical Area. White Hall is home to the Pine Bluff Arsenal.

== Demographics ==
Historical population
Census	Pop.	Note	%±
1970	1,300		—
1980	2,214		70.3%
1990	3,849		73.8%
2000	4,732		22.9%
2010	5,526		16.8%
2020	5,581		1.0%
2025 (est.)	5,532	▼	−0.9%
U.S. Decennial Census

=== Racial and ethnic composition ===
White Hall city, Arkansas – Racial and ethnic composition Note: the US Census treats Hispanic/Latino as an ethnic category. This table excludes Latinos from the racial categories and assigns them to a separate category. Hispanics/Latinos may be of any race.
Race / Ethnicity (NH = Non-Hispanic)	Pop 2000	Pop 2010	Pop 2020	% 2000	% 2010	% 2020
White alone (NH)	4,345	4,584	3,931	91.82%	82.95%	70.44%
Black or African American alone (NH)	220	584	1,027	4.65%	10.57%	18.40%
Native American or Alaska Native alone (NH)	20	17	24	0.42%	0.31%	0.43%
Asian alone (NH)	62	207	266	1.31%	3.75%	4.77%
Native Hawaiian or Pacific Islander alone (NH)	0	2	27	0.00%	0.04%	0.48%
Other race alone (NH)	5	3	27	0.11%	0.05%	0.48%
Mixed race or Multiracial (NH)	31	51	152	0.66%	0.92%	2.72%
Hispanic or Latino (any race)	49	78	127	1.04%	1.41%	2.28%
Total	4,732	5,526	5,581	100.00%	100.00%	100.00%

=== 2020 census ===
As of the 2020 census, White Hall had a population of 5,581. The median age was 40.9 years. 23.0% of residents were under the age of 18 and 18.8% of residents were 65 years of age or older. For every 100 females there were 88.0 males, and for every 100 females age 18 and over there were 85.9 males age 18 and over.

93.1% of residents lived in urban areas, while 6.9% lived in rural areas.

There were 2,221 households in White Hall, of which 32.7% had children under the age of 18 living in them. Of all households, 51.3% were married-couple households, 14.2% were households with a male householder and no spouse or partner present, and 30.0% were households with a female householder and no spouse or partner present. About 25.9% of all households were made up of individuals and 11.0% had someone living alone who was 65 years of age or older.

There were 2,367 housing units, of which 6.2% were vacant. The homeowner vacancy rate was 1.6% and the rental vacancy rate was 5.5%.

=== 2000 census ===
As of the census of 2000, there were 4,732 people in 1,780 households, including 1,418 families, in the city. The population density was 692.1 inhabitants per square mile (267.2/km^{2}). There were 1,925 housing units at an average density of 281.6 units per square mile (108.7 units/km^{2}). The racial makeup of the city was 92.54% White, 4.65% Black or African American, 0.49% Native American, 1.31% Asian, 0.34% from other races, and 0.68% from two or more races. 1.04% of the population were Hispanic or Latino of any race.

Of the 1,780 households 39.9% had children under the age of 18 living with them, 66.5% were married couples living together, 9.7% had a female householder with no husband present, and 20.3% were non-families. 18.0% of households were one person and 6.6% were one person aged 65 or older. The average household size was 2.66 and the average family size was 3.02.

The age distribution was 27.5% under the age of 18, 6.9% from 18 to 24, 29.5% from 25 to 44, 26.1% from 45 to 64, and 10.0% 65 or older. The median age was 37 years. For every 100 females, there were 93.8 males. For every 100 females age 18 and over, there were 91.7 males.

The median household income was $52,045 and the median family income was $56,997. Males had a median income of $38,286 versus $26,827 for females. The per capita income for the city was $20,524. About 5.5% of families and 6.5% of the population were below the poverty line, including 9.4% of those under age 18 and 8.9% of those age 65 or over.

== Economy ==
White Hall has the second highest median household income in Arkansas (after Maumelle).

== Arts and culture ==
The Pine Bluff and Jefferson County Library System operates the White Hall Dr. Cora Economos Library, which is in proximity to the White Hall City Park. Its namesake is the former director of libraries of the library system.

== Education ==
All of White Hall is served by the White Hall School District. White Hall High School is the zoned high school of the district.

== See also ==
- List of municipalities in Arkansas
- National Register of Historic Places listings in Jefferson County, Arkansas
