= Redfield School Historic District =

Historic district in Arkansas, United States

- U.S. National Register of Historic Places
- U.S. Historic district
- Location within Arkansas
- Location: 101 School St., Redfield, Arkansas
- Coordinates: 34°26′54.8″N 92°11′06.5″W
- Area: 8 acres (3.2 ha)
- Built: 1910s–1958
- Architect: multiple
- NRHP reference No.: 14000791
- Added to NRHP: October 1, 2014

The Redfield School Historic District is an historic district that encompasses the Depression-era school complex at 101 School Street in Redfield, Arkansas. It is owned and managed by the nonprofit Friends of Redfield School Historic District. The district was listed on the National Register of Historic Places in 2014.

== History ==
The first school on this site was a log school built in 1882. Later, a frame school was built and then replaced in 1914 with a two-story brick school and it was torn down to build the Works Progress Administration school. The school, built in 1939 with funding from the WPA, was the only project of the New Deal in Redfield.

== Buildings and sites ==
The main building of the Redfield School Historic District is an H-shaped single-story brick building, 15,000 sq ft, with a dormered gable roof. Additional buildings include a carriage house and well house dating to the 1910s. The district includes a 1958 mid-century modern gable-roofed cinder block school gymnasium, 10,391 sq ft, with all wood interior including Glulam wooden beams made in Magnolia, Arkansas. It also includes the athletic fields that lie adjacent to the school building.

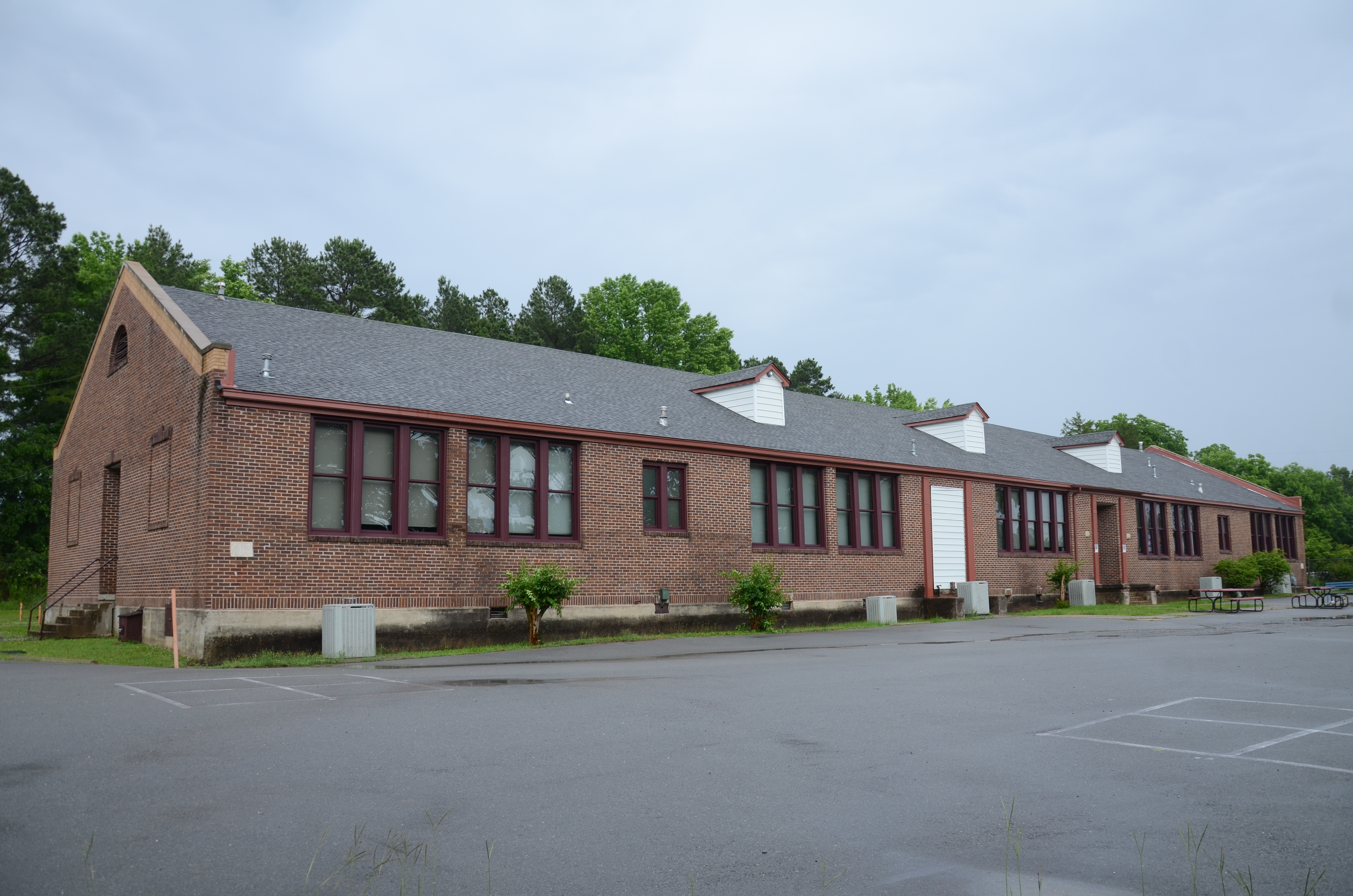
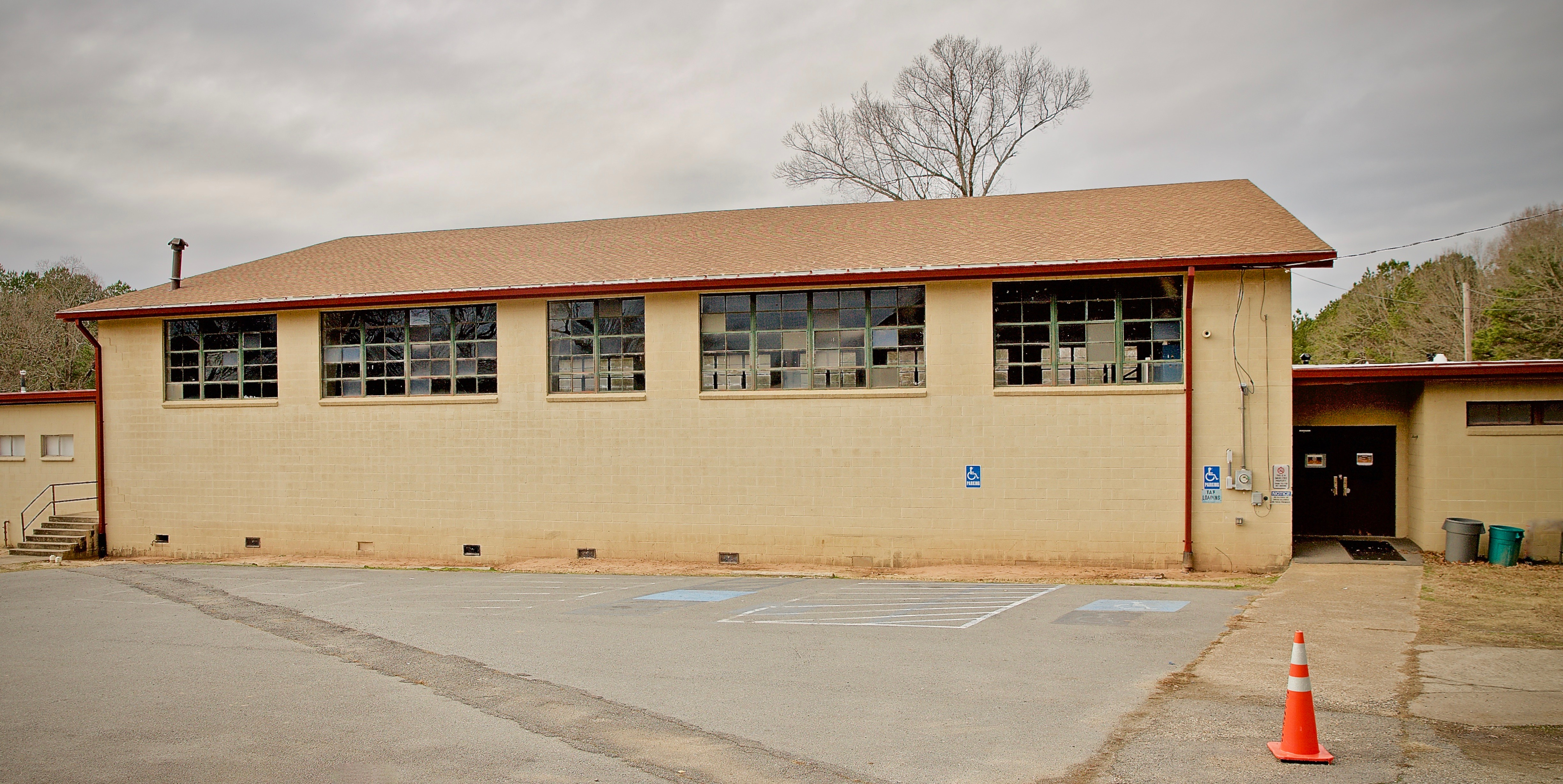
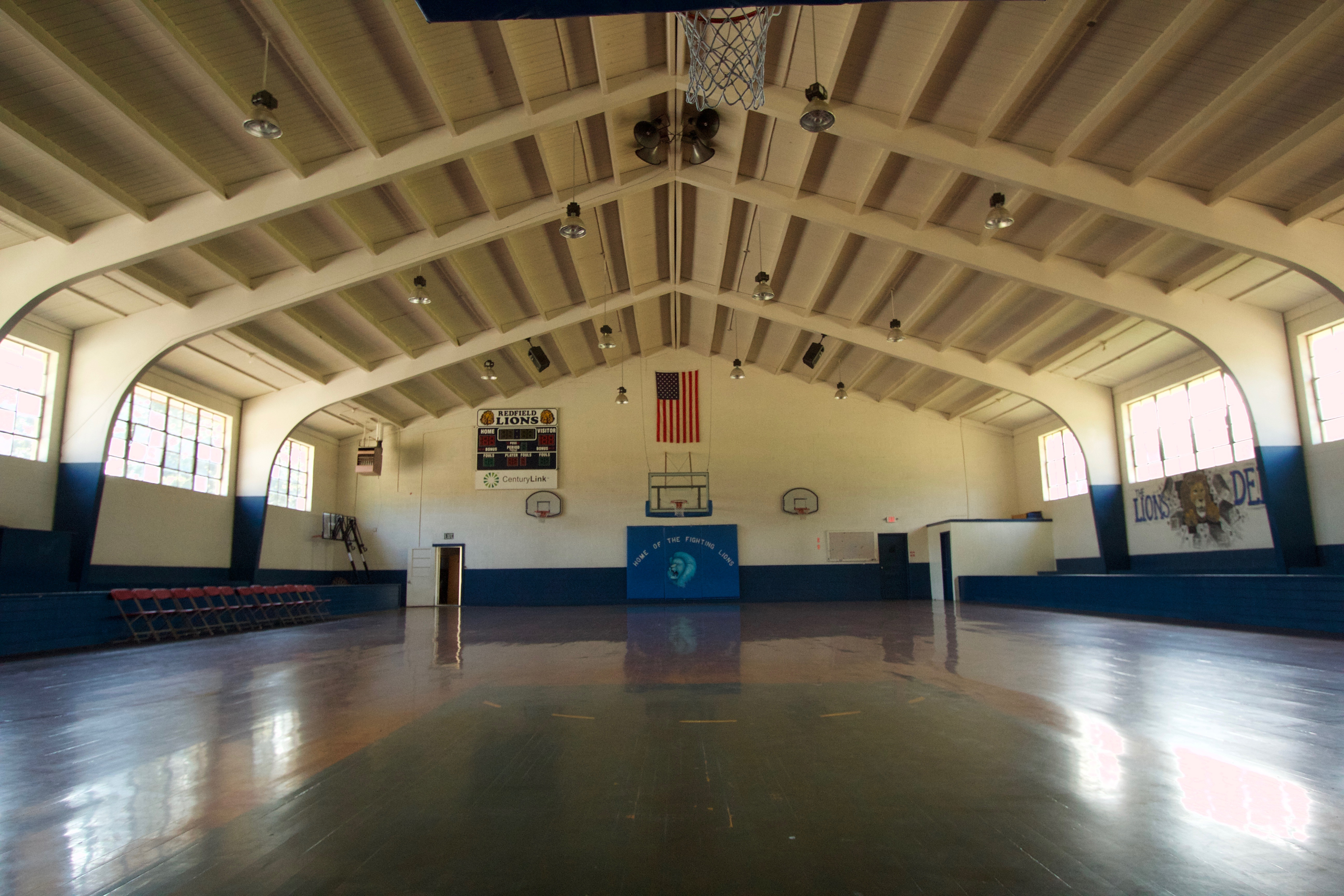
Main façade of the school	Main façade of the gymnasium	Interior of the gymnasium

== See also ==
- National Register of Historic Places listings in Jefferson County, Arkansas
