= White Hall School District =

School district in Arkansas

Address
- 1020 West Holland Avenue White Hall, Arkansas, 71602-9572; United States
- Coordinates: 34°17′08″N 92°06′26″W

District information
- Type: Public
- Grades: K through 12th Grade
- Superintendent: Gary Williams
- Accreditation: AdvancED
- Schools: Elementary 4 Middle 1 High 1
- NCES District ID: 0514140

Other information
- Schedule: M-F except state holidays
- Website: whitehallsd.org

White Hall School District (WHSD) is a public school district in northwest Jefferson County, Arkansas, United States. The district employs approximately 400 faculty members and staff to provide educational programs for students ranging from kindergarten through twelve grade. It currently serves more than 3,000 students. All schools in the White Hall School District are accredited by AdvancED (North Central Association of Colleges and Schools).

The district is headquartered in the Julius S. Brown Administration Building in White Hall. The district serves White Hall and a portion of Pine Bluff. It boundaries include the Jefferson County Industrial Park. In addition to White Hall and portions of Pine Bluff, the district also serves Redfield, and Jefferson.

== History ==
Initially the Dollarway School District (DSD) sent older white students to White Hall High School and other area high schools, as it did not have its own high school for white students nor one for black students. In 1957 DSD opened its own high school for white children, Dollarway High School. In 1979 the Jefferson County School District dissolved, with a portion of the students going to the White Hall school district.

For a period of time the number of students increased. From the 2007-2008 school year to the 2008-2009 school year, the number of students fell by 82. This reflected economic problems in the Arkansas Delta region, meant that the population was down to levels circa 1998 and was the largest decrease thus far in the period 2004-2009.

In 2017 Jack Foster, a former alderman of the City of Pine Bluff, argued that the setup of the WHSD boundaries is preventing the DSD from getting necessary funding. The superintendent of WHSD, Larry Smith, stated that Foster's criticism was based on a misunderstanding as the state government had determined the school district boundaries, not the districts themselves.

== Schools ==
Secondary schools:

- White Hall High School
- White Hall Middle School

Elementary schools:

- Ida Mae Gandy Elementary School
- M. A. Hardin Elementary School (Redfield)
- Moody Elementary School
- Taylor Elementary School

== See also ==
- Arkansas Department of Education
- No Child Left Behind Act of 2001
- Rehabilitation Act of 1973
