= Samuel H. Scott (politician) =

American lawyer and politician

1885 House of Representatives composite photo of the Twenty-Fifth General Assembly of the State of Arkansas

Samuel H. Scott was a lawyer and state legislator in Arkansas. He served in the Arkansas House of Representatives in 1885 representing Jefferson County, Arkansas. In 1885 he represented the county along with Ed Glover (politician) and William B. Jacko in the state house. He was African American and served with several other African Americans in the House in 1885.

The caption of a composite photograph of 1885 representatives in Arkansas lists him as a Republican, Methodist, lawyer, who lived in Pine Bluff and was born in New York. It states he had lived in Arkansas for 5 years.

== See also ==
- African American officeholders from the end of the Civil War until before 1900
