= Watson Chapel School District =

School district in Arkansas

Coordinates: 34.1895°N 92.0664°W

Location
- 4000 Camden Road; Pine Bluff, Arkansas 71603-9094

District information
- Type: Public (government funded)
- Grades: K–12
- Schools: 5
- NCES District ID: 0513930

Students and staff
- Students: 2215
- Teachers: 208
- Student–teacher ratio: 14.85

Other information
- Website: Watson Chapel School District

Watson Chapel School District No. 24 (WCSD) is a public school district serving the communities of Pine Bluff (including Watson Chapel) and Sulphur Springs within Jefferson County, Arkansas, United States. Headquartered in Pine Bluff, Watson Chapel School District employs over 300 faculty and staff to provide educational programs for students ranging from kindergarten through twelfth grade and enrolls more than 2,200 students.

In 1971 the district covered 125 square miles (320 km^{2}) of land.

All schools in the district are accredited by AdvancED (formerly the North Central Association of Colleges and Schools).

== History ==
Initially the Dollarway School District (DSD) sent older white students to Watson Chapel High School and other area high schools, as it did not have its own high school for white students nor one for black students. In 1957 DSD opened its own high school for white children, Dollarway High School.

District Court for Eastern District of Arkansas judge Oren Harris, in 1971, ordered the Watson Chapel School Board to desegregate schools. Prior to that order black students largely attended two schools while white students attended four of them. Under the judge's orders there would be a single high school, Watson Chapel High School, a single middle school, the former Coleman High School/Coleman Elementary School, and four elementary schools.

In 1979 the Jefferson County School District dissolved, with a portion of the students going to the Watson Chapel school district.

In 2007, the ACLU sued the school district because the dress code allegedly denied students their first amendment rights.

== Schools ==
- Watson Chapel High School : Grades 10-12
- Watson Chapel Junior High School : Grades 7-9
- Coleman Intermediate School : Grades 4-6
- L. L. Owen Elementary School : Grades 2-3
  - In the 1969–1970 school year it had 593 white students and 36 black students.
- Edgewood Elementary School : Grades K-1
  - In the 1969–1970 school year it had 495 white students and 19 black students.

Closed

- Coleman High School (school for black children)
- Coleman Elementary School (school for black children)
- Sulphur Springs Elementary School
  - In the 1969–1970 school year it had 75 students, all white. A court document called it a rural school.

== Demographics ==
It had 3,871 students in the 1969–1970 school year, with more than half within the city limits of Pine Bluff. That year the four schools for white children had 2,135 white students and 96 black students; the two schools for black children had 1,640 students, with all being black.

In 1971 the schools had 3,750 students, with about 45% of them being black.

== Notable alumni ==
- Kevin Willians Former NFL Defensive back from 1998 to 2002
- Dante Wesley Former NFL defensive back from 2002 to 2010
