= Ed Glover (politician) =

American politician

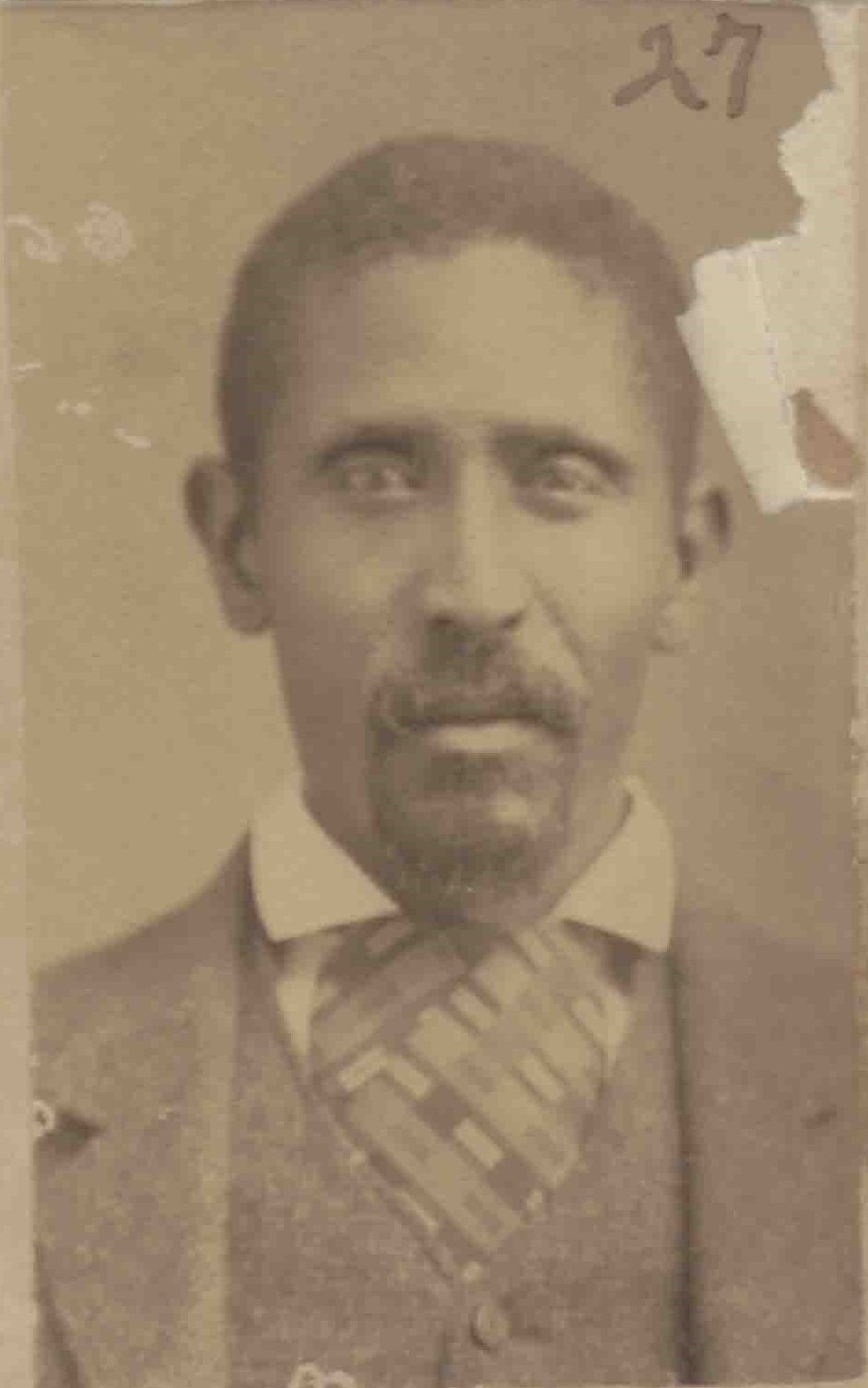
Ed Glover - Arkansas 1885

Ed Glover was a state legislator in Arkansas. He represented Jefferson County, Arkansas in the Arkansas House of Representatives in 1885. He was a Republican, representing Jefferson County, Arkansas.

He was a Kentucky native, originally a farmer, a Baptist and had been resident in Arkansas for 9 years when elected in 1955 aged 36.

1885 House of Representatives composite photo of the Twenty-Fifth General Assembly of the State of Arkansas

His fellow representatives from Jefferson County in 1885 were W. B. Jacko and S. H. Scott, elected September 1, 1884.
