= Pine Bluff and Jefferson County Library System =

Public library system in Jefferson County, Arkansas

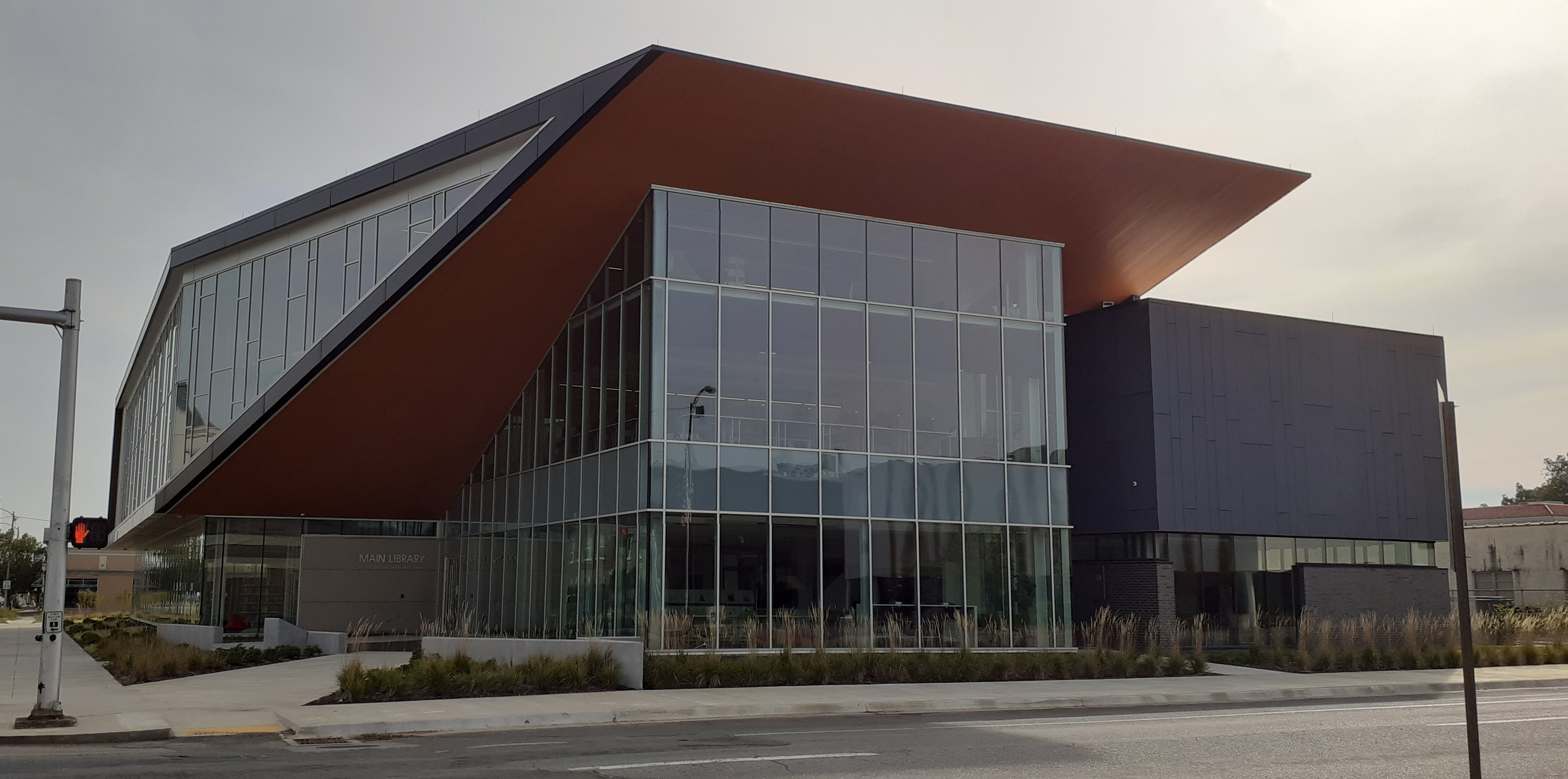
- Northeast façade of the Main Library
- 34°13′25″N 92°00′13″W
- Location: 600 South Main Street, Pine Bluff, Arkansas, U.S.
- Type: Public library system
- Established: 1979 (47 years ago)
- Reference to legal mandate: Interlocal Agreement between the City of Pine Bluff and Jefferson County creating the "Pine Bluff and Jefferson County Library System" (August 1979)
- Service area: Jefferson County, Arkansas
- Branches: Altheimer Public Library; Cothran Memorial Library; Dave Burdick Library; Dr. Cora Economos Library

Collection
- Items collected: Books, journals, newspapers, magazines, official publications, sheet music, sound and music recordings, databases, maps, postage stamps, prints, drawings, manuscripts and media.
- Size: 100,000 (2016)

Access and use
- Access requirements: Reading rooms – free.
- Population served: 77,000 (2016)

Other information
- Director: Ricky Williams
- Website: pineblufflibrary.org

The Pine Bluff and Jefferson County Library System (PBJCLS) is a public library system in Jefferson County, Arkansas, with the main library at Pine Bluff. It is housed in five buildings in the county. Its functions are overseen by the Pine Bluff and Jefferson County Library System Board of Trustees.

== History ==
In 1979, an interlocal agreement was established between the City of Pine Bluff and Jefferson County, creating the Pine Bluff and Jefferson County Library System. A proposal to make a $16 million bond, funded by a 3 mill increase of property taxes for a 30 year period, was approved by voters in 2016. In 2020 a proposal to increase property taxes by .25-mill for the library branches was approved. The proposal also established a system of curbside service for its branch libraries.

== Main library ==
The Pine Bluff Public Library is located at 600 South Main Street and includes the Ann Lightsey Children's Library; it also maintains the Bill Carr Memorial Room. The main library has an extensive collection of genealogy materials, and more than 20 computers for the public to use, many with Internet access.

The library was established in 1913 as a library association with the generous support of the Pine Bluff Chapter of the Daughters of the American Revolution. In 2016 a flood affected the old library building. Another flood occurred in 2017 due to a faulty pump. The new library opened in 2020 at a cost of $10,500,000. The library building has ~35,000 square feet (3,300 m^{2}) of space.

== Branches ==
=== Altheimer Public Library ===
The Altheimer Public Library is located at 222 South Edline in Altheimer. Established in 2001, it was built on a 1-acre (0.40 ha) tract of land sold by the Altheimer Unified School District to Jefferson County for $3,784. Identical to the Cothran Memorial Library, it has ~3,500 square feet (330 m^{2}) of space.

=== Cothran Memorial Library ===
The Cothran Memorial Library, also known as the Redfield Public Library, is located at 310 South Brodie Street in Redfield. Established in 1999, it is named for Leenita Sue Gober Cothran, a local resident killed in a vehicle accident. The library building has ~3,500 square feet (330 m^{2}) of space.

=== Dave Burdick Library ===
The Dave Burdick Library, also known as the Watson Chapel Public Library, is located at 4120 Camden Road in the Watson Chapel neighborhood of Pine Bluff. It is named for a former library director.

=== Dr. Cora Economos Library ===
The Dr. Cora Economos Library, also known as the White Hall Public Library, is located at 300 Anderson Avenue in White Hall. Established in 1979, it is named for a former library director.
