= Lone Star Baptist Church =

Historic church in Arkansas, United States

- U.S. National Register of Historic Places
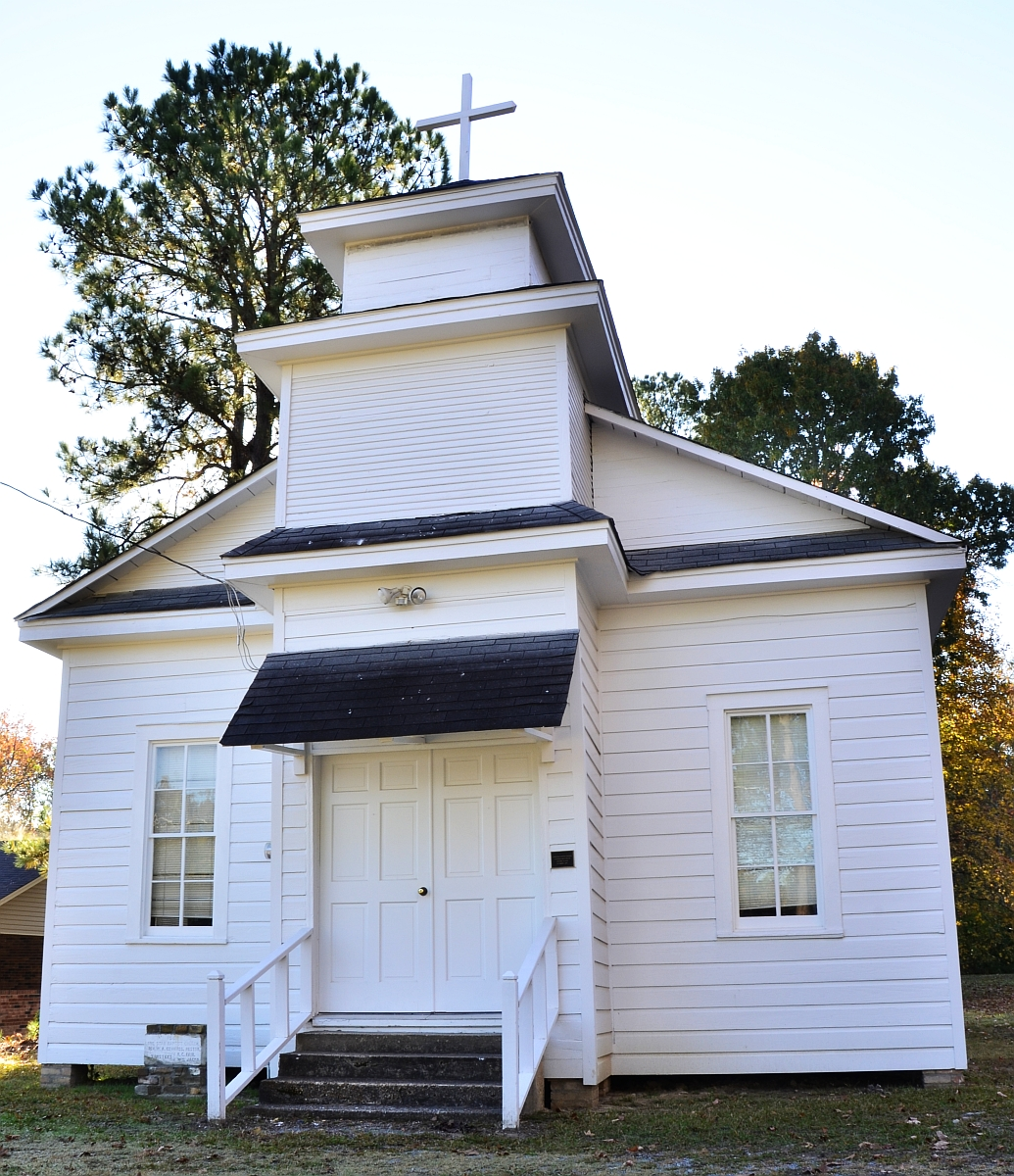
- Main façade of the Lone Star Baptist Church

- Location within Arkansas
- Location: 620 Sheridan Road, Redfield, Arkansas
- Coordinates: 34°26′31.7″N 92°11′16.95″W
- Area: less than one acre
- Built: 1901 (125 years ago)
- Built by: Jake Peoples; J. M. Jacko
- Architectural style: Plain traditional
- NRHP reference No.: 05001076
- Added to NRHP: September 28, 2005

The Lone Star Baptist Church, also known as the Redfield Historical Society Building, is a repurposed building in Redfield, Arkansas. An excellent example of an early-20th-century Baptist church, the exterior is noted for its minimal decoration. It was listed on the U.S. National Register of Historic Places in 2005.

== History ==
A local African-American Baptist congregation formed in 1890, and the church was built in 1901. It was used as a rural school until material became available to build one. The church operated until 1976. Church members deeded the building to the city of Redfield in 1993. The Redfield Historical Society manages the building and it is used for holiday choir performances, private weddings and public tours by appointment.

== See also ==
- National Register of Historic Places listings in Jefferson County, Arkansas
