= Kyle Coleman =

American football player (born 1993)

Profile
- Positions: Linebacker, fullback

Personal information
- Born: September 30, 1993 (age 33); Pine Bluff, Arkansas, U.S.
- Listed height: 6 ft 0 in (1.83 m)
- Listed weight: 231 lb (105 kg)

Career information
- High school: Watson Chapel (AR)
- College: Arkansas–Pine Bluff
- NFL draft: 2016: undrafted

Career history
- Seattle Seahawks (2016–2017)*; Los Angeles Chargers (2017)*; Seattle Seahawks (2017)*; Los Angeles Chargers (2018)*
- * Offseason or practice squad member only

Kyle Coleman (born September 30, 1993) is an American former football linebacker and fullback. He played college football at Arkansas State and Arkansas–Pine Bluff. He is the son of former NFL linebacker Monte Coleman.

== Professional career ==
Pre-draft measurables
Height	Weight	Arm length	Hand span	40-yard dash	10-yard split	20-yard split	20-yard shuttle	Three-cone drill	Vertical jump	Broad jump	Bench press
6 ft 0 5/8 in (1.84 m)	231 lb (105 kg)	31 1/8 in (0.79 m)	10 in (0.25 m)	4.69 s	1.65 s	2.67 s	4.52 s	7.44 s	35.5 in (0.90 m)	9 ft 7 in (2.92 m)	20 reps
All values from Pro Day

=== Seattle Seahawks ===
Coleman signed with the Seattle Seahawks as an undrafted free agent on June 2, 2016. On August 29, 2016, he was waived by the Seahawks.

On May 15, 2017, Coleman was re-signed by the Seahawks. He was waived on August 8, 2017.

=== Los Angeles Chargers ===
On August 15, 2017, Coleman signed with the Los Angeles Chargers. He was waived on September 2, 2017.

=== Seattle Seahawks (second stint) ===
On November 22, 2017, Coleman was signed to the Seattle Seahawks' practice squad, but was released six days later.

=== Los Angeles Chargers (second stint) ===
On August 14, 2018, Coleman signed with the Los Angeles Chargers. He was waived on September 1, 2018.
