= William B. Jacko =

Arkansas legislator

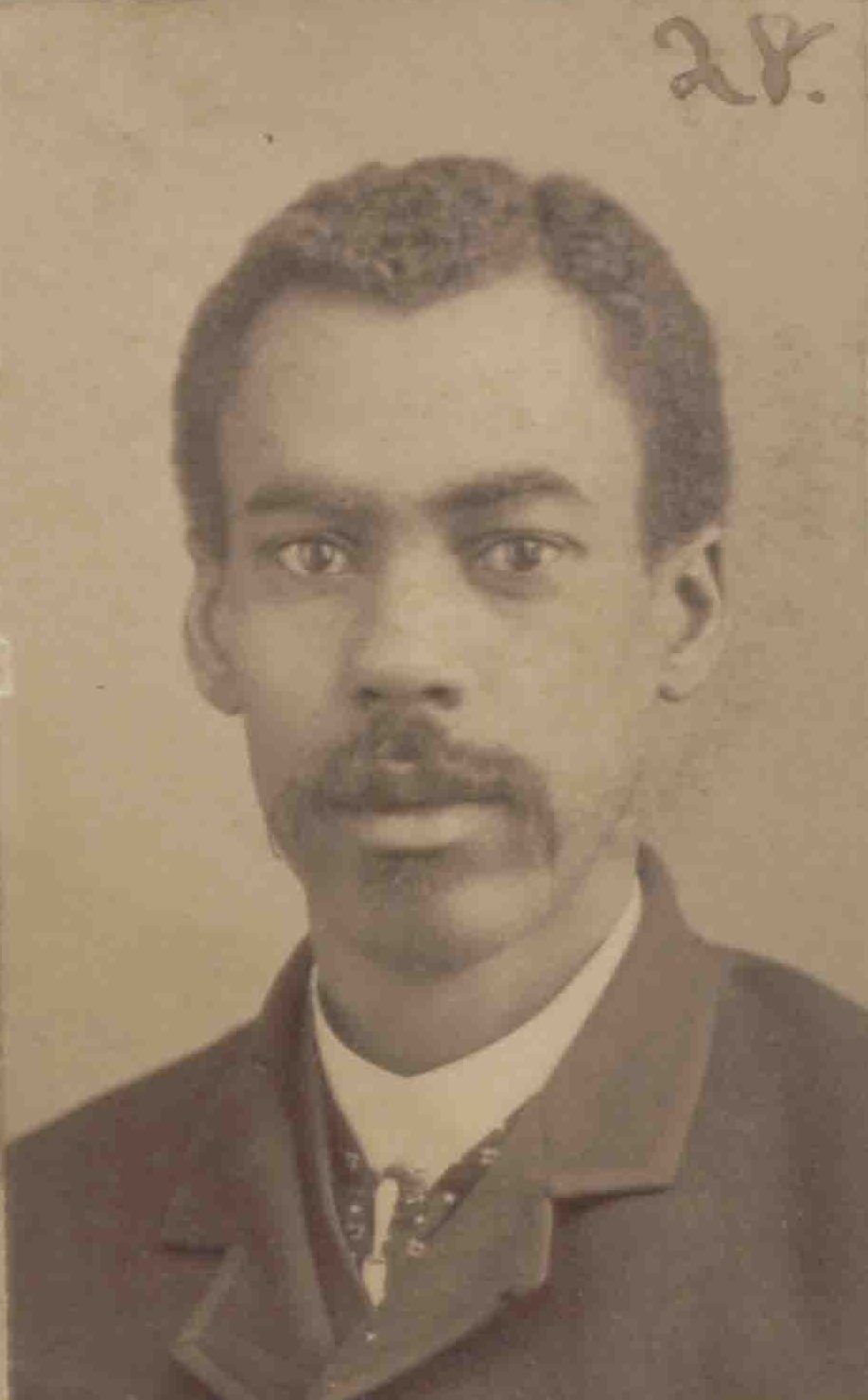
William B. Jacko

1885 House of Representatives composite photo of the Twenty-Fifth General Assembly of the State of Arkansas

William B. Jacko was a state legislator in Arkansas. He served two terms in the Arkansas House of Representatives beginning in 1885.

He, Ed Glover, and S. H. Scott represented Jefferson County, Arkansas. He was re-elected to the 1887 term and served with Ed Jefferson and H. B. Burton.

In a composite photograph of legislators he is documented as a native of Arkansas, a teacher, Republican, Methodist, and from Jefferson Springs.

== See also ==
- African American officeholders from the end of the Civil War until before 1900
