= Redfield Commercial Historic District =

Historic district in Arkansas, United States

- U.S. National Register of Historic Places
- U.S. Historic district
- Location within Arkansas
- Location: 300 and 301 Sheridan Rd., Redfield, Arkansas
- Coordinates: 34.4447°N 92.1844°W
- Area: 1.25 acres (0.51 ha)
- Built: c. 1900
- Architect: multiple
- Architectural style: Early commercial
- NRHP reference No.: 100009339
- Added to NRHP: November 3, 2023

The Redfield Commercial Historic District is a historic district in Redfield, Arkansas, along Sheridan Road. It includes two contributing buildings dating from the early-20th century and one non-contributing building. The two one-story brick buildings were constructed in the early commercial style. It encompasses a portion of the city's central business district, whose historical significance extends from about 1900 to 1972. The district was listed on the National Register of Historic Places in 2023.

== See also ==
- National Register of Historic Places listings in Jefferson County, Arkansas
