= Watson Chapel High School =

Location
- 4000 Camden Road; Pine Bluff, Arkansas 71603; United States; 34°11′19″N 92°4′2″W

Information
- School type: Public
- Motto: Preparing today's students for tomorrow's opportunities
- Founded: 1890 (136 years ago)
- School board: Watson Chapel School District
- NCES District ID: 0513930
- Superintendent: Keith McGee
- CEEB code: 042040
- NCES School ID: 051393001140
- Principal: Jeffrey Neal
- Staff: 47.38 (FTE)
- Grades: 9–12
- Enrollment: 639 (2023-2024)
- Student to teacher ratio: 13.49
- Colors: Black and gold
- Nickname: Wildcats
- Affiliation: Arkansas Activities Association
- Website: www.wcseniorhigh.wcsd.k12.ar.us

Watson Chapel High School is a comprehensive public high school in the Watson Chapel School District in Pine Bluff, Arkansas, that serves grades 10 through 12. It is one of two public high schools in Pine Bluff and the only high school managed by the Watson Chapel School District. It serves as the main feeder school for Watson Chapel Junior High School.

It serves portions of Pine Bluff and Sulphur Springs.

== History ==
Initially the Dollarway School District (DSD) sent older white students to Watson Chapel High and other area high schools, as it did not have its own high school for white students nor one for black students. In 1957 DSD opened its own high school for white children, Dollarway High School.

In the 1969-1970 school year the high school had 972 white students and 41 black students. It was previously reserved for white students. District Court for Eastern District of Arkansas judge Oren Harris, in 1971, ordered the Watson Chapel School Board to desegregate schools. All high school students were moved to Watson Chapel High while the former Coleman High School/Coleman Elementary School, previously for black students, was to become a combined middle school.

From 2006 to 2007 the number of students fell by 100, and from 2007 to 2008 they fell by 18. This reflected economic problems in the Arkansas Delta.

In 2018 the State of Arkansas put the school's accreditation on a probationary status.

== Academics ==
Watson Chapel is accredited by Arkansas Department of Education (ADE) and has been accredited by AdvancED (formerly North Central Association) since 1963.

=== Curriculum ===
The assumed course of study is the Smart Core curriculum developed by the Arkansas Department of Education. Students may engage in regular (core and career focus) and may select Advanced Placement (AP) coursework and exams that provide an opportunity for college credit prior to graduation.

== Athletics ==
The Watson Chapel High School mascot is the wildcat with school colors of black and gold.

For 2012–14, the Watson Chapel Wildcats participate in the 5A South Conference for interscholastic activities administered by the Arkansas Activities Association (AAA) including baseball, basketball (boys/girls), cheer, dance, cross country, football, golf (boys/girls), softball, and track and field.

The Wildcats baseball team has made 28 appearances to the state tournament, with 39 tournament wins, 13 semifinals, and seven finals; winning four titles between 1988 and 2000. The boys' basketball team has won three state championships as well.

In 2013, Watson Chapel won the state's Student Angler Federation (SAF) High School Fishing State Championship.

== Notable alumni ==
- Kyle Coleman, American football fullback and linebacker for the Seattle Seahawks
- Johnnie Harris, basketball coach
- Dante Wesley, an American football cornerback for the Carolina Panthers of the National Football League.
- Kevin Williams, former American football defensive back for the New York Jets, Miami Dolphins and Houston Texans.
- Dr. Chris Jones, former Democratic Party Nominee for Governor of Arkansas in the 2022 Arkansas Gubernatorial election.
