= Redfield, Arkansas =

City in Arkansas, United States

- City
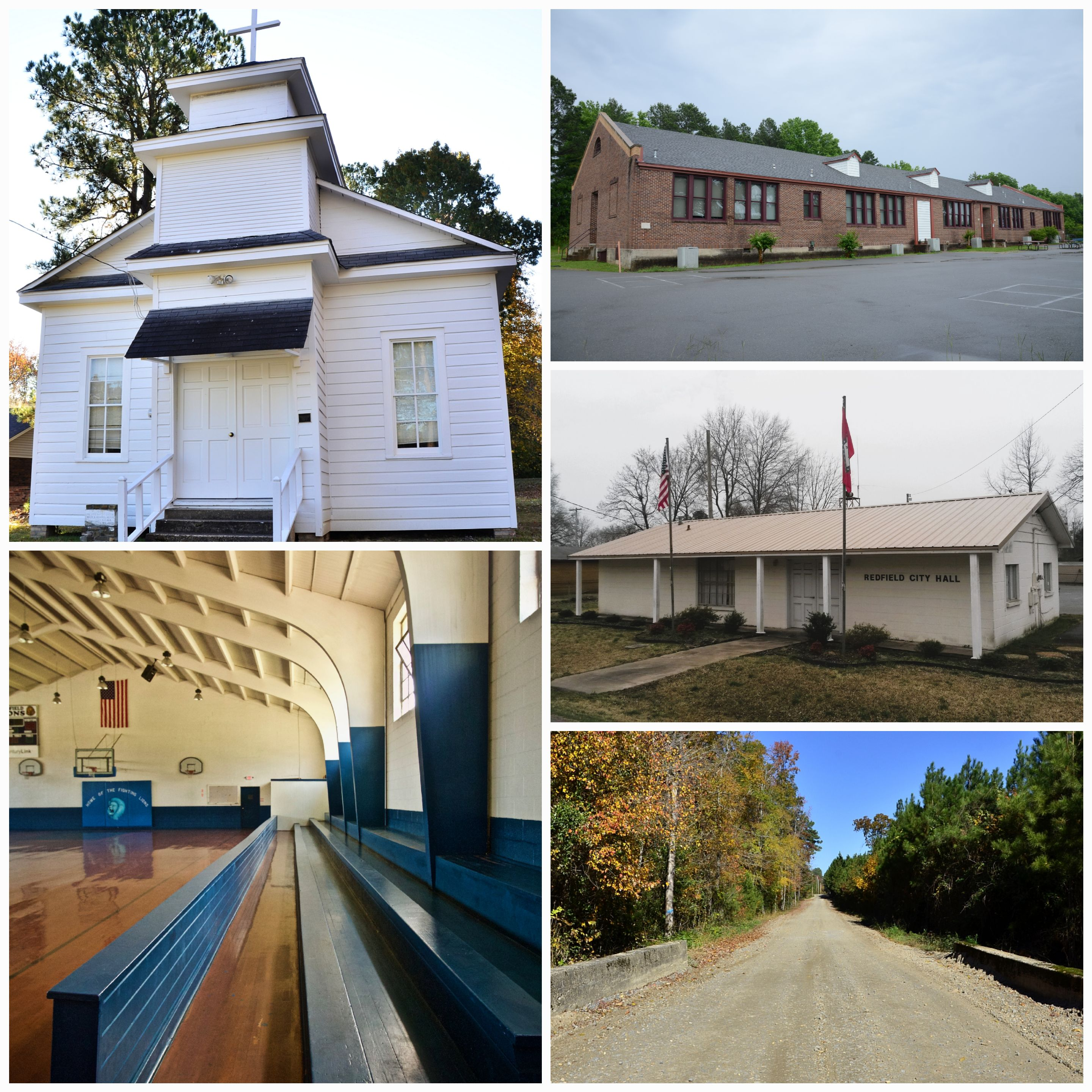
- Clockwise from top: The Old Redfield School, Redfield City Hall, the Dollarway Road, Redfield Gymnasium, and the Lone Star Baptist Church

- Location in Jefferson County and Arkansas

- Location in the United States
- Coordinates: 34°26′34″N 92°11′04″W
- Country: United States
- State: Arkansas
- County: Jefferson
- Township: Barraque
- Founded: December 20, 1880
- Incorporated: October 18, 1898
- Founder: James K. Brodie
- Named for: Jared E. Redfield

Government
  - Type: Mayor–Council
  - Mayor: Roben K. Brooks (I)
  - Council: City Council

Area
  - Total: 3.15 sq mi (8.15 km^{2})
  - Land: 3.09 sq mi (8.01 km^{2})
  - Water: 0.054 sq mi (0.14 km^{2})
- Elevation: 302 ft (92 m)

Population (2020)
  - Total: 1,505
  - Estimate (2025): 1,492 ▼
  - Density: 486.5/sq mi (187.84/km^{2})
- Time zone: UTC–6 (CST)
  - Summer (DST): UTC–5 (CDT)
- ZIP code: 72132
- Area code: 501
- FIPS code: 05-58580
- GNIS feature ID: 58477, 2404603
- Highways: Interstate 530; U.S. Highway 65; Highway 46; Highway 365
- Major airport: Clinton National Airport (LIT)
- Website: redfieldar.com

Redfield, officially the City of Redfield, is a small city in Jefferson County, Arkansas, United States. Located about 24 miles (39 km) southeast of Little Rock, the city is part of the Pine Bluff, Arkansas, Micropolitan Statistical Area. The population was 1,505 in the 2020 census.

What is now Redfield was formerly part of the Quapaw Nation. Founded in 1880 by James K. Brodie, a 19th-century businessman; it was named for Jared E. Redfield, president of the Little Rock, Mississippi River and Texas Railway. It is home to two U.S. historic preservation districts.

== History ==
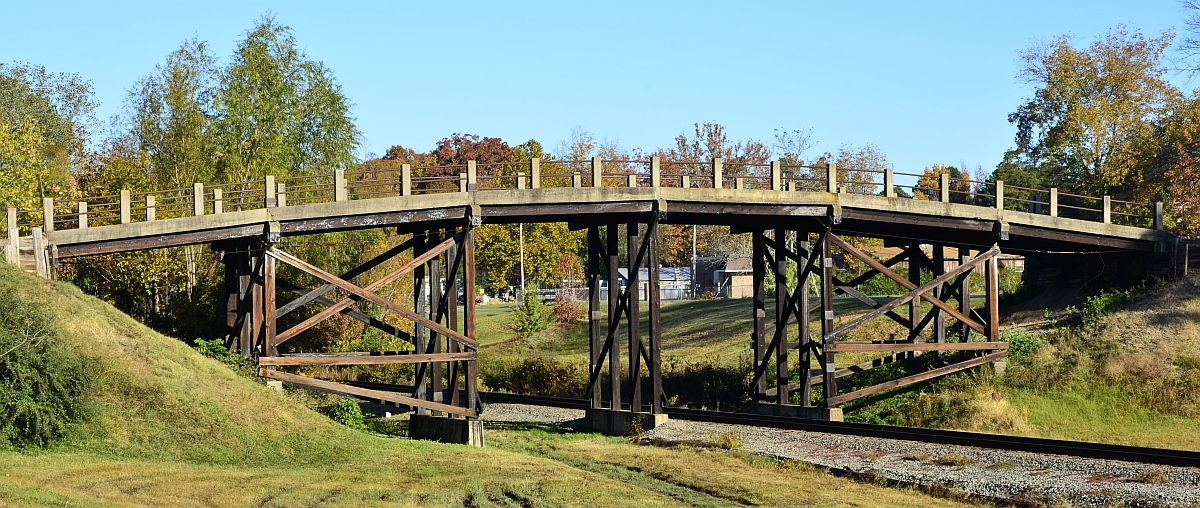
West James Street Overpass – listed on NRHP May 18, 1995

Following the arrival of the Little Rock, Mississippi River and Texas Railway, also known as the "Arkansas Valley Route," a small settlement grew up around the new station named for company president Jared E. Redfield of Essex, Connecticut. Founded on December 20, 1880, Redfield was incorporated by the Jefferson county court on October 18, 1898.

Six local properties have been added to the National Register of Historic Places (NRHP): Dollarway Road (1974), West James Street Overpass (1995), Lone Star Baptist Church (2005), Redfield School Historic District (2014), and Redfield Commercial Historic District (2023).

== Geography ==
According to the United States Census Bureau, the city has a total area of 3.148 square miles (8.15 km^{2}), of which, 3.094 square miles (8.01 km^{2}) of it is land and 0.37% is water.

== Demographics ==
Historical population
Census	Pop.	Note	%±
1890	400		—
1900	333		−16.7%
1910	278		−16.5%
1920	296		6.5%
1930	350		18.2%
1940	339		−3.1%
1950	291		−14.2%
1960	242		−16.8%
1970	277		14.5%
1980	745		169.0%
1990	1,082		45.2%
2000	1,157		6.9%
2010	1,297		12.1%
2020	1,505		16.0%
2025 (est.)	1,492	▼	−0.9%
U.S. Decennial Census

=== Racial and ethnic composition ===
Redfield city, Arkansas – Racial and ethnic composition Note: the US Census treats Hispanic/Latino as an ethnic category. This table excludes Latinos from the racial categories and assigns them to a separate category. Hispanics/Latinos may be of any race.
Race / Ethnicity (NH = Non-Hispanic)	Pop 2000	Pop 2010	Pop 2020	% 2000	% 2010	% 2020
White alone (NH)	1,061	1,171	1,163	91.70%	90.29%	77.28%
Black or African American alone (NH)	34	62	213	2.94%	4.78%	14.15%
Native American or Alaska Native alone (NH)	2	1	5	0.17%	0.08%	0.33%
Asian alone (NH)	17	7	13	1.47%	0.54%	0.86%
Native Hawaiian or Pacific Islander alone (NH)	1	0	3	0.09%	0.00%	0.20%
Other race alone (NH)	0	3	4	0.00%	0.23%	0.27%
Mixed race or Multiracial (NH)	14	30	60	1.21%	2.31%	3.99%
Hispanic or Latino (any race)	28	23	44	2.42%	1.77%	2.92%
Total	1,157	1,297	1,505	100.00%	100.00%	100.00%

=== 2020 census ===
As of the 2020 census, Redfield had a population of 1,505. There were 626 households, including 428 family households, in the city.

The median age was 39.0 years. About 23.7% of residents were under age 18, and 15.0% were age 65 or older. For every 100 females there were 86.5 males, and for every 100 females age 18 and over there were 85.3 males age 18 and over.

Of the 626 households, 34.2% had children under age 18 living in them. Of all households, 47.9% were married-couple households, 16.9% had a male householder with no spouse or partner present, and 31.2% had a female householder with no spouse or partner present. About 27.3% of all households were made up of individuals, and 9.4% had someone living alone who was age 65 or older.

There were 673 housing units, of which 7.0% were vacant. The homeowner vacancy rate was 1.2%, and the rental vacancy rate was 6.3%.

0.0% of residents lived in urban areas, while 100.0% lived in rural areas.

=== 2010 census ===
As of the census of 2010, there were 1,297 people, 525 households and 369 families residing in the city. There were 581 housing units. The racial makeup of the city was 91.7% White, 4.8% Black or African American, 0.1% Native American, 0.5% Asian, 0% Pacific Islander, 0.6% from other races and 2.3% from two or more races. 1.8% of the population were Hispanic or Latino of any race. There were 525 households, out of which 29.9% had children under the age of 18 living with them, 52.2% were married couples living together, 13.3% had a female householder with no husband present, and 29.7% were non-families. 26.1% of all households were made up of individuals, and 22.9% had someone living alone who was 65 years of age or older. The average household size was 2.47 and the average family size was 2.95. The median age was 38.5 years.

== Arts and culture ==
The Pine Bluff and Jefferson County Library System operates the public library, an about 5,500-square-foot (510 m^{2}) library building, which opened in 1999.

== Government ==
The Redfield City Council comprises the mayor of Redfield and six aldermen. The council determines the strategic direction and policies for the municipality and the Mayor in turn appoints staff to implement those policies and administer and manage the municipal services. Private citizens are welcome to attend the council meetings which are held in the Council Chamber of the City Hall at 212 North Brodie Street, Redfield, on the first Tuesday of the month at 7:00 p.m.

== Education ==
Public education in northwest Jefferson county is administered by the White Hall School District. The school district manages two secondary schools (White Hall High School and White Hall Middle School) and four elementary schools. The M. A. Hardin Elementary School is located in Redfield.

== Infrastructure ==
Redfield is on Highway 365 linking Pine Bluff and Little Rock, as well as Highway 46, linking it to Sheridan. It is also on Interstate 530 (via Highway 46).

== See also ==
- CenturyTel of Redfield
- List of places in the United States named after people
- National Register of Historic Places listings in Jefferson County, Arkansas
