= Pine Bluff Chemical Activity =

U.S. Army chemical weapons disposal facility in Pine Bluff, Arkansas

Pine Bluff Chemical Activity (abbreviated PBCA) is a subordinate organization of the United States Army Chemical Materials Agency located at Pine Bluff Arsenal in Pine Bluff, Arkansas. The U.S. Army stored approximately twelve percent of its original chemical weapons at the Pine Bluff Arsenal since 1942. Destruction of the last chemical weapons occurred on November 12, 2010.

== Manufacture and storage ==
Pine Bluff Arsenal stored 90,409 M55 GB rockets, 19,608 M55 VX rockets, 9,378 M23 VX landmines and 3,705 mustard ton containers. It was also the home for the Binary Chemical Weapons Facility. The facility created one of the two toxic agents that would combine to form sarin. Construction of the diphenylcyanoarsine (DC) facility began in the mid-1980s and a classified number of canisters were produced. A facility was also planned to produce DC, but it was never constructed.

A facility was planned to produce QL (diisopropyl aminoethylmethyl phosphonite), a precursor to the nerve agent VX. Construction began in the late 1980s, but it was mothballed prior to completion in the early 1990s as part of the chemical weapons treaties. Only partial construction of the Bigeye Bomb (BLU-80) fill and close facility at the Pine Bluff Integrated Production Facilities (IBPF) was completed and no filling of the air-delivered binary bomb ever took place. The Army only produced a few of these bombs. They remained empty or filled with a safe, simulated chemical for test purposes. International treaty inspectors witnessed the destruction of all these bombs in the summer of 1999.

== Decommissioning ==
The Pine Bluff Chemical Agent Disposal Facility was completed in 2002, and the Army began weapons disposal in March 2005. By May 2007, the facility had destroyed all of its GB (sarin)-containing rockets and began processing VX-containing munitions. In February 2008 they processed their last VX-containing rocket and in May 2008 began processing VX landmines. Landmine processing was completed in June 2008 and the facility changed over to processing ton containers of mustard gas, the last remaining chemical weapons on site. Workers began destruction of mustard agent-filled ton containers in December 2008. The facility reached 100% destruction of its total chemical stockpile of 3,850 metric tons on November 12, 2010. The facility and Pine Bluff Chemical Activity finalized closure in January 2014.
