= National Center for Toxicological Research =

U.S. government agency

- Logo of the U.S. Food & Drug Administration

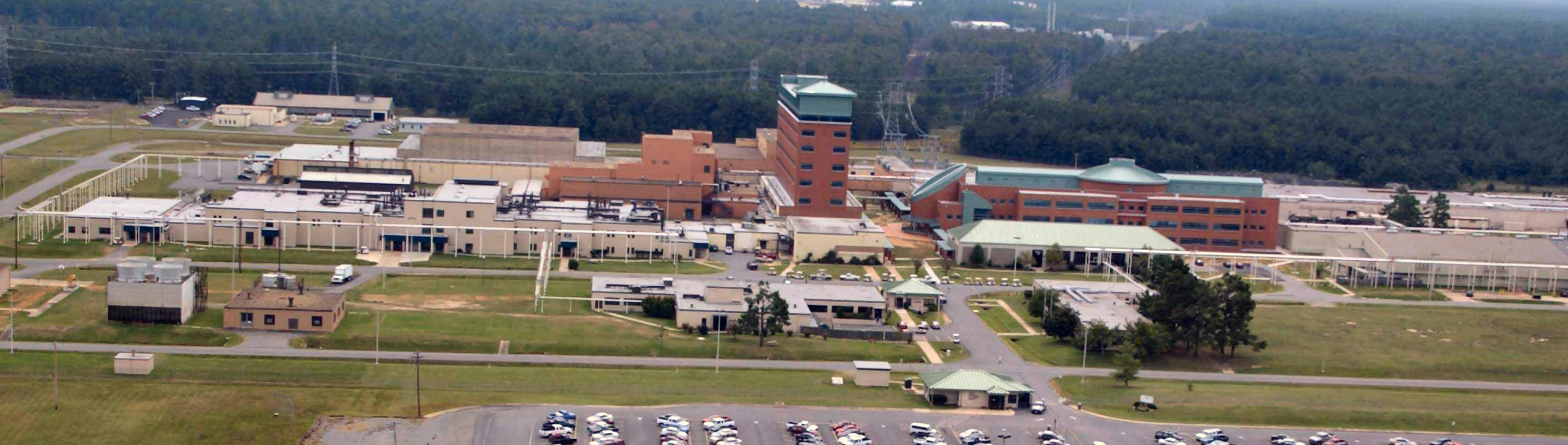
- National Center for Toxicological Research, 2011

Center overview
- Formed: January 27, 1971
- Jurisdiction: Federal government of the United States
- Headquarters: 3900 NCTR Road, Jefferson, Arkansas; 34°21′59.78″N 92°6′43.33″W
- Employees: 509 (August 2019)
- Center executive: Dr. Tucker A. Patterson, Director
- Website: National Center for Toxicological Research

The National Center for Toxicological Research (NCTR) is a branch of the U.S. Food & Drug Administration (FDA) located in Jefferson, Arkansas. Established in 1971, the Center conducts scientific research to provide reliable data for Food & Drug Administration decision-making and develops innovative tools and approaches that support its public health mission.

== History ==
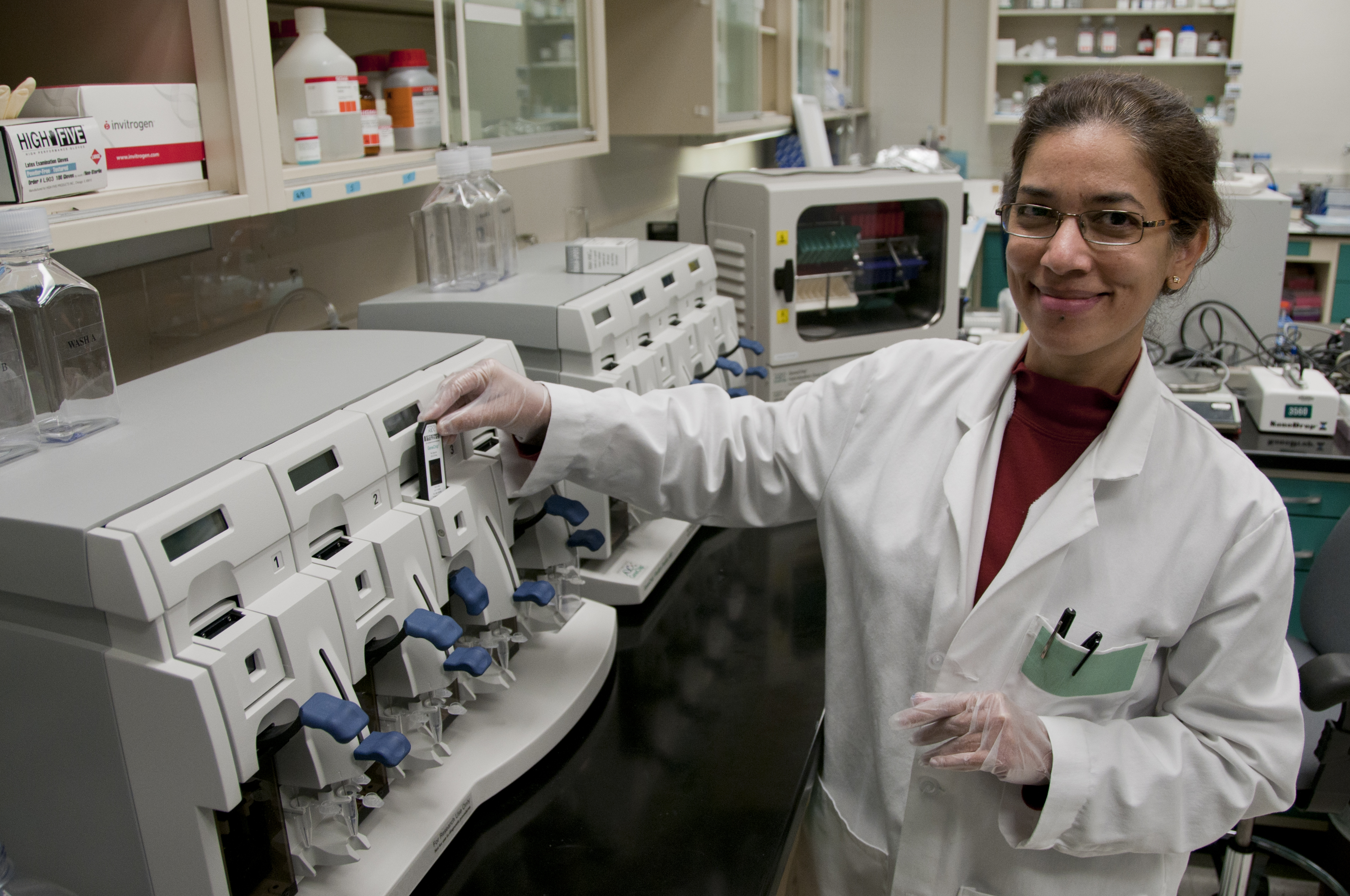
An NCTR scientist processing a microarray to measure and assess the gene levels found in a tissue sample

The National Center for Toxicological Research is geographically adjacent to the Pine Bluff Arsenal, and was once an integrated part of the installation. It was established by executive order on January 27, 1971. The U.S. Army Chemical Corps used the facility for biological warfare research and chemical weapons development until 1969, when President Richard Nixon signed an executive order banning such research from military facilities, and the Army subsequently transferred operation of the site to the FDA.

== Headquarters ==
The Center is located off Interstate 530 at Jefferson, Arkansas. It is the only FDA center located outside the Washington, D.C. metropolitan area, and its campus takes up approximately 1 million square feet.
