= Jefferson, Jefferson County, Arkansas =

Unincorporated community in Arkansas, United States

Jefferson, Arkansas
- Unincorporated community
- Location within Arkansas
- Coordinates: 34°22′50″N 92°09′51″W
- Country: United States
- State: Arkansas
- County: Jefferson
- Township: Jefferson
- Founded: October 3, 1881 (144 years ago)
- Elevation: 341 ft (104 m)
- Time zone: UTC−06:00 (CST)
  - Summer (DST): UTC−05:00 (CDT)
- ZIP code (s): 72079
- Area code (s): 501
- FIPS code: 05-34960
- GNIS feature ID: 77370
- Highways: Highway 365
- Major airport: Clinton National (LIT)

Jefferson, also known as Jefferson Springs, is an unincorporated community in Jefferson County, Arkansas, United States. It is located on Arkansas Highway 365, 4.8 miles (7.7 km) south-southeast of Redfield and is the home of the National Center for Toxicological Research (NCTR).

== History ==
Jefferson was founded on October 3, 1881, the result of the newly built Chicot to Little Rock railroad.

== Economy ==
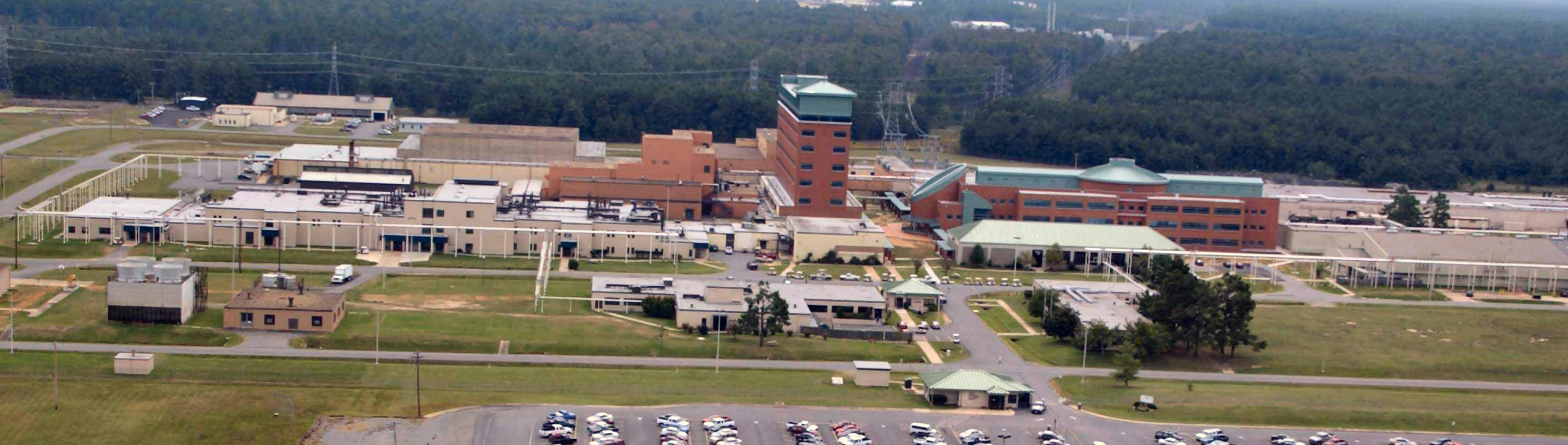
The National Center for Toxicological Research at Jefferson in August 2011

Jefferson is home to the National Center for Toxicological Research and is co-located with the Office of Regulatory Affairs’ Arkansas Regional Laboratory. The Jefferson Laboratories campus sits on 496 acres (201 ha) in the midst of a beautiful pine forest. NCTR is the only Food & Drug Administration (FDA) Center located outside the Washington D.C. metropolitan area. The 1,000,000 square foot (93,000 m^{2}) research campus plays a critical role in the missions of FDA and the U.S. Department of Health & Human Services to promote and protect public health.

== Education ==
Jefferson is served by the White Hall School District.

== Notable residents ==
- W. B. Jacko, politician
