= Coleman High School (Arkansas) =

Location
- Pine Bluff, Arkansas; U.S. 34.2157°N 92.0531°W

Information
- Former name: Hall School; Jefferson County Training School; Jefferson County High School
- Type: Public
- School district: Watson Chapel School District
- Nickname: Pirates

Coleman High School was a public secondary school in Pine Bluff, Arkansas established in 1915. It served as a high school for black students until the public schools were integrated in 1971. It was a part of the Watson Chapel School District.

== History ==
The school was founded as Hall School because it was founded in an abandoned dance hall on West Seventh Street in Pine Bluff. In 1915, C.P. Coleman, a graduate of the all-black Rust College in Holly Springs, Mississippi took the position of principal as well as the entire faculty, with a student body of 50. In 1950, the school had a faculty of 23, a student body of 900, and had moved to West 13th street. The campus included a $30,000 high school building as well as an elementary building and a home economics center. The school gymnasium was at that time the only gym for Negro children in the county. In 1951, a fireproof high school building and a science lab were added on an adjacent tract of land.

On April 15, 1970 there was a shooting resulting in five injuries and one death.

District Court for Eastern District of Arkansas judge Oren Harris, in 1971, ordered the Watson Chapel School Board to desegregate schools. The former Coleman High School/Coleman Elementary School was to become a combined middle school while all high school students were to be moved to Watson Chapel High School.

As of 2016, Coleman Elementary occupies the campus. Earnest C. Smith, a guidance scientist who developed NASA's lunar rover, at one time taught mathematics at Coleman.
