= Parkview Apartments =

Parkview Apartments may refer to:

in the United States

- Parkview Apartments (Pine Bluff, Arkansas), listed on the NRHP
- Parkview Apartments (Cleveland), Ohio
- Parkview Apartments (Portland, Oregon), listed on the NRHP in Oregon
