= George W. Prigmore =

American politician

George W. Prigmore was a state legislator and government official in Arkansas. He served in the Eighteenth Arkansas Legislature in 1871. He married Anna Elliott.

== See also ==
- Prigmore House
