= Mills House (Pine Bluff, Arkansas) =

Historic house in Arkansas, United States

- U.S. National Register of Historic Places
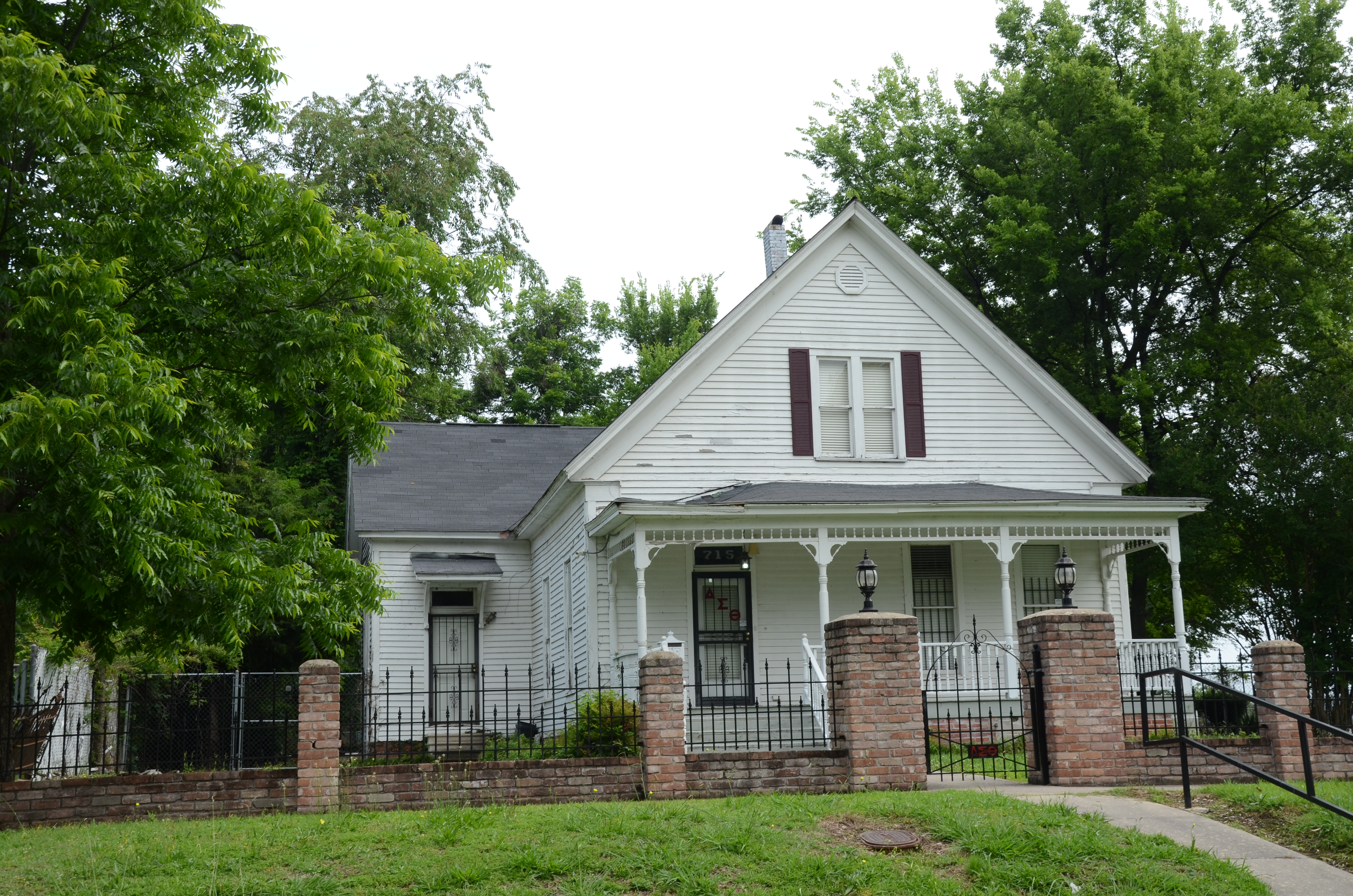

- Location within Arkansas Location within the United States
- Location: 715 W. Barraque, Pine Bluff, Arkansas
- Coordinates: 34°13′15″N 92°0′36″W
- Area: less than one acre
- Built: 1902
- Architectural style: Folk Victorian
- NRHP reference No.: 98000584
- Added to NRHP: May 29, 1998

The Mills House is a historic house at 715 West Barraque Street in Pine Bluff, Arkansas. It is a 1 1/2-story wood-frame structure, three bays wide, with a front gable roof, weatherboard siding, and a brick foundation. Its front has a porch extending across the front, which has turned posts, a spindlework balustrade and frieze, and jigsawn brackets. Built in 1902, it is a good local example of vernacular architecture with Folk Victorian details.

The house was listed on the National Register of Historic Places in 1998.

== See also ==
- National Register of Historic Places listings in Jefferson County, Arkansas
