= John Brown Watson Memorial Library Building =

- U.S. National Register of Historic Places
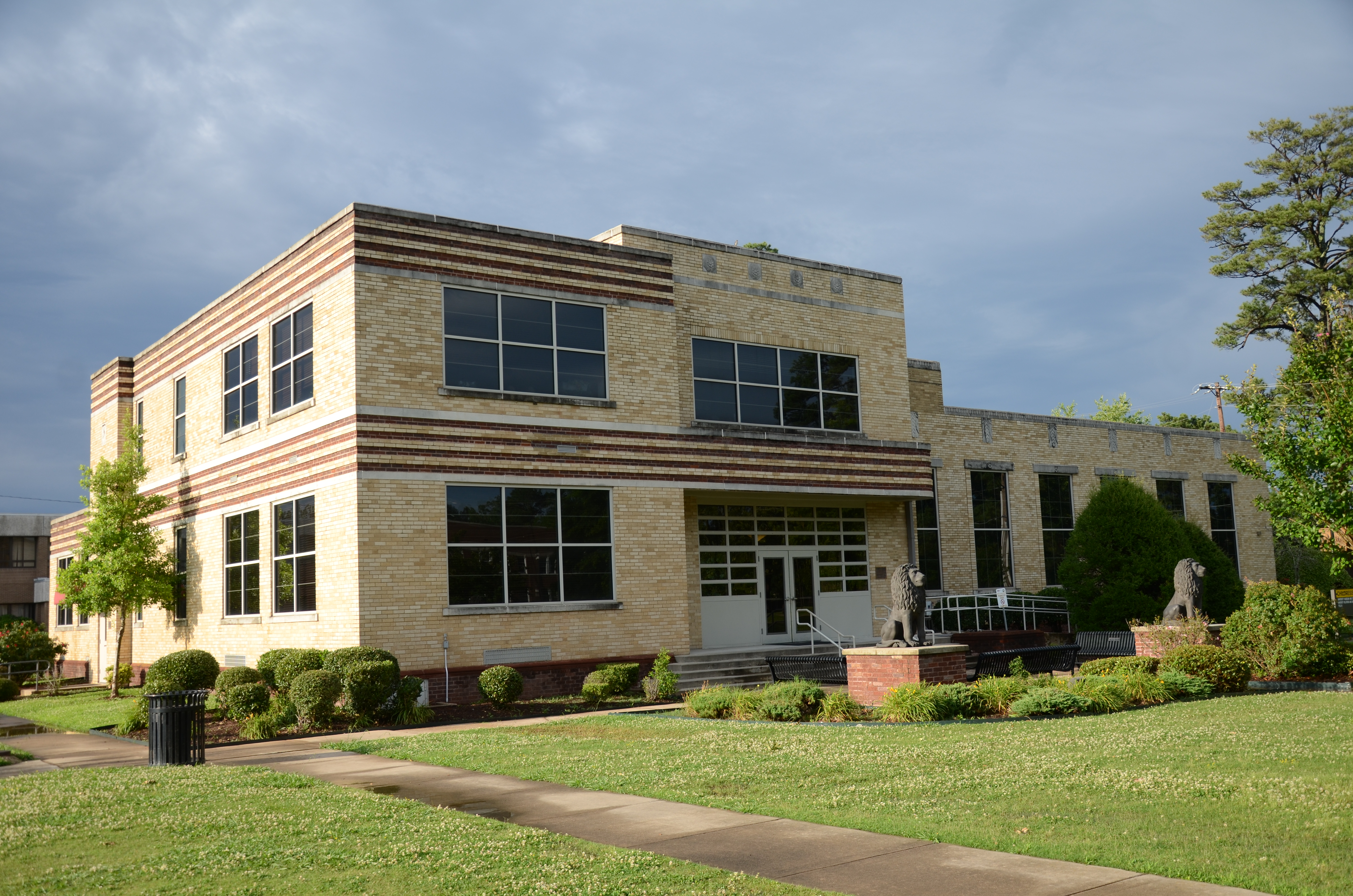

- Location within Arkansas Location within the United States
- Location: 1200 N. University Dr., Pine Bluff, Arkansas
- Coordinates: 34°14′42″N 92°1′13″W
- Area: less than one acre
- Built by: Rock City Construction Co.
- Architect: McAnich and Anderson
- Architectural style: Art Deco
- NRHP reference No.: 05001073
- Added to NRHP: January 13, 2006

The John Brown Watson Memorial Library Building is a historic library building on the campus of the University of Arkansas at Pine Bluff in Pine Bluff, Arkansas. It is a two-story Art Deco building, faced in cream colored brick. It was built in 1938–39 with funding support from the Public Works Administration, and was the first library building on the campus. It underwent a major restoration in 2000–2003, and now serves as the university museum.

== See also ==
- National Register of Historic Places listings in Jefferson County, Arkansas
