= United States Army Snow Plow No. SN-87 =

United States Army Snow Plow #SN-87
- Manufacturer: O.F. Jordan
- Constructed: 1953
- United States Army Snow Plow #SN-87
- U.S. National Register of Historic Places
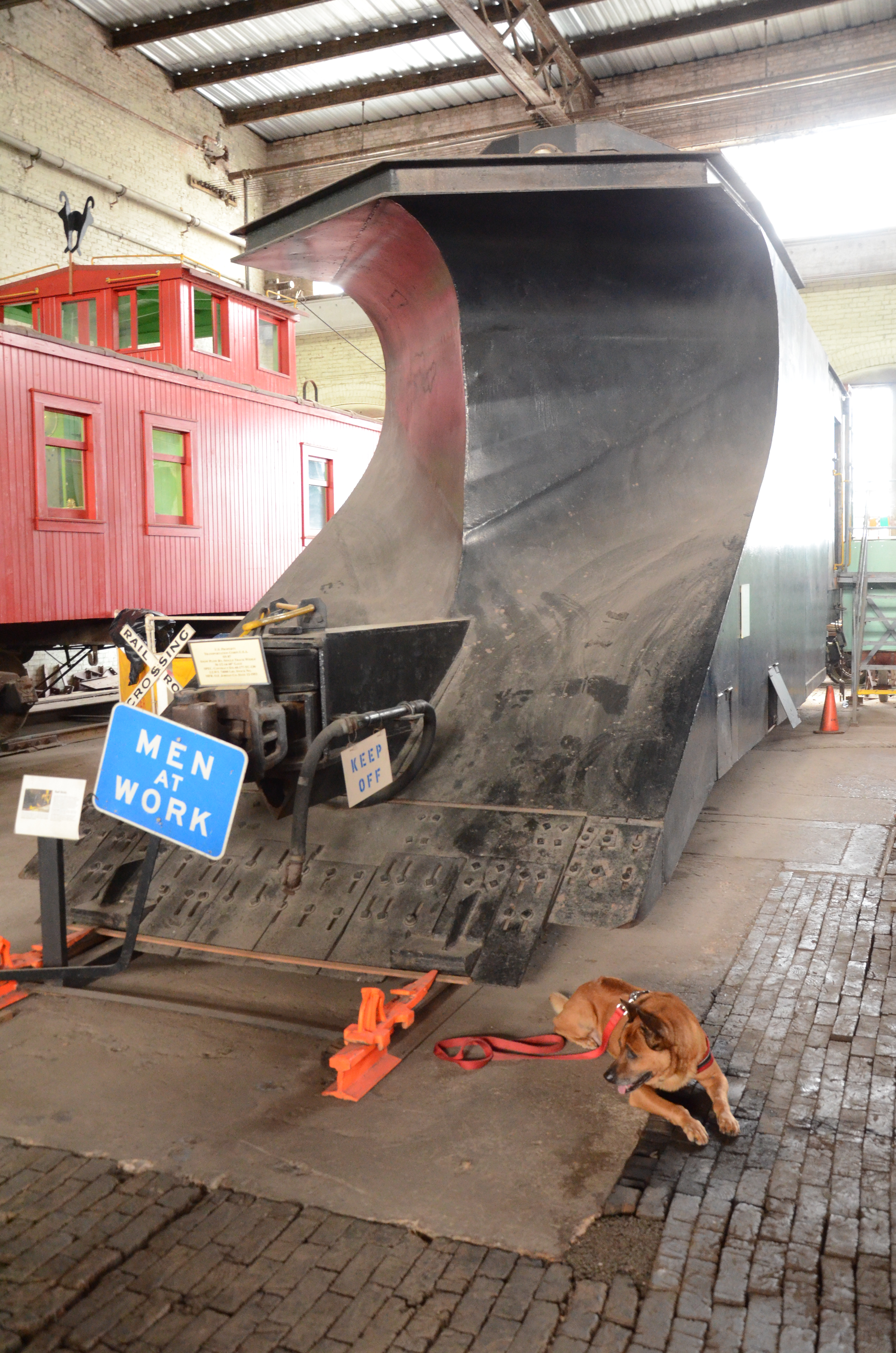
- Front end of the snow plow (dog added for scale)

- Location within Arkansas Location within the United States
- Location: 1700 Port Rd., Arkansas Railroad Museum, Pine Bluff, Arkansas
- Coordinates: 34°13′47″N 91°59′7″W
- Built: 1953
- NRHP reference No.: 06001273
- Added to NRHP: January 24, 2007

The United States Army Snow Plow No. SN-87 is a historic railroad snow plow, that is part of the collection of the Arkansas Railroad Museum in Pine Bluff, Arkansas. It is a 74,000-lb. wedge plow, mounted on a pair of trucks, built in 1953 by the O.F. Jordan Company of East Chicago, Indiana, under contract to the United States Army. It was used by the Army until 1990, when it was donated to the museum.

The plow was listed on the National Register of Historic Places in 2007.

== See also ==
- National Register of Historic Places listings in Jefferson County, Arkansas
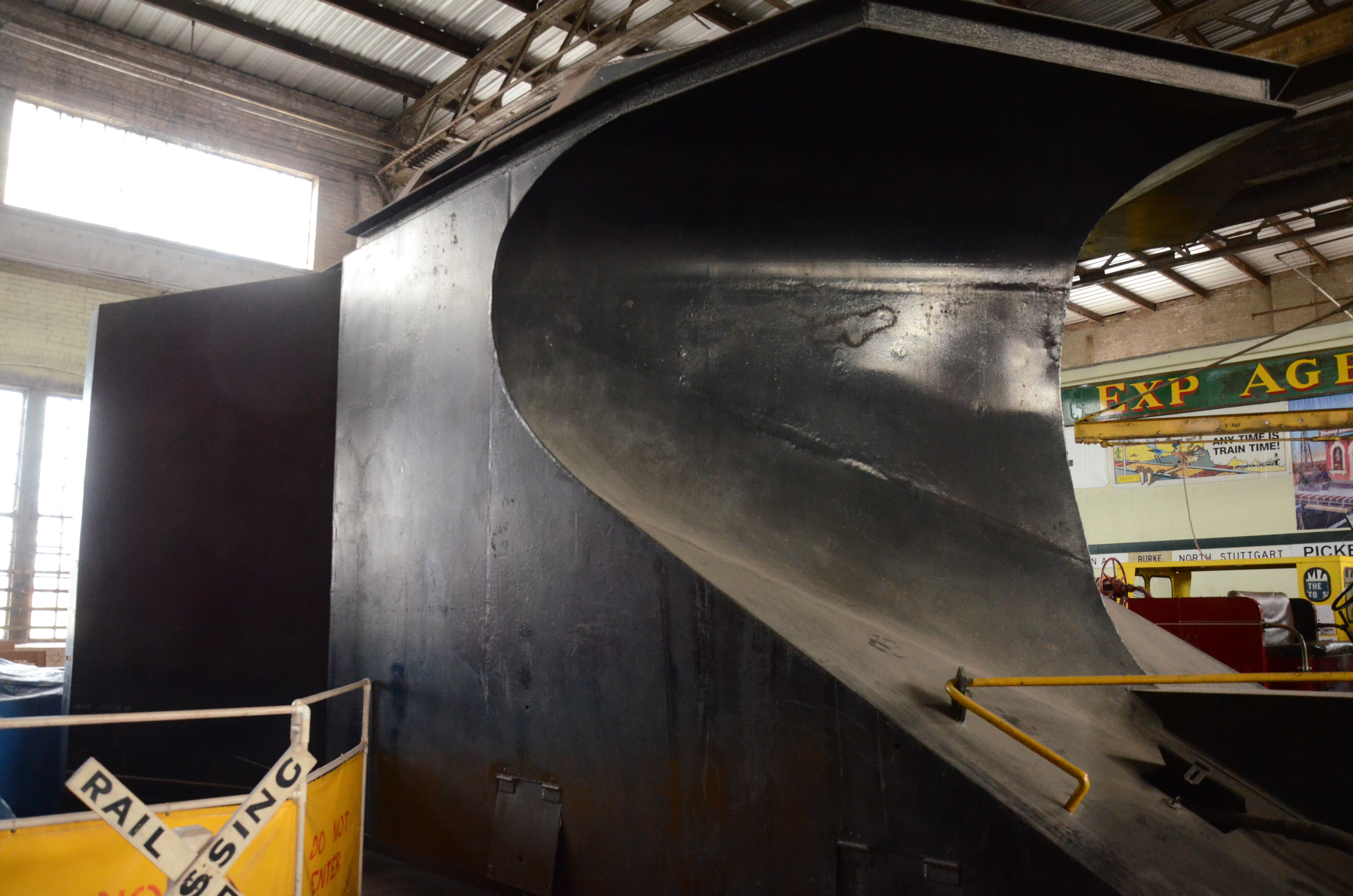
The Snow Plow with extended side wing 2016

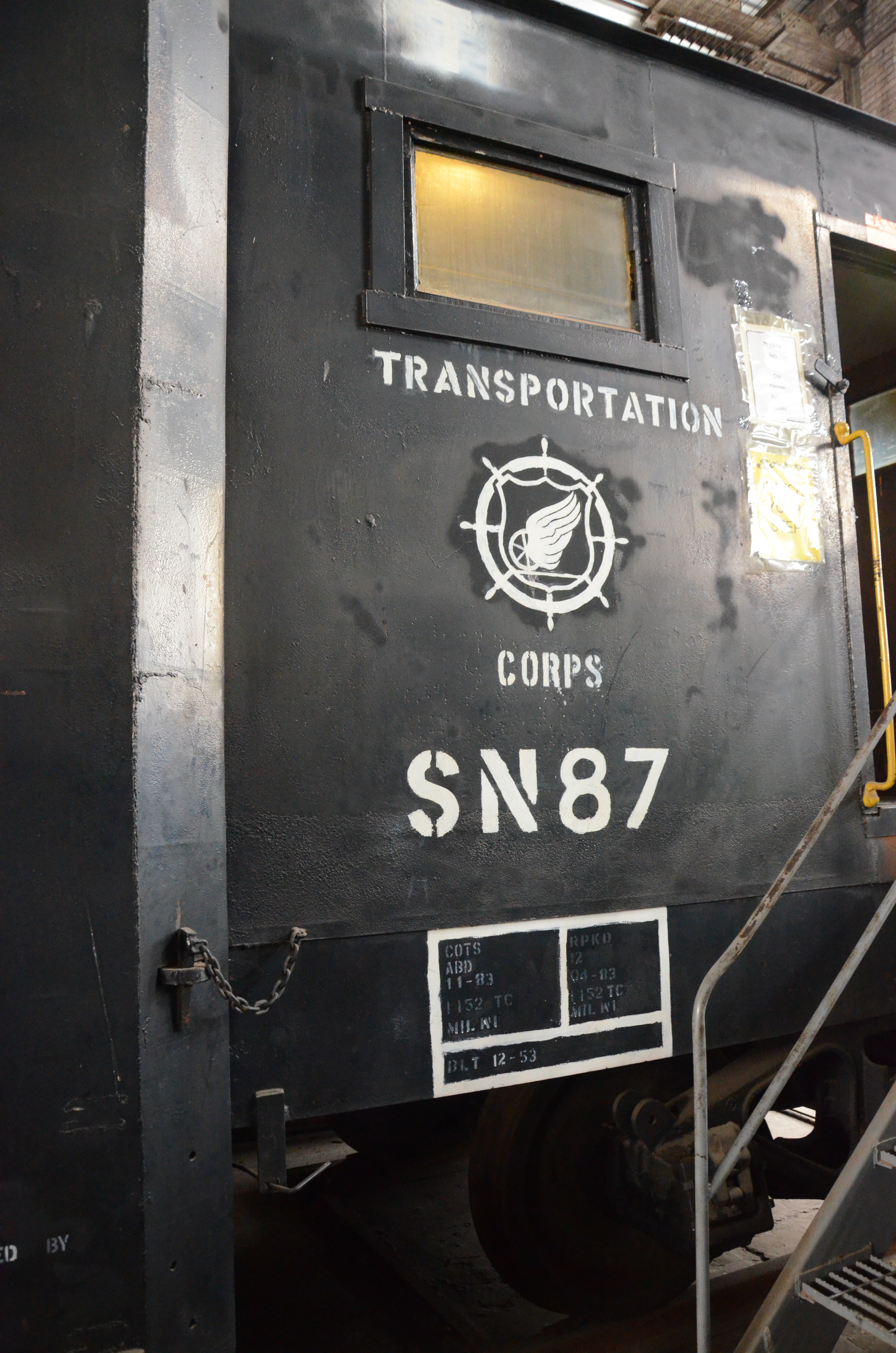
SN-87 Cabin Markings 2016

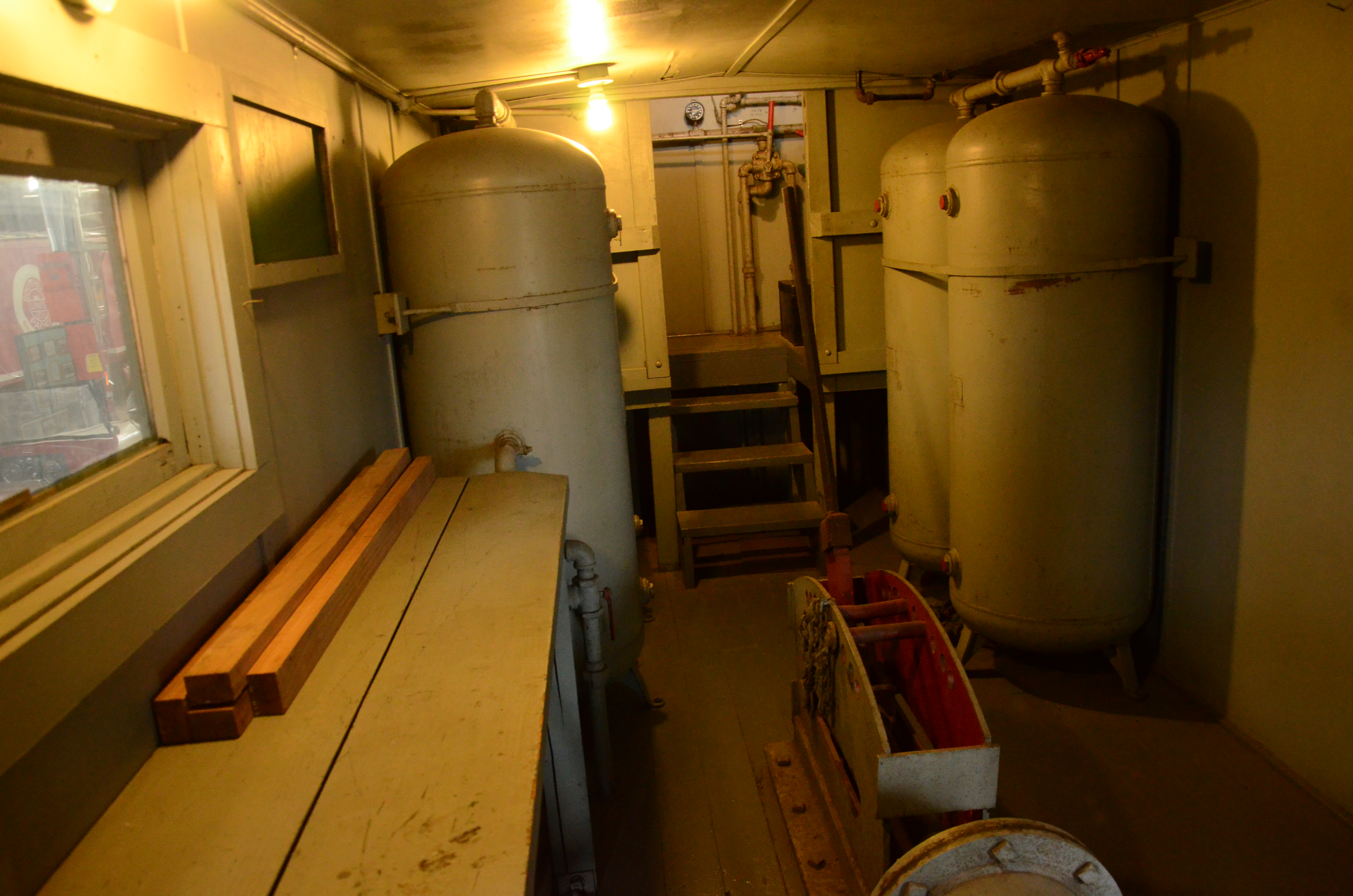
SN-87 Interior 2016
