= MacMillan-Dilley House =

Historic house in Arkansas, United States

- U.S. National Register of Historic Places
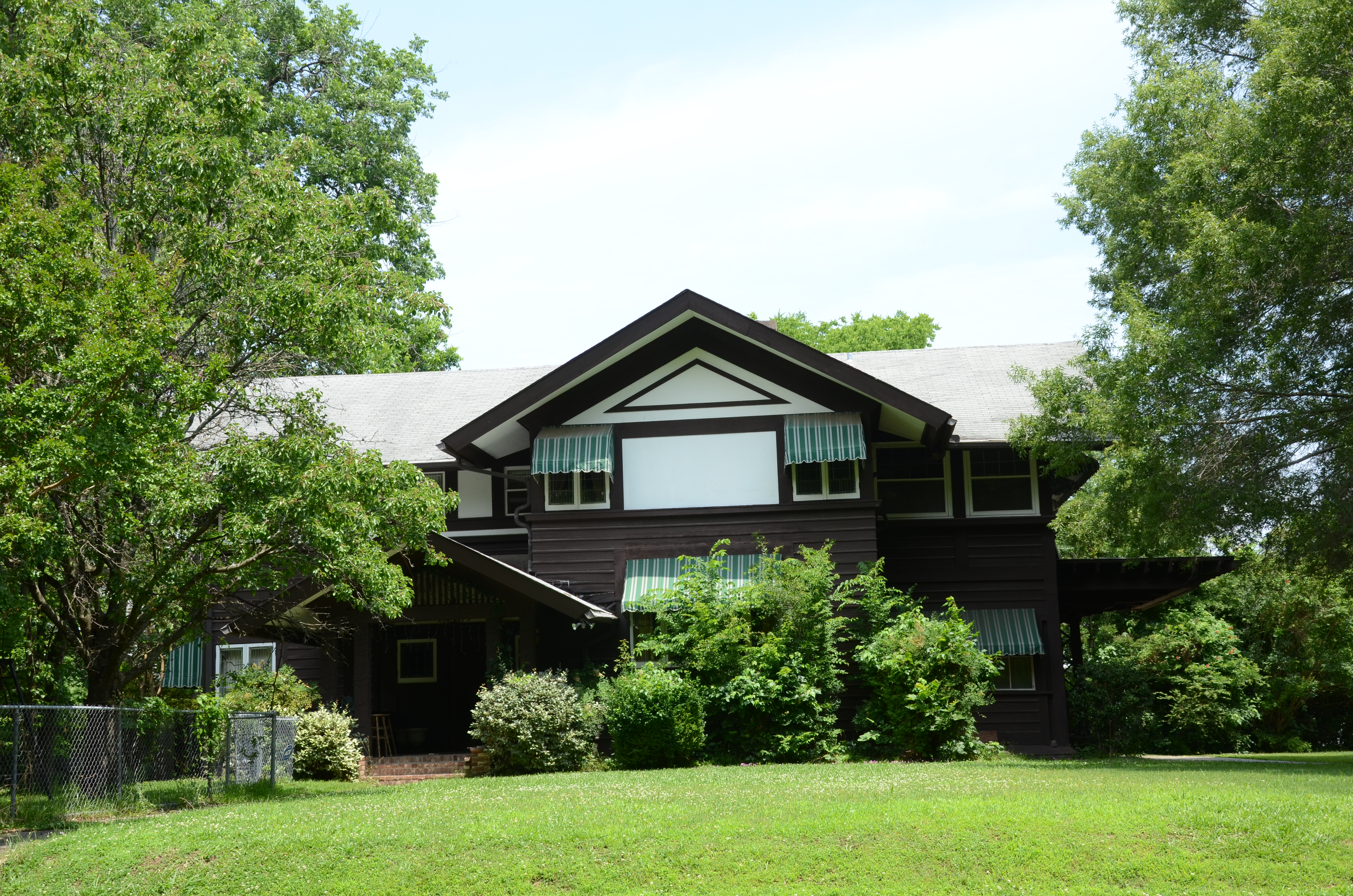

- Location within Arkansas Location within the United States
- Location: 407 Martin Ave., Pine Bluff, Arkansas
- Coordinates: 34°13′5″N 92°0′22″W
- Area: less than one acre
- Built: 1903
- Built by: J.W. Dutton
- Architect: Hugh M.G. Garden
- Architectural style: Prairie School
- NRHP reference No.: 76000422
- Added to NRHP: December 12, 1976

The MacMillan-Dilley House is a historic house at 407 Martin Avenue in Pine Bluff, Arkansas. It is a two-story wood-frame structure, with a cross-gable roof configuration, and distinctive siding consisting of boards topped by moulding. The underside of the extended roof gables are painted white, and the building has other features that are signatures of the Prairie School of design. It was built in 1903 to a design by Chicago architect Hugh M.G. Garden, who had supposedly studied with the major exponent of the Prairie School style, Frank Lloyd Wright.

The house was listed on the National Register of Historic Places in 1976.

== See also ==
- National Register of Historic Places listings in Jefferson County, Arkansas
