= Yauch-Ragar House =

Historic house in Arkansas, United States

- U.S. National Register of Historic Places
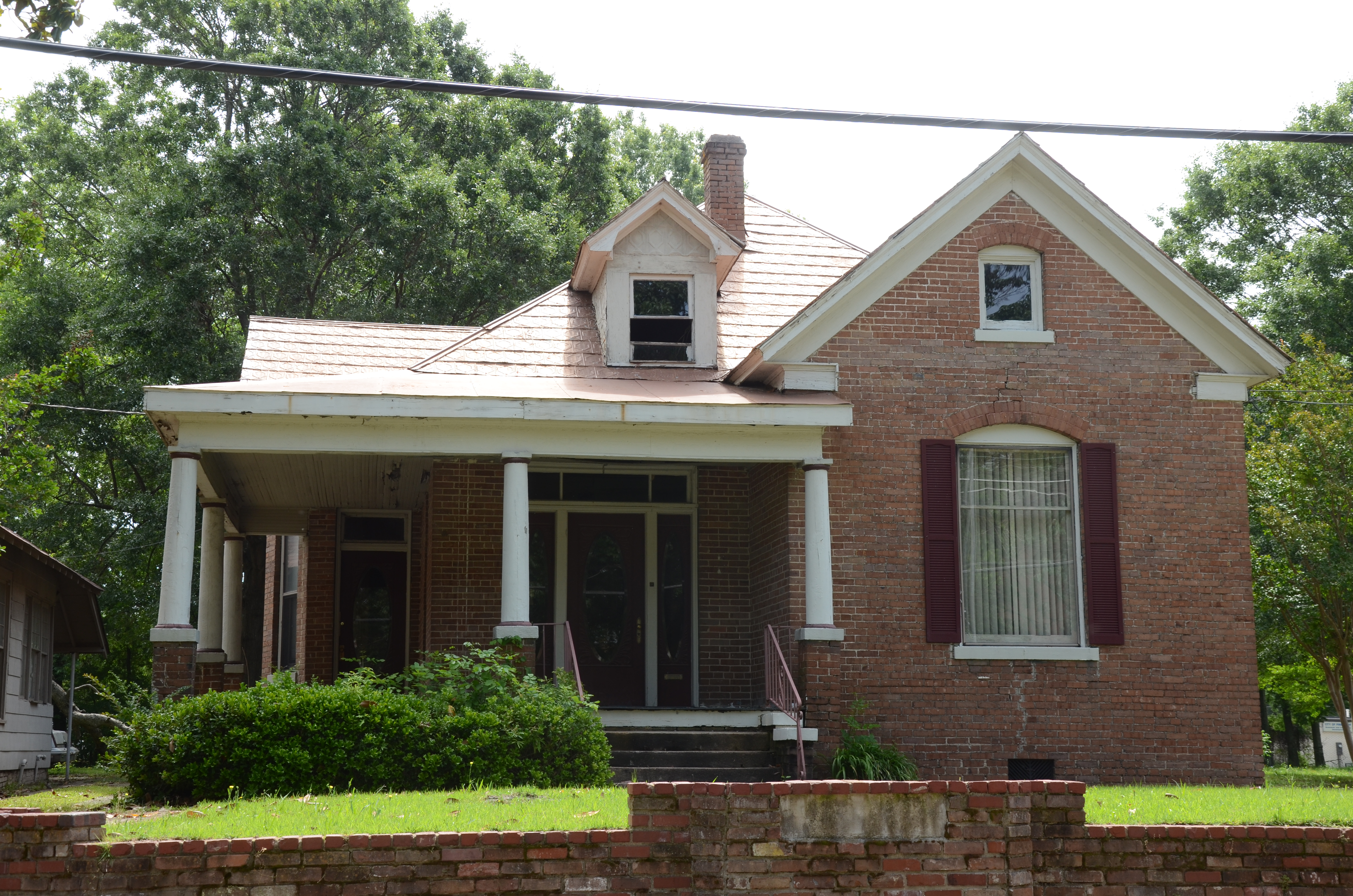

- Location within Arkansas Location within the United States
- Location: 625 State St., Pine Bluff, Arkansas
- Coordinates: 34°13′28″N 92°0′7″W
- Area: less than one acre
- Built: 1907
- NRHP reference No.: 78000602
- Added to NRHP: January 20, 1978

The Yauch-Ragar House is a historic house at 625 State Street in Pine Bluff, Arkansas. It is a single-story brick structure, with a hip roof. A gable projects from the front, with a large segmented-arch window at the center, and a smaller similar window in the gable. To the projecting section's left, a porch is supported by Tuscan columns. Built in 1907, the house is a rare example of brick construction from that period. It was built by William Yauch, who with his brother owned a local brickworks.

The house was listed on the National Register of Historic Places in 1978.

== See also ==
- national Register of Historic Places listings in Jefferson County, Arkansas
