= Walter B. Sorrells Cottage =

- U.S. National Register of Historic Places
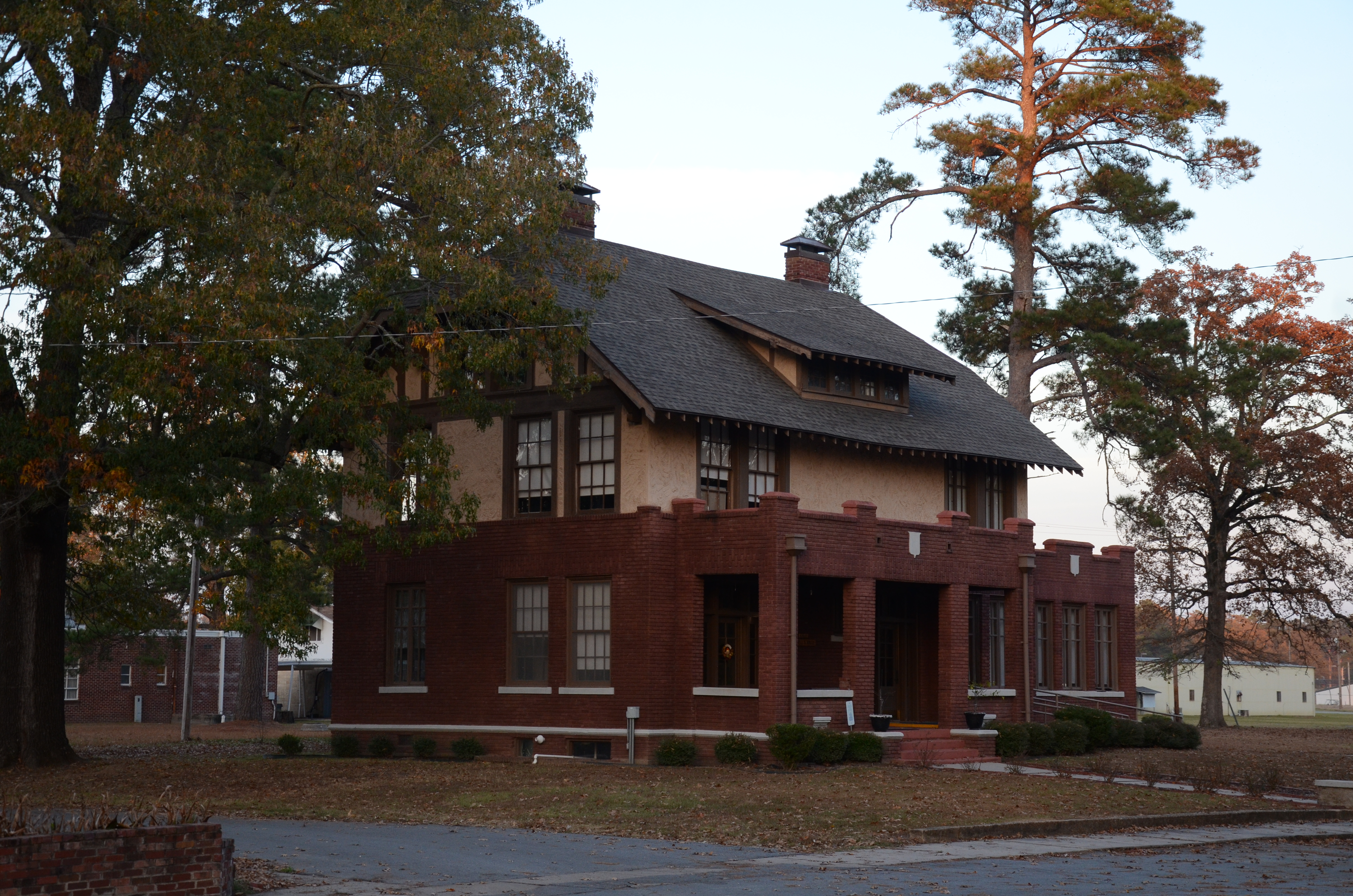

- Location within Arkansas Location within the United States
- Location: Southeastern Arkansas Community Correction Center, Pine Bluff, Arkansas
- Coordinates: 34°13′3″N 92°5′16″W
- Area: less than one acre
- Built: 1920
- Architect: Mitchell Seligman, E.C. Royce
- Architectural style: Late 19th And 20th Century Revivals, Bungalow/craftsman, English Revival
- NRHP reference No.: 86002276
- Added to NRHP: August 4, 1986

The Walter B. Sorrells Cottage is a historic administrative (and formerly residential) building on the campus of the Southeastern Arkansas Community Correction Center in Pine Bluff, Arkansas, United States. It is a two-story frame building, finished in brick on the first floor and stucco and half-timbering on the second, with Craftsman-style eaves adorned with exposed rafter ends and brackets. Built in 1920 to a design by Pine Bluff architect Mitchell Seligman, it was the first permanent structure of what was then known as the Boys Industrial School, a state facility for troubled youth.

The building was listed on the National Register of Historic Places in 1986.

== See also ==
- National Register of Historic Places listings in Jefferson County, Arkansas
