= R.E. Lee House =

Historic house in Arkansas, United States

- R. E. Lee House
- U.S. National Register of Historic Places
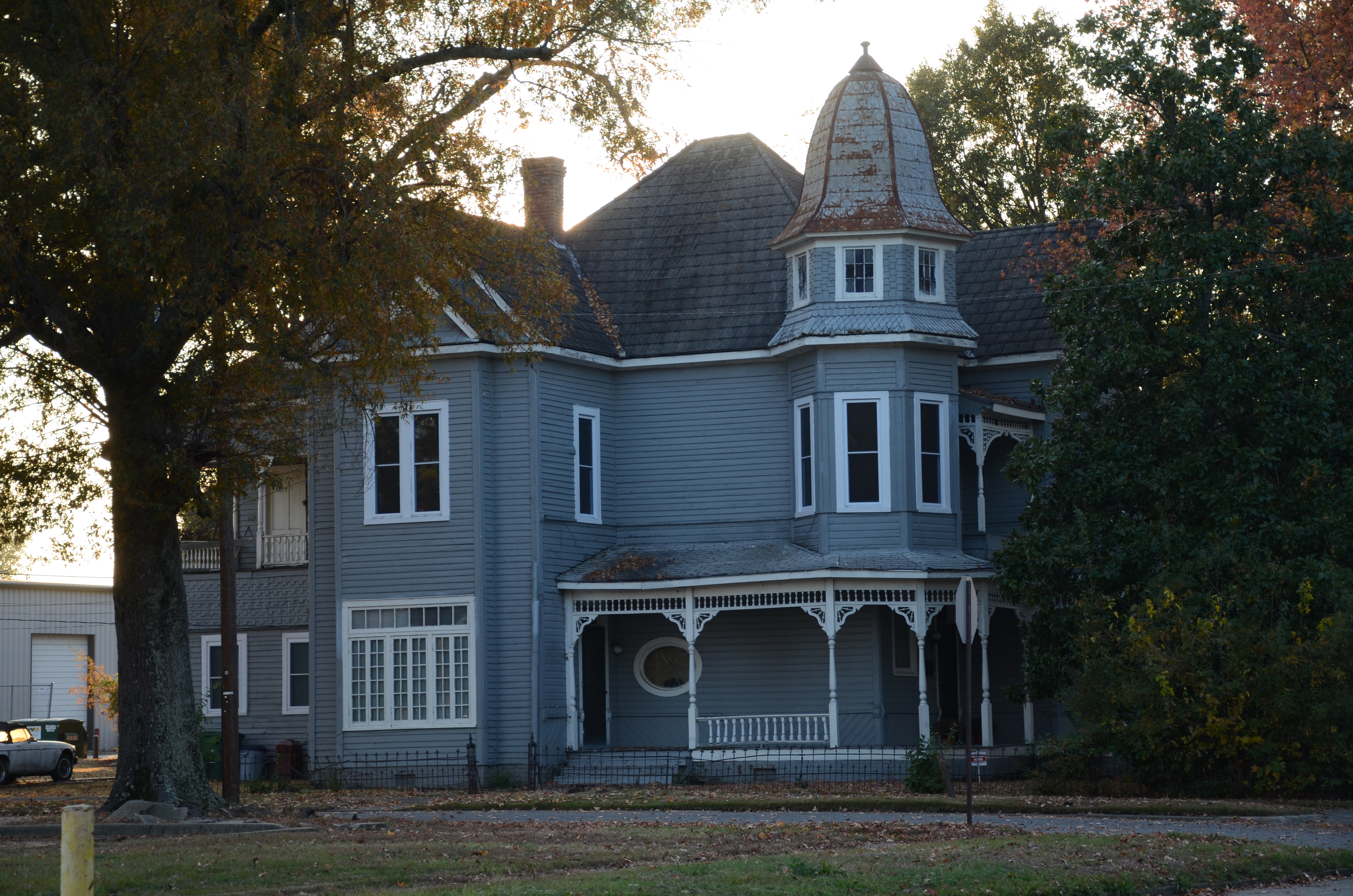

- Location within Arkansas Location within the United States
- Location: 1302 W. 2nd Ave., Pine Bluff, Arkansas
- Coordinates: 34°13′41″N 92°0′59″W
- Area: less than one acre
- Built: 1893
- Architectural style: Queen Anne, Eastlake
- NRHP reference No.: 82002118
- Added to NRHP: June 8, 1982

The R.E. Lee House is a historic house at 1302 West 2nd Street in Pine Bluff, Arkansas. It is a 1 1/2-story wood-frame structure, with asymmetrical massing and complex roof line characteristic of the Queen Anne period of architecture. The house is set on a lot with an original period wrought iron fence. A three-story corner tower with bellcast six-side roof projects from one corner, with an elaborately decorated Eastlake-style porch sheltering its entrance. Built in 1893, it is an outstanding local example of the Queen Anne style.

The house was listed on the National Register of Historic Places in 1982.

== See also ==
- National Register of Historic Places listings in Jefferson County, Arkansas
