= National Register of Historic Places listings in Jefferson County, Arkansas =

Location of Jefferson County in Arkansas

This is a list of the National Register of Historic Places listings in Jefferson County, Arkansas.

This is intended to be a complete list of the properties and districts on the National Register of Historic Places in Jefferson County, Arkansas, United States. The locations of National Register properties and districts for which the latitude and longitude coordinates are included below, may be seen in a map.

There are 75 properties and districts listed on the National Register in the county. Another 10 properties were once listed but have been removed.

Contents: Counties in Arkansas
- Arkansas
- Ashley
- Baxter
- Benton
- Boone
- Bradley
- Calhoun
- Carroll
- Chicot
- Clark
- Clay
- Cleburne
- Cleveland
- Columbia
- Conway
- Craighead
- Crawford
- Crittenden
- Cross
- Dallas
- Desha
- Drew
- Faulkner
- Franklin
- Fulton
- Garland
- Grant
- Greene
- Hempstead
- Hot Spring
- Howard
- Independence
- Izard
- Jackson
- Jefferson
- Johnson
- Lafayette
- Lawrence
- Lee
- Lincoln
- Little River
- Logan
- Lonoke
- Madison
- Marion
- Miller
- Mississippi
- Monroe
- Montgomery
- Nevada
- Newton
- Ouachita
- Perry
- Phillips
- Pike
- Poinsett
- Polk
- Pope
- Prairie
- Pulaski (Little Rock)
- Randolph
- St. Francis
- Saline
- Scott
- Searcy
- Sebastian
- Sevier
- Sharp
- Stone
- Union
- Van Buren
- Washington
- White
- Woodruff
- Yell

This National Park Service list is complete through NPS recent listings posted December 19, 2025.

== Current listings ==
	Name on the Register	Image	Date listed	Location	City or town	Description
1	Antioch Missionary Baptist Church Cemetery	Antioch Missionary Baptist Church Cemetery	July 8, 2010 (#10000437)	500 N. McKinney Rd. 34°23′37″N 91°59′01″W	Sherrill	
2	Arkansas Louisiana Gas Company Building	Arkansas Louisiana Gas Company Building	May 10, 2001 (#01000480)	116 W. 6th 34°13′25″N 92°00′14″W	Pine Bluff	
3	Jewel Bain House Number 2	Jewel Bain House Number 2	January 29, 2013 (#12001228)	3601 S. Cherry St. 34°11′34″N 92°00′47″W	Pine Bluff	
4	Jewel Bain House No. 4		September 21, 2017 (#100001649)	27 Longmeadow; 34°11′38″N 92°01′14″W	Pine Bluff	
5	Bellingrath House	Bellingrath House	December 1, 1994 (#94001410)	7520 Dollarway Rd. 34°24′09″N 92°10′28″W	White Hall	
6	Boone-Murphy House	Boone-Murphy House	February 18, 1979 (#79000442)	714 W. 4th Ave. 34°13′32″N 92°00′39″W	Pine Bluff	
7	Caldwell Hall	Caldwell Hall	December 22, 1982 (#82000843)	University Drive; 34°14′32″N 92°01′10″W	Pine Bluff	
8	Camp White Sulphur Springs Confederate Cemetery	Camp White Sulphur Springs Confederate Cemetery	January 19, 2005 (#04001512)	Luckwood Rd. one half block north of Highway 54; 34°10′52″N 92°07′11″W	Sulphur Springs	
9	Carnahan House	Carnahan House	September 30, 2014 (#14000790)	1200 S. Laurel St. 34°13′03″N 92°00′30″W	Pine Bluff	
10	Central Texas Gravel Locomotive #210	Central Texas Gravel Locomotive #210	May 24, 2007 (#07000442)	Arkansas Railroad Museum; 34°13′46″N 91°59′06″W	Pine Bluff	
11	Community Theatre	Community Theatre	May 26, 2004 (#04000507)	207 W. 2nd Ave. 34°13′49″N 92°00′17″W	Pine Bluff	
12	DODX Guard Car #G-56	DODX Guard Car #G-56	June 28, 2007 (#07000441)	Arkansas Railroad Museum; 34°13′47″N 91°59′06″W	Pine Bluff	
13	Lawrence A. Davis Sr. Student Union		May 12, 2021 (#100006531)	2000 LA Prexy Davis Dr. 34°14′59″N 92°01′24″W	Pine Bluff	
14	Dollarway Road	Dollarway Road	May 17, 1974 (#74000480)	South of Redfield off U.S. Highway 65; also Highway 365; 34°26′17″N 92°10′49″W	Redfield	Highway 365 represents a boundary increase of July 15, 1999
15	Du Bocage	Du Bocage	June 24, 1974 (#74000478)	1115 W. 4th St. 34°13′34″N 92°00′42″W	Pine Bluff	
16	The Elms		July 7, 1978 (#78000596)	South of Altheimer; 34°18′15″N 91°50′33″W	Altheimer	
17	Federal Building-U.S. Post Office and Courthouse		February 7, 2017 (#100000626)	100 E. 8th St. 34°13′17″N 92°00′11″W	Pine Bluff	
18	Ferguson House	Ferguson House	January 18, 1978 (#78000598)	902 E. 4th Ave. 34°13′33″N 92°00′42″W	Pine Bluff	
19	Fox House	Fox House	December 22, 1982 (#82000845)	1303 S. Olive St. 34°12′58″N 92°00′25″W	Pine Bluff	
20	Gibson-Burnham House	Gibson-Burnham House	June 5, 1991 (#91000694)	1326 Cherry St. 34°12′56″N 92°00′49″W	Pine Bluff	
21	Hotel Pines	Hotel Pines	August 10, 1979 (#79000443)	Main St. and W. 5th Ave. 34°13′30″N 92°00′13″W	Pine Bluff	
22	Howson House	Howson House	December 22, 1982 (#82000847)	1700 S. Olive St. 34°12′41″N 92°00′25″W	Pine Bluff	
23	Hudson House	Hudson House	December 22, 1982 (#82000848)	304 W. 5th St. 34°12′51″N 92°00′20″W	Pine Bluff	
24	Hudson-Grace-Borreson House	Hudson-Grace-Borreson House	June 24, 1971 (#71000126)	716 W. Barraque; 34°13′44″N 92°00′30″W	Pine Bluff	
25	Island of Hope Chapel		April 30, 2024 (#100010308)	2400 State Farm Road; 34°26′12″N 91°54′41″W	Tucker	
26	Johnson House	Johnson House	December 22, 1982 (#82000849)	315 Martin St. 34°13′06″N 92°00′21″W	Pine Bluff	
27	Katzenstein House	Katzenstein House	December 22, 1982 (#82000850)	902 W. 5th St. 34°13′30″N 92°00′46″W	Pine Bluff	
28	R.M. Knox House	R.M. Knox House	June 5, 1975 (#75000395)	1504 W. 6th St. 34°13′24″N 92°01′04″W	Pine Bluff	A two-story frame house exemplifying Eastlake Victorian architecture. Features include a three-story tower, a gabled bay, and a two-story porch along the east end. It was built in 1885 by R. M. Knox, a wealthy Pine Bluff businessman.
29	Lake Dick	Lake Dick	July 3, 1975 (#75000394)	4 miles (6.4 km) south of Altheimer off Highway 88; 34°15′13″N 91°50′30″W	Altheimer	
30	R.E. Lee House	R.E. Lee House	June 8, 1982 (#82002118)	1302 W. 2nd Ave. 34°13′41″N 92°00′59″W	Pine Bluff	
31	Lone Star Baptist Church	Lone Star Baptist Church	September 28, 2005 (#05001076)	620 Sheridan Rd. 34°26′32″N 92°11′17″W	Redfield	
32	MacMillan-Dilley House	MacMillan-Dilley House	December 12, 1976 (#76000422)	407 Martin Ave. 34°13′05″N 92°00′22″W	Pine Bluff	
33	Masonic Temple	Masonic Temple	November 30, 1978 (#78000599)	4th and State St. 34°13′35″N 92°00′09″W	Pine Bluff	
34	McDonald's Store #433 Sign	McDonald's Store #433 Sign	August 21, 2006 (#06000411)	2801 S. Olive St. 34°12′00″N 92°00′24″W	Pine Bluff	
35	Merchants and Planters Bank Building	Merchants and Planters Bank Building	August 1, 1978 (#78000600)	100 Main St. 34°13′45″N 92°00′13″W	Pine Bluff	
36	Mills House	Mills House	May 29, 1998 (#98000584)	715 W. Barraque; 34°13′15″N 92°00′36″W	Pine Bluff	
37	National Guard Armory	National Guard Armory	February 16, 2001 (#01000112)	623 W. 2nd Ave. 34°13′44″N 92°00′32″W	Pine Bluff	
38	Nichol House	Nichol House	November 12, 1993 (#93001201)	205 Park Pl. 34°12′39″N 92°00′02″W	Pine Bluff	
39	W.E. O'Bryant Bell Tower	W.E. O'Bryant Bell Tower	June 3, 1998 (#98000622)	1200 N. University Dr. on the campus of the University of Pine Bluff; 34°14′35″N 92°01′08″W	Pine Bluff	
40	Parkview Apartments	Parkview Apartments	May 1, 1989 (#89000335)	300 W. 13th Ave. 34°12′58″N 92°00′20″W	Pine Bluff	
41	Pine Bluff Arsenal Access Road Bridge No. 2280		January 24, 2019 (#100003330)	AR 256 over Caney Cr. 34°17′45″N 92°05′46″W	White Hall	
42	Pine Bluff Civic Center	Pine Bluff Civic Center	June 1, 2005 (#05000496)	200 E. 8th Ave. 34°13′19″N 92°00′04″W	Pine Bluff	
43	Pine Bluff Commercial Historic District	Pine Bluff Commercial Historic District	May 20, 2008 (#08000438)	Roughly bounded by U.S. Highway 65B, Walnut St., 10th Ave., and S. Alabama St. 34°13′18″N 92°00′11″W	Pine Bluff	
44	Pine Bluff Fifth Avenue Historic District	Pine Bluff Fifth Avenue Historic District	October 29, 1980 (#80000777)	5th Ave. 34°13′30″N 92°00′27″W	Pine Bluff	
45	Plum Bayou Homesteads	Plum Bayou Homesteads	June 5, 1975 (#75000396)	North of Pine Bluff, east of the Arkansas River, includes the community of Wright and its environs 34°25′52″N 92°03′21″W	Pine Bluff	
46	Prigmore House	Prigmore House	April 10, 1986 (#86000720)	1104 W. 5th Ave. 34°13′29″N 92°00′38″W	Pine Bluff	
47	Puddephatt House	Puddephatt House	December 22, 1982 (#82000851)	1820 S. Olive St. 34°12′37″N 92°00′26″W	Pine Bluff	
48	Redfield Commercial Historic District		November 3, 2023 (#100009339)	300 and 301 Sheridan Rd. 34°26′41″N 92°11′04″W	Redfield	
49	Redfield School Historic District	Redfield School Historic District	October 1, 2014 (#14000791)	101 School St. 34°26′54″N 92°11′06″W	Redfield	
50	Roselawn	Roselawn	May 23, 1978 (#78000597)	Southwest of Altheimer off Highway 88; 34°18′26″N 91°51′34″W	Altheimer	
51	Roth-Rosenzweig House	Roth-Rosenzweig House	December 12, 1976 (#76000423)	717 W. 2nd Ave. 34°13′43″N 92°00′34″W	Pine Bluff	
52	Saenger Theater	Saenger Theater	March 23, 1995 (#95000348)	Southeastern corner of the junction of W. 2nd Ave. and Pine St. 34°13′41″N 92°00′14″W	Pine Bluff	
53	St. Louis San Francisco (Frisco) Railway Coach #661		May 19, 2006 (#06000413)	2815 Dixie Woods Dr. 34°16′04″N 92°03′35″W	Pine Bluff	
54	St. Louis Southwestern Railway (Cotton Belt Route) Caboose #2325		March 2, 2006 (#06000074)	2815 Dixie Woods Dr. 34°16′04″N 92°03′34″W	Pine Bluff	
55	St. Louis Southwestern Railway (Cotton Belt Route) Relief Train	St. Louis Southwestern Railway (Cotton Belt Route) Relief Train	May 25, 2007 (#07000471)	Arkansas Railroad Museum; 34°13′45″N 91°59′09″W	Pine Bluff	
56	St. Louis Southwestern Railway (Cotton Belt Route) Steam Locomotive #336	St. Louis Southwestern Railway (Cotton Belt Route) Steam Locomotive #336	January 24, 2007 (#06001276)	Arkansas Railroad Museum; 34°13′37″N 91°59′04″W	Pine Bluff	
57	St. Louis Southwestern Railway Steam Locomotive #819	St. Louis Southwestern Railway Steam Locomotive #819	May 18, 2003 (#03000401)	Arkansas Railroad Museum; 34°13′37″N 91°59′05″W	Pine Bluff	
58	St. Peter's Cemetery	St. Peter's Cemetery	June 4, 1998 (#98000617)	Morgan Rd., south of New Gascony; 34°13′17″N 91°46′42″W	Pine Bluff	
59	Sherrill Methodist Episcopal Church, South	Sherrill Methodist Episcopal Church, South	May 16, 2002 (#02000487)	301 Main St. 34°23′15″N 91°57′08″W	Sherrill	
60	Walter B. Sorrells Cottage	Walter B. Sorrells Cottage	August 4, 1986 (#86002276)	Off Highway 104; 34°13′03″N 92°05′16″W	Pine Bluff	
61	Strengthen the Arm of Liberty Monument-Pine Bluff	Strengthen the Arm of Liberty Monument-Pine Bluff	November 1, 2000 (#00001265)	10th Ave. between Georgia and State Sts. 34°13′11″N 92°00′03″W	Pine Bluff	
62	Taylor Field	Taylor Field	January 21, 2010 (#09001250)	1201 E. 16th St. 34°12′50″N 91°59′29″W	Pine Bluff	
63	Temple House	Temple House	December 22, 1982 (#82000840)	1702 S. Oak St. 34°12′41″N 92°00′38″W	Pine Bluff	
64	Trinity Episcopal Church	Trinity Episcopal Church	July 30, 1974 (#74000479)	3rd and Oak Sts. 34°13′40″N 92°00′36″W	Pine Bluff	
65	Trulock-Cook House	Trulock-Cook House	February 21, 1979 (#79000444)	703 W. 2nd Ave. 34°13′43″N 92°00′38″W	Pine Bluff	
66	Trulock-Gould-Mullis House	Trulock-Gould-Mullis House	January 3, 1978 (#78003199)	704 W. Barraque St. 34°13′46″N 92°00′35″W	Pine Bluff	
67	Tucker School	Tucker School	June 10, 2005 (#05000538)	Vandalsen Dr. 34°26′08″N 91°57′21″W	Tucker	
68	Union Station	Union Station	December 14, 1978 (#78000601)	E. 4th Ave. and State St. 34°13′34″N 92°00′06″W	Pine Bluff	
69	U.S. 65 Expressway Pedestrian Bridge		May 13, 2021 (#100006530)	Spanning the Martha Mitchell Expwy. at Mulberry St. 34°13′45″N 92°00′57″W	Pine Bluff	
70	United States Army Snow Plow #SN-87	United States Army Snow Plow #SN-87	January 24, 2007 (#06001273)	Arkansas Railroad Museum; 34°13′47″N 91°59′07″W	Pine Bluff	
71	Wabash Alloys Locomotive	Wabash Alloys Locomotive	May 22, 2007 (#07000444)	Arkansas Railroad Museum; 34°13′45″N 91°59′06″W	Pine Bluff	
72	Wabbaseka Methodist Episcopal Church, South	Wabbaseka Methodist Episcopal Church, South	October 4, 2002 (#02001073)	U.S. Highway 79; 34°21′36″N 91°47′52″W	Wabbaseka	
73	John Brown Watson Memorial Library Building	John Brown Watson Memorial Library Building	January 13, 2006 (#05001073)	1200 N. University Dr. 34°14′42″N 92°01′13″W	Pine Bluff	
74	West James Street Overpass	West James Street Overpass	May 18, 1995 (#95000609)	W. James St. over Union Pacific railroad tracks 34°26′44″N 92°11′06″W	Redfield	
75	Yauch-Ragar House	Yauch-Ragar House	January 20, 1978 (#78000602)	625 State St. 34°13′28″N 92°00′07″W	Pine Bluff	

== Former listings ==
	Name on the Register	Image	Date listed	Date removed	Location	City or town	Description
1	Austin House		December 22, 1982 (#82000842)	December 28, 2002	704 West 5th Avenue	Pine Bluff	
2	Floyd B. Brown House		January 19, 2006 (#04001493)	January 26, 2018	1401 S. Georgia St. 34°13′02″N 92°00′00″W	Pine Bluff	
3	Collier House		December 22, 1982 (#82000844)	January 23, 2008	1227 West 5th Street	Pine Bluff	A Bungalow/Craftsman. Delisted due to significant alterations.
4	Dilley House		August 3, 1977 (#77000258)	January 26, 2018	656 Laurel St. 34°13′24″N 92°00′30″W	Pine Bluff	Destroyed by fire April 28, 2015.
5	Gracie House		December 22, 1982 (#82000846)	January 24, 2019	Off Highway 88; 34°13′36″N 91°46′33″W	New Gascony	
6	Hospital and Benevolent Association		December 22, 1982 (#82000841)	January 25, 2010	11th and Cherry; 34°13′04″N 92°00′50″W	Pine Bluff	Demolished in May 2009
7	Dr. John Walter Parker Sr. House		September 25, 2003 (#03000947)	January 26, 2018	1405 S. Alabama St. 34°12′54″N 92°00′03″W	Pine Bluff	
8	Pine Bluff Confederate Monument	Pine Bluff Confederate Monument	April 26, 1996 (#96000464)	May 12, 2021	Northern side of the Jefferson County Courthouse at the junction of Barraque and Main Sts. 34°13′49″N 92°00′11″W	Pine Bluff	
9	Russell House		December 22, 1982 (#82000852)	September 20, 2006	1617 South Olive Street; 34°12′44″N 92°00′24″W	Pine Bluff	A Bungalow/Craftsman. Removed due to significant alteration.
10	Williams Building		November 16, 2010 (#10000833)	September 25, 2012	418-420 N. University; 34°13′59″N 92°01′10″W	Pine Bluff	

== See also ==
- List of National Historic Landmarks in Arkansas
- National Register of Historic Places listings in Arkansas
