= DODX Guard Car No. G-56 =

Historic American WWII era railroad card

DODX Guard Car #6-56
- Manufacturer: American Car and Foundry Company
- Constructed: c. 1942
- DODX Guard Car #G-56
- U.S. National Register of Historic Places
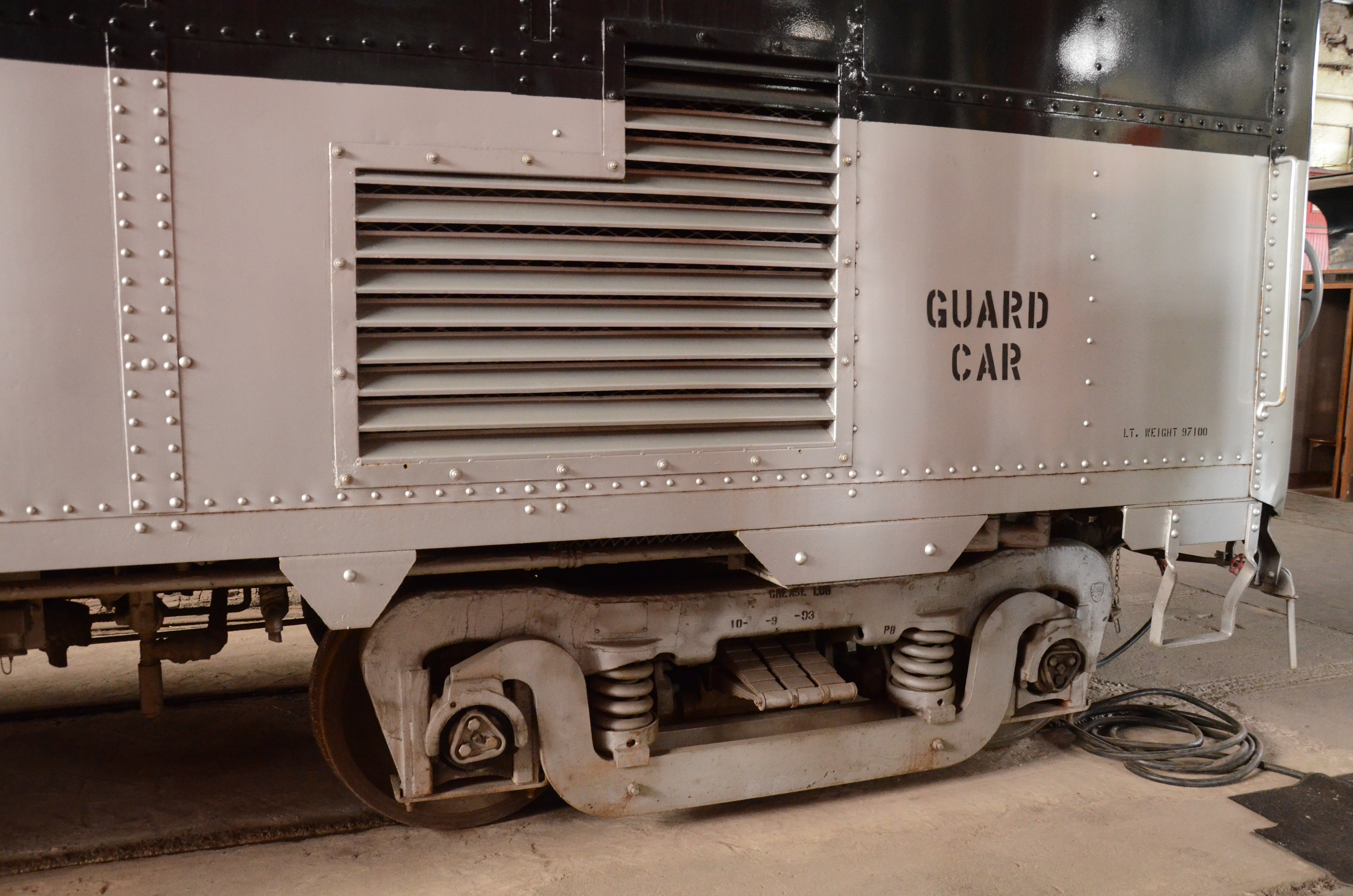

- Location within Arkansas Location within the United States
- Location: 1700 Port Rd., Pine Bluff, Arkansas
- Coordinates: 34°13′47″N 91°59′6″W
- Built: 1950
- Built by: American Car and Foundry Company
- NRHP reference No.: 07000441
- Added to NRHP: June 28, 2007

The DODX Guard Car No. G-56 is a historic railroad car at the Arkansas Railroad Museum in Pine Bluff, Arkansas. It was built about 1942 by the American Car and Foundry Company, and is a rare surviving example of a World War II troop transport, and as a railroad guard car used by the United States Department of Defense in the management of hazardous and valuable cargos that it transported by rail. The car is silver, with a horizontal black stripe on the side.

The car was listed on the National Register of Historic Places in 2007.

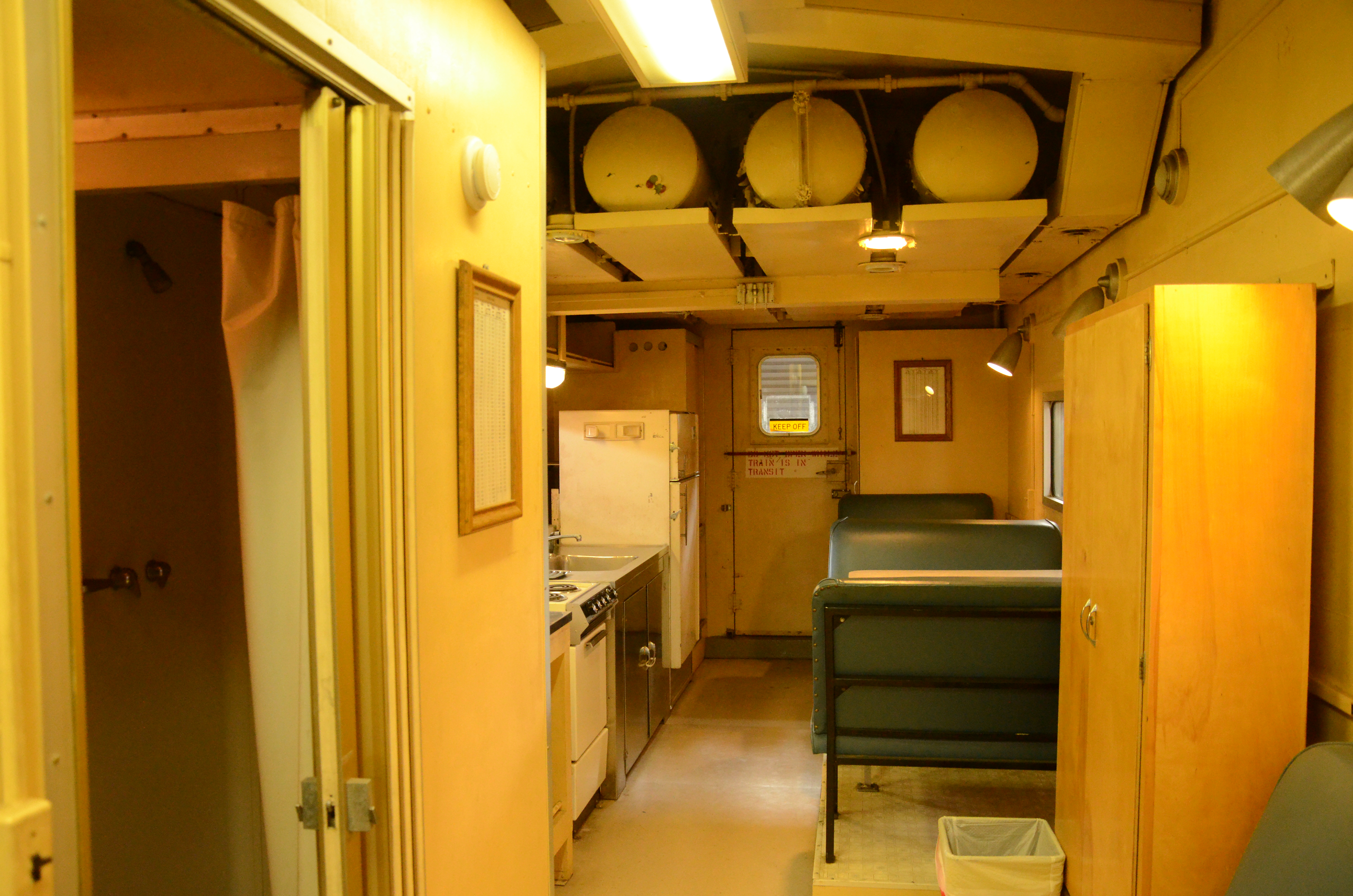
Forward interior of car

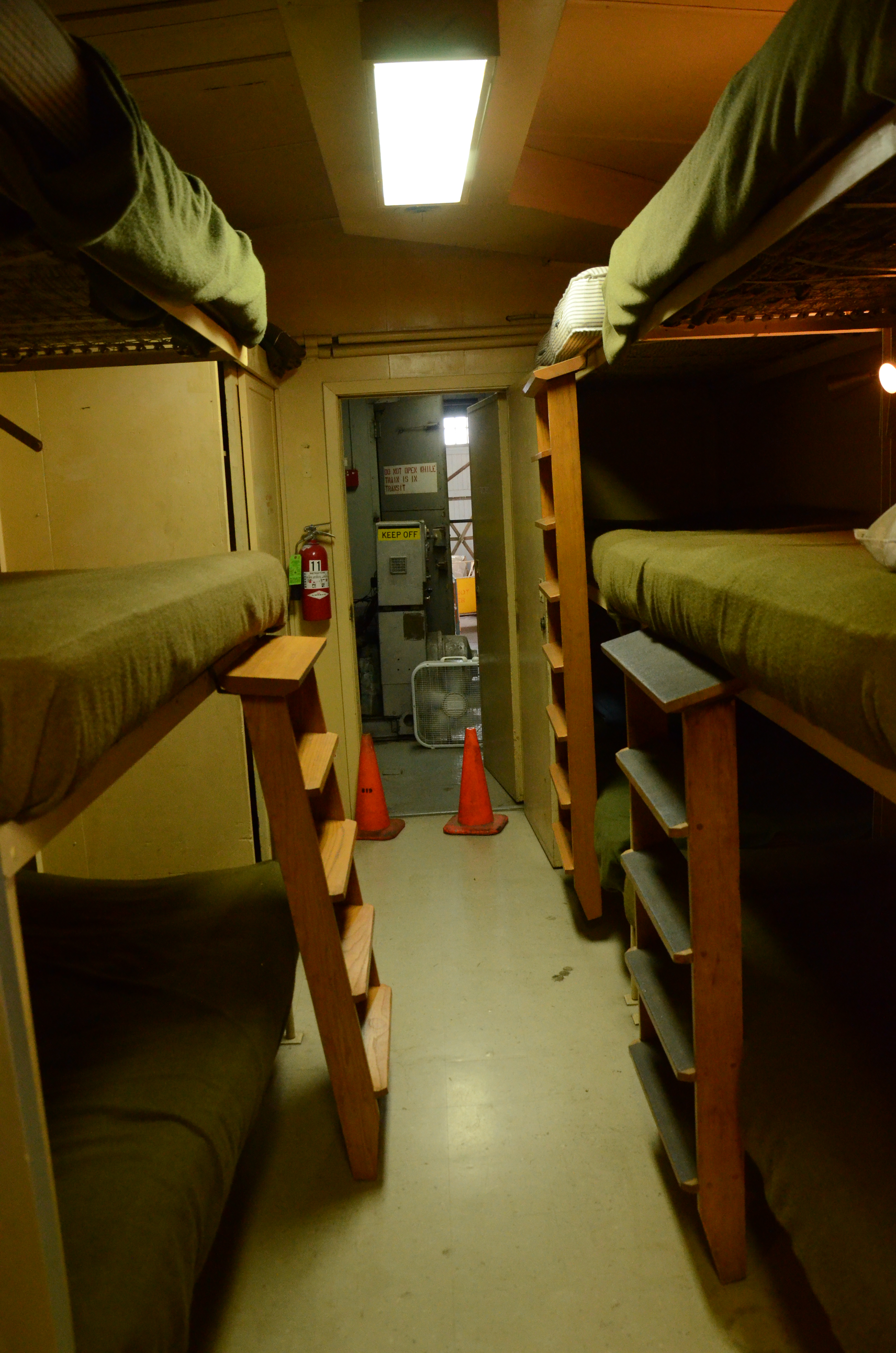
Rear interior

== See also ==
- National Register of Historic Places listings in Jefferson County, Arkansas
