= Katzenstein House =

Historic house in Arkansas, United States

- U.S. National Register of Historic Places
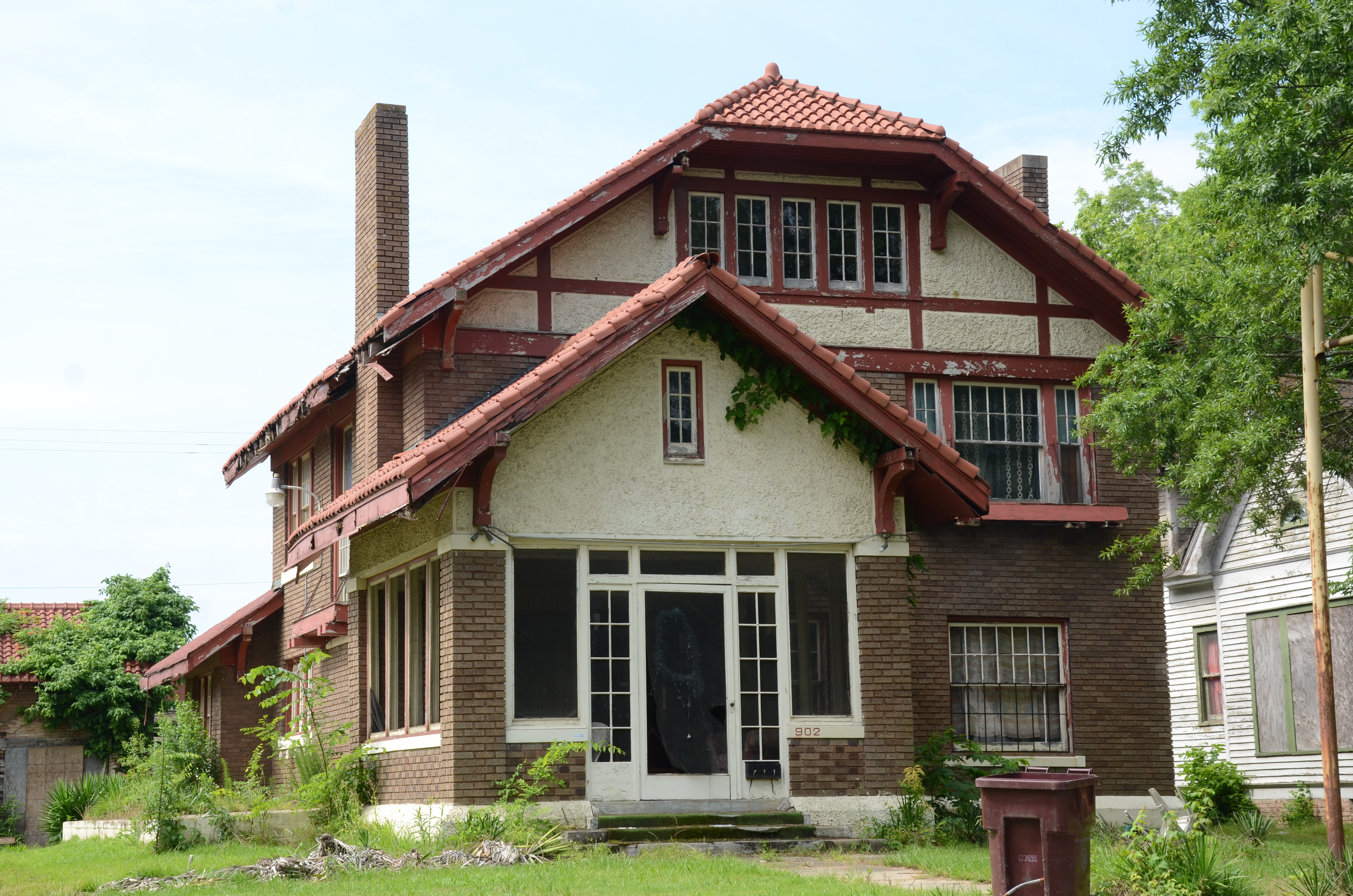

- Location within Arkansas Location within the United States
- Location: 902 W. 5th St., Pine Bluff, Arkansas
- Coordinates: 34°13′30″N 92°0′46″W
- Area: less than one acre
- Built: 1913
- Architect: Charles L. Thompson
- Architectural style: Bungalow/craftsman
- MPS: Thompson, Charles L., Design Collection TR
- NRHP reference No.: 82000850
- Added to NRHP: December 22, 1982

The Katzenstein House is a historic house at 902 West 5th Street in Pine Bluff, Arkansas. It is a two-story brick building, capped by a clipped-gable tile roof. An enclosed front porch projects from the left side of the front. The main gable features a band of five casement windows, and both the main gable and the porch gable feature half-timbered stucco finish. The house was designed by Charles L. Thompson and built in 1913. It is an unusual blending of Craftsman styling applied to an largely American Foursquare plan.

The house was listed on the National Register of Historic Places in 1982.

== See also ==
- National Register of Historic Places listings in Jefferson County, Arkansas
