= W.E. O'Bryant Bell Tower =

- U.S. National Register of Historic Places
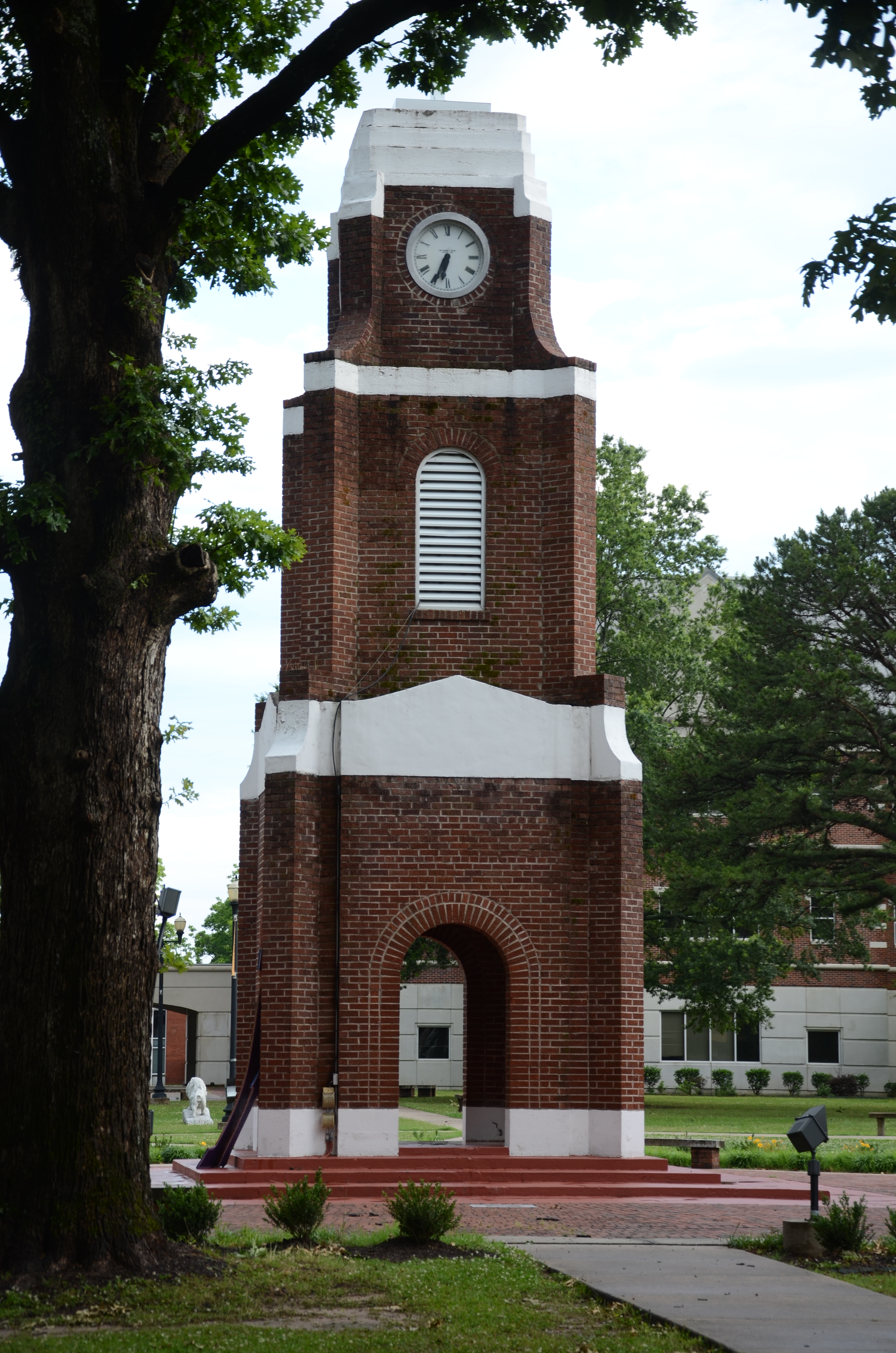

- Location within Arkansas Location within the United States
- Location: 1200 N. University Dr., campus of the University of Arkansas at Pine Bluff, Pine Bluff, Arkansas
- Coordinates: 34°14′32″N 92°1′14.2″W
- Area: less than one acre
- Built: 1943
- Architect: A.A. Mazique
- Architectural style: Collegiate bell tower
- NRHP reference No.: 98000622
- Added to NRHP: June 3, 1998

The W.E. O'Bryant Bell Tower occupies a prominent central position on the campus of the University of Arkansas at Pine Bluff in Pine Bluff, Arkansas. It is a three-stage brick structure, with open arches at the base where a fountain once stood. The second stage houses a belfry, and the third a clock. The corners are buttressed, and the levels divided by bands of concrete. The tower was built in 1943–47.

The tower was listed on the National Register of Historic Places in 1998.

== See also ==
- National Register of Historic Places listings in Jefferson County, Arkansas
