= Dilley House =

- Formerly listed on the U.S. National Register of Historic Places
- Location within Arkansas Location within the United States
- Location: 656 Laurel St., Pine Bluff, Arkansas
- Coordinates: 34°13′24″N 92°0′30″W
- Area: less than one acre
- Built: 1902
- NRHP reference No.: 77000258

Significant dates
- Added to NRHP: August 3, 1977
- Removed from NRHP: January 26, 2018

The Dilley House is a former historic house at 656 Laurel Street in Pine Bluff, Arkansas. It is a two-story wood-frame structure, finished in beveled weatherboard siding, and capped by a hip roof. It has an irregular plan, with a stepped series of projections on the front right side giving it a roughly triangular shape. The main entrance is set in the second projecting, under a porch with a gabled roof. The interior retains original woodwork, plaster, and wall finishes including wallpaper. The house was built about 1902 for the family of Frederick L. Dilley, owner of a foundry that was one of the city's major industries. Its second owner, E.A. Howell, was mayor of Pine Bluff and major promoter of the cotton industry in the area.

The house was listed on the National Register of Historic Places in 1977. It was destroyed by fire in 2015 and delisted in January 2018.

== See also ==
- National Register of Historic Places listings in Jefferson County, Arkansas
