= Jewel Bain House No. 4 =

Historic house in Arkansas, United States

- U.S. National Register of Historic Places
- Location within Arkansas Location within the United States
- Location: 27 Longmeadow, Pine Bluff, Arkansas
- Coordinates: 34°11′38″N 92°1′14″W
- Area: less than one acre
- Built: 1965
- Architectural style: Modern Movement
- NRHP reference No.: 100001649
- Added to NRHP: September 21, 2017

The Jewel Bain House Number 4 is a historic house at 27 Longmeadow in Pine Bluff, Arkansas. The house was built about 1965, designed by architect Jewel Bain, one of the few female architects working in Arkansas at the time. It is a U-shaped single-story brick structure, with sections covered by separately hipped roofs that have extended eaves with exposed rafter tails. The roof is covered with distinctive tiles imported from Japan. Some windows are covered by wooden Japanese screens.

The house was listed on the National Register of Historic Places in 2017.

== See also ==
- National Register of Historic Places listings in Jefferson County, Arkansas
