= R.M. Knox House =

Historic house in Arkansas, United States

- R. M. Knox House
- U.S. National Register of Historic Places
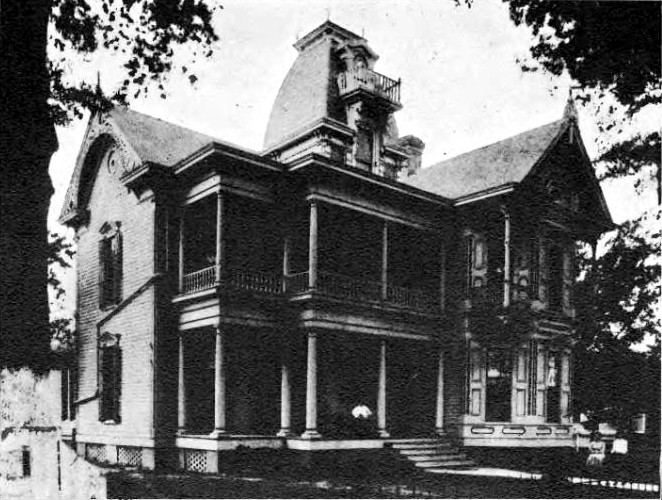
- 1905 photo

- Location within Arkansas Location within the United States
- Location: 1504 W. 6th St., Pine Bluff, Arkansas
- Coordinates: 34°13′24″N 92°1′4″W
- Area: less than one acre
- Built: 1885
- Architectural style: Late Victorian, Eastlake Victorian
- NRHP reference No.: 75000395
- Added to NRHP: June 5, 1975

The R.M. Knox House is a historic house at 1504 West 6th Street in Pine Bluff, Arkansas. It is a two-story wood-frame structure, with a T-shaped floor plan and a cross-gable roof. A mansard-roofed tower rises at the center of the house, and an elaborately decorated two-story porch extends across a portion of the front. The house was built in 1885 for Richard Morris Knox, a veteran of the American Civil War. It is one of the state's finest and most elaborate examples of the Eastlake style.

The house was built by C.J. Faucette, architect and builder. The story is that Knox paid Faucette to build it with gold coins.

The house was listed on the National Register of Historic Places in 1975.

Google Street View imagery currently shows the house in a state of disrepair. Restoration of the house commenced in 2026.

== See also ==
- National Register of Historic Places listings in Jefferson County, Arkansas
