= St. Louis Southwestern Railway (Cotton Belt Route) Relief Train =

- Manufacturers: Industrial Brownhoist and others
- Constructed: c. 1940
- St. Louis Southwestern Railway (Cotton Belt Route) Relief Train
- U.S. National Register of Historic Places
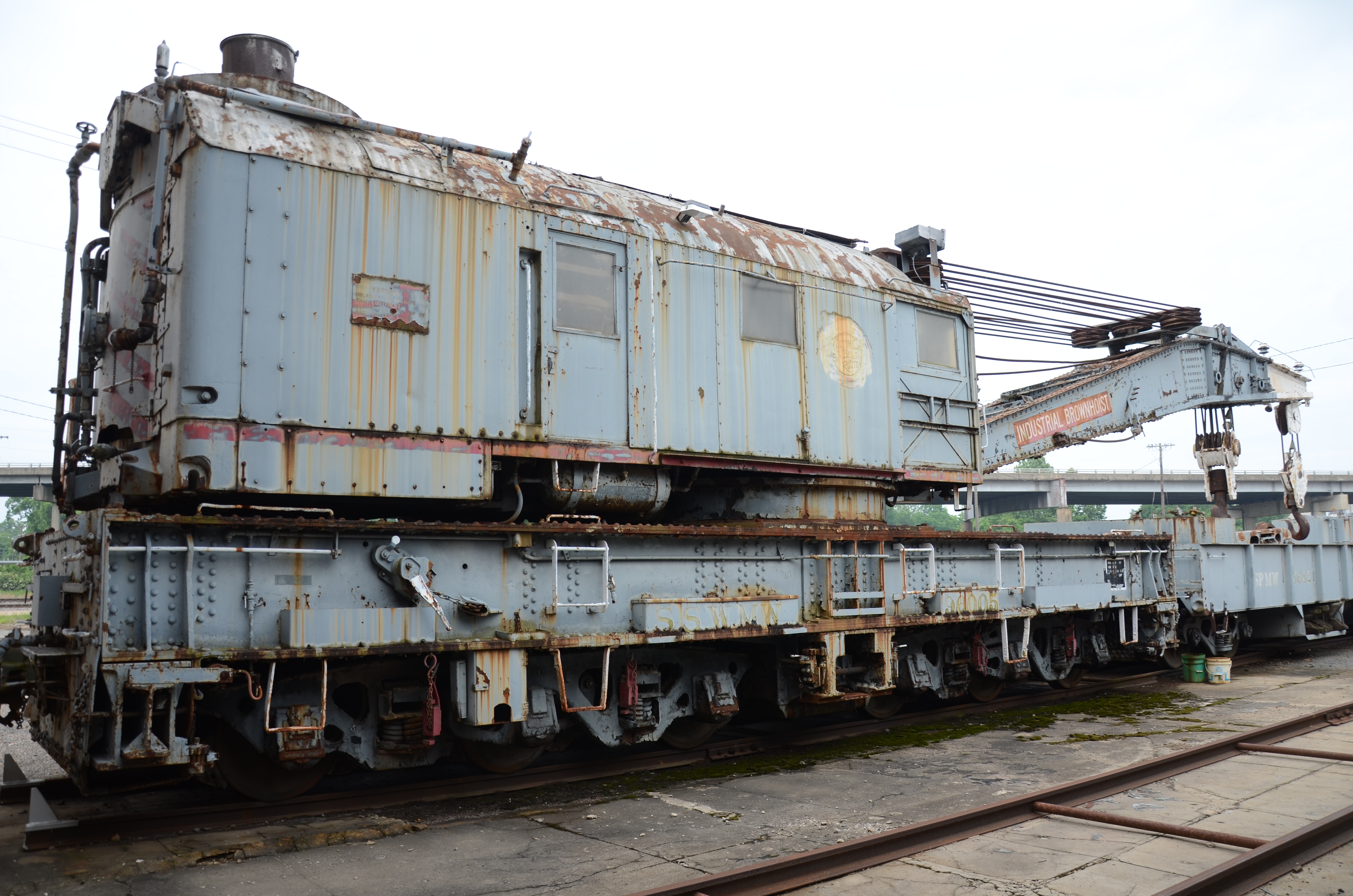

- Location within Arkansas Location within the United States
- Location: 1700 Port Rd., Arkansas Railroad Museum, Pine Bluff, Arkansas
- Coordinates: 34°13′45″N 91°59′9″W
- Built: 1940
- Built by: Industrial Brownhoist
- NRHP reference No.: 07000471
- Added to NRHP: May 25, 2007

The St. Louis Southwestern Railway (Cotton Belt Route) Relief Train is a railroad rescue and recovery train, its elements now on display at the Arkansas Railroad Museum in Pine Bluff, Arkansas. The train's principal feature is a large steam crane (SSW 96005), built by Industrial Brownhoist of Bay City, Michigan in 1940. Other elements of the train include a boom car, generator flat, kitchen car, tool car, and crew sleeper. The boom car, a low gondola car, was attached to the train below the projecting section of the train; the other elements of the train supported the crew and the operation of the crane to clear derailments. The relief train was assembled by the St. Louis Southwestern Railway (a.k.a. the Cotton Belt Run), and remained in active service until 1996, when it was given to the museum.

The train was listed on the National Register of Historic Places in 2007.

== See also ==
- National Register of Historic Places listings in Jefferson County, Arkansas
