= Howson House =

Historic house in Arkansas, United States

- U.S. National Register of Historic Places
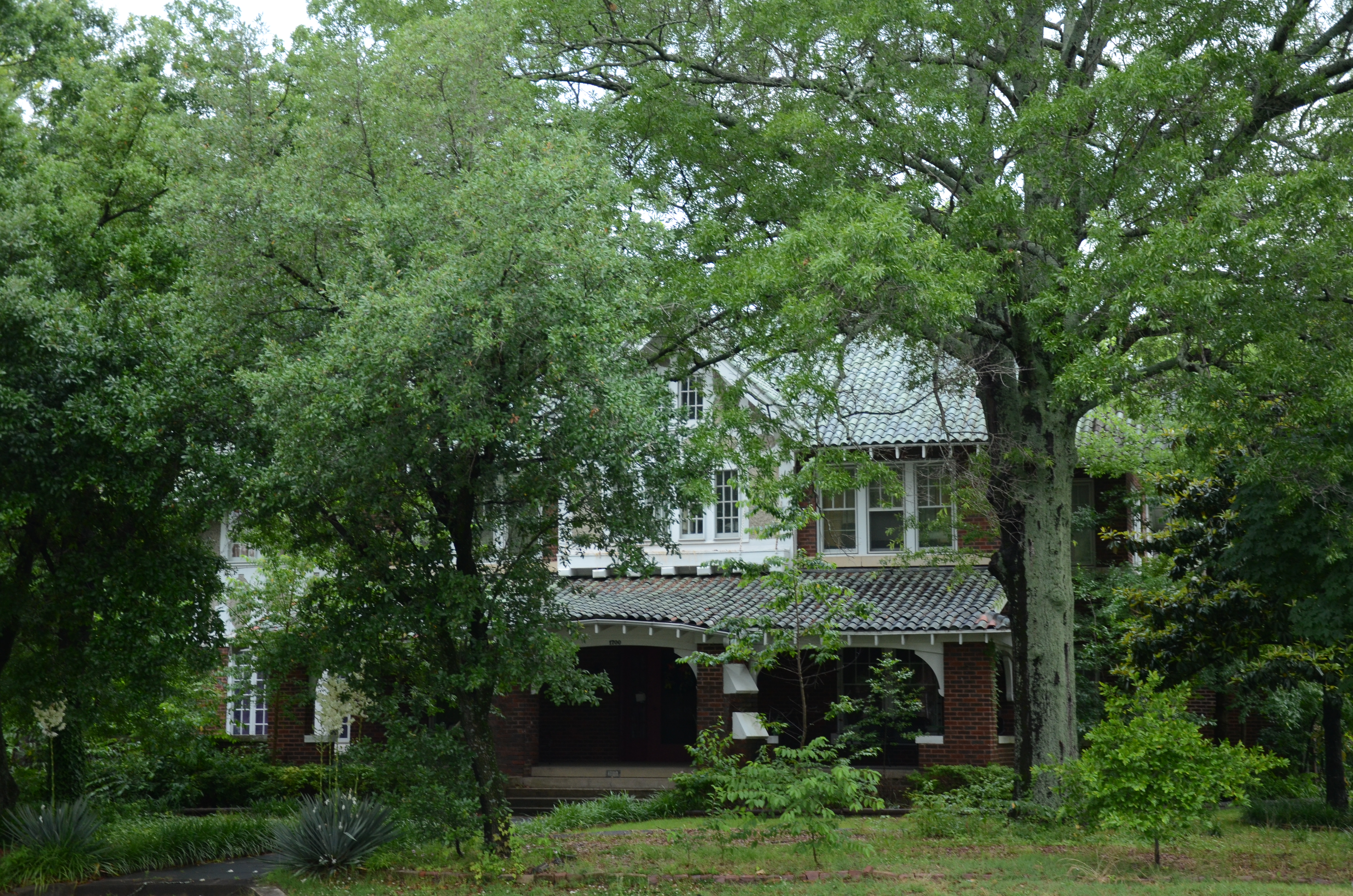

- Location within Arkansas Location within the United States
- Location: 1700 S. Olive St., Pine Bluff, Arkansas
- Coordinates: 34°12′41″N 92°0′25″W
- Area: less than one acre
- Built: 1918
- Architect: Thompson & Harding
- Architectural style: Bungalow/American Craftsman, Tudor Revival
- MPS: Thompson, Charles L., Design Collection TR
- NRHP reference No.: 82000847
- Added to NRHP: December 22, 1982

The Howson House is a historic house at 1700 South Olive Street in Pine Bluff, Arkansas. It is a 2 1/2-story structure, faced in brick on the first floor and half-timbered stucco on the second. A single-story porch extends across the main facade, supported by square brick piers, with exposed rafter ends in the shed roof. The house was designed by the noted Arkansas firm of Thompson & Harding, and was built in 1918.

The house was listed on the National Register of Historic Places in 1982.

== See also ==
- National Register of Historic Places listings in Jefferson County, Arkansas
