= Ferguson House (Pine Bluff, Arkansas) =

Historic house in Arkansas, United States

- U.S. National Register of Historic Places
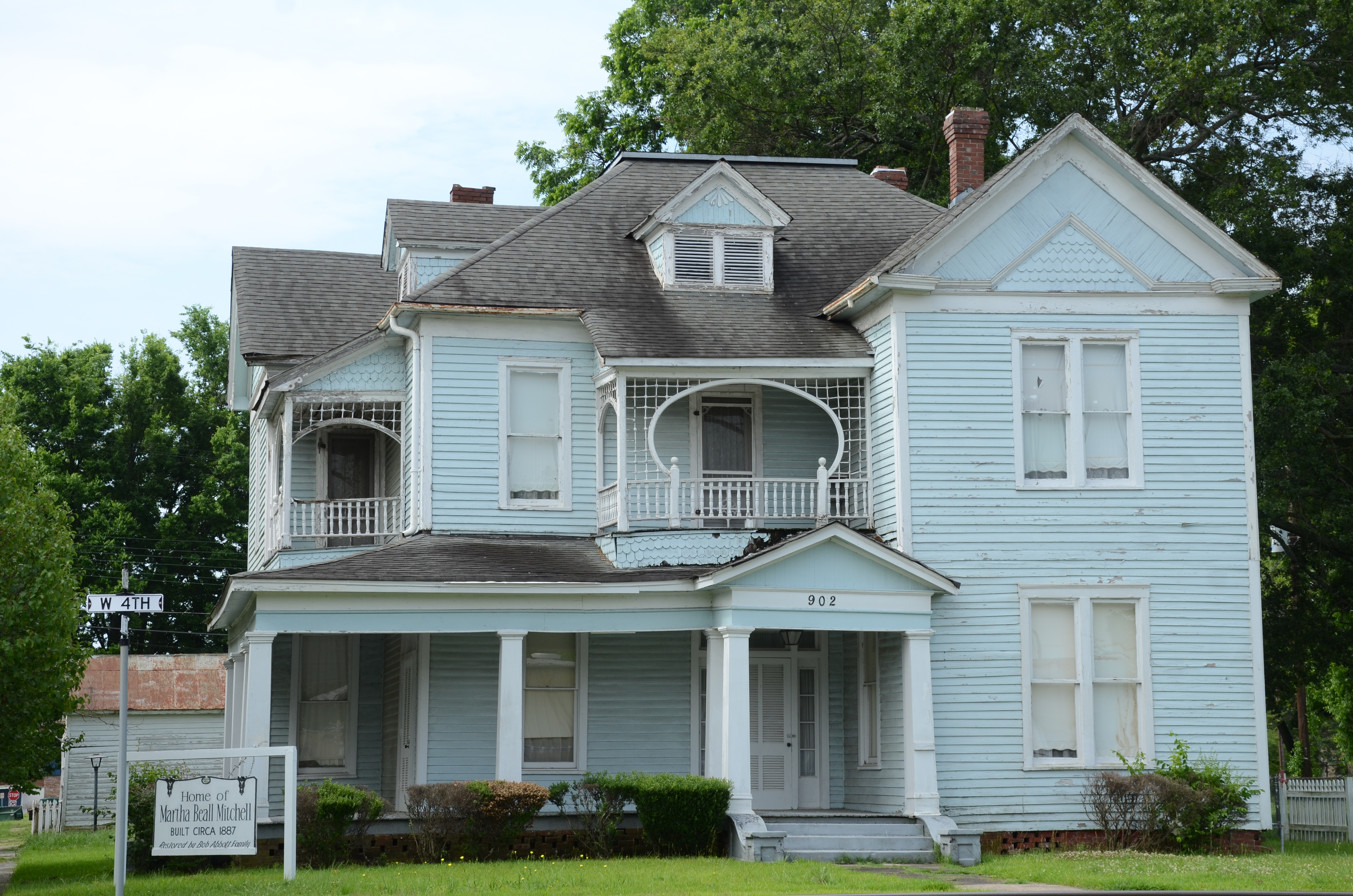

- Location within Arkansas Location within the United States
- Location: 902 E. 4th Ave., Pine Bluff, Arkansas
- Coordinates: 34°13′33″N 92°0′42″W
- Area: less than one acre
- Built: 1896
- Architectural style: Queen Anne
- NRHP reference No.: 78000598
- Added to NRHP: January 18, 1978

The Ferguson House is a historic house at 902 East 4th Street in Pine Bluff, Arkansas. It is a two-story wood-frame structure, with a hip roof and clapboard siding. It has a variety of projecting gable sections, dormers, and porches typical of the Queen Anne style. The interior features high-quality woodwork, including fireplace mantels, and a particularly ornate main staircase. It was built in 1896 by Calvin Ferguson, a local builder, for his family.

The house was listed on the National Register of Historic Places in 1978.

== See also ==
- National Register of Historic Places listings in Jefferson County, Arkansas
