= Hudson-Grace-Borreson House =

Historic house in Arkansas, United States

- U.S. National Register of Historic Places
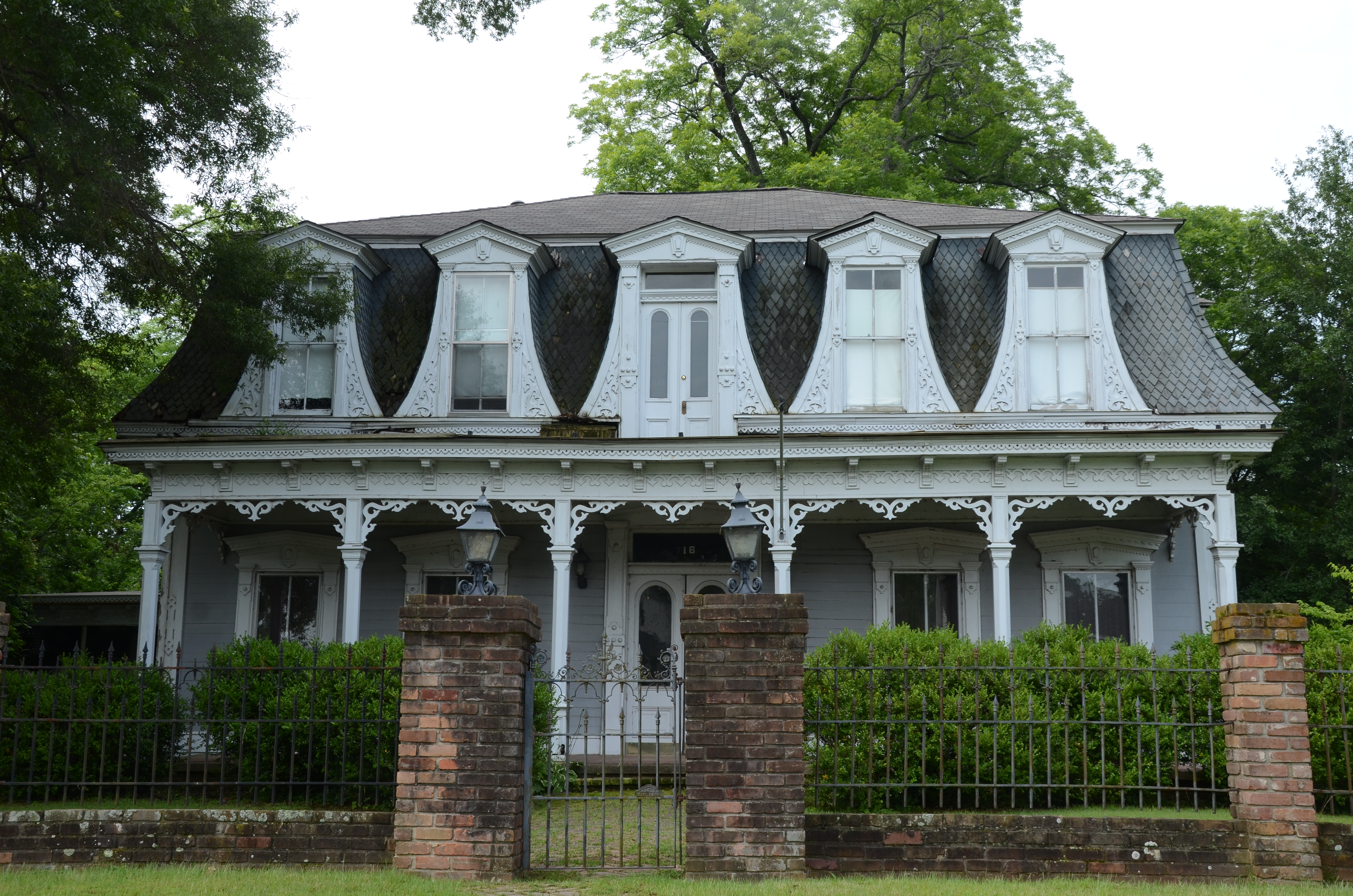

- Location within Arkansas Location within the United States
- Location: 719 W. Barraque, Pine Bluff, Arkansas
- Coordinates: 34°13′44″N 92°0′30″W
- Area: less than one acre
- Built: 1830
- Architectural style: Greek Revival, Late Victorian, New Orleans French
- NRHP reference No.: 71000126
- Added to NRHP: June 24, 1971

The Hudson-Grace-Borreson House is a historic house at 719 West Barraque Street in Pine Bluff, Arkansas. With an evolutionary construction history dating to about 1830, it is a unique and distinctive blend of Greek Revival, Second Empire, and New Orleans French architectural styles. It is a 1 1/2-story wood-frame structure, finished in bevel siding, with a dormered mansard roof that has an original iron railing at the boundary between the roof slopes. It has a porch extending across the front, featuring hexagonal posts and delicate turned woodwork. The house began as a two-room cabin about 1830, and was enlarged and altered in 1860. Its most prominent owner, William Grace, was a local lawyer, politician, and veteran of the American Civil War.

The house was listed on the National Register of Historic Places in 1971.

== See also ==
- National Register of Historic Places listings in Jefferson County, Arkansas
