= Carnahan House (Pine Bluff, Arkansas) =

Historic house in Arkansas, United States

- U.S. National Register of Historic Places
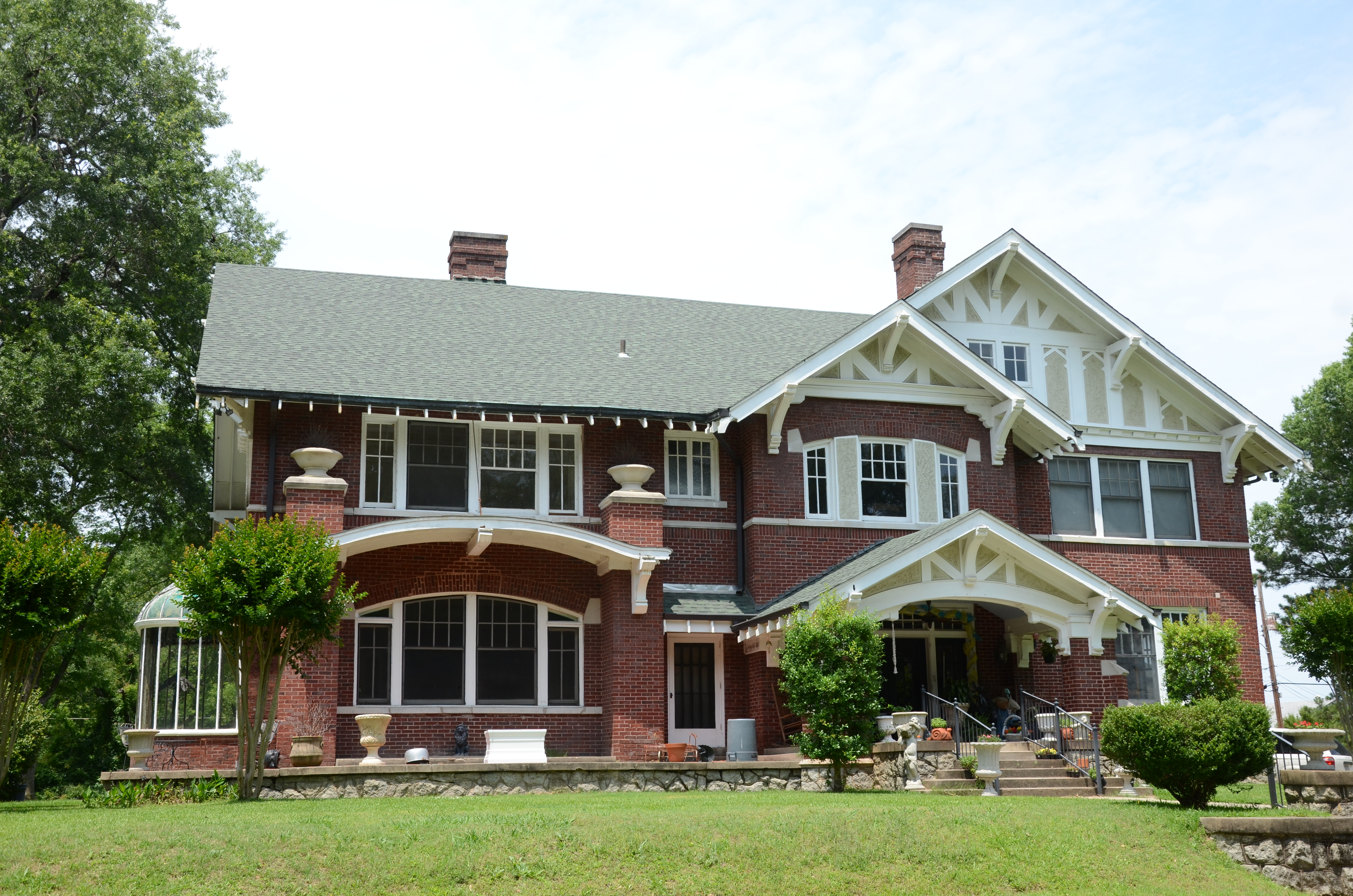

- Location within Arkansas Location within the United States
- Location: 1200 S. Laurel St., Pine Bluff, Arkansas
- Coordinates: 34°13′3″N 92°0′30″W
- Area: Less than one acre
- Built: 1919
- Architect: Mitchell Seligman
- NRHP reference No.: 14000790
- Added to NRHP: September 30, 2014

The Carnahan House is a historic house at 1200 South Laurel Street in Pine Bluff, Arkansas. Built in 1919, it is a high-quality example of Craftsman and Tudor Revival styling, designed by Mitchell Seligman, a prolific local architect. It is a 2 1/2-story brick structure, with a side gable roof and a front-facing cross gable with half-timber stucco. The property includes a garage and guesthouse, also designed by Seligman.

The house was listed on the National Register of Historic Places in 2014.

== See also ==
- National Register of Historic Places listings in Jefferson County, Arkansas
