= Roth-Rosenzweig House =

Historic house in Arkansas, United States

- U.S. National Register of Historic Places
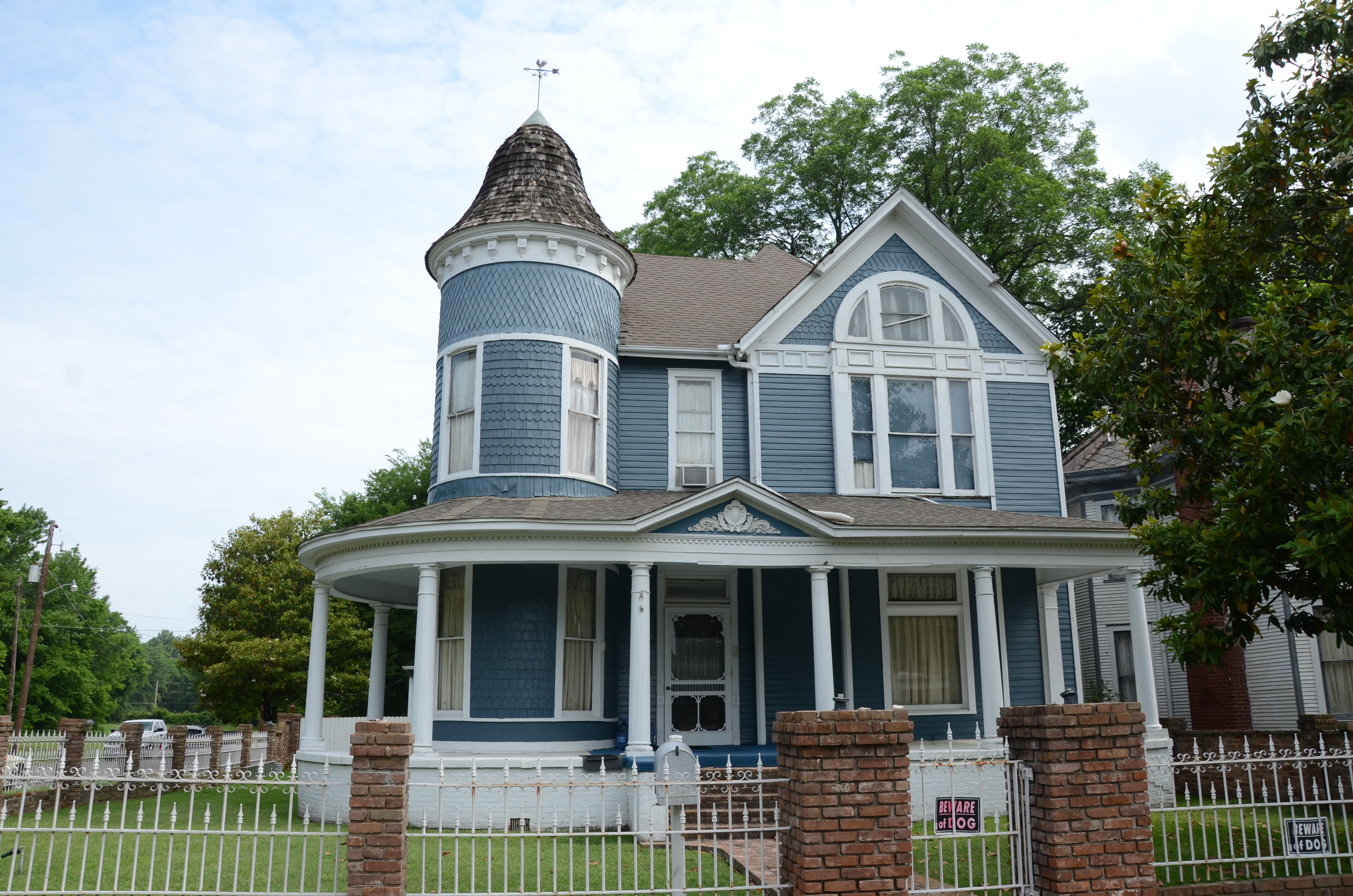

- Location within Arkansas Location within the United States
- Location: 717 W. 2nd Ave., Pine Bluff, Arkansas
- Coordinates: 34°13′43″N 92°0′34″W
- Area: less than one acre
- Built: 1894
- Built by: W.S. Helton
- Architectural style: Queen Anne
- NRHP reference No.: 76000423
- Added to NRHP: December 12, 1976

The Roth-Rosenzweig House is a historic house at 717 West 2nd Avenue in Pine Bluff, Arkansas. It is a 2 1/2-story wood-frame structure, with a wraparound porch and 2 1/2-story turret at the corner. The porch is supported by Tuscan columns, and has a small decorated gable above the stairs. The turret is clad in decoratively cut shingles, which are also banded on the main house gables. The interior has well-preserved period woodwork and finishes. The house was built in 1894, and is one Pine Bluff's finer examples of the Queen Anne style.

It was built by contractor W.S. Helton for $4,000.

The house was listed on the National Register of Historic Places in 1976.

== See also ==
- National Register of Historic Places listings in Jefferson County, Arkansas
