= Gibson-Burnham House =

Historic house in Arkansas, United States

- U.S. National Register of Historic Places
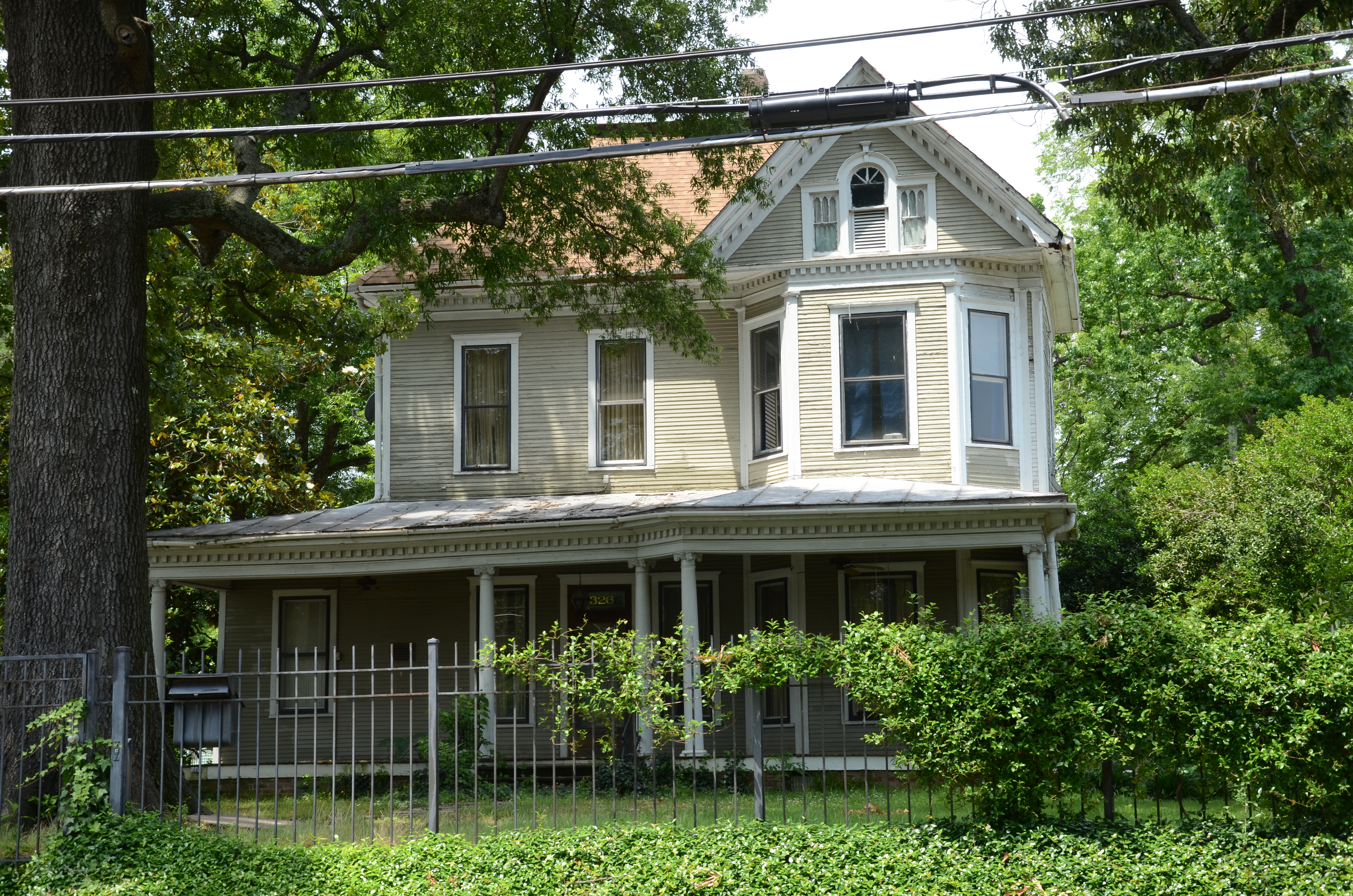

- Location within Arkansas Location within the United States
- Location: 1326 Cherry St., Pine Bluff, Arkansas
- Coordinates: 34°12′56″N 92°0′49″W
- Area: less than one acre
- Architectural style: Colonial Revival
- NRHP reference No.: 91000694
- Added to NRHP: June 5, 1991

The Gibson-Burnham House is a historic house at 1326 Cherry Street in Pine Bluff, Arkansas. It is a roughly L-shaped two story wood-frame structure, with a hip roof across its front and a gabled rear section. A single-story porch extends across the front, supported by Ionic columns. Its interior has well-preserved original woodwork, including notable a staircase built out of quarter-sawn oak and displayed at the 1904 St. Louis World's Fair. Built in 1904 by a local plantation owner, it is a fine local example of Colonial Revival architecture.

The house was listed on the National Register of Historic Places in 1991.

== See also ==
- National Register of Historic Places listings in Jefferson County, Arkansas
