= Trulock-Gould-Mullis House =

Historic house in Arkansas, United States

- U.S. National Register of Historic Places
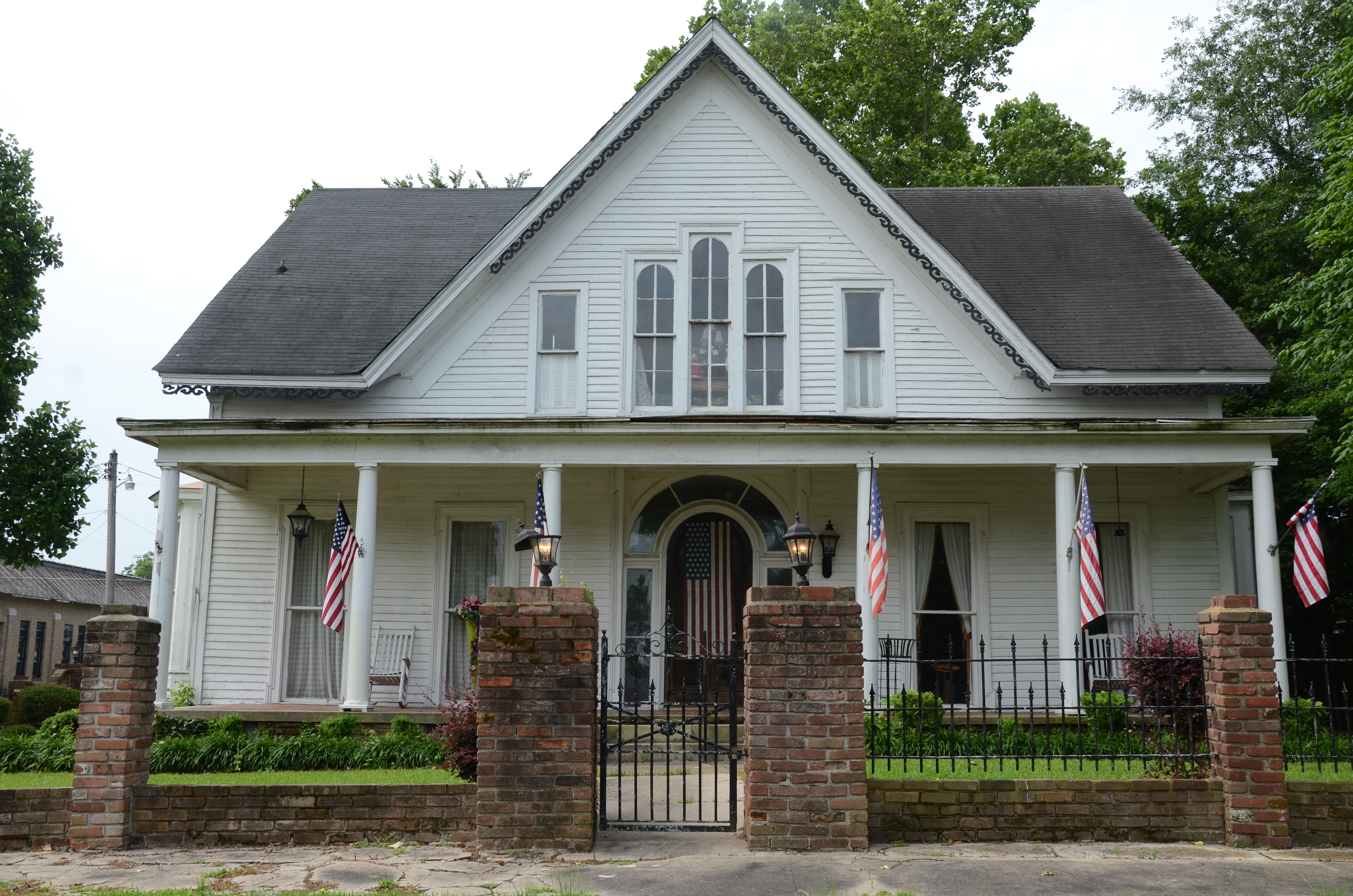

- Location within Arkansas Location within the United States
- Location: 704 W. Barraque St., Pine Bluff, Arkansas
- Coordinates: 34°13′46″N 92°0′35″W
- Area: less than one acre
- Built: 1876
- Architectural style: Gothic
- NRHP reference No.: 78003199
- Added to NRHP: January 3, 1978

The Trulock-Gould-Mullis House is a historic house at 704 West Barraque Street in Pine Bluff, Arkansas. It is a 1 1/2-story wood-frame structure, a gabled roof with a large cross gable, and clapboard siding. The cross gable is set over the main entrance, which is sheltered by a porch extending across the front facade. The gable has set in it three narrow round-arch windows, in a Palladian style where the outer windows are slightly smaller. The cornice line is decorated with bargeboard. The house was built in 1876 for Marshall Trulock, and is locally distinctive for its unusual Gothic features.

The house was listed on the National Register of Historic Places in 1978.

== See also ==
- National Register of Historic Places listings in Jefferson County, Arkansas
