= Jewel Bain House Number 2 =

Historic house in Arkansas, United States

- U.S. National Register of Historic Places
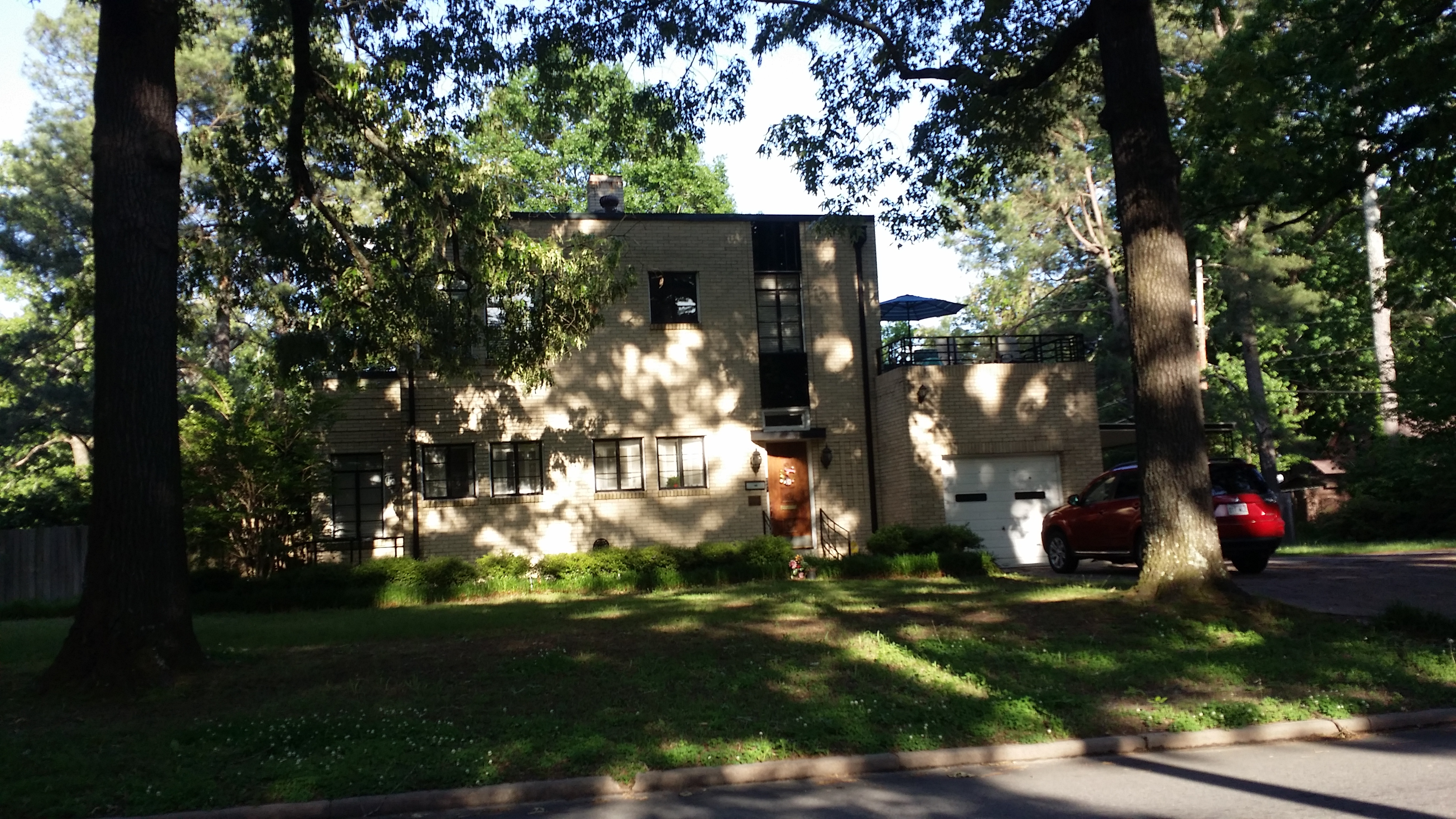

- Location within Arkansas Location within the United States
- Location: 3601 S. Cherry St., Pine Bluff, Arkansas
- Coordinates: 34°11′35″N 92°0′48″W
- Area: less than one acre
- Built: 1885
- Architectural style: Moderne
- NRHP reference No.: 12001228
- Added to NRHP: January 29, 2013

The Jewel Bain House Number 2 is a historic house at 3601 South Cherry Street in Pine Bluff, Arkansas. It is a roughly cubic brick structure, two stories in height, covered by a hip roof. The brick walls are accented with carrara glass. A carport extends from the main block to the south, and a single-story ell extends south. Built in 1937, the house was the second of four houses designed by Jewel Bain for her family. It is rare within the state as an excellent example of a residential application of the Moderne style of architecture.

The house was listed on the National Register of Historic Places in 2013.

== See also ==
- National Register of Historic Places listings in Jefferson County, Arkansas
