= Arkansas Louisiana Gas Company Building =

- U.S. National Register of Historic Places
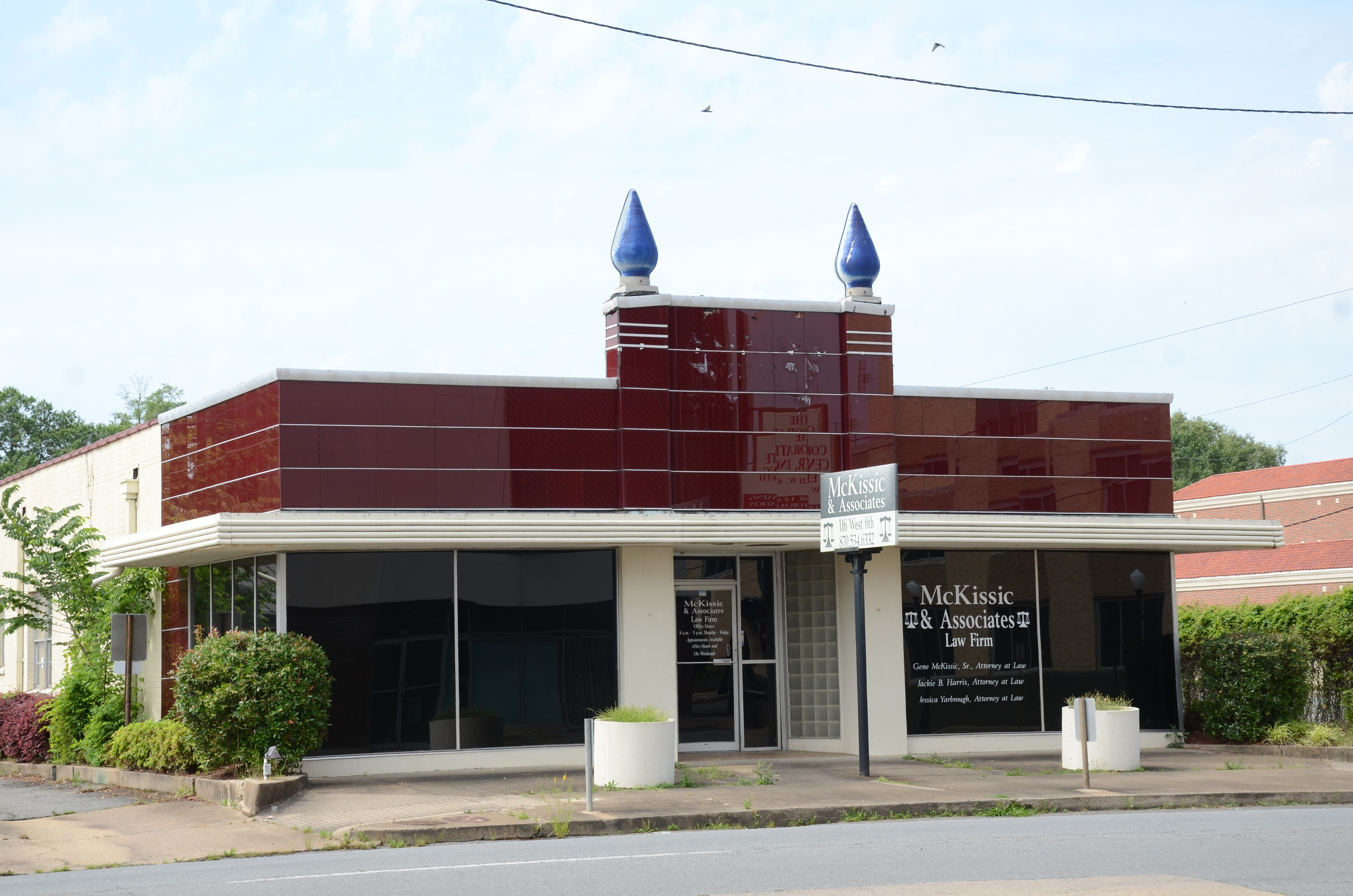

- Location within Arkansas Location within the United States
- Location: 116 W. 6th Avenue, Pine Bluff, Arkansas
- Coordinates: 34°13′25″N 92°0′14″W
- Area: less than one acre
- Built: 1950
- Architect: Selligman, Mitchell
- Architectural style: Moderne
- NRHP reference No.: 01000480
- Added to NRHP: May 10, 2001

The Arkansas Louisiana Gas Company Building is a historic commercial building at 116 West 6th Avenue in Pine Bluff, Arkansas. It is a single story masonry structure with distinctive Moderne styling. Its most prominent feature is the parapet, which was Art Deco-style blue flame-shaped finials at the ends of the central raised section. Its walls include blocks of colored and clear glass, and tile elements. It was built in 1950, during a building boom that followed the end of World War II, and is the best local example of this type of architecture.

The building was listed on the National Register of Historic Places in 2001.

== See also ==
- National Register of Historic Places listings in Jefferson County, Arkansas
