= Dr. John Walter Parker Sr. House =

Historic house in Arkansas, United States

- Formerly listed on the U.S. National Register of Historic Places
- Location within Arkansas Location within the United States
- Location: 1405 S. Alabama St., Pine Bluff, Arkansas
- Coordinates: 34°12′54″N 92°0′3″W
- Area: 0.3 acres (0.12 ha)
- Built: 1909
- Architectural style: Queen Anne
- NRHP reference No.: 03000947

Significant dates
- Added to NRHP: September 25, 2003
- Removed from NRHP: January 26, 2018

The Dr. John Walter Parker Sr. House is a historic house at 1405 South Alabama Street in Pine Bluff, Arkansas. It is a single-story brick building, with a complex gabled roof line and a porch that curves from the front around to the left side. Built in 1909–10, it is believed to be one of the first brick houses in the community to be built for, and owned by, an African American. John Walker Parker, for whom it was built, was a dentist who opened his practice in Pine Bluff in 1905.

The house was listed on the National Register of Historic Places in 2003. It was delisted in 2018.

== See also ==
- National Register of Historic Places listings in Jefferson County, Arkansas
