= Trulock-Cook House =

Historic house in Arkansas, United States

- U.S. National Register of Historic Places
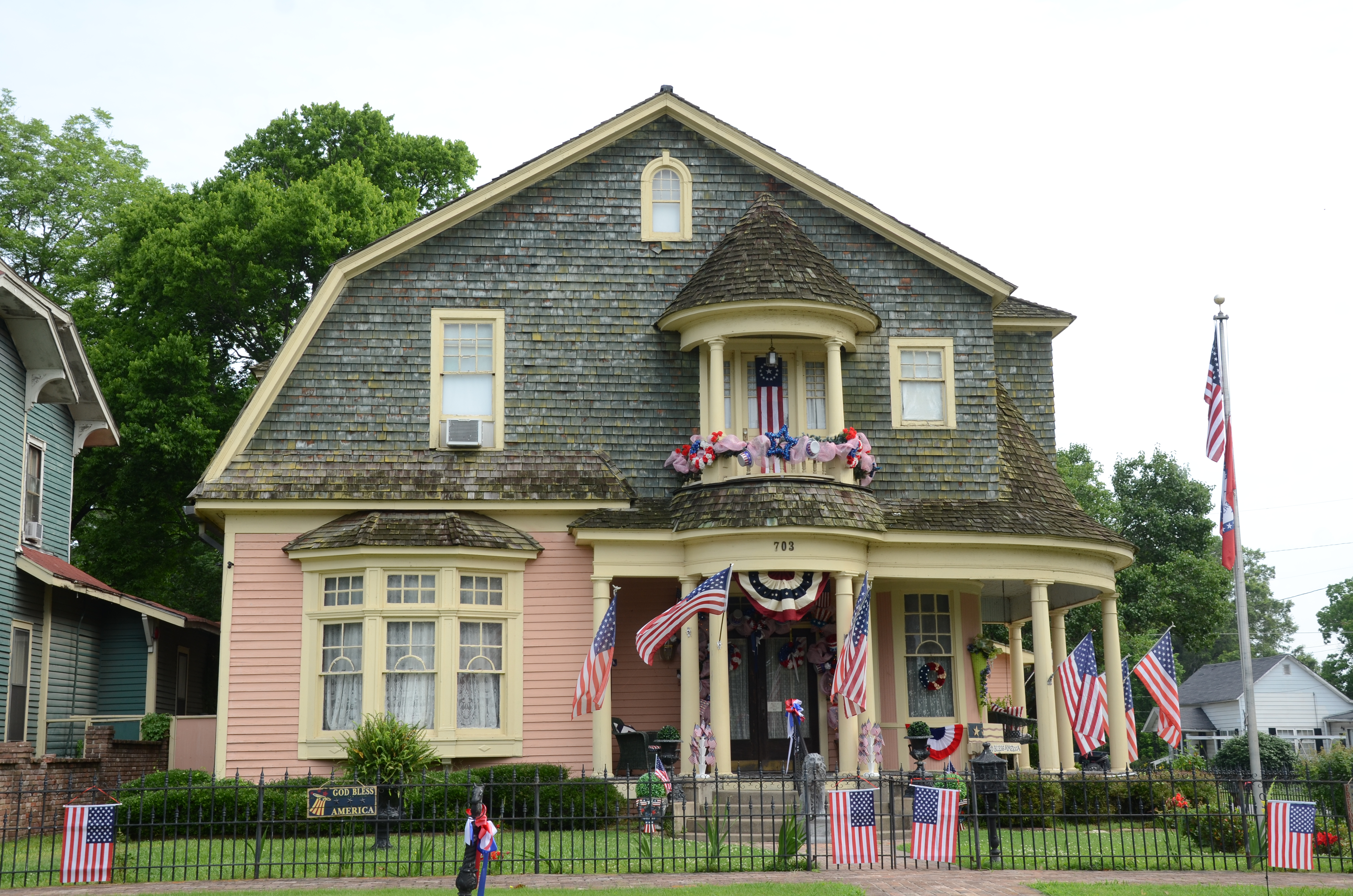

- Location within Arkansas Location within the United States
- Location: 703 W. 2nd Ave., Pine Bluff, Arkansas
- Coordinates: 34°13′43″N 92°0′38″W
- Area: less than one acre
- Built: 1903
- Architectural style: Colonial Revival, Shingle Style
- NRHP reference No.: 79000444
- Added to NRHP: February 21, 1979

The Trulock-Cook House is a historic house at 703 West 2nd Avenue in Pine Bluff, Arkansas. It is a 1 1/2-story wood-frame structure, built about 1903 in an unusual combination of Shingle and Colonial Revival styles. It has a two-stage gambrel roof, which slopes down in one section to form the roof of a single-story porch that wraps around the porch on the southwest corner. The porch also wraps around a semicircular bay that rises above the main entrance, and is supported by Tuscan columns. The house is one of Pine Bluff's few surviving Shingle style buildings.

The house was listed on the National Register of Historic Places in 1979.

== See also ==
- National Register of Historic Places listings in Jefferson County, Arkansas
