= Parkview Apartments (Pine Bluff, Arkansas) =

- U.S. National Register of Historic Places
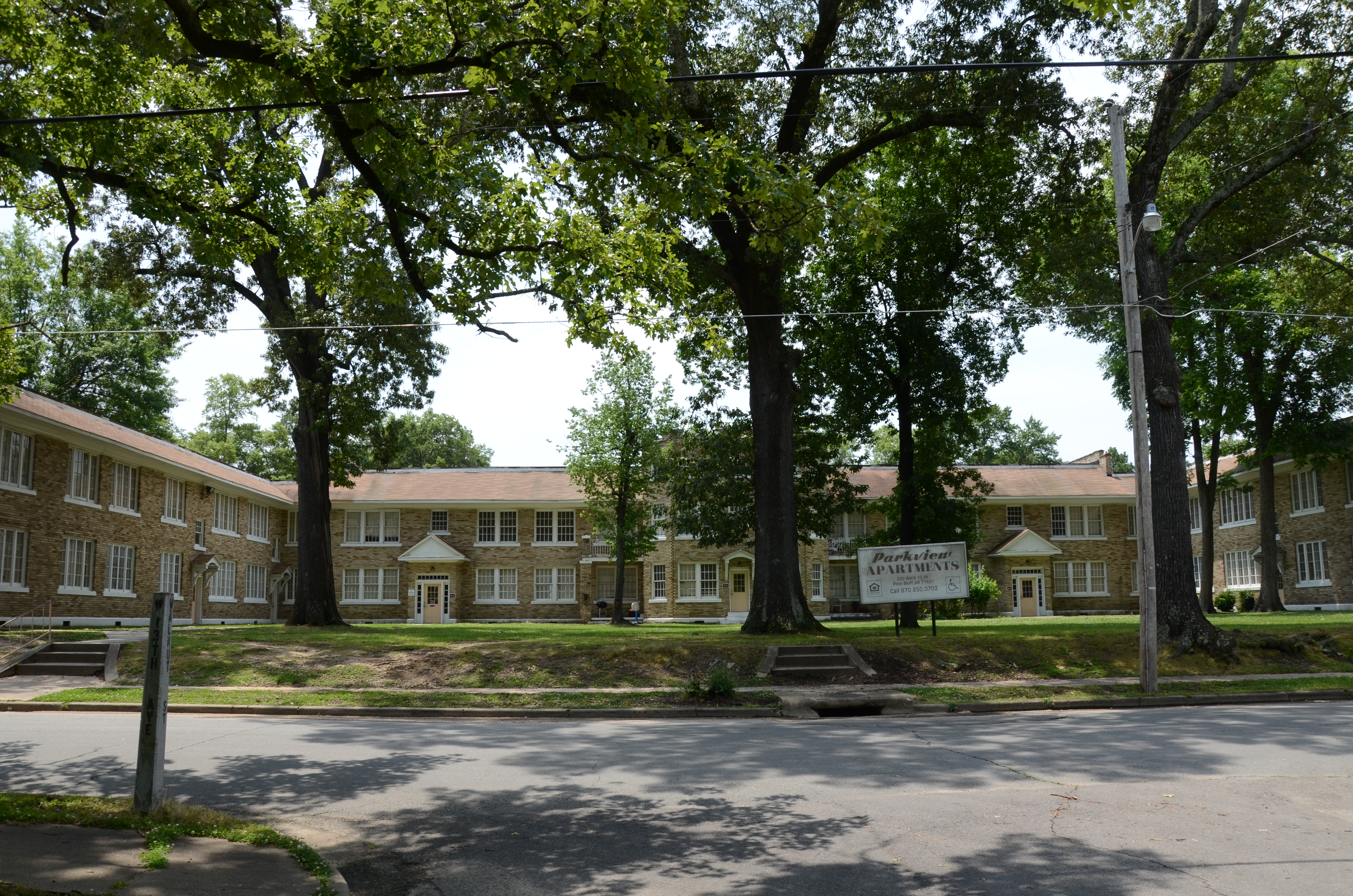
- Parkview Apartments in 2016

- Location within Arkansas Location within the United States
- Location: 300 W. 13th Ave., Pine Bluff, Arkansas
- Coordinates: 34°12′58″N 92°0′20″W
- Area: less than one acre
- Built: 1925
- Architect: Mitchell Seligman
- Architectural style: Late 19th And 20th Century Revivals, Art Deco, Collegiate Gothic;Ital. Ren.
- NRHP reference No.: 89000335
- Added to NRHP: May 1, 1989

The Parkview Apartments is a historic apartment building at 300 West 13th Avenue in Pine Bluff, Arkansas. It is a two-story masonry structure, built out of buff brick. It is a U-shaped building, with Classical Revival features, including a projecting cornice and a crenellated parapet at the center of the U. Built in about 1925, this twelve-unit building was then the largest apartment building in the state in terms of total square footage. Parkview Apartments was the work of O.C. Hauber, a businessman who played a major role in the growth and development of Pine Bluff in the early 20th century.

The property was listed on the National Register of Historic Places in 1989.

== See also ==
- National Register of Historic Places listings in Jefferson County, Arkansas
