= Prigmore House =

Historic house in Arkansas, United States

- U.S. National Register of Historic Places
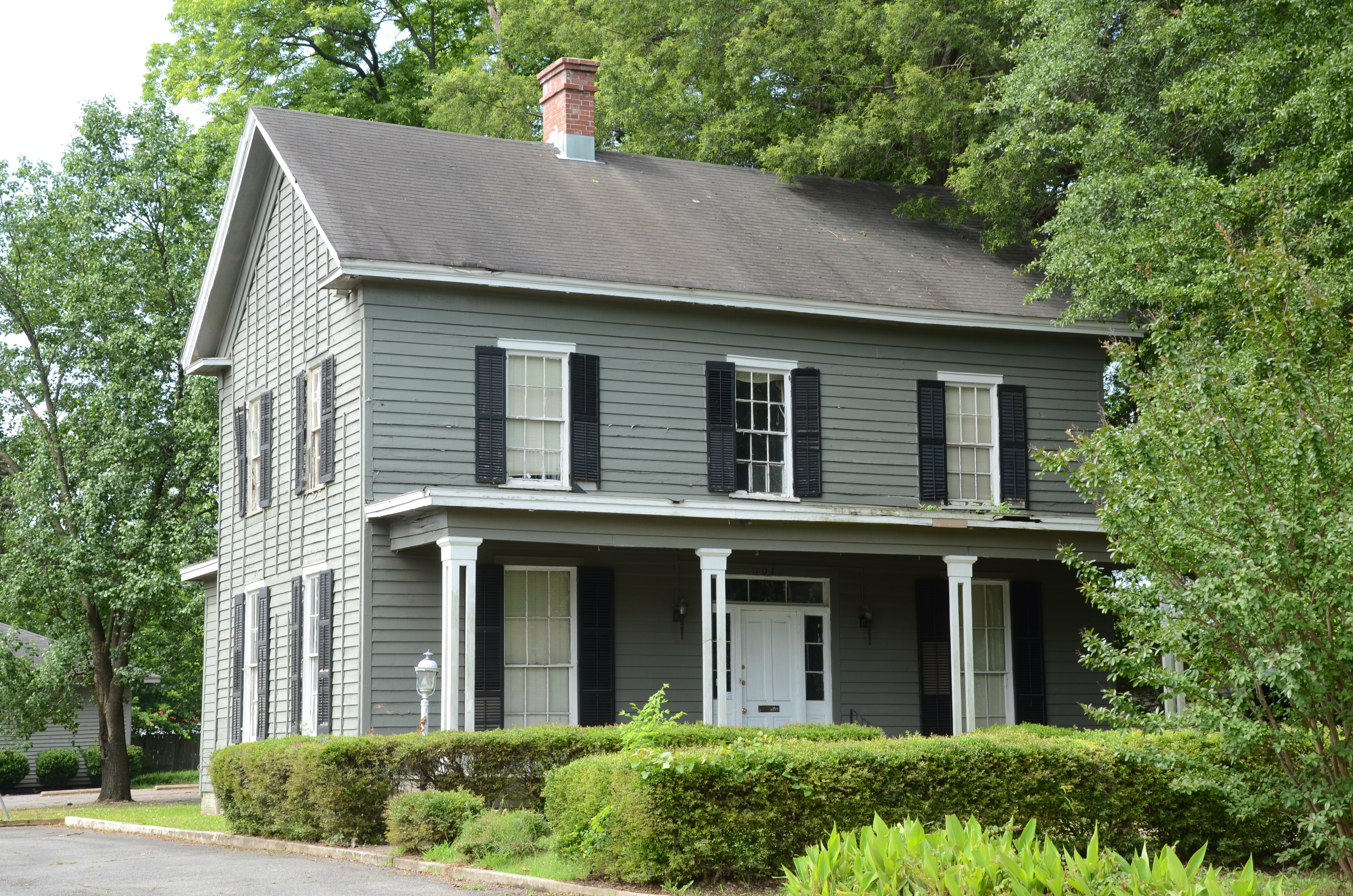

- Location within Arkansas Location within the United States
- Location: 1104 W. Fifth Ave., Pine Bluff, Arkansas
- Coordinates: 34°13′29″N 92°0′38″W
- Area: less than one acre
- Built: 1873
- Built by: George W. Prigmore
- Architectural style: I-house
- NRHP reference No.: 86000720
- Added to NRHP: April 10, 1986

The Prigmore House is a historic house at 1104 West Fifth Avenue in Pine Bluff, Arkansas. It is a two-story wood-frame structure, with a gable roof, weatherboard siding, and a high brick foundation. A single-story gabled ell extends to the rear. A single-story porch extends across the front facade, supported by grouped columns. The house was built about 1873 by George Prigmore, a veteran of the American Civil War, and is a rare surviving property in Pine Bluff from that period.

The house was listed on the National Register of Historic Places in 1986.

== See also ==
- National Register of Historic Places listings in Jefferson County, Arkansas
