= Bechle Apartment Building =

Historic residential building in Arkansas, United States

- U.S. National Register of Historic Places
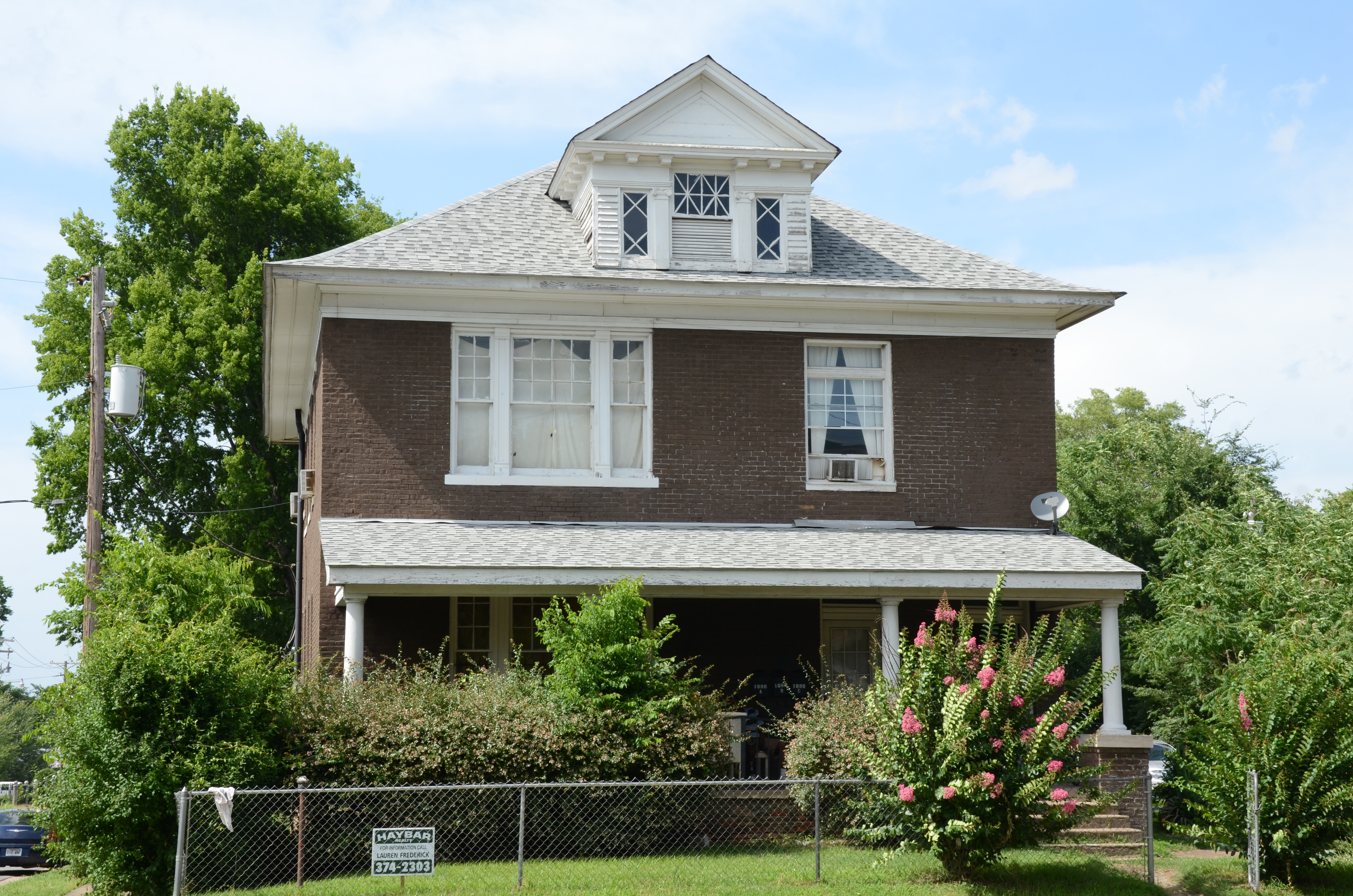

- Location within Arkansas Location within the United States
- Location: 1000 E. 9th St., Little Rock, Arkansas
- Coordinates: 34°44′23″N 92°15′34″W
- Area: less than one acre
- Built: 1909
- Architectural style: Colonial Revival
- NRHP reference No.: 78003201
- Added to NRHP: October 2, 1978

The Bechle Apartment Building is a historic two-unit house at 1000 East 9th Street in Little Rock, Arkansas. It is a 2 1/2-story brick structure, with a hip roof pierced by a single hip-roof dormer at its front. The dormer has small windows laid out like a Palladian window, with Stick style decorative elements. A shed roof porch extends across the building front, supported by Tuscan columns mounted on short brick piers. The building was designed by Charles L. Thompson and was built in 1909.

The building was listed on the National Register of Historic Places in 1978.

== See also ==
- National Register of Historic Places listings in Little Rock, Arkansas
