= East Markham Street Historic District =

Historic district in Arkansas, United States

- U.S. National Register of Historic Places
- U.S. Historic district
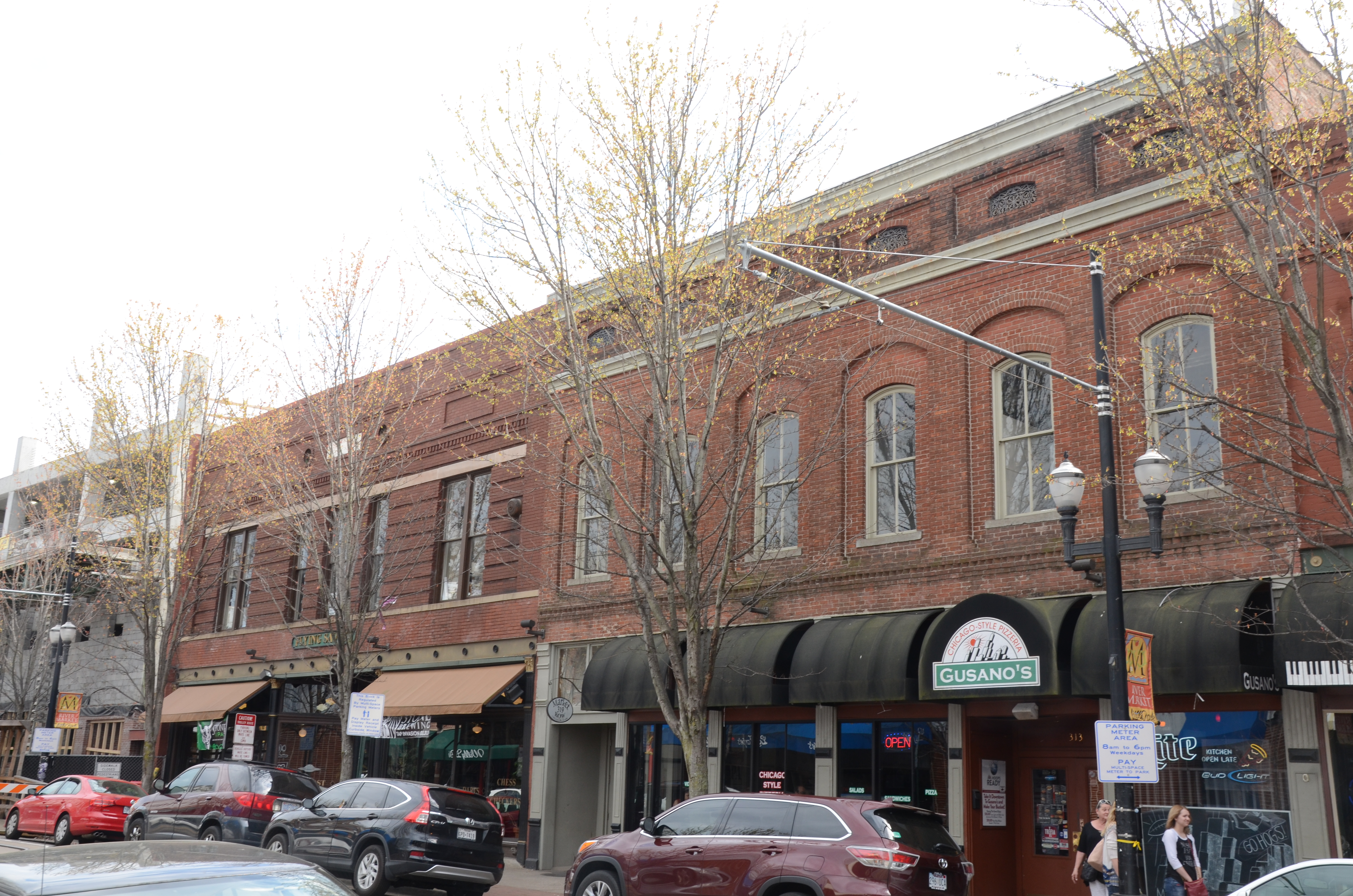

- Location within Arkansas Location within the United States
- Nearest city: Little Rock, Arkansas
- Coordinates: 34°44′50″N 92°16′3″W
- Area: less than one acre
- Built: 1876
- Architect: Multiple, including Charles L. Thompson
- Architectural style: Italianate, Early Commercial
- NRHP reference No.: 99000522
- Added to NRHP: May 5, 1999

The East Markham Street Historic District encompasses a cluster of four architecturally distinctive commercial buildings on the south side of the 300 block of East Markham Street in the riverfront area of Little Rock, Arkansas. All four are brick two-story buildings, and were built between 1876 and 1905. The buildings at 305-307 and 313 E. Markham are Italianate in style, while 301-303 exhibits Craftsman styling due to a renovation overseen by Charles L. Thompson in 1916, and 323 was also restyled by Thompson in 1905.

The district was listed on the National Register of Historic Places in 1999.

== See also ==
- National Register of Historic Places listings in Little Rock, Arkansas
