= Gracie House =

Historic house in Arkansas, United States

- Formerly listed on the U.S. National Register of Historic Places
- Location within Arkansas Location within the United States
- Location: Off AR 88, New Gascony, Arkansas
- Coordinates: 34°13′36″N 91°46′33″W
- Area: less than one acre
- Built: 1915
- Architect: Thompson and Harding
- Architectural style: Bungalow/American Craftsman
- MPS: Thompson, Charles L., Design Collection TR
- NRHP reference No.: 82000846

Significant dates
- Added to NRHP: December 22, 1982
- Removed from NRHP: February 1, 2019

The Gracie House is a historic house in New Gascony, Arkansas. It is located in an agricultural setting south of Arkansas Highway 88, on land that made up what was once Arkansas's largest cotton plantation. It is a modest 1 1/2-story wood-frame structure, with a wide gable roof and weatherboard siding. A gable section projects at the right side of the front, with a porch extending across the remainder of the front, recessed under the main roof and supported by Tuscan columns. A broad gabled dormer pierces the roof above the porch. The house was built in 1915, and was designed by architects Thompson and Harding as an American Craftsman-influenced bungalow. It was listed on the National Register of Historic Places in 1982.

== See also ==
- National Register of Historic Places listings in Jefferson County, Arkansas
