= Deener House =

Historic house in Arkansas, United States

- U.S. National Register of Historic Places
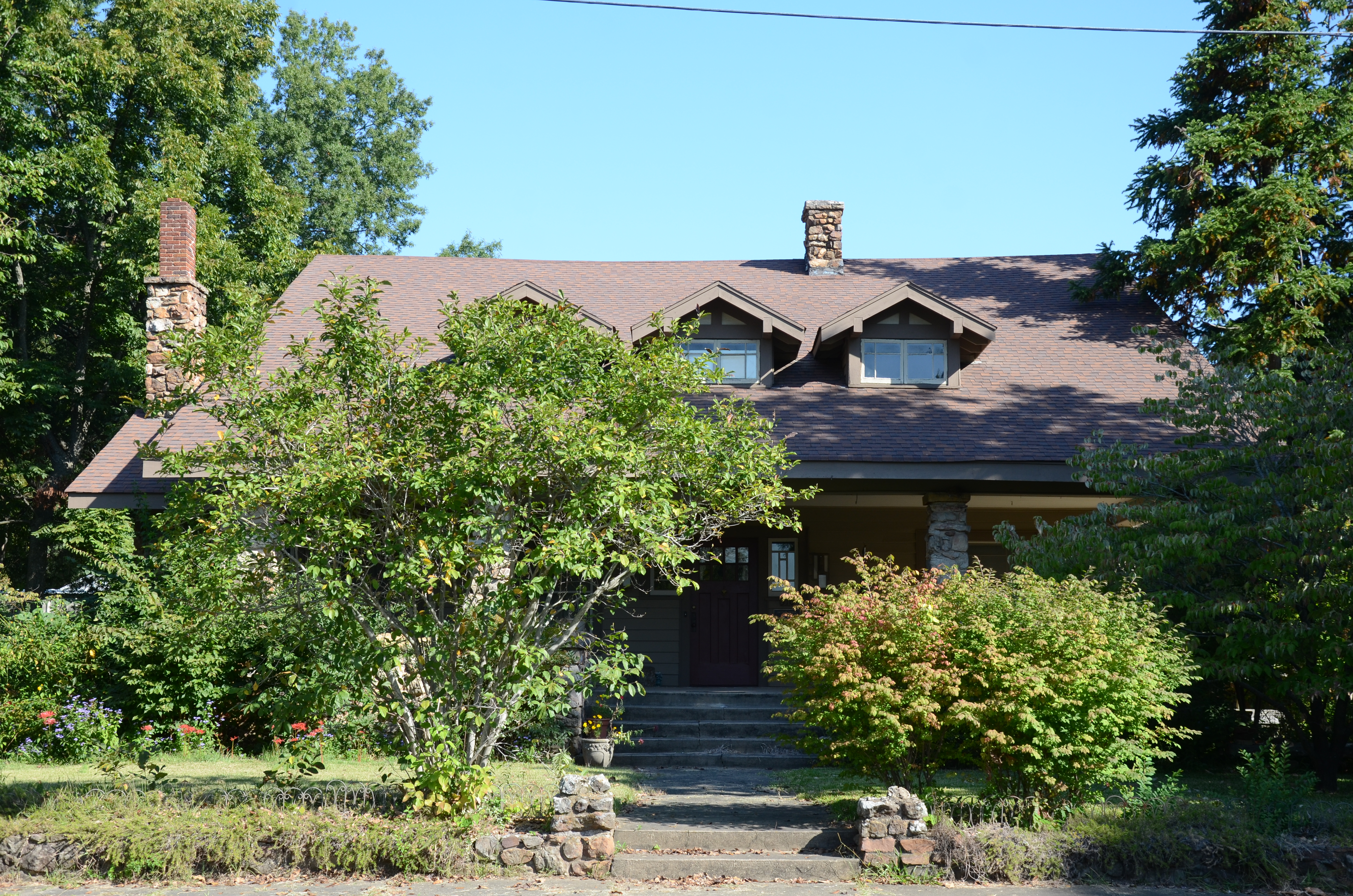

- Location within Arkansas Location within the United States
- Location: 310 E. Center Ave., Searcy, Arkansas
- Coordinates: 35°14′54″N 91°43′57″W
- Area: less than one acre
- Built: 1912
- Architect: Charles L. Thompson
- Architectural style: Bungalow/Craftsman
- MPS: Thompson, Charles L., Design Collection TR
- NRHP reference No.: 82000957
- Added to NRHP: December 22, 1982

The Deener House is a historic house at 310 East Center Street in Searcy, Arkansas. It is a 1 1/2-story Bungalow/Craftsman style house that was designed by noted Arkansas architect Charles L. Thompson and built in 1912. It has the low-slung appearance typical of the Bungalow style, with a side gable roof that extends across its full-width front porch, where it is supported by fieldstone piers, and shows exposed rafters. Three small gable-roof dormers are closely spaced near the center of the otherwise expansive roof.

The house was listed on the National Register of Historic Places in 1982. The Hicks-Dugan-Deener House, next door at 306 E. Center Street, is also listed.

== See also ==
- National Register of Historic Places listings in White County, Arkansas
