= Russell House (Pine Bluff, Arkansas) =

Historic house in Arkansas, United States

- Formerly listed on the U.S. National Register of Historic Places
- Location within Arkansas Location within the United States
- Location: 1617 S. Olive St., Pine Bluff, Arkansas
- Coordinates: 34°12′44″N 92°0′24″W
- Built: 1912
- Architect: Charles L. Thompson
- Architectural style: Bungalow/Craftsman
- MPS: Thompson, Charles L., Design Collection TR
- NRHP reference No.: 82000852

Significant dates
- Added to NRHP: December 22, 1982
- Removed from NRHP: September 20, 2006

Russell House in Pine Bluff, Arkansas was built in 1912. It was listed on the National Register of Historic Places in 1982. It was delisted from the National Register in 2006.
