= Interstate Orphanage =

- U.S. National Register of Historic Places
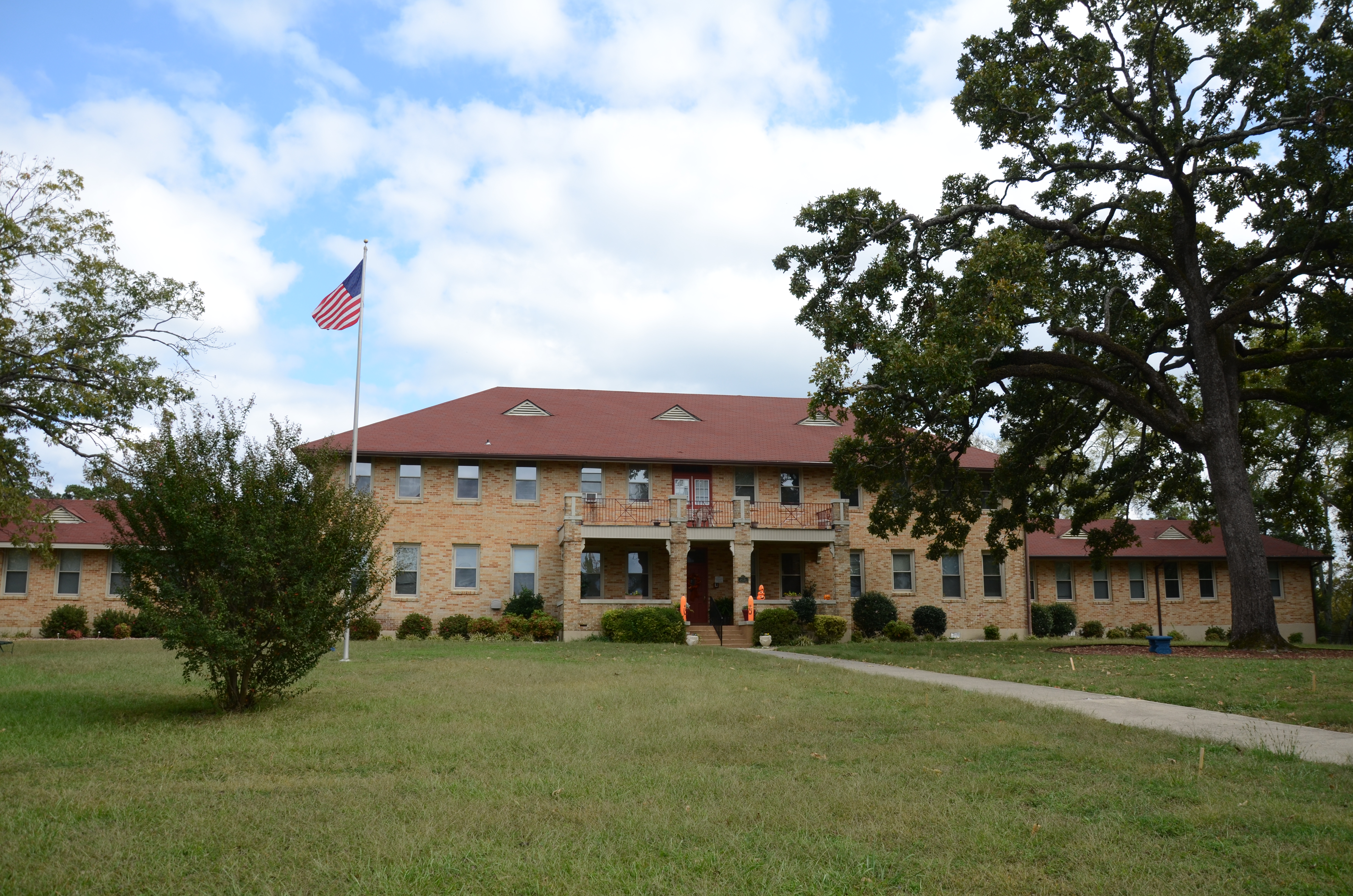

- Location within Arkansas Location within the United States
- Location: 339 Charteroak Street, Hot Springs, Arkansas 71901-6100
- Coordinates: 34°29′50″N 93°3′12″W
- Area: 9.4 acres (3.8 ha)
- Built: 1928
- Architect: Charles L. Thompson
- Architectural style: Bungalow/craftsman
- MPS: Thompson, Charles L., Design Collection TR
- NRHP reference No.: 82000832
- Added to NRHP: December 22, 1982

The Interstate Orphanage was a historic orphanage at 339 Charteroak Street (formerly 339 Combs) in Hot Springs, Arkansas. The building in which it was located is a two-story brick building with a hip roof that has broad eaves, and single-story flanking wings. A porch extends across five bays of the front, with a brick balustrade and brick posts. The building was designed by Charles L. Thompson and built in 1928.

The building was listed on the National Register of Historic Places in 1982. It continues to be used as an orphanage, and is now owned by the Ouachita Children's Center.

== See also ==
- National Register of Historic Places listings in Garland County, Arkansas
