= Roselawn Memorial Park Gatehouse =

- U.S. National Register of Historic Places
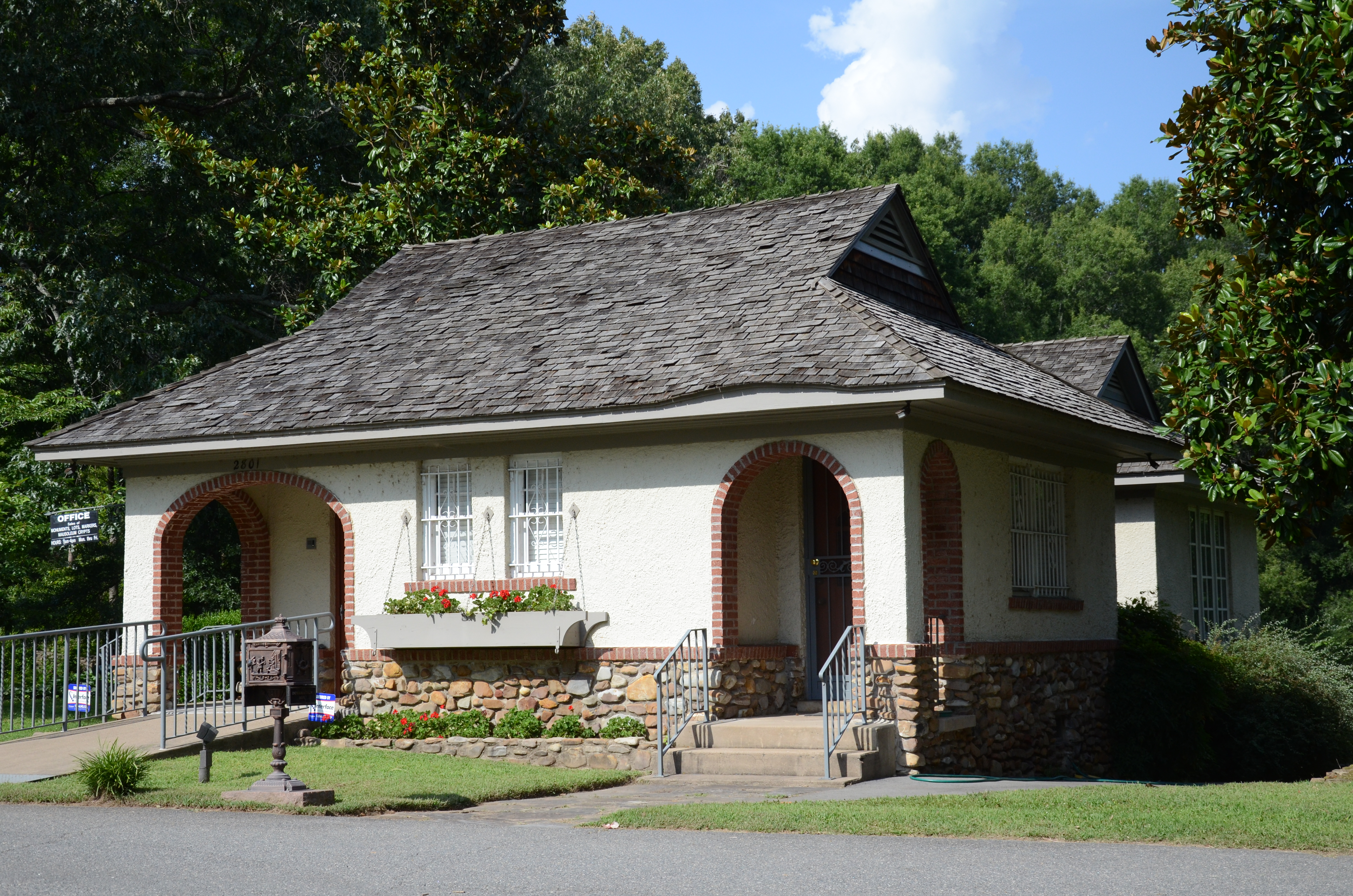

- Location within Arkansas Location within the United States
- Location: 2801 Asher Ave., Little Rock, Arkansas
- Coordinates: 34°43′51″N 92°18′16″W
- Area: less than one acre
- Built: 1924
- Architect: Charles L. Thompson (Thompson & Harding)
- Architectural style: Colonial Revival, Mission Revival/Spanish Revival
- MPS: Thompson, Charles L., Design Collection TR
- NRHP reference No.: 82000923
- Added to NRHP: December 22, 1982

The Roselawn Memorial Park Gatehouse is a historic cemetery office building in Roselawn Memorial Park, a large public cemetery at 2801 Asher Avenue in Little Rock, Arkansas. It stands just inside and to the left of the main gate. It is a single story building, with a gable-on-hip roof, stuccoed walls, and a foundation whose exterior is finished in rough cobblestone. At either end of its main facade are two arches, lined with red brick, providing access to the recessed building entrances. Similar arches on the side walls give the recess a porch-like feel. The building was designed by Thompson and Harding, and built in 1924. It is the only known gatehouse design of firms associated with Arkansas architect Charles L. Thompson.

The building was listed on the National Register of Historic Places in 1982.

== See also ==
- National Register of Historic Places listings in Little Rock, Arkansas
