= Puddephatt House =

Historic house in Arkansas, United States

- U.S. National Register of Historic Places
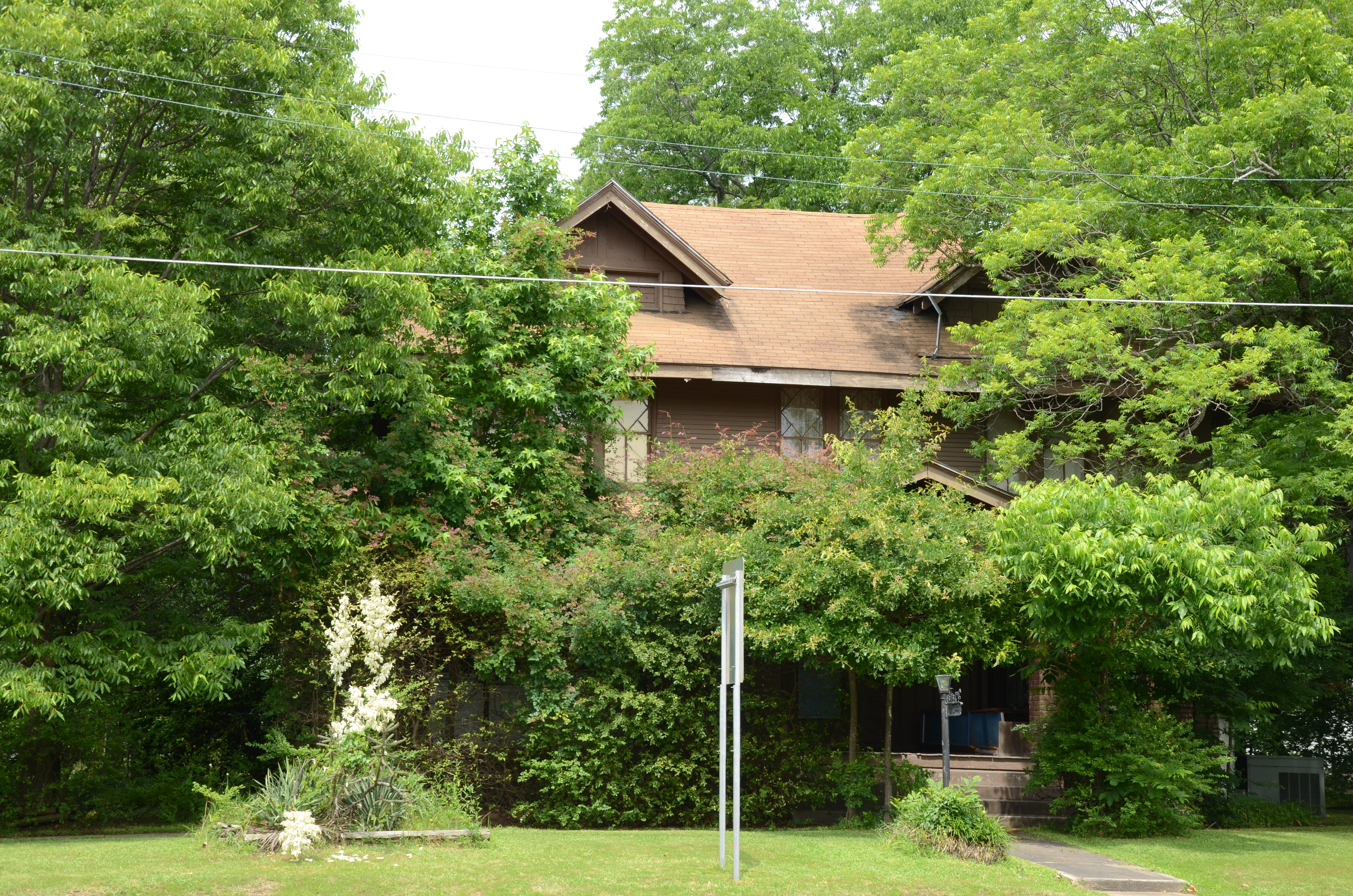

- Location within Arkansas Location within the United States
- Location: 1820 S. Olive St., Pine Bluff, Arkansas
- Coordinates: 34°12′37″N 92°0′26″W
- Area: less than one acre
- Built: 1911
- Architect: Charles L. Thompson
- Architectural style: Bungalow/American Craftsman
- MPS: Thompson, Charles L., Design Collection TR
- NRHP reference No.: 82000851
- Added to NRHP: December 22, 1982

The Puddephatt House is a historic house at 1820 South Olive Street in Pine Bluff, Arkansas. It is a two-story American Foursquare structure with American Craftsman styling, designed by Charles L. Thompson and built about 1911. Instead of the more typical Colonial Revival styling found in this type of house, the front porch has Craftsman-style square brick posts, and the roof has dormers with false half-timbering.

The house was listed on the National Register of Historic Places in 1982.

== See also ==
- National Register of Historic Places listings in Jefferson County, Arkansas
