= Nichol House =

Historic house in Arkansas, United States

- U.S. National Register of Historic Places
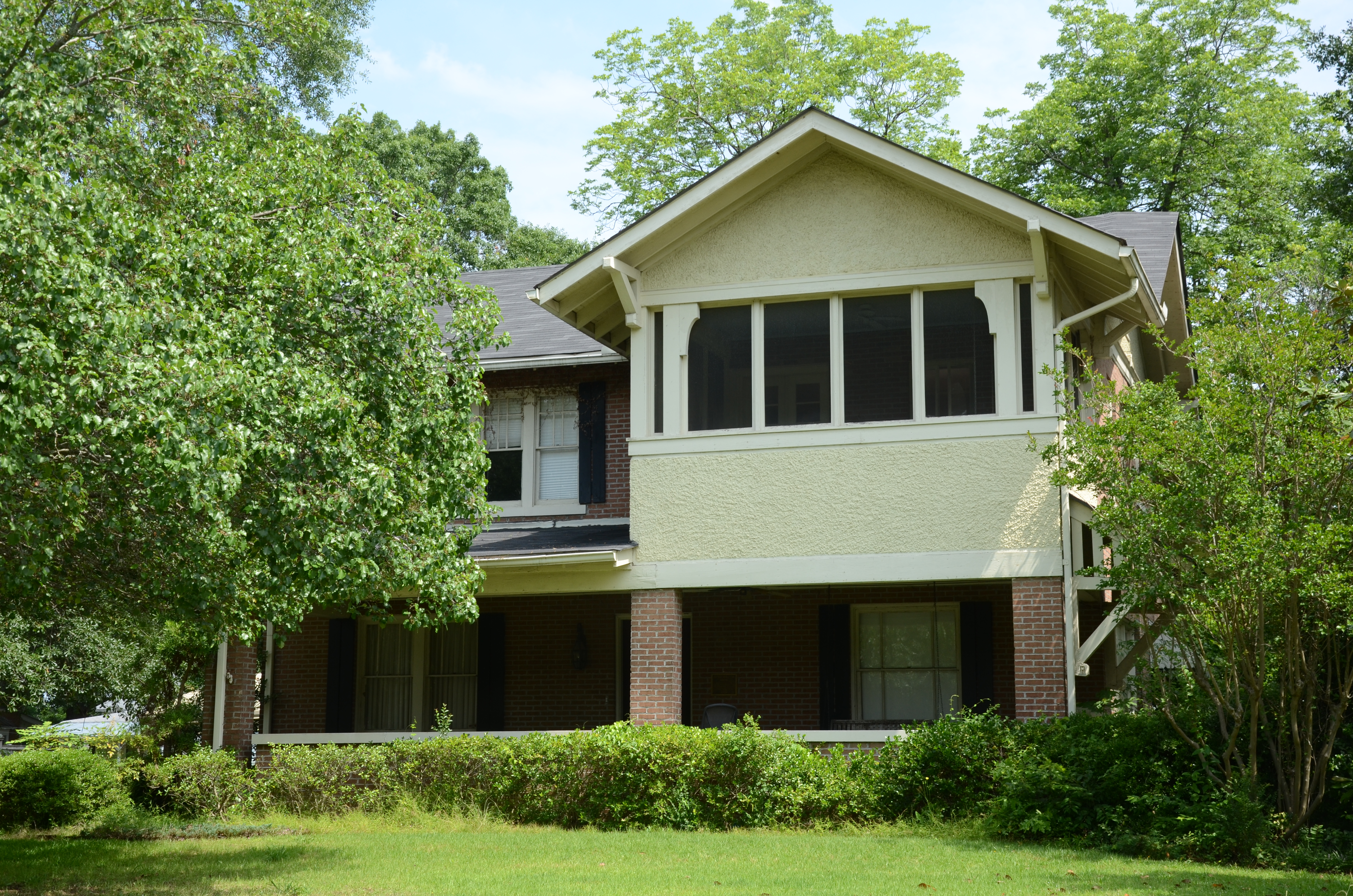

- Location within Arkansas Location within the United States
- Location: 205 Park Pl., Pine Bluff, Arkansas
- Coordinates: 34°12′39″N 92°0′2″W
- Area: less than one acre
- Built: 1916
- Architect: Charles L. Thompson, McDaniel & Brassell
- Architectural style: Bungalow/craftsman, Prairie School
- MPS: Thompson, Charles L., Design Collection TR
- NRHP reference No.: 93001201
- Added to NRHP: November 12, 1993

The Nichol House is a historic house at 205 Park Place in Pine Bluff, Arkansas. It is a two-story wood-frame structure, with its exterior finished in a combination of brick veneer and stucco. A single-story shed-roofed porch extends across the front, supported by brick piers, with a second-story enclosed porch above the right side. Gable ends feature large Craftsman brackets and exposed rafter ends. The house was designed by Charles L. Thompson and was built in 1916 for a local banker.

The house was listed on the National Register of Historic Places in 1993.

== See also ==
- National Register of Historic Places listings in Jefferson County, Arkansas
