= Ida Hicks House =

Historic house in Arkansas, United States

- Formerly listed on the U.S. National Register of Historic Places
- Location within Arkansas Location within the United States
- Location: 410 W. Arch St., Searcy, Arkansas
- Coordinates: 35°15′1″N 91°44′29″W
- Area: less than one acre
- Built: 1913
- Architect: Charles L. Thompson
- Architectural style: Craftsman
- MPS: White County MPS
- NRHP reference No.: 91001180

Significant dates
- Added to NRHP: September 5, 1991
- Removed from NRHP: January 26, 2018

The Ida Hicks House was a historic house at 410 West Arch Street in Searcy, Arkansas. It was a two-story wood-frame structure with Craftsman styling, built in 1913 to a design by the noted Arkansas architect Charles L. Thompson. It had a basically rectangular plan, but this was obscured by a variety of projections and porches. A single-story porch extended across the south-facing front, supported by brick piers, and with exposed rafters under the roof. The second floor had three groups of windows: the outer ones were three-part sash windows, while in the center there were two casement windows.

The house was listed on the National Register of Historic Places in 1991. It has been listed as destroyed in the Arkansas Historic Preservation Program database, and was delisted in 2018.

== See also ==
- National Register of Historic Places listings in White County, Arkansas
