= Hudson House (Pine Bluff, Arkansas) =

Historic house in Arkansas, United States

- U.S. National Register of Historic Places
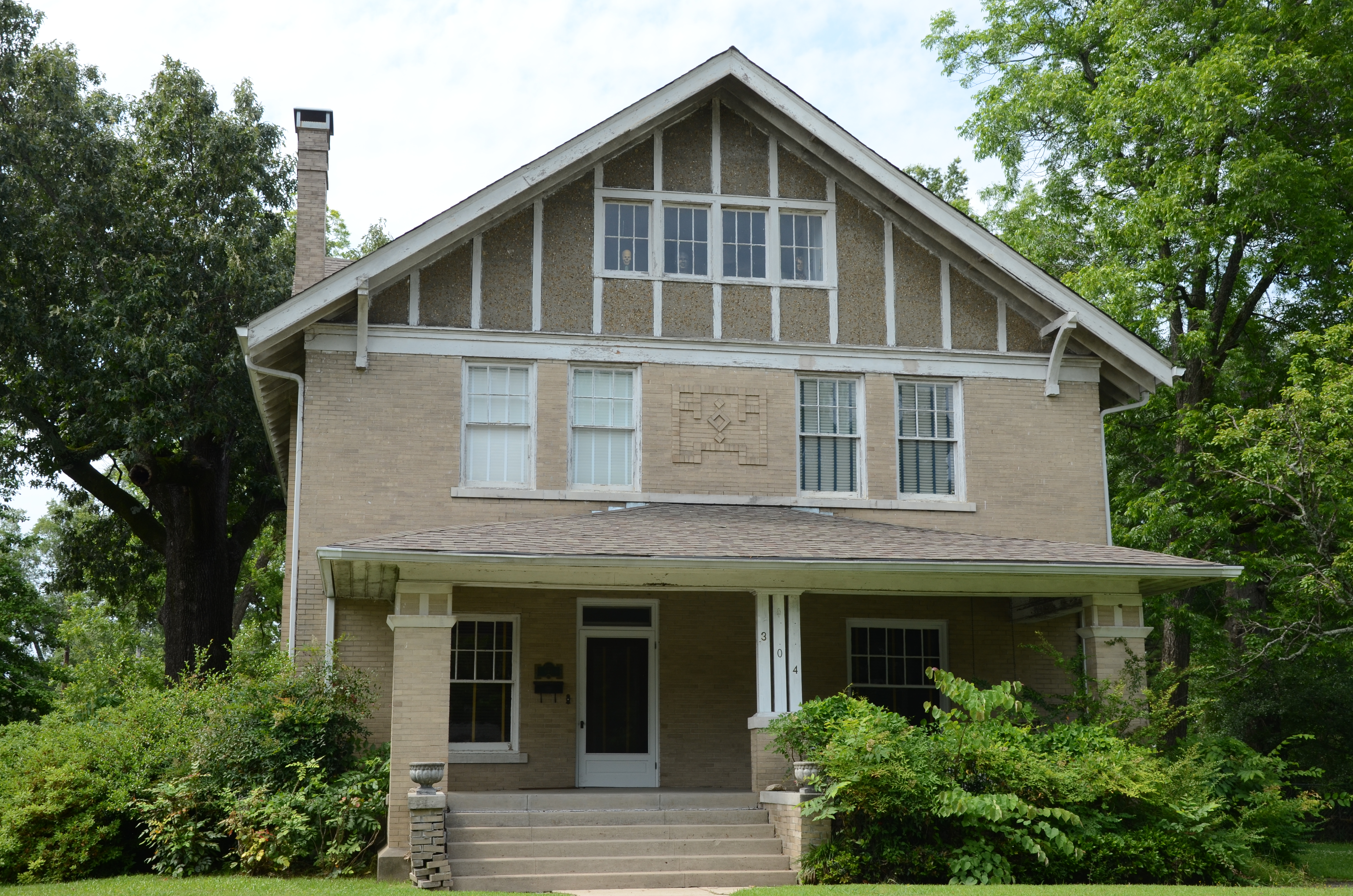

- Location within Arkansas Location within the United States
- Location: 304 W. 15th St., Pine Bluff, Arkansas
- Coordinates: 34°12′51″N 92°0′20″W
- Area: less than one acre
- Built: 1911
- Architect: Charles L. Thompson
- Architectural style: Bungalow/American Craftsman
- MPS: Thompson, Charles L., Design Collection TR
- NRHP reference No.: 82000848
- Added to NRHP: December 22, 1982

The Hudson House is a historic house at 304 West 15th Street in Pine Bluff, Arkansas, USA. It is a 2-½ story structure, faced with brick on the main floors, and with half-timbered stucco in the front-facing gable. which is further accentuated by large brackets. A single-story hip-roofed porch extends across the front, supported by brick piers. The house was designed by Charles L. Thompson and was built in 1911. It is a high-quality local example of Craftsman architecture.

The house was listed on the National Register of Historic Places in 1982.

== See also ==
- National Register of Historic Places listings in Jefferson County, Arkansas
