= Little Rock Boys Club =

- U.S. National Register of Historic Places
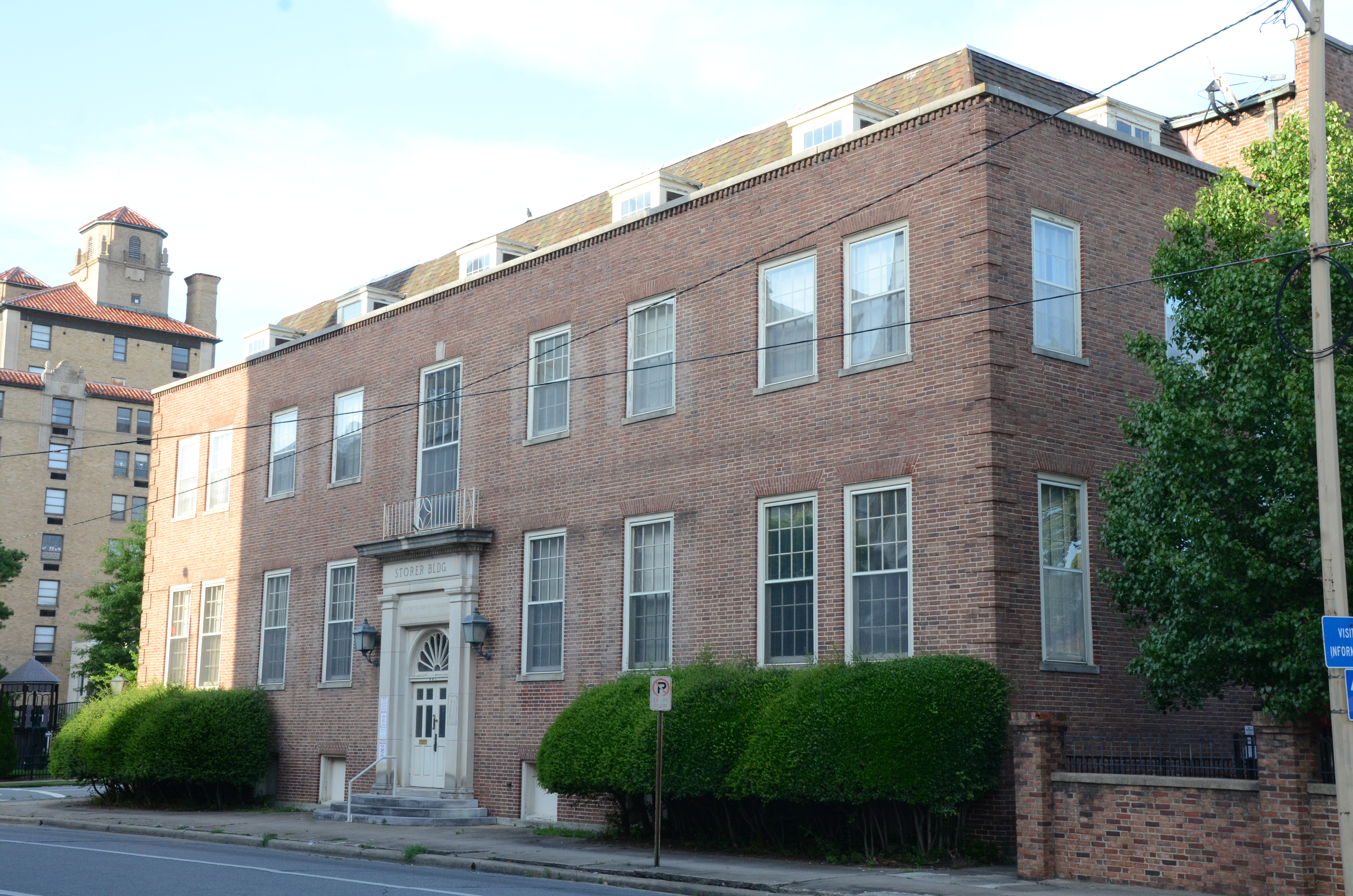

- Location within Arkansas Location within the United States
- Location: 8th & Scott Sts., Little Rock, Arkansas
- Coordinates: 34°44′26″N 92°16′12″W
- Area: less than one acre
- Built: 1930
- Architect: Thompson, Sanders and Ginocchio
- Architectural style: Colonial Revival
- MPS: Thompson, Charles L., Design Collection TR
- NRHP reference No.: 82000906
- Added to NRHP: December 22, 1982

The Little Rock Boys Club, now the Storer Building, is a historic commercial building at 8th and Scott Streets in downtown Little Rock, Arkansas. It is a two-story brick Colonial Revival building, with a third floor under a recessed mansard roof with gabled dormers. The brick is laid in Flemish bond, and the main entrance is framed by stone pilasters and topped by a fanlight window and entablature. The building was designed by Thompson, Sanders and Ginocchio, and was built in 1930. It now houses professional offices.

The building was listed on the National Register of Historic Places in 1982.

== See also ==
- National Register of Historic Places listings in Little Rock, Arkansas
