= Johnson House (Pine Bluff, Arkansas) =

Historic house in Arkansas, United States

- U.S. National Register of Historic Places
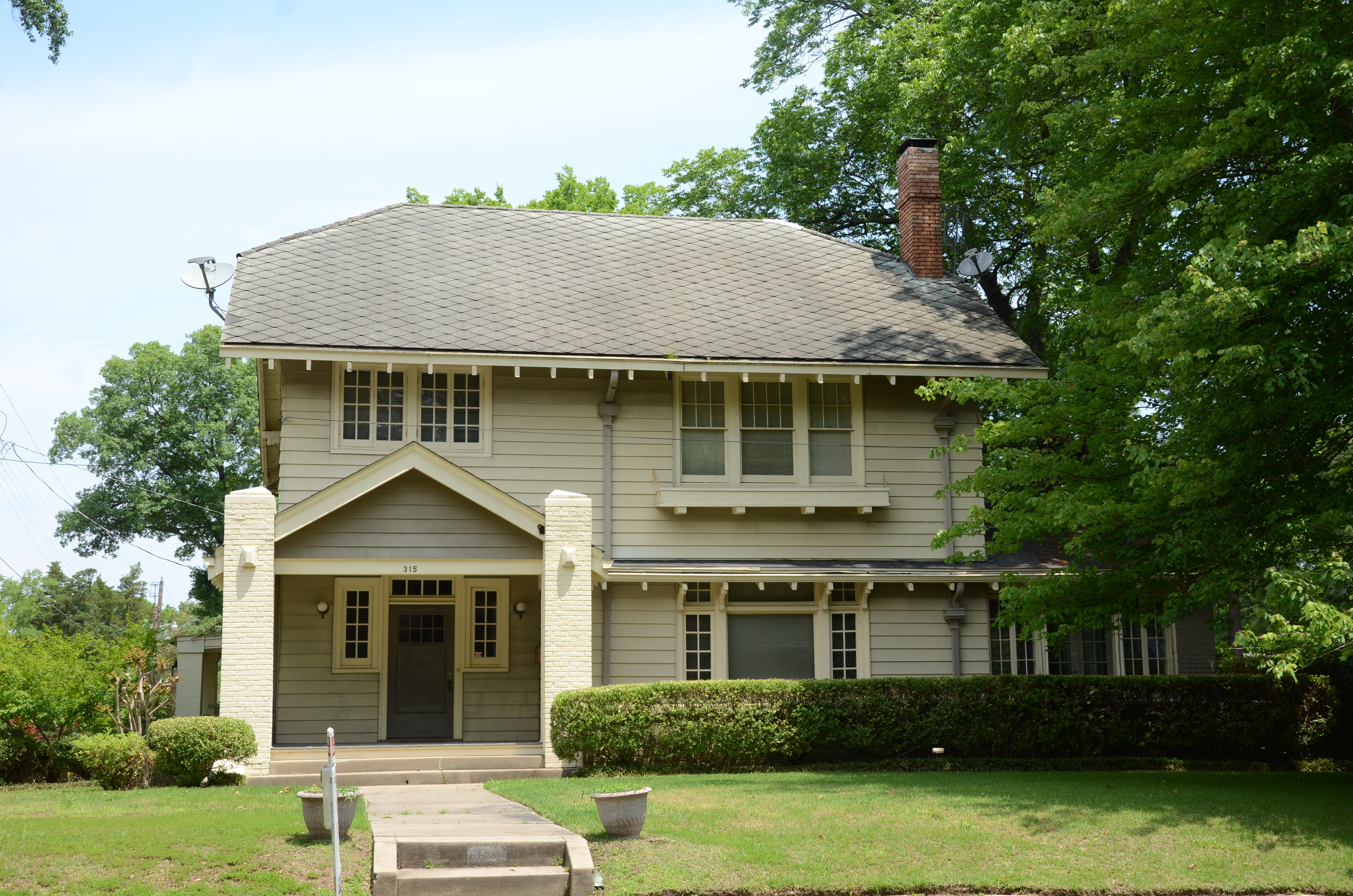

- Location within Arkansas Location within the United States
- Location: 315 Martin St., Pine Bluff, Arkansas
- Coordinates: 34°13′6″N 92°0′21″W
- Area: less than one acre
- Built: 1912
- Architect: Charles L. Thompson
- Architectural style: Bungalow/American craftsman
- MPS: Thompson, Charles L., Design Collection TR
- NRHP reference No.: 82000849
- Added to NRHP: December 22, 1982

The Johnson House is a historic house at 315 Martin Street in Pine Bluff, Arkansas, United States. It is a two-story wood-frame structure, with a side-gable roof with clipped ends, and overhanging eaves with exposed rafter ends. A gabled porch projects from the left front, supported by brick piers. The entrance is framed by sidelight and transom windows. The house was designed in 1912 by the architectural firm of Charles L. Thompson.

The house was listed on the National Register of Historic Places in 1982.

== See also ==
- National Register of Historic Places listings in Jefferson County, Arkansas
