= Fletcher House (Little Rock, Arkansas) =

Historic house in Arkansas, United States

- U.S. National Register of Historic Places
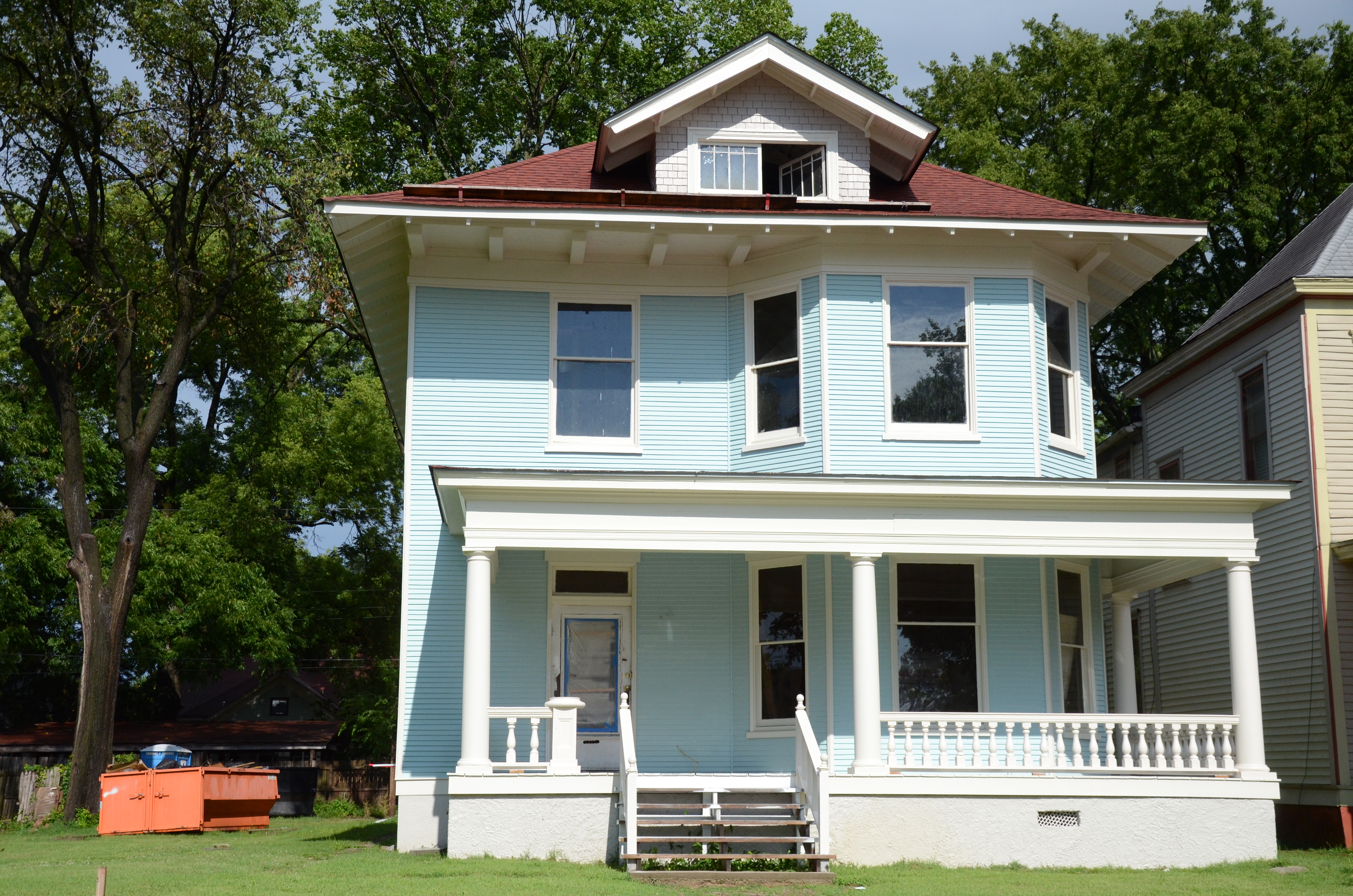

- Location within Arkansas Location within the United States
- Location: 909 Cumberland St., Little Rock, Arkansas
- Coordinates: 34°44′21″N 92°16′8″W
- Area: less than one acre
- Built: 1900
- Architect: Charles L. Thompson
- Architectural style: Colonial Revival
- MPS: Thompson, Charles L., Design Collection TR
- NRHP reference No.: 82000890
- Added to NRHP: December 22, 1982

The Fletcher House is a historic house at 909 Cumberland Street in Little Rock, Arkansas. It is a two-story American Foursquare house, with a dormered hip roof, weatherboard siding, and a single-story hip-roofed porch across the front. Built in 1900, it is a well-kept version of a "budget" Foursquare developed by architect Charles L. Thompson. It has simple Colonial Revival style features, including the porch columns and balustrade.

The house was listed on the National Register of Historic Places in 1982.

== See also ==
- National Register of Historic Places listings in Little Rock, Arkansas
