= White House (Helena, Arkansas) =

Historic house in Arkansas, United States

- U.S. National Register of Historic Places
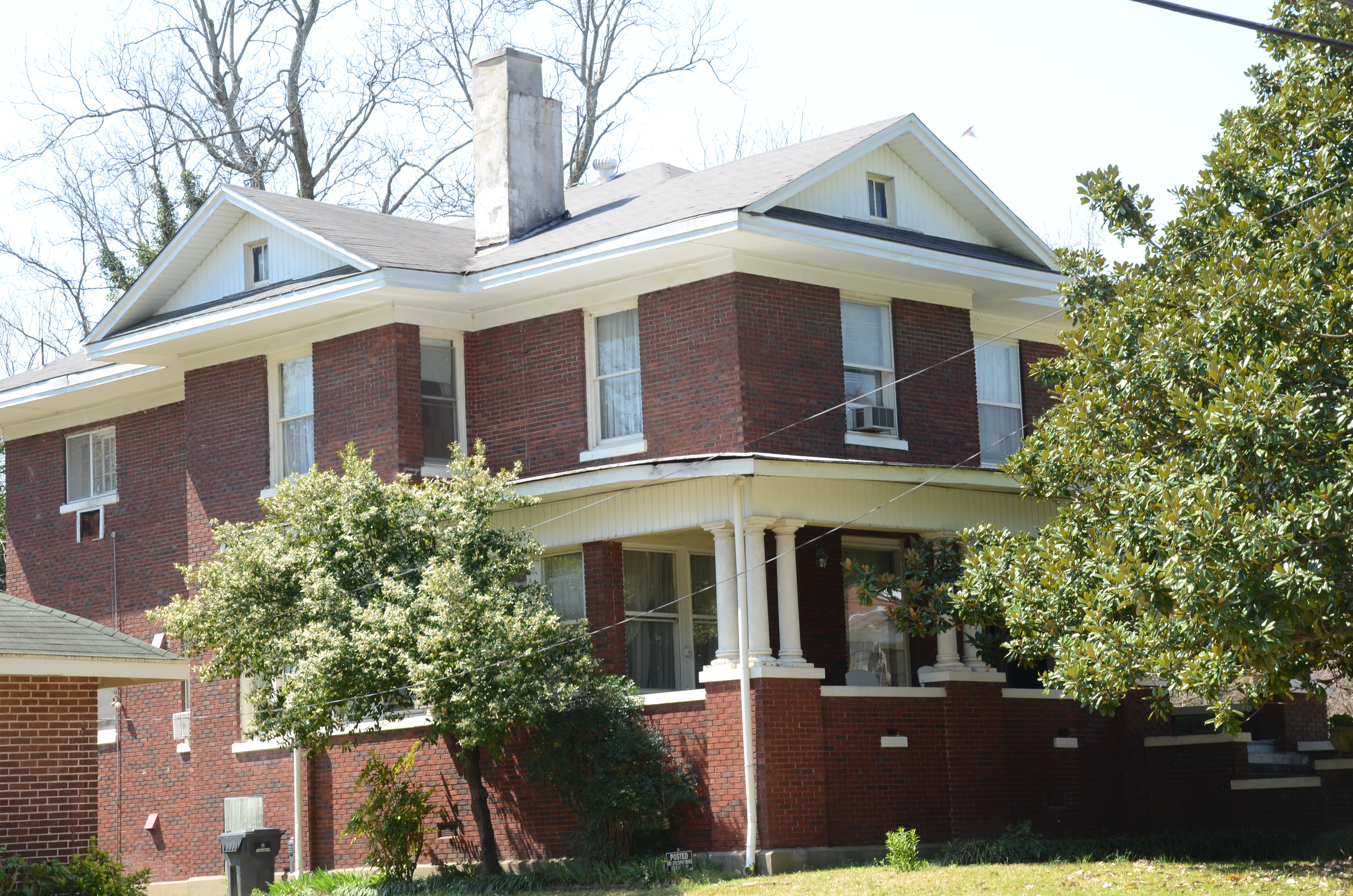

- Location within Arkansas Location within the United States
- Location: 1101 Perry St., Helena, Arkansas
- Coordinates: 34°31′57″N 90°35′56″W
- Area: less than one acre
- Built: 1910
- Architect: Charles L. Thompson
- Architectural style: Colonial Revival
- MPS: Thompson, Charles L., Design Collection TR
- NRHP reference No.: 82000871
- Added to NRHP: December 22, 1982

The White House is a historic house at 1101 Perry Street in Helena, Arkansas. It is a two-story brick building, built in 1910 to a design by architect Charles L. Thompson. The Colonial Revival building has a pyramidal roof with projecting gable sections. A single-story porch wraps around two sides of the house, supported by grouped Tuscan columns. The front entry is framed by sidelight windows and pilasters. It is the only surviving Thompson design (of seven known) in Helena.

The house was listed on the National Register of Historic Places in 1982.

== See also ==
- National Register of Historic Places listings in Phillips County, Arkansas
