= Charles L. Thompson and associates =

American architectural group

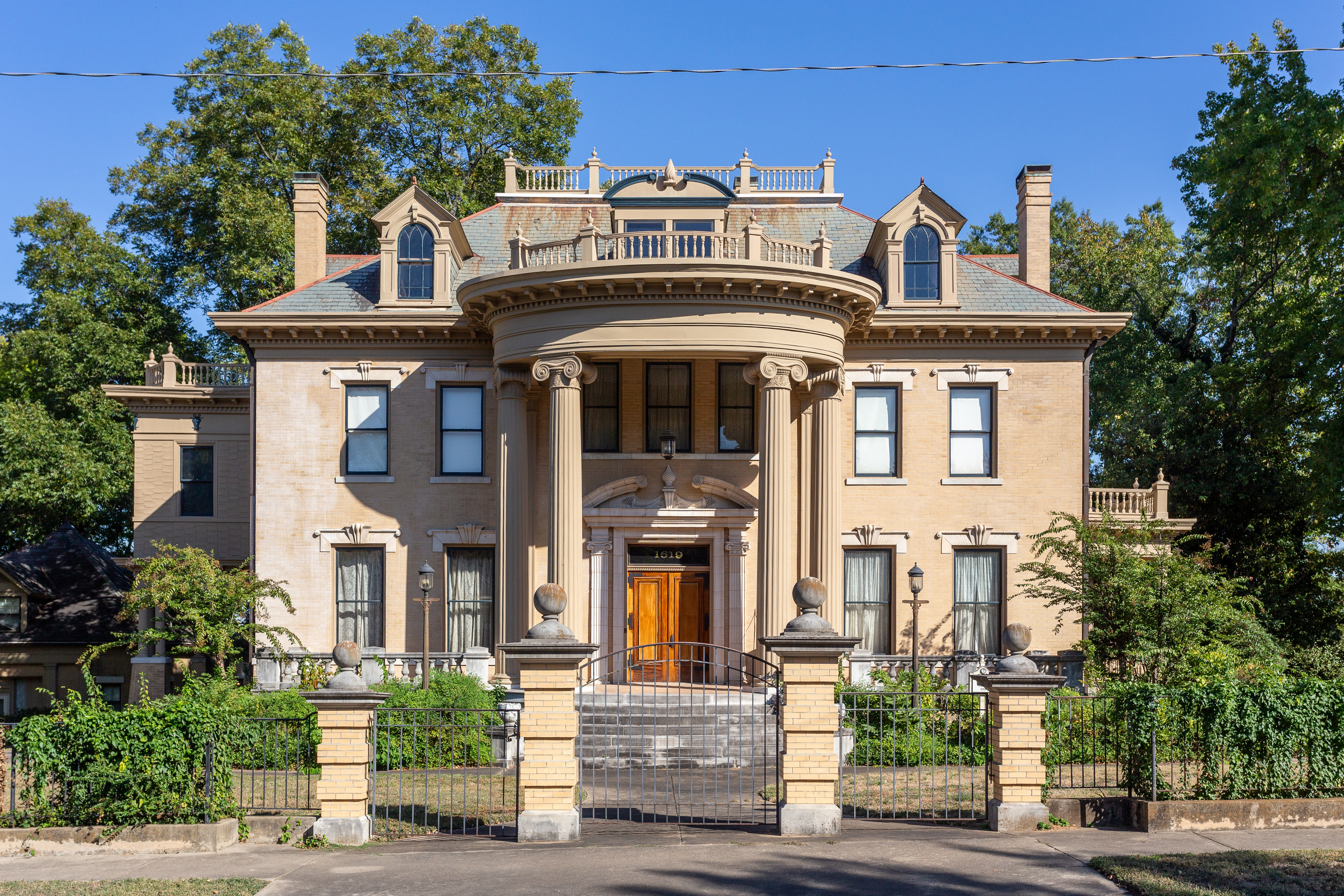
The Hotze House in Little Rock, designed by Thompson and completed in 1900.

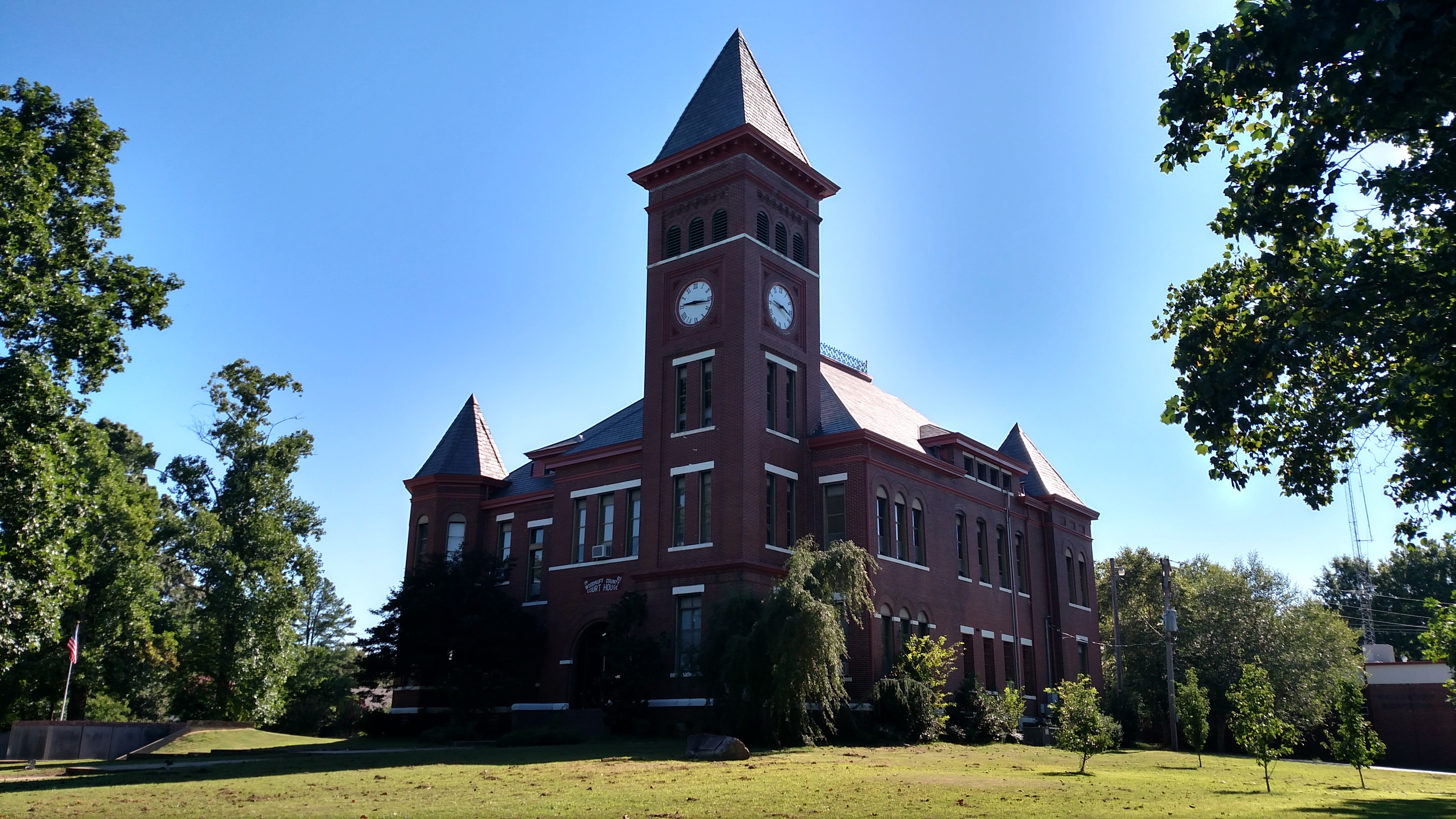
The Woodruff County Courthouse in Augusta, designed by Thompson and completed in 1900.

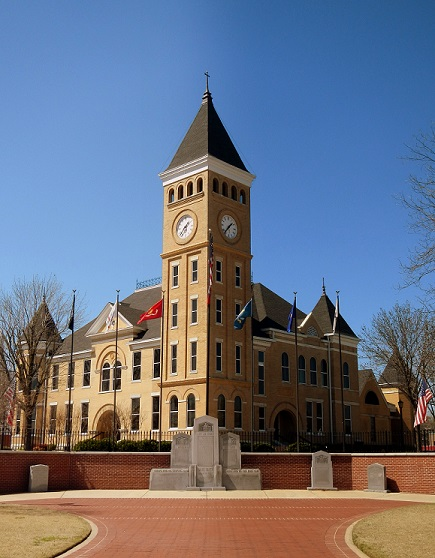
The Saline County Courthouse in Benton, designed by Thompson and completed in 1901.

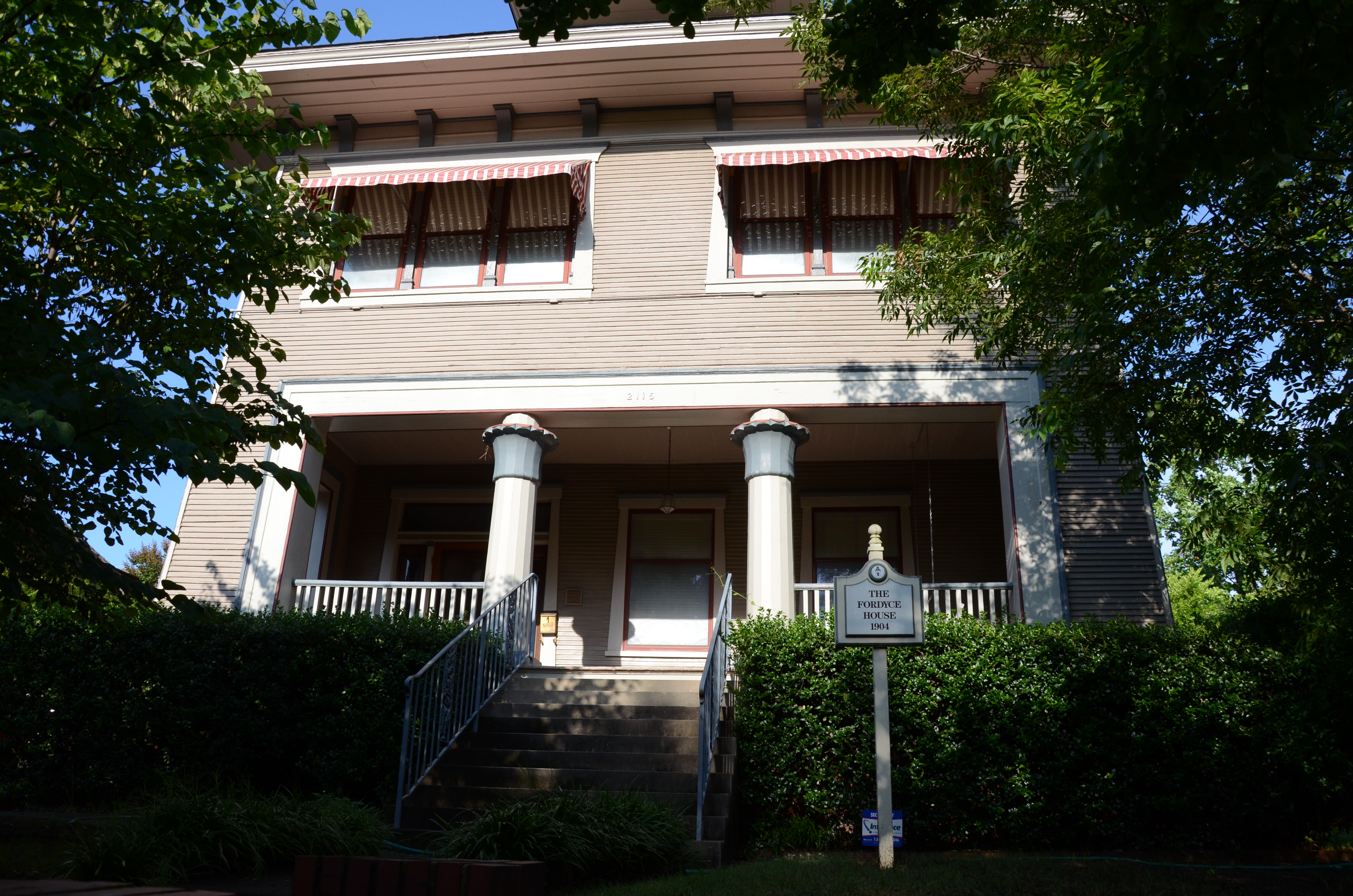
The Fordyce House in Little Rock, designed by Thompson and completed in 1904.

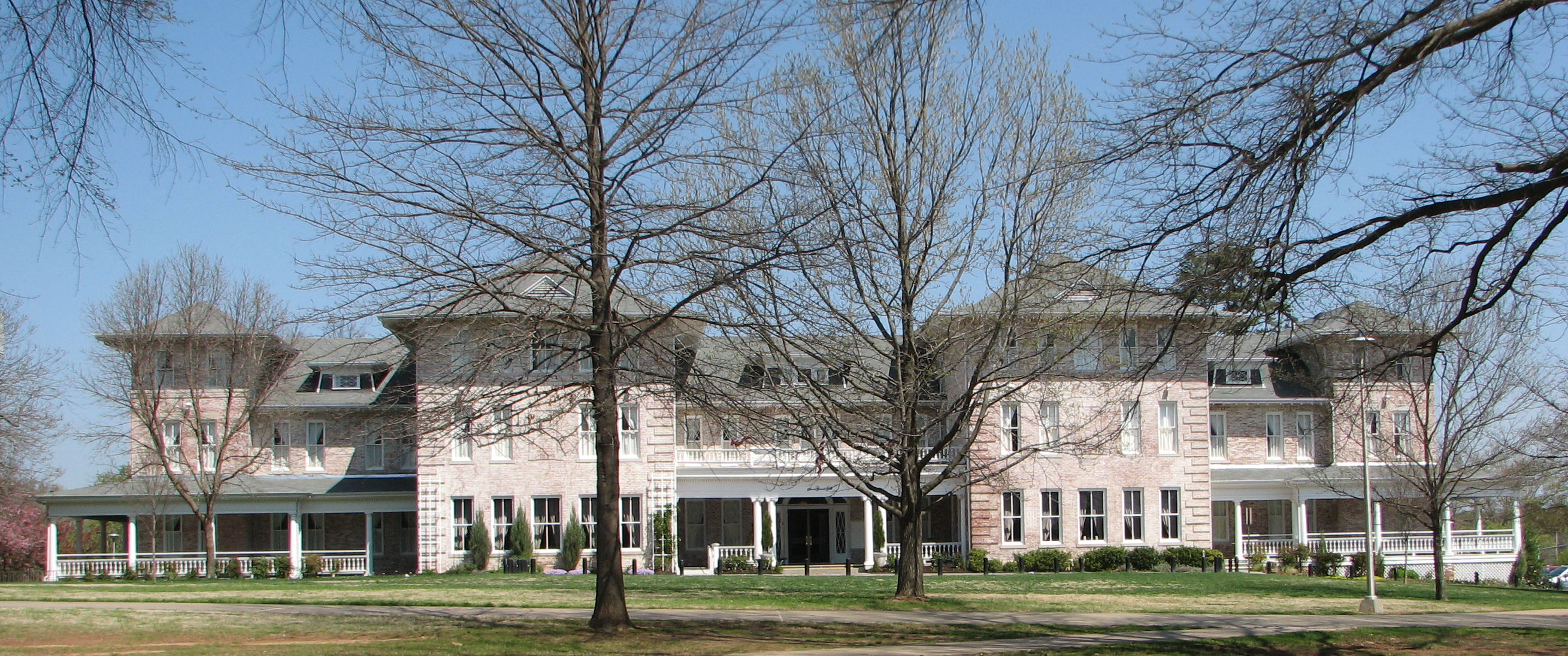
Ella Carnall Hall of the University of Arkansas, designed by Thompson and completed in 1905.

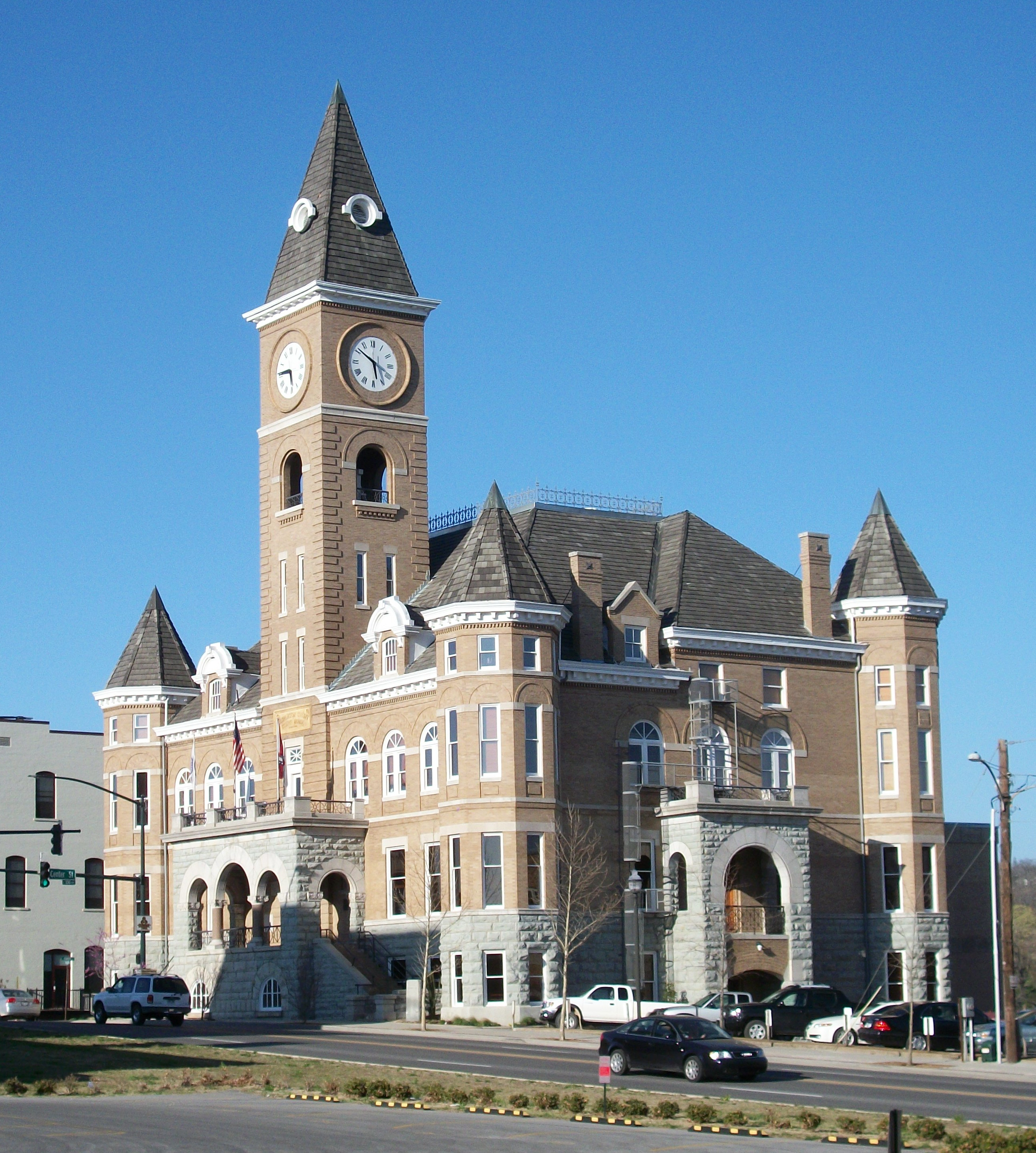
The Washington County Courthouse in Fayetteville, designed by Thompson and completed in 1905.

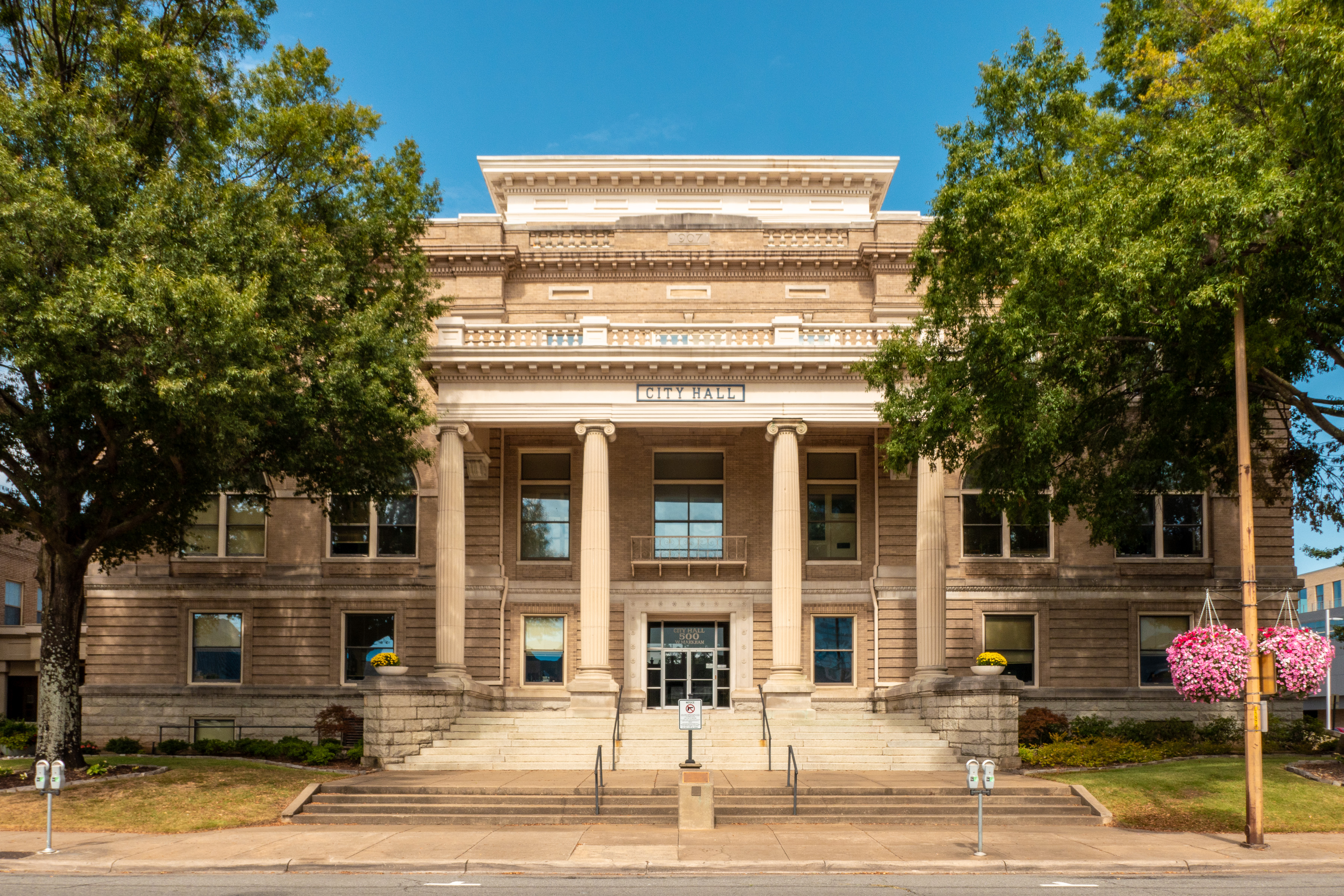
The Little Rock City Hall, designed by Thompson and completed in 1907.

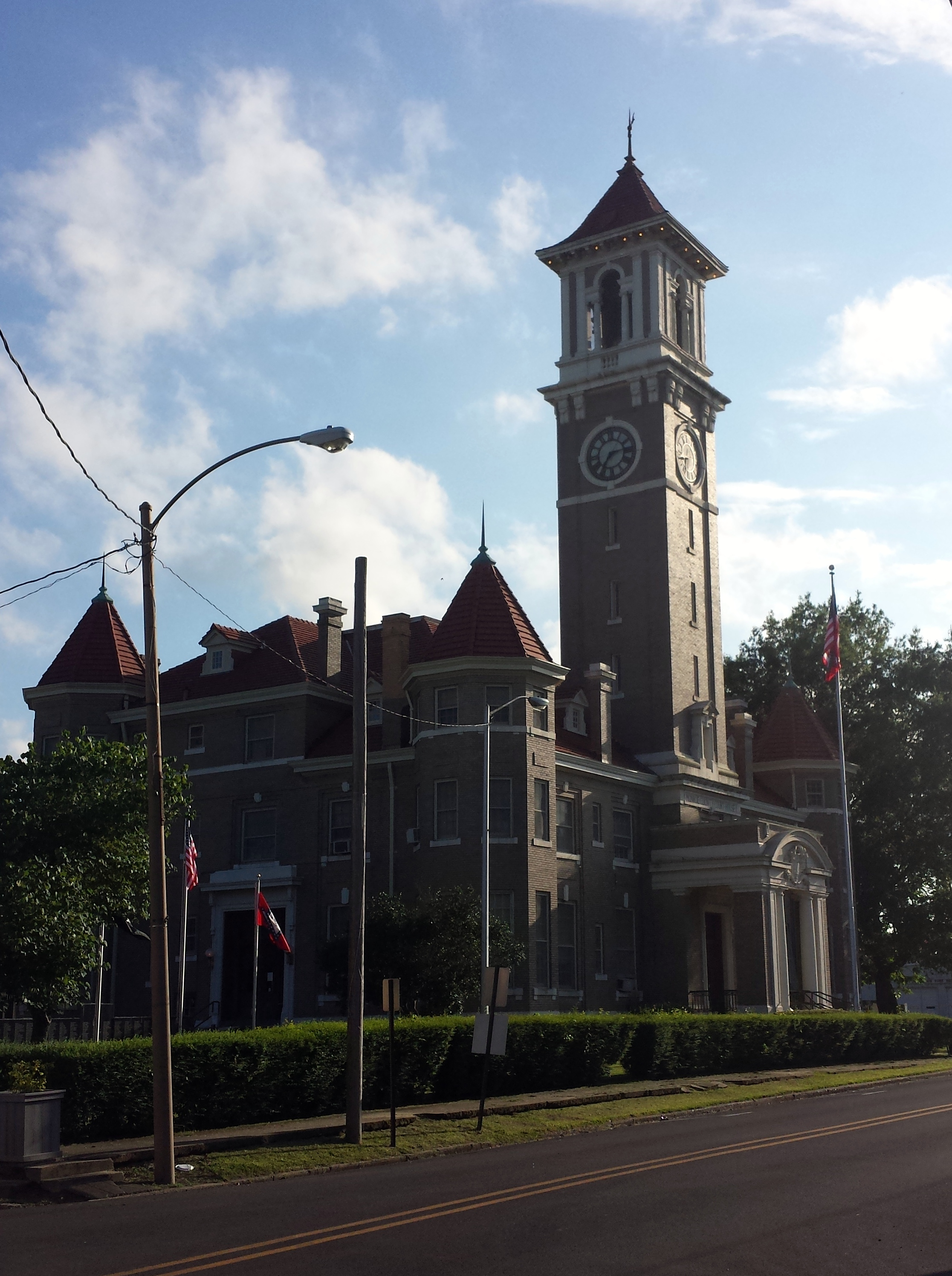
The Monroe County Courthouse in Clarendon, designed by Thompson and completed in 1911.

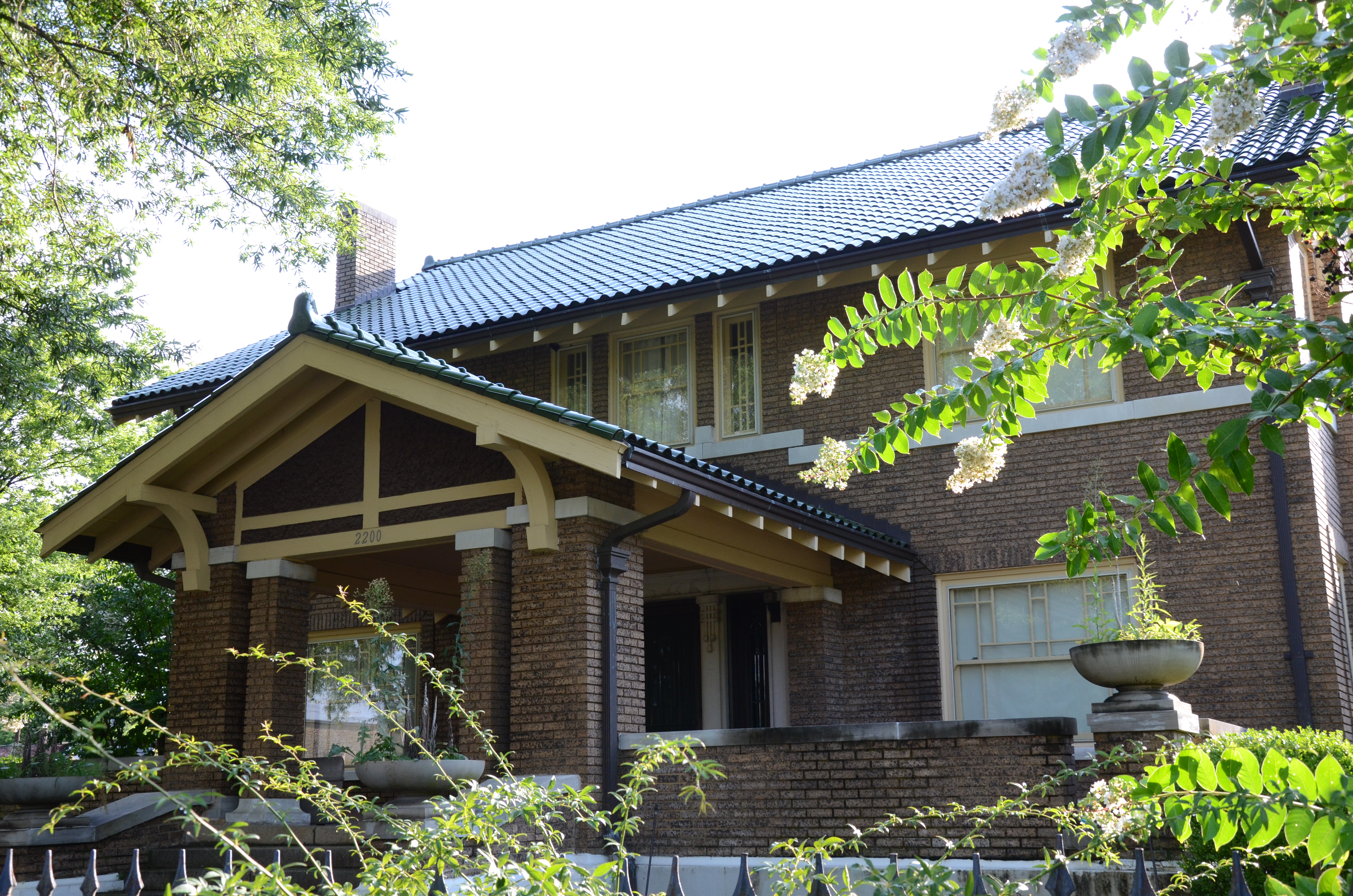
The Keith House in Little Rock, designed by Thompson and completed in 1912.

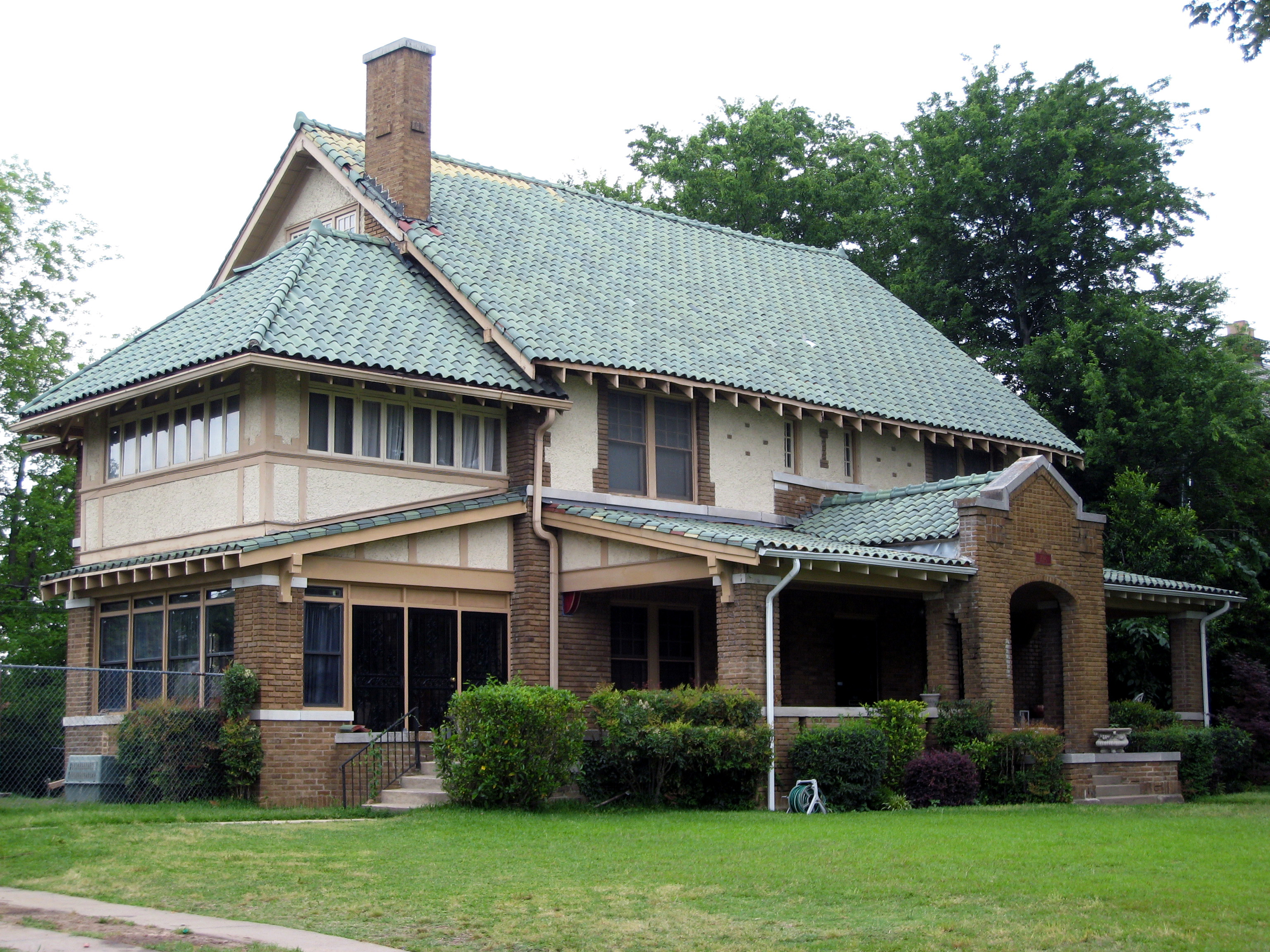
The Dunaway House in Little Rock, designed by Thompson and completed in 1915.

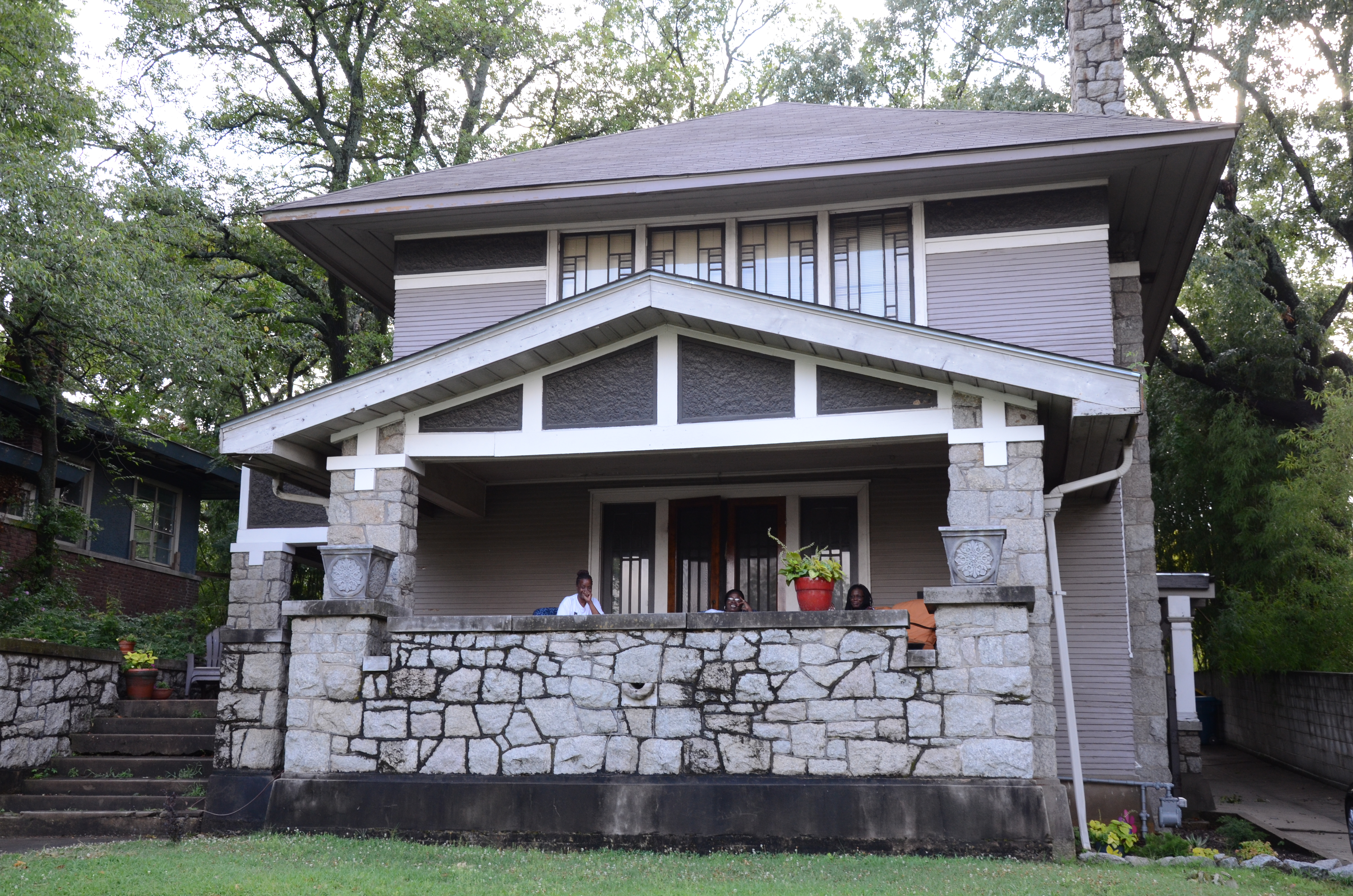
The Retan House in Little Rock, designed by Thompson and completed in 1915.

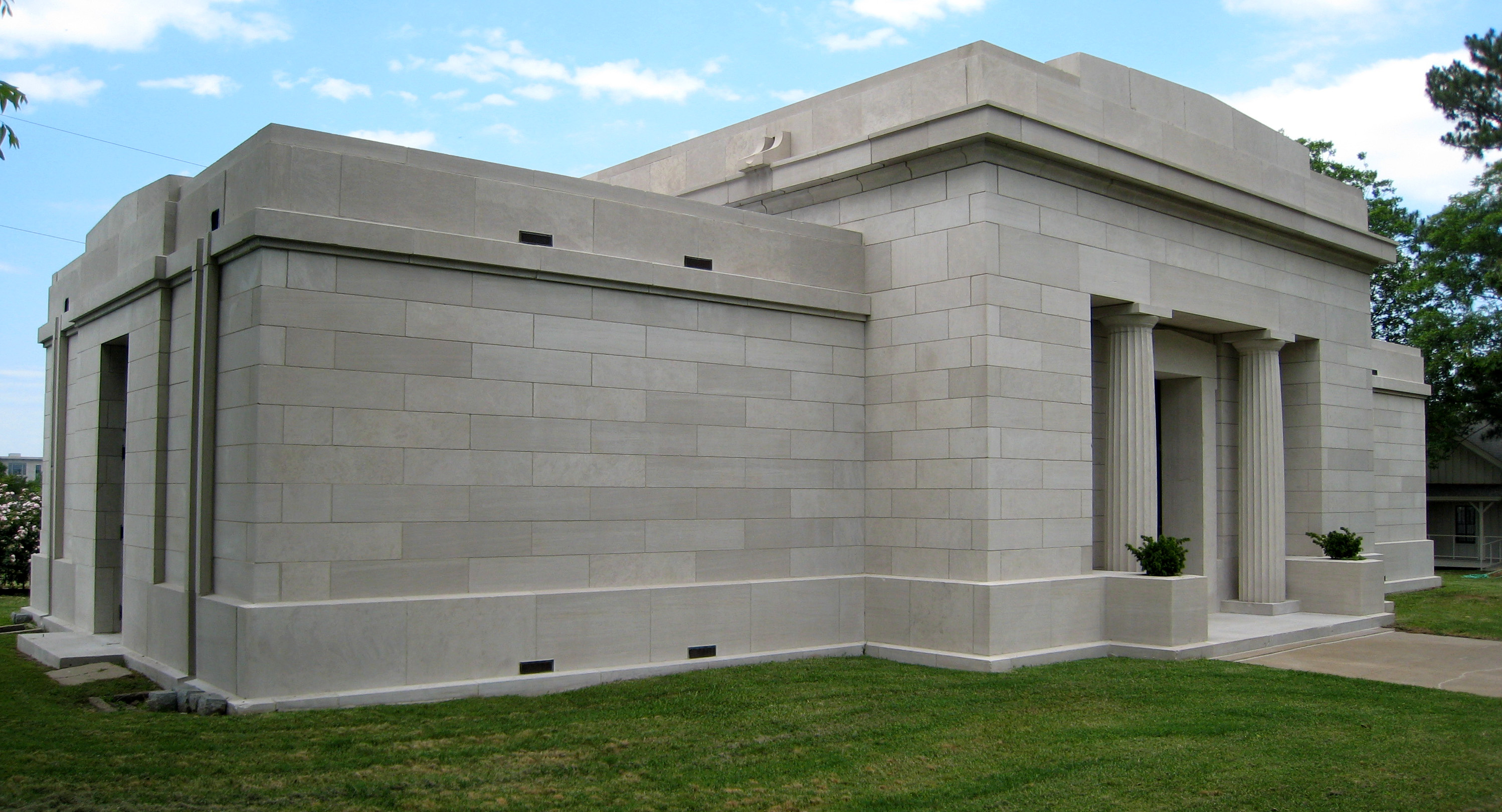
The Mount Holly Mausoleum in Little Rock, designed by Thompson & Harding and completed in 1917.

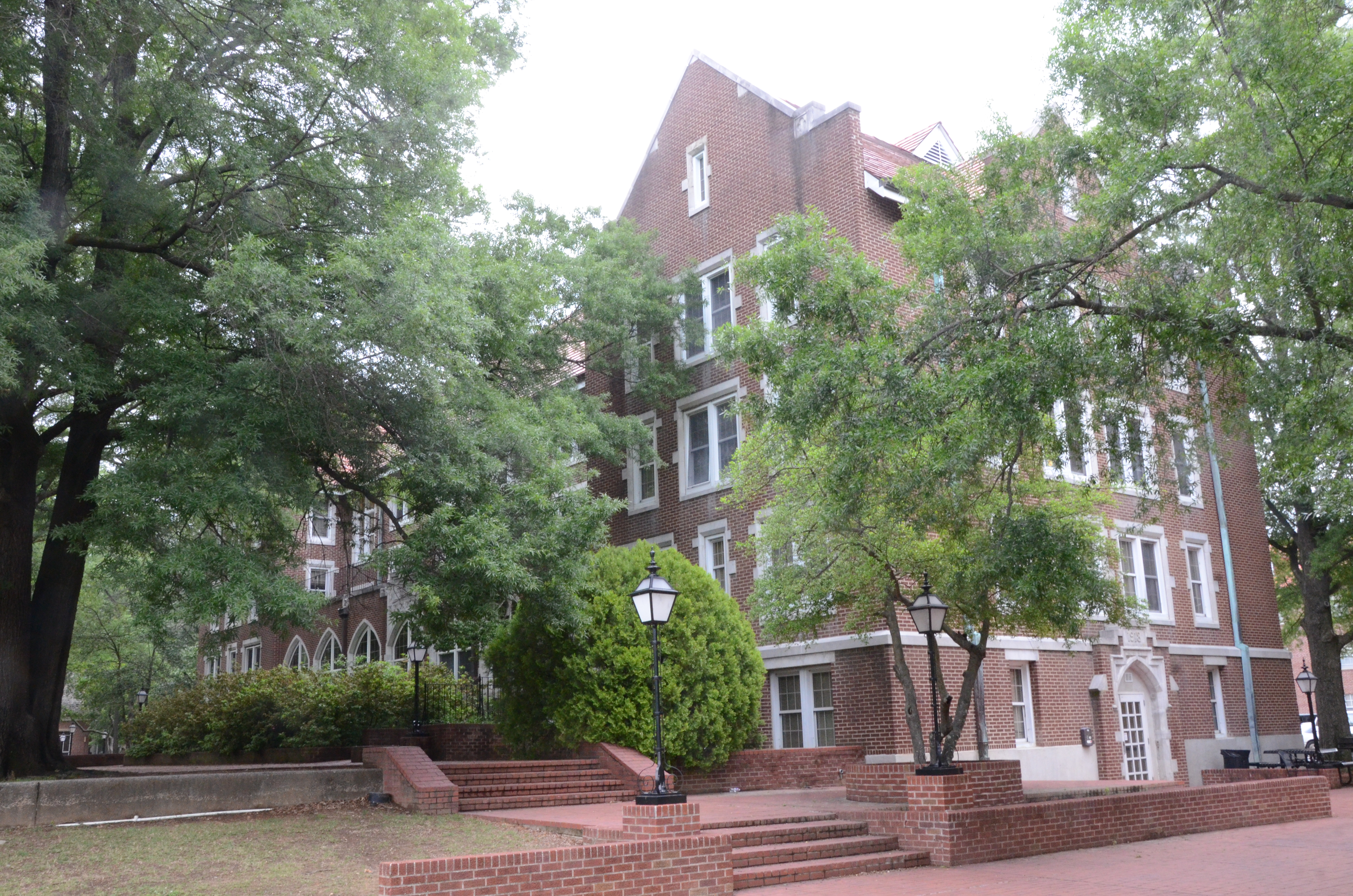
Martin Hall of Hendrix College, designed by Thompson & Harding and completed in 1918.

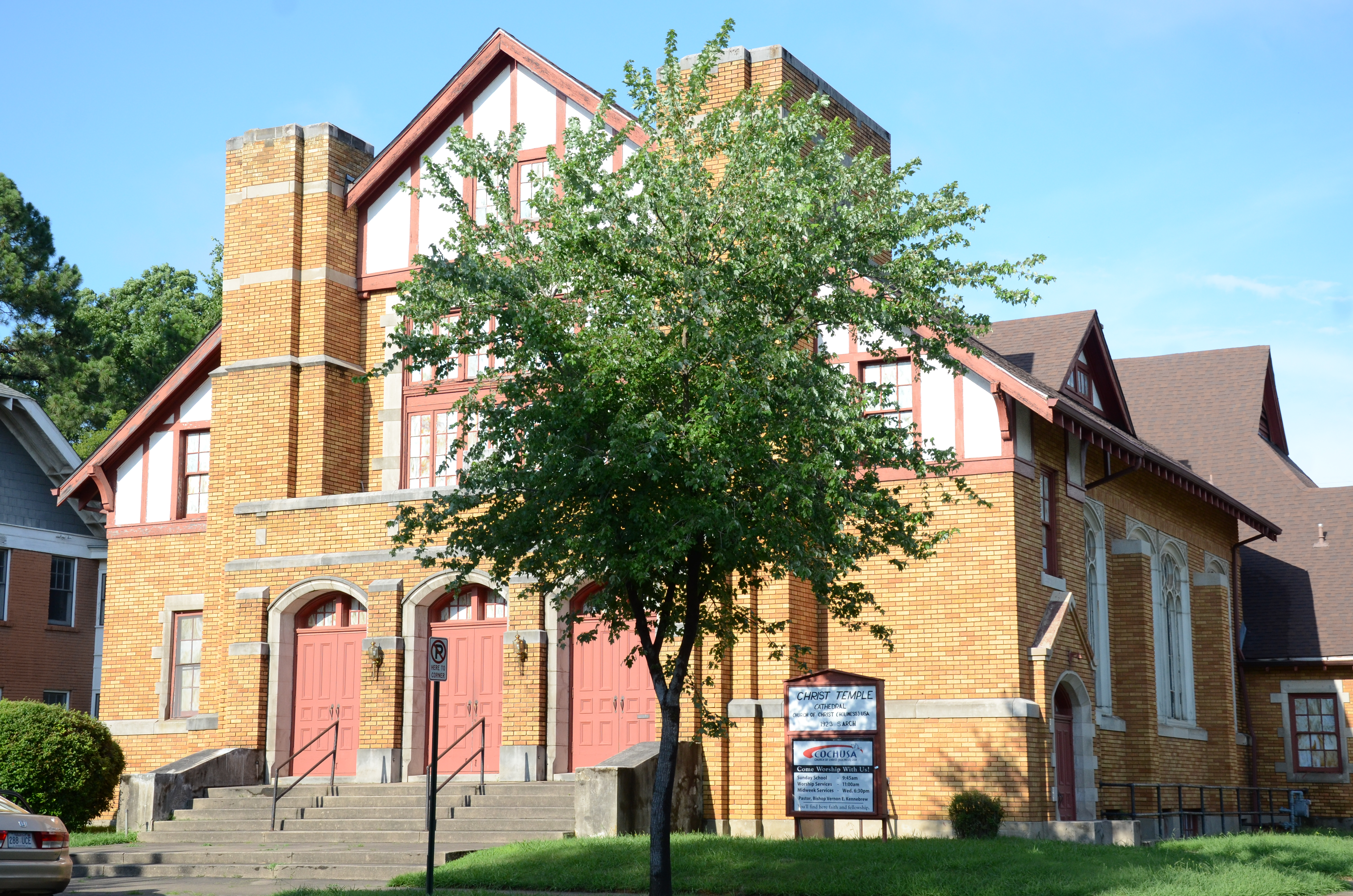
The former Central Presbyterian Church in Little Rock, designed by Thompson & Harding and completed in 1921.

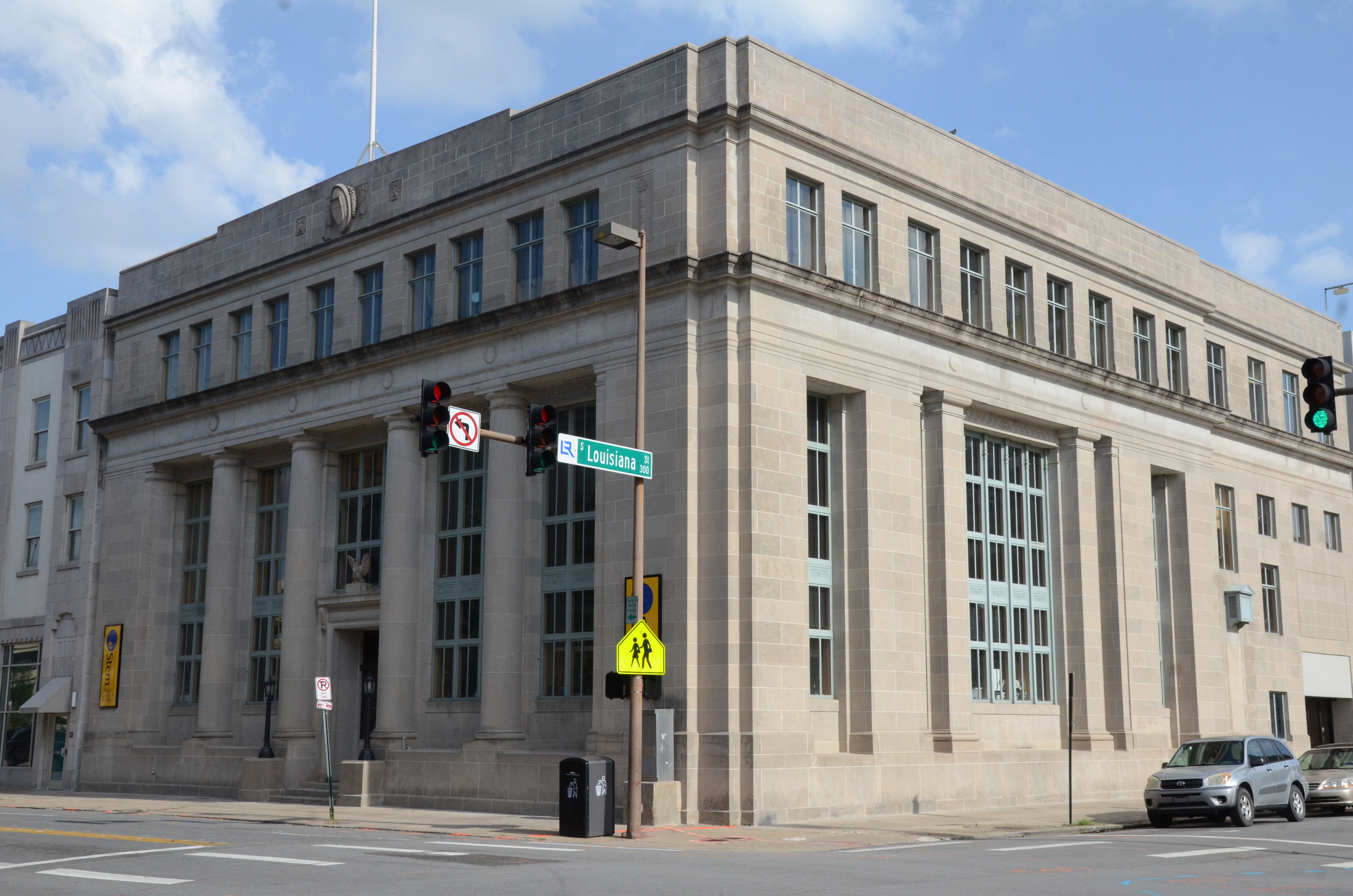
The former Federal Reserve Bank Building in Little Rock, designed by Thompson & Harding and completed in 1924.

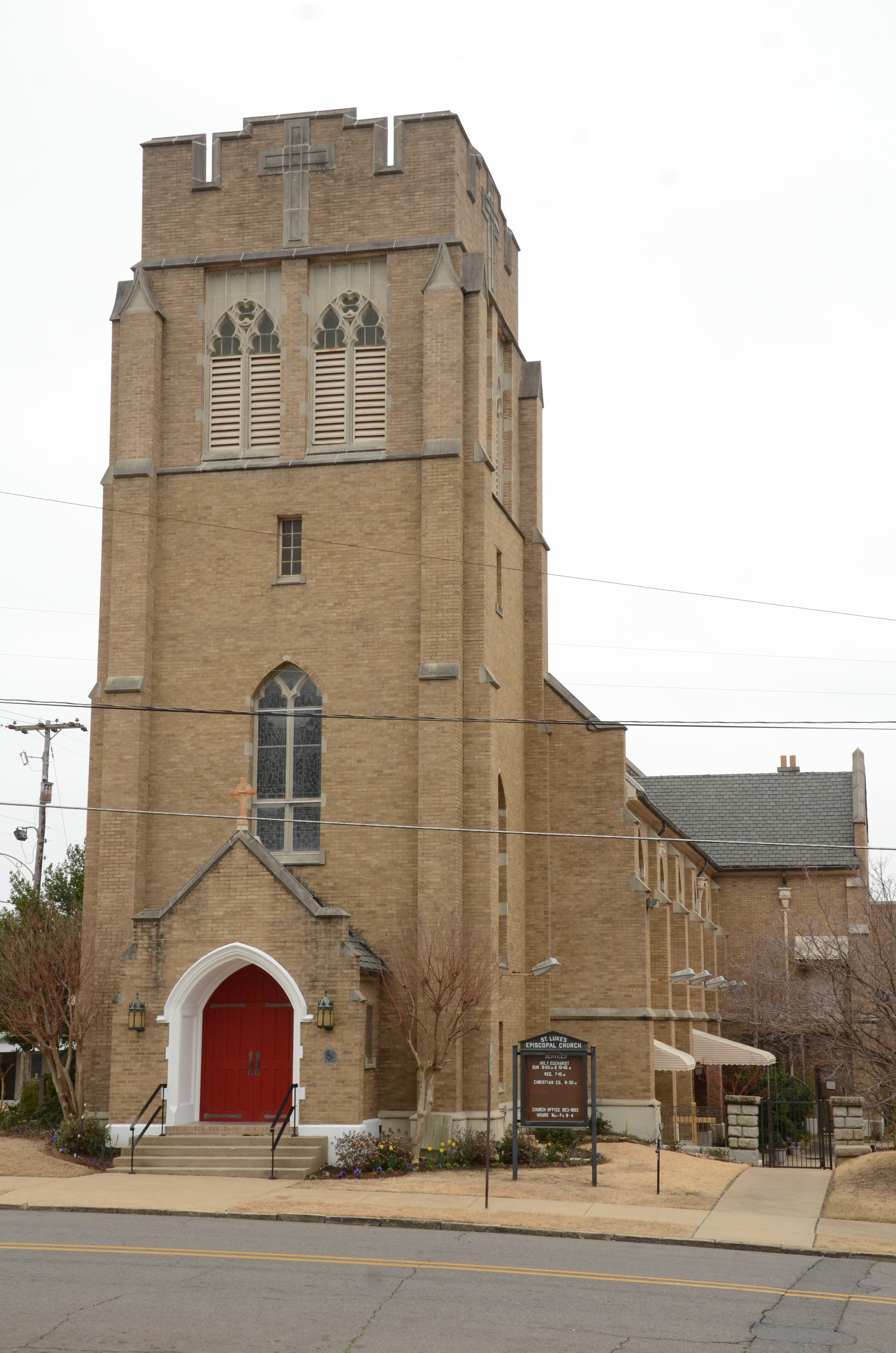
St. Luke's Episcopal Church in Hot Springs, designed by Thompson & Harding and completed in 1926.

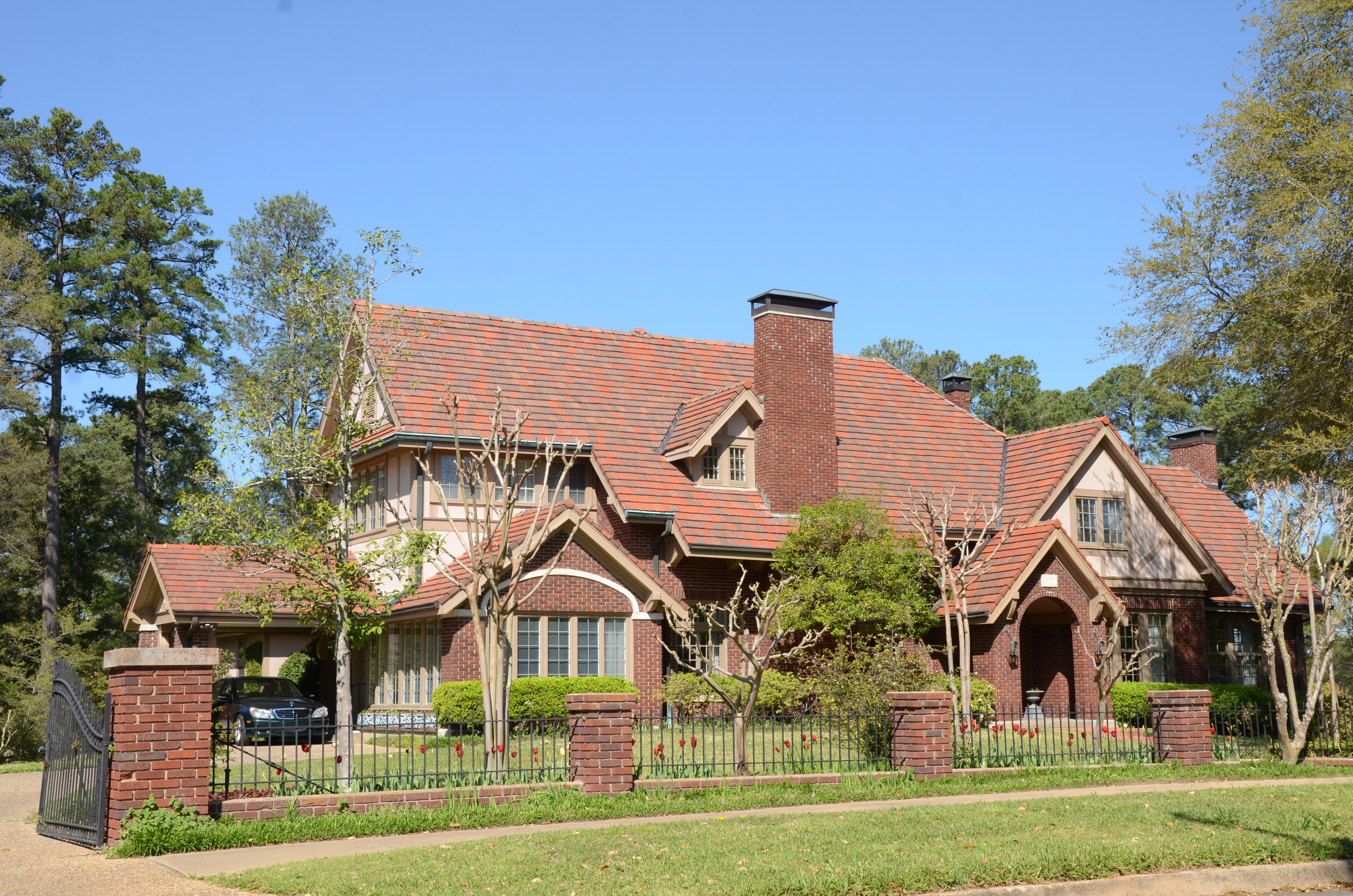
The Charles H. Murphy Sr. House in El Dorado, designed by Thompson and completed in 1926.

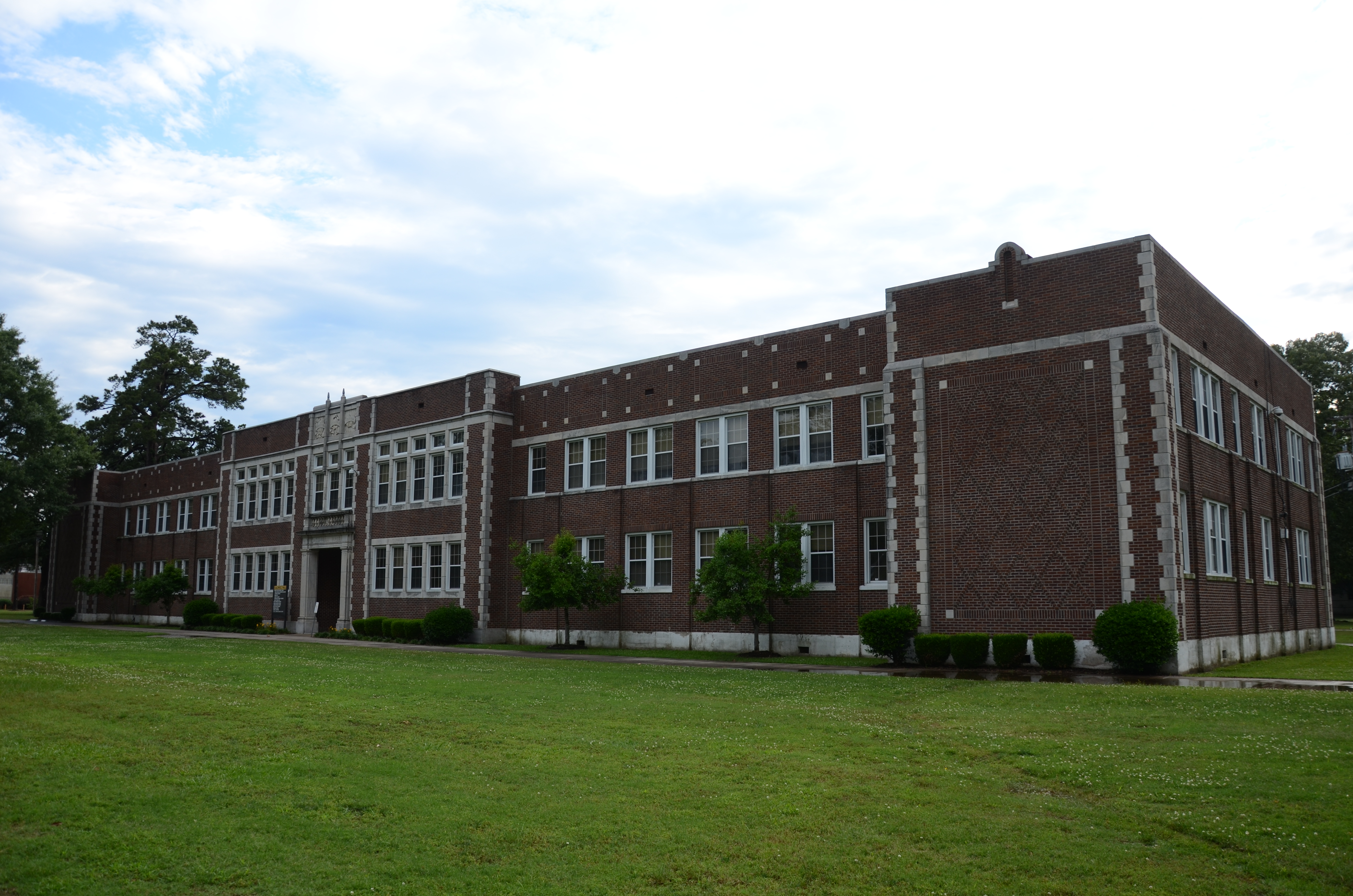
Caldwell Hall of the University of Arkansas at Pine Bluff, designed by Thompson, Sanders & Ginocchio and completed in 1928.

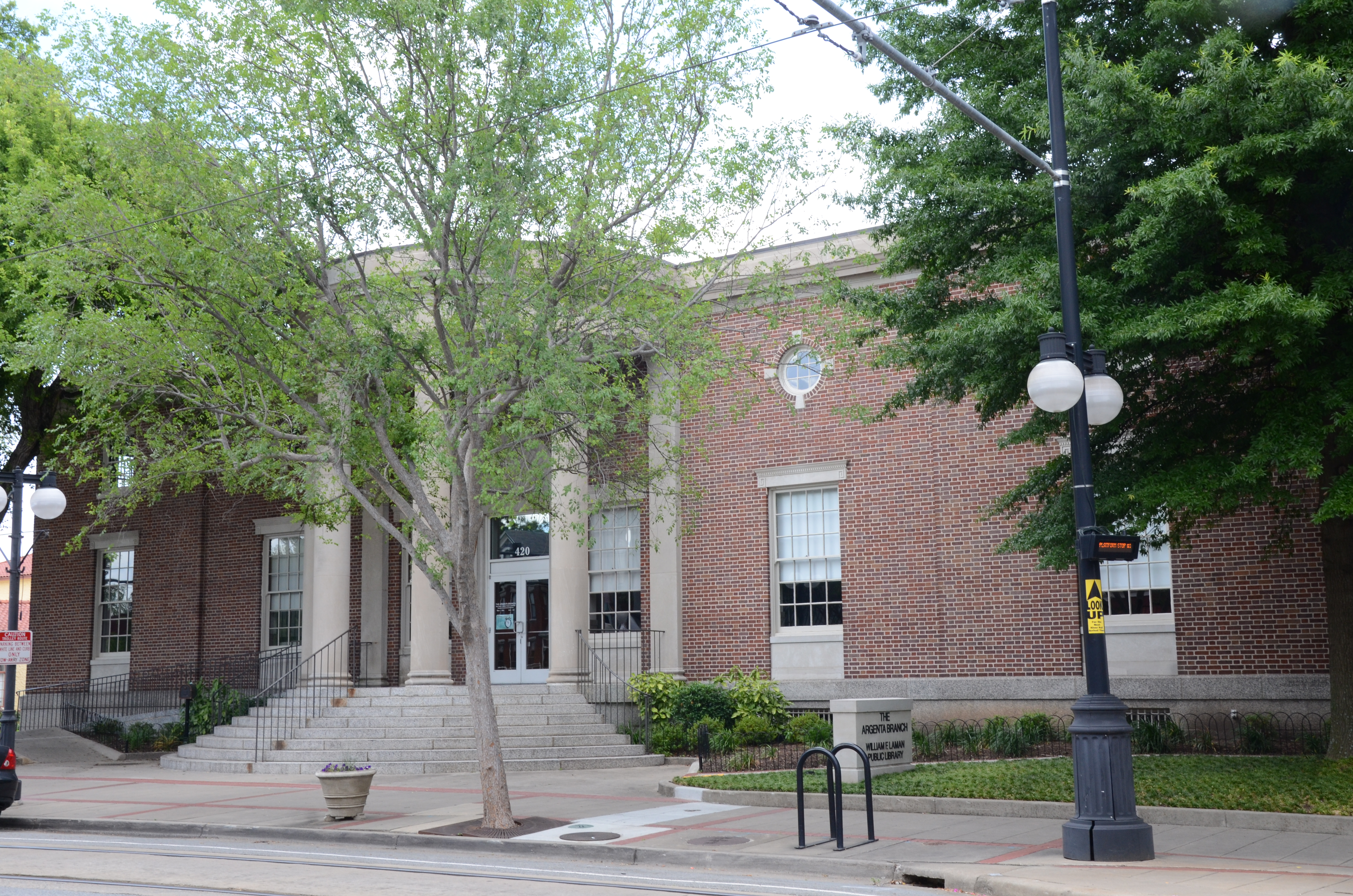
The former North Little Rock Post Office, designed by Thompson, Sanders & Ginocchio and completed in 1931.

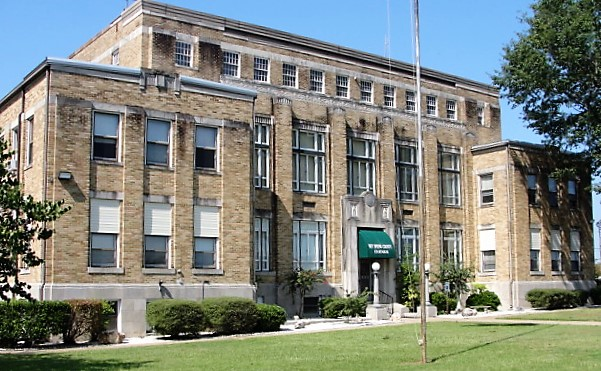
The Hot Spring County Courthouse in Malvern, designed by Thompson, Sanders & Ginocchio and completed in 1936.

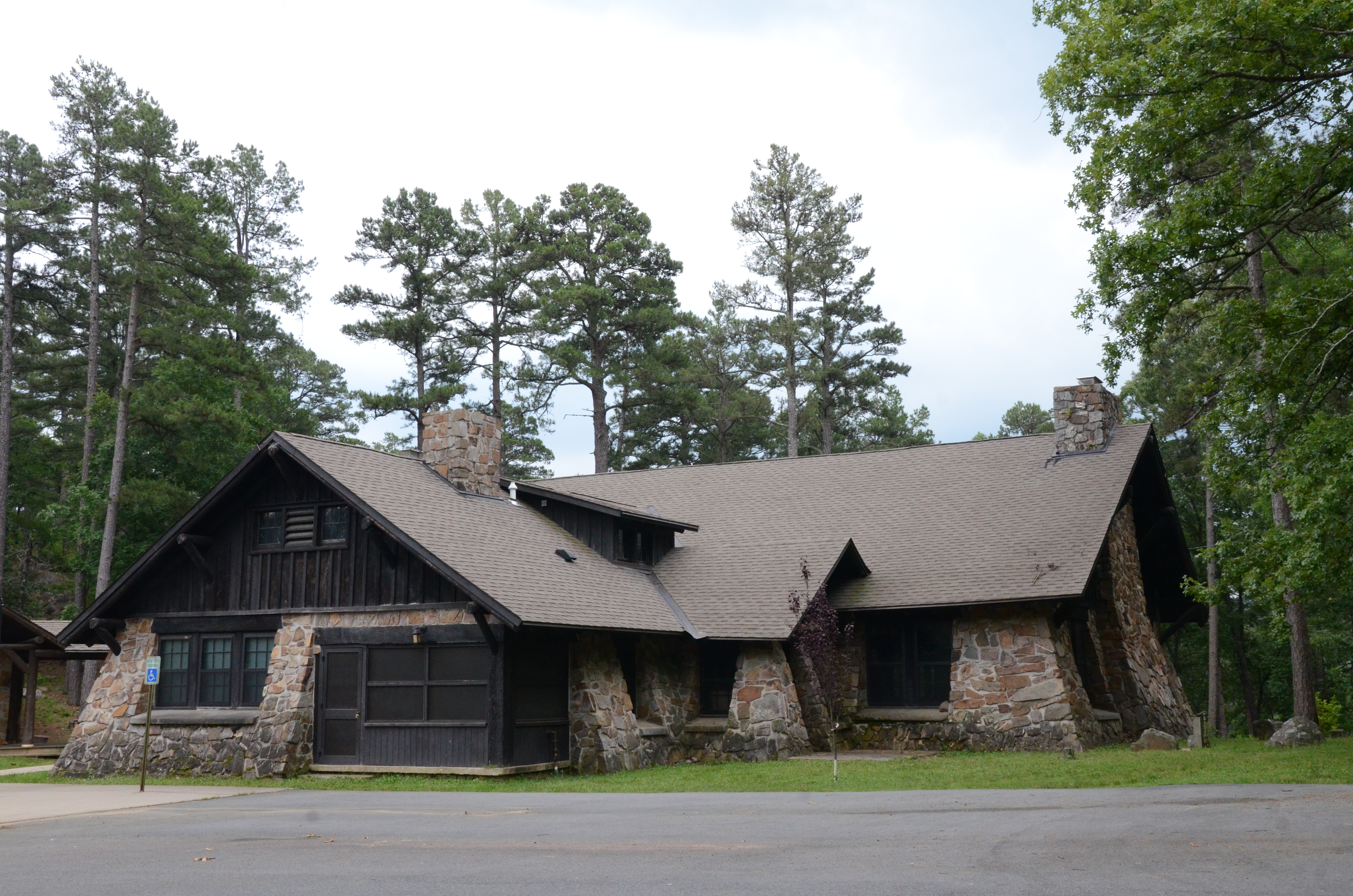
Ogden Hall of the Camp Ouachita Girl Scout Camp, designed by Thompson, Sanders & Ginocchio and completed circa 1938.

Charles L. Thompson and associates is an architectural group that was established in Arkansas since the late 1800s. It is now known as Cromwell Architects Engineers, Inc.. This article is about Thompson and associates' work as part of one architectural group, and its predecessor and descendant firms, including under names Charles L. Thompson, Thompson & Harding, Sanders & Ginocchio, and Thompson, Sanders and Ginocchio.

The firm was the "most prolific architectural firm" practicing in Arkansas in the late 1800s and early 1900s, and produced more than 2,000 buildings. The architectural group used standard and custom designs that both led and evolved with changing architectural taste in Arkansas. The group built a wide range of types of works, including large public buildings, commercial buildings, mansions, and small houses. Many works by Thompson and the associated firms survive and are listed on the National Register of Historic Places.

== Charles L. Thompson ==
Charles Louis Thompson (16 November 1868 – December 30, 1959) was the original head of the firm. Thompson was born in 1868 in Danville, Illinois. Orphaned at age fourteen, he and siblings moved to Indiana, where Charles began work at a mill, and in off hours began to learn drafting.

Architects Theodore M. Sanders and Frank J. Ginocchio Jr., partners since 1920, joined Thompson in partnership in 1927. Both had studied at the University of Illinois and Sanders had studied further at the Ecole des Beaux Arts in Paris. They brought design ideas of Prairie Style, influenced by Frank Lloyd Wright, and Art Deco architecture to the firm.

Thompson retired from practice in 1938 at about the age of 70. He left the office with his partners, who continued the firm under the name of Sanders & Ginocchio. Sanders withdrew in 1941, and Ginocchio continued the partnership with Edwin B. Cromwell, Thompson's son-in-law. The firm has been known as Cromwell Architects Engineers since 2000.

Architect John Parks Almand worked for the firm during 1912 to 1914 before forming his own practice.

== Thematic Resources study ==
A total of 143 properties in thirty Arkansas counties were nominated for NRHP listing in the 1982 study, "Charles L. Thompson Design Collection Thematic Resources", written by multiple authors. F. Hampton Roy, a Little Rock ophthalmologist, began cataloging the architectural drawings, expecting to complete a book. His collection eventually inspired this study, as Thompson and associates had such influence on Arkansas architecture. The properties listed under this study were selected from review of a large collection of original drawings by Charles L. Thompson, Fred J. H. Rickon, Thomas Harding Jr., Theo Sanders, and Frank Ginocchio. The collection of drawings covered 2500 properties representing a wide range of types and styles geographically distributed over the entire state of Arkansas. The authors wrote: "The 143 structures selected for nomination exemplify the firm's remarkable versatility and productivity from 1896 through 1931," and "Charles L. Thompson was the constant motivating force behind the firm's immense productivity and influence upon the state's built environment. Today the firm he established continues this legacy."

== Works ==
Dates are date of completion where known; other dates are approximate.

=== Charles L. Thompson, 1889–1891, 1897–1916 and 1925–1927 ===
- 1890 – Dr. Green's Hydropathic Clinic, (Note: A contributing resource to the Governor's Mansion Historic District, NRHP-listed in 1978 and expanded in 1988, 2002 and 2018.) 1623 Broadway St, Little Rock, Arkansas
- 1892 – Ragland House, (Note: NRHP-listed.) 1617 Center St, Little Rock, Arkansas
- 1899 – Campbell-Chrisp House, 102 Elm St, Bald Knob, Arkansas
- 1899 – Clark County Courthouse, 4th and Crittenden Sts, Arkadelphia, Arkansas
- 1899 – Pfeifer Brothers Department Store, 522-524 S Main St, Little Rock, Arkansas
- 1900 – Brown House, 1604 Caldwell St, Conway, Arkansas
- 1900 – Fletcher House, 909 Cumberland St, Little Rock, Arkansas
- 1900 – French-England House, 1700 Broadway, Little Rock, Arkansas
- 1900 – Hotze House, 1619 Louisiana St, Little Rock, Arkansas
- 1900 – Johnson Houses, 514, 516 and 518 E 8th St, Little Rock, Arkansas
- 1900 – Kittrell House, 1103 Hickory St, Texarkana, Arkansas
- 1900 – Thurston House, 923 Cumberland St, Little Rock, Arkansas
- 1900 – Vanetten House, 1012 Cumberland, Little Rock, Arkansas
- 1900 – Woodruff County Courthouse, 500 N 3rd St, Augusta, Arkansas
- 1901 – Saline County Courthouse, Courthouse Sq, Benton, Arkansas
- 1901 – St. Edwards Church, 823 Sherman St, Little Rock, Arkansas
- 1903 – Clark County Library, 609 Caddo St, Arkadelphia, Arkansas
- 1903 – Dr. James Wyatt Walton House, 301 W Sevier, Benton, Arkansas
- 1904 – Dortch Plantation, AR 130 at Bearskin Lake, Scott, Arkansas
- 1904 – Fordyce House, 2115 S Broadway, Little Rock, Arkansas
- 1904 – Ramsey-McClellan house, (Note: A contributing resource to the Clifton and Greening Streets Historic District, NRHP-listed in 1998.) 210 Cleveland Ave NW, Camden, Arkansas
- 1905 – Ella Carnall Hall, University of Arkansas, Fayetteville, Arkansas
- 1905 – Davis House, 212 Fulton St, Clarksville, Arkansas
- 1905 – Joe P. Eagle and D. R. Boone Building, 105–107 W Front St, Lonoke, Arkansas
- 1905 – Mehaffey House, 2101 Louisiana, Little Rock, Arkansas
- 1905 – Turner House, 1701 Center St, Little Rock, Arkansas
- 1905 – Vinson House, 2123 Broadway, Little Rock, Arkansas
- 1905 – Washington County Courthouse, College Ave and E Center St, Fayetteville, Arkansas
- 1906 – Remmel Flats, (Note: NRHP-listed. Also a contributing resource to the Governor's Mansion Historic District, NRHP-listed in 1978 and expanded in 1988, 2002 and 2018.) 1700-1702 Spring St, Little Rock, Arkansas
- 1907 – Bank of Carthage, AR 229, Carthage, Arkansas
- 1907 – Boone County Courthouse, (Note: NRHP-listed. Also a contributing resource to the Harrison Courthouse Square Historic District, NRHP-listed in 1999.) Courthouse Sq, Harrison, Arkansas
- 1907 – First Presbyterian Church, 213 Whittington, Hot Springs, Arkansas
- 1907 – Hemingway House and Barn, 3310 Old Missouri Rd, Fayetteville, Arkansas
- 1907 – Little Rock City Hall, 500 W Markham St, Little Rock, Arkansas
- 1907 – McKennon House, 115 Grandview, Clarksville, Arkansas
- 1907 – Nash House, 409 E 6th St, Little Rock, Arkansas
- 1907 – Nash House, 601 Rock St, Little Rock, Arkansas
- 1907 – Pugh House, US 165, Portland, Arkansas
- 1907 – Waters House, 515 Oak St, Fordyce, Arkansas
- 1908 – Croxson House, 1901 Gaines St, Little Rock, Arkansas
- 1908 – Fordyce Home Accident Insurance Company, (Note: NRHP-listed. Also a contributing resource to the Fordyce Commercial Historic District, NRHP-listed in 2008.) 300 N Main St, Fordyce, Arkansas
- 1908 – Marshall House, 2009 Arch St, Little Rock, Arkansas
- 1909 – First Baptist Church, (Note: Demolished. Formerly NRHP-listed.) 1719 Robinson Ave, Conway, Arkansas
- 1909 – Terminal Hotel, Markham and Victory Sts, Little Rock, Arkansas
- 1910 – Lo Beele House, 312 New York Ave, Brinkley, Arkansas
- 1910 – Dean House, US 165, Portland, Arkansas
- 1910 – Dunlap House, 101 Grandview, Clarksville, Arkansas
- 1910 – Fordyce House, 746 Park Ave, Hot Springs, Arkansas
- 1910 – Hospital and Benevolent Association, 11th and Cherry, Pine Bluff, Arkansas
- 1910 – E. S. Ready House, 929 Beech St, Helena, Arkansas
- 1910 – Stewart House, 1406 Summit St, Little Rock, Arkansas
- 1910 – Vaughan House, 2201 Broadway, Little Rock, Arkansas
- 1910 – Wheat House, 600 Center St, Lonoke, Arkansas
- 1910 – White House, 1015 Perry St, Helena, Arkansas
- 1911 – Hudson House, 304 W 5th St, Pine Bluff, Arkansas
- 1911 – Mitchell House, 1415 Spring St, Little Rock, Arkansas
- 1911 – Monroe County Courthouse, Courthouse Sq, Clarendon, Arkansas
- 1911 – Puddephatt House, 1820 S Olive St, Pine Bluff, Arkansas
- 1911 – Reid House, (Note: NRHP-listed. Also a contributing resource to the Hillcrest Historic District, NRHP-listed in 1990.) 1425 Kavanaugh St, Little Rock, Arkansas
- 1912 – Al-Amin Temple, 21st and Main Sts, Little Rock, Arkansas
- 1912 – Deener House, 310 E Center Ave, Searcy, Arkansas
- 1912 – Foster House, 303 N Hervey St, Hope, Arkansas
- 1912 – Johnson House, 315 Martin St, Pine Bluff, Arkansas
- 1912 – Keith House, 2200 Broadway, Little Rock, Arkansas
- 1912 – J. M. McClintock House, 43 Magnolia St, Marianna, Arkansas
- 1912 – W.S. McClintock House, 83 W Main St, Marianna, Arkansas
- 1912 – D. L. McRae House, 424 E Main St, Prescott, Arkansas
- 1912 – Russell House, 1617 S Olive St, Pine Bluff, Arkansas
- 1913 – Frauenthal House, 631 Western, Conway, Arkansas
- 1913 – Galloway Hall, Hendrix College, Conway, Arkansas
- 1913 – Ida Hicks House, 410 W Arch St, Searcy, Arkansas
- 1913 – Katzenstein House, 902 W 5th St, Pine Bluff, Arkansas
- 1913 – Little Rock Central Fire Station, 520 W Markham St, Little Rock, Arkansas
- 1913 – Mann House, 422 Forrest St, Forrest City, Arkansas
- 1913 – Merchants & Farmers Bank, Waterman and Main Sts, Dumas, Arkansas
- 1913 – President's House, Hendrix College, Conway, Arkansas
- 1913 – Walls House, 406 Jefferson St, Lonoke, Arkansas
- 1914 – Boone County Jail, Central Ave and Willow St, Harrison, Arkansas
- 1914 – Bridges Building, (Note: A contributing resource to the Pine Bluff Commercial Historic District, NRHP-listed in 2008.) 500-502 S Main St, Pine Bluff, Arkansas
- 1914 – England House, 2121 Arch St, Little Rock, Arkansas
- 1914 – Farrell Houses, 2109, 2111, 2115 and 2121 Louisiana St, Little Rock, Arkansas
- 1914 – Rogers House, 400 W 18th St, Little Rock, Arkansas
- 1914 – Wooten-Collette house, (Note: A contributing resource to the Beech Street Historic District, NRHP-listed in 1987.) 616 Miller St, Helena, Arkansas
- 1915 – Baer House, 1010 Rock St, Little Rock, Arkansas
- 1915 – Dunaway House, 2022 Battery, Little Rock, Arkansas
- 1915 – Eagle House, 217 Ash St, Lonoke, Arkansas
- 1915 – Pulaski Heights City Hall (former), (Note: A contributing resource to the Hillcrest Historic District, NRHP-listed in 1990.) 2713 Kavanaugh Blvd, Little Rock, Arkansas
- 1915 – Retan House, 2510 Broadway, Little Rock, Arkansas
- 1915 – U. M. Rose School, Izard and W 13th Sts, Little Rock, Arkansas
- 1915 – Skillern House, 2522 Arch St, Little Rock, Arkansas
- 1916 – Clark House, 1324 S Main St, Malvern, Arkansas
- 1916 – Darragh House, 2412 Broadway, Little Rock, Arkansas
- 1916 – Gazzola and Vaccaro Building, 131-133 W Cypress, Brinkley, Arkansas
- 1916 – Nichol House, 205 Park Pl, Pine Bluff, Arkansas
- 1916 – St. Paul's Parish Church, 5th and Main, Batesville, Arkansas
- 1916 – Trimble House, 518 Center St, Lonoke, Arkansas
- 1917 – Beyerlein House, 412 W 14th St, Little Rock, Arkansas
- 1918 – Bethel House, Erwin and 2nd Sts, Des Arc, Arkansas
- 1920 – Fred and Lucy Alexander Schaer House, 13219 US 70, Galloway, Arkansas
- 1920 – Tom Watkins House, Oak and Race Sts, Searcy, Arkansas
- 1925 – Associate Reformed Presbyterian Church, 3323 W 12th St, Little Rock, Arkansas
- 1925 – First National Bank of Morrilton, Main and Moose Sts, Morrilton, Arkansas
- 1925 – Henry Crawford McKinney House, 510 E Faulkner, El Dorado, Arkansas
- 1926 – Bishop Hiram A. Boaz House, (Note: Designed by Marion Fresenius Fooshee of Dallas, architect, with Charles L. Thompson, supervising architect. NRHP-listed.) 22 Armistead Rd, Little Rock, Arkansas
- 1926 – Charles H. Murphy Sr. House, 900 N Madison Ave, El Dorado, Arkansas
- 1927 – Boone House, 4014 Lookout, Little Rock, Arkansas

=== Rickon & Thompson, 1891–1897 ===
- 1894 – Hemingway House, 1720 Arch St, Little Rock, Arkansas

=== Thompson & Harding, 1916–1925 ===
- 1915 – Gracie House, AR-88, New Gascony, Arkansas
- 1917 – Arkadelphia High School Domestic Science Building, 11th and Haddock Sts, Arkadelphia, Arkansas
- 1917 – Florence Crittenton Home, 3600 W 11th St, Little Rock, Arkansas
- 1917 – McRae House, 1113 E 3rd St, Hope, Arkansas
- 1917 – Mitchell House, 1138 Main St, Batesville, Arkansas
- 1917 – Mount Holly Mausoleum, 12th and Broadway, Little Rock, Arkansas
- 1917 – Remmel Apartments, 1704-1706 and 1708-1710 Spring and 409-411 W 17th Sts, Little Rock, Arkansas
- 1918 – Farmers State Bank, 1001 Front St, Conway, Arkansas
- 1918 – Howson House, 1700 S Olive St, Pine Bluff, Arkansas
- 1918 – Martin Hall, Hendrix College, Conway, Arkansas
- 1918 – Shull House, 418 Park, Lonoke, Arkansas
- 1919 – Bush House, 1516 Ringo St, Little Rock, Arkansas
- 1919 – Frauenthal House, 2008 Arch St, Little Rock, Arkansas
- 1919 – H. D. Hicks house, (Note: A contributing resource to the Robinson Historic District, NRHP-listed in 2001.) 1814 Robinson Ave, Conway, Arkansas
- 1919 – T. C. McRae House, 506 E Elm St, Prescott, Arkansas
- 1919 – Smith House, Memphis Ave, Wheatley, Arkansas
- 1919 – Strauss House, 528 E Page St, Malvern, Arkansas
- 1919 – Thane House, Levy and 1st Sts, Arkansas City, Arkansas
- 1920 – Columbia County Jail, Calhoun and Jefferson Sts, Magnolia, Arkansas
- 1920 – McLean House, 470 Ridgeway, Little Rock, Arkansas
- 1921 – Central Presbyterian Church, 1921 Arch St, Little Rock, Arkansas
- 1921 – Exchange Bank Building, 423 Main St, Little Rock, Arkansas
- 1921 – Hardy House, 2400 Broadway, Little Rock, Arkansas
- 1921 – Merchants and Planters Bank, 214 Madison, Clarendon, Arkansas
- 1921 – Winfield Methodist Church, 1601 Louisiana St, Little Rock, Arkansas
- 1923 – First United Methodist Church Jefferson and Cross Sts, DeWitt, Arkansas
- 1923 – Schaer House, 1862 Arch St, Little Rock, Arkansas
- 1924 – Federal Reserve Bank Building, 123 W 3rd St, Little Rock, Arkansas
- 1924 – Roselawn Memorial Park Gatehouse, Roselawn Memorial Park, Little Rock, Arkansas
- 1924 – S. G. Smith House, 1837 Caldwell St, Conway, Arkansas
- 1925 – Lightle House, 605 Race Ave, Searcy, Arkansas
- 1926 – St. Luke's Episcopal Church, Spring and Cottage Sts, Hot Springs, Arkansas

=== Thompson, Sanders & Ginocchio, 1927–1938 ===
- 1927 – Wade Building, 231 Central, Hot Springs, Arkansas
- 1928 – Caldwell Hall, University of Arkansas at Pine Bluff, Pine Bluff, Arkansas
- 1928 – Hall House, 32 Edgehill, Little Rock, Arkansas
- 1928 – Interstate Orphanage, 339 Combs, Hot Springs, Arkansas
- 1930 – Christ the King Church, Greenwood Ave and S S Sts, Fort Smith, Arkansas
- 1929 – Coca-Cola Building, 211 N Moose, Morrilton, Arkansas
- 1929 – Moore Building, 519-523 Center St, Little Rock, Arkansas
- 1929 – Moore House, 20 Armistead, Little Rock, Arkansas
- 1930 – Little Rock Boys Club, 8th and Scott Sts, Little Rock, Arkansas
- 1930 – Newport Junior & Senior High School, Remmel Park, Newport, Arkansas
- 1930 – Park Hotel, 210 Fountain, Hot Springs, Arkansas
- 1930 – Riviera Hotel, 719 Central, Hot Springs, Arkansas
- 1931 – Lloyd England Hall, Robinson Maneuver Training Center, North Little Rock, Arkansas
- 1931 – North Little Rock Post Office, (Note: NRHP-listed. Also a contributing resource to the Argenta Historic District, NRHP-listed in 1993.) 420 N Main St, North Little Rock, Arkansas
- 1932 – Immaculate Heart of Mary Church, 7006 Jasna Gora Dr, North Little Rock, Arkansas
- 1936 – Hot Spring County Courthouse, 210 Locust St, Malvern, Arkansas
- 1938 – Ogden Hall, (Note: A contributing resource to the Camp Ouachita Girl Scout Camp Historic District, NRHP-listed in 1992.) Camp Ouachita Girl Scout Camp, Perry County, Arkansas

=== Ginocchio, Cromwell & Associates, 1947–1961 ===
- 1960 – St. Andrew's Episcopal Church, (Note: Designed principally by Robert H. Millett.) 1070 S Church St, Mountain Home, Arkansas
