= Johnson House =

Johnson House may refer to:

== United Kingdom ==
- Dr. Johnson's House, 17 Gough Square, London

== United States ==
=== Alabama ===
- John Johnson House (Leighton, Alabama)

=== Arkansas ===
- Johnson House (514 East 8th Street, Little Rock, Arkansas)
- Johnson House (516 East 8th Street, Little Rock, Arkansas)
- Johnson House (518 East 8th Street, Little Rock, Arkansas)
- Johnson House (Pine Bluff, Arkansas)
- Johnson House and Mill, Johnson

=== California ===
- Johnson House, Old Town San Diego

=== Connecticut ===
- Philip Johnson Glass House, New Canaan, Connecticut

=== Delaware ===
- William Julius "Judy" Johnson House, Marshallton
- Johnson-Morris House, Newark vicinity

=== Florida ===
- C. L. Johnson House, Lake Wales
- Johnson-Wolff House, Tampa

=== Idaho ===
- John G. Johnson (Rintakangas) Homestead, Lake Fork, listed on the National Register of Historic Places (NRHP)
- John S. Johnson (Sampila) Homestead, Lake Fork, listed on the NRHP

=== Iowa ===
- George Johnson House (Calamus, Iowa)
- William A. and Ida C. Johnson House, Oskaloosa

=== Kansas ===
- Johnson House (Lindsborg, Kansas)

=== Kentucky ===
- Ben Johnson House (Bardstown, Kentucky)
- Ben Johnson House (Flemingsburg Junction, Kentucky), listed on the NRHP

=== Louisiana ===
- Johnson House (Mandeville, Louisiana), listed on the NRHP

=== Massachusetts ===
- Johnson House (Methuen, Massachusetts)
- John and Edward Johnson Three-Decker, Worcester
- John Johnson Three-Decker, Worcester

=== Michigan ===
- Abner C. Johnson House, Flint

=== Minnesota ===
- John B. Johnson House, Osakis, listed on the NRHP
- John A. Johnson House, St. Peter, listed on the NRHP

=== Mississippi ===
- William Johnson House (Natchez, Mississippi)

=== Missouri ===
- George Johnson House (Lexington, Missouri)
- The Old Stagecoach Stop, previously known as Johnson House (Waynesville, Pulaski County, Missouri,)

=== Montana ===
- Johnson House (Bozeman, Montana), listed on the NRHP

=== New Jersey ===
- Johnson Hall (Salem)
- William H. Johnson House, New Brunswick

=== New York ===
- Johnson House (Cape Vincent, New York)

=== North Carolina ===
- John Hiram Johnson House, Saluda

=== Oklahoma ===
- Johnson House (Chandler, Oklahoma)

=== Pennsylvania ===
- John Johnson House (Philadelphia, Pennsylvania)

=== South Dakota ===
- William Johnson House (Fruitdale, South Dakota)

=== Tennessee ===
- William W. Johnson House, Franklin
- Andrew Johnson National Historic Site, Greeneville

=== Texas ===
- John Johnson House (McKinney, Texas), listed on the NRHP
- Johnson House (San Marcos, Texas), listed on the NRHP

=== Utah ===
- William Derby Johnson, Jr., House, Kanab, listed on the NRHP
- David and Hattie S. Rasmuson Johnson House, Sandy, listed on the NRHP
- John A. and Annie C. Olsen Johnson House, Sandy, listed on the NRHP
- Mont and Harriet Johnson House, Springville

=== Vermont ===
- Johnson House (University of Vermont), Burlington

=== Washington ===
- Johnson House (Nordland, Washington), listed on the NRHP
- Johnson House (Yelm, Washington), listed on the NRHP

=== Wisconsin ===
- A.P. Johnson House, Delavan
- Iverson-Johnson House, Stoughton

== See also ==
- John Johnson House (disambiguation)
- George Johnson House (disambiguation)
- Ben Johnson House (disambiguation)
- William Johnson House (disambiguation)
- Johnson Hall (disambiguation)
- Johnson Farm (disambiguation)
- Johnson Barn (disambiguation)
