= Johnson Farm =

Johnson Farm may refer to:

in the United States

(by state then town)

- Johnson Farm in Saint George, Utah that houses the St. George Dinosaur Discovery Site, a fossil site and museum
- Johnson Home Farm, Taylor's Bridge, Delaware, listed on the National Register of Historic Places (NRHP) in New Castle County
- Quet Johnson Farm, Richfield, Idaho, listed on the NRHP in Lincoln County
- Johnson-Wolfe Farm, Comus, Maryland, NRHP-listed
- Atkins-Johnson Farmhouse Property, Gladstone, Missouri, listed on the NRHP in Clay County
- Moss-Johnson Farm, Hendersonville, North Carolina, listed on the NRHP in Henderson County
- Johnson Farm (Kipling, North Carolina), NRHP-listed
- John Johnson Farm, Hiram township, Ohio, NRHP-listed
- Knipe-Johnson Farm, Upper Gywnedd Township, Pennsylvania, listed on the NRHP in Montgomery County
- Keener-Johnson Farm, Seymour, Tennessee, listed on the NRHP in Sevier County
- Alfred Johnson Farm, Mountain City, Tennessee, listed on the NRHP in Johnson County
- Dan Johnson Farmstead, Williston, Vermont, listed on the NRHP in Chittenden County
- J. J. Johnson Farm, Georgetown, Texas, listed on the NRHP in Williamson County
- Johnson Farm (Lake Ray Roberts, Texas), listed on the NRHP in Denton County

== See also ==
- Johnson Barn (disambiguation)
- Johnson House (disambiguation)
