= William Johnson House =

William Johnson House may refer to:

in the United States (by state then city)

- William Julius "Judy" Johnson House, Marshallton, Delaware, listed on the National Register of Historic Places (NRHP) in New Castle County
- William A. and Ida C. Johnson House, Oskaloosa, Iowa, listed on the NRHP
- William Johnson House (Ellicott City, Maryland)
- William Johnson House (Natchez, Mississippi), listed on the NRHP in Adams County
- William H. Johnson House, New Brunswick, New Jersey, NRHP-listed
- William Johnson House in the Beaufort Historic District, South Carolina
- William Johnson House (Fruitdale, South Dakota), NRHP-listed, in Butte County
- William W. Johnson House, Franklin, Tennessee, listed on the NRHP in Williamson County
- William Derby Johnson Jr. House, Kanab, Utah, listed on the NRHP in Kane County
