= John Johnson House =

John Johnson House may refer to:

- John Johnson House (Leighton, Alabama), listed on the NRHP in Colbert County, Alabama
- John G. Johnson (Rintakangas) Homestead, Lake Fork, Idaho, listed on the NRHP in Valley County, Idaho
- John S. Johnson (Sampila) Homestead, Lake Fork, Idaho, listed on the NRHP in Valley County, Idaho
- John and Edward Johnson Three-Decker, Worcester, Massachusetts, listed on the NRHP in Massachusetts
- John Johnson Three-Decker, Worcester, Massachusetts, listed on the NRHP in Massachusetts
- John B. Johnson House, Osakis, Minnesota, listed on the NRHP in Douglas County, Minnesota
- John A. Johnson House, St. Peter, Minnesota, listed on the NRHP in Nicollet County, Minnesota
- John Johnson Farm, Hiram, Ohio, listed on the NRHP in Ohio
- John Hiram Johnson House, Saluda, North Carolina, listed on the NRHP in Polk County, North Carolina
- John Johnson House (Philadelphia, Pennsylvania), a U.S. National Historic Landmark and NRHP-listed
- John Johnson House (McKinney, Texas), listed on the NRHP in Collin County, Texas
- John A. and Annie C. Olsen Johnson House, Sandy, Utah, listed on the NRHP in Salt Lake County, Utah
- John Johnson Saloon, Eau Claire, Wisconsin, listed on the NRHP in Eau Claire County, Wisconsin

== See also ==
- Johnson House (disambiguation)
