= Thomas Johnson House =

Thomas Johnson House may refer to:

- Thomas Johnson House (Plainfield, Ohio), listed on the National Register of Historic Places in Coshocton County, Ohio
- Thomas Johnson House (McKinney, Texas), listed on the National Register of Historic Places in Collin County, Texas

== See also ==
- Thomas Johnson Polygonal Barn, Wellman, Iowa, listed on the National Register of Historic Places listings in Washington County, Iowa
- Johnson House (disambiguation)
