= Ben Jonson (disambiguation) =

Ben Jonson (1572–1637) was an English poet and dramatist.

Ben Jonson may also refer to:

- Ben Jonson (1815 ship), a British Westindiaman

== See also ==
- Ben Jonson Journal, a Scottish journal on Ben Jonson
- Ben Jonson folios, the works of Ben Jonson
- Ben Johnson (disambiguation)
