= Ben Johnston =

Ben Johnston or Benjamin Johnston may refer to:

- Ben Johnston (rugby union) (born 1978), British rugby player
- Ben Johnston (composer) (1926–2019), American contemporary composer of concert music
- Bennett Johnston, Jr. (1932–2025), Washington, D.C.–based lobbyist
- Ben Johnston (Scottish musician) (born 1980), drummer, vocalist, and songwriter with Biffy Clyro
- Ben Johnston (rugby league) (born 1992), English rugby league player
- John Benjamin Johnston, Canadian politician

== See also ==
- Ben Johnson (disambiguation)
