= James Scales House =

Historic house in Tennessee, United States

- U.S. National Register of Historic Places
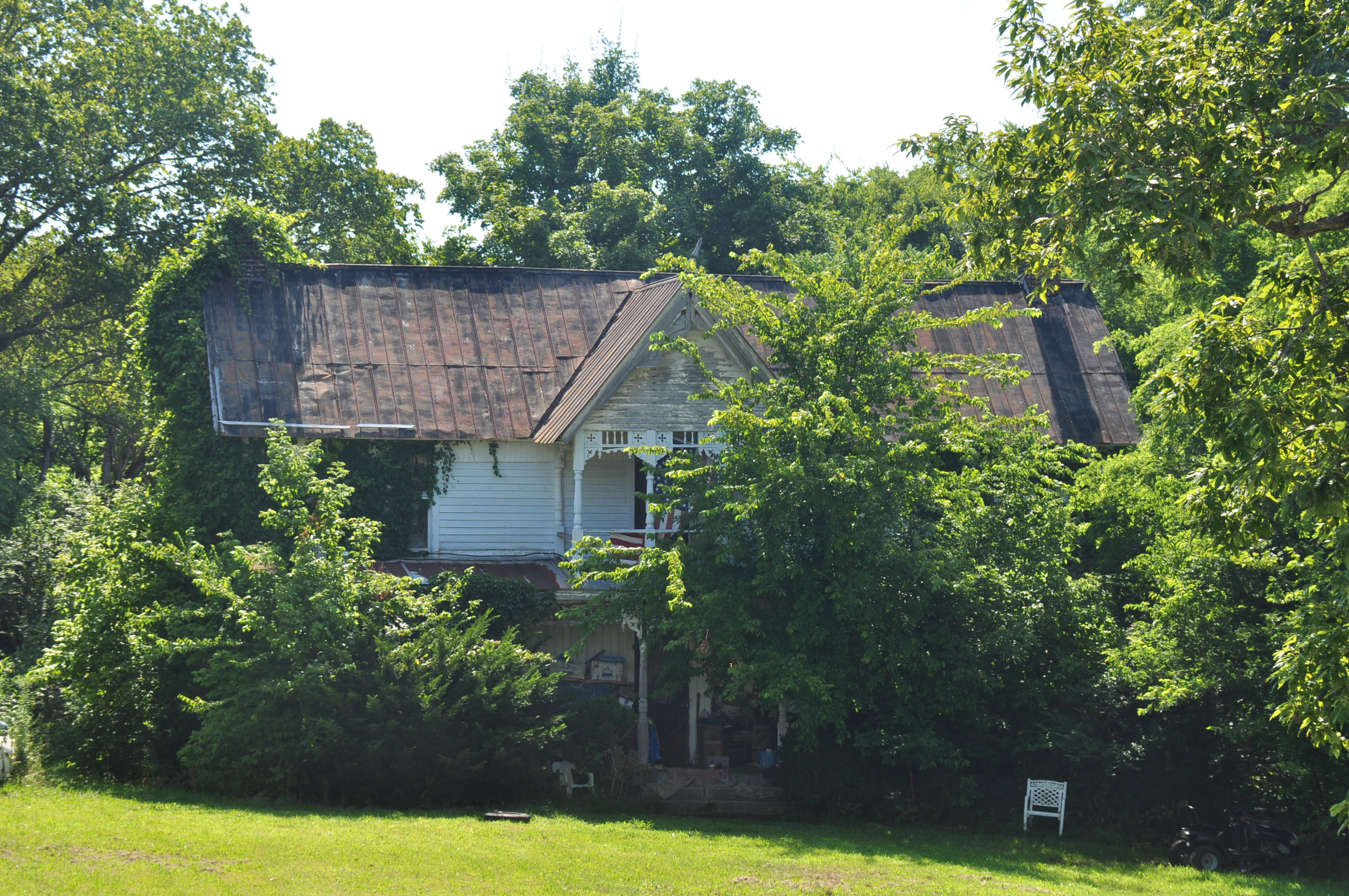
- James Scales House, July 2014.

- Location within Tennessee Location within the United States
- Location: US Alt. 31, Kirkland, Tennessee
- Coordinates: 35°48′18″N 86°39′42″W
- Area: 5.8 acres (2.3 ha)
- Built: c. 1885
- Architectural style: Stick/Eastlake, I-house; central passage plan
- MPS: Williamson County MRA
- NRHP reference No.: 88000350
- Added to NRHP: April 13, 1988

The James Scales House, built c. 1885 in Kirkland, Tennessee, United States, along with the William W. Johnson House, another Williamson County house, are notable as late 19th century central passage plan residences that "display period decoration at eaves and porch." It includes Stick/Eastlake, I-house, and central passage plan architecture.

It was listed on the National Register of Historic Places in 1988. When listed the property included one contributing building and three contributing structures on an area of 5.8 acres (2.3 ha).

== See also ==
- Joseph Scales House, Triune, Tennessee, also NRHP-listed in Williamson County
- Absalom Scales House, Eagleville, Tennessee, also NRHP-listed
