= Ben Johnson =

Ben, Benjamin or Benny Johnson may refer to:

== People ==
=== In sports ===
==== American football ====
- Ben Johnson (offensive tackle) (born 1980)
- Ben Johnson (tight end) (born 1994)
- Ben Johnson (American football coach) (born 1986)
- Benny Johnson (American football) (1948–1988)

==== Association football ====
- Ben Johnson (soccer, born 1977), American soccer player
- Ben Johnson (footballer, born 2000), English footballer

==== Other codes of football ====
- Ben Johnson (Australian footballer) (born 1981), Australian rules footballer
- Benjamin Johnson (rugby league), rugby league footballer of the 1910s

==== Baseball ====
- Ben Johnson (outfielder) (born 1981), American
- Ben Johnson (pitcher) (1931–2020), American

==== Sport of athletics ====
- Ben Johnson (Canadian sprinter) (born 1961), Canadian sprinter
- Ben Johnson (American sprinter) (1914–1992), American sprinter

==== Other sports ====
- Ben Johnson (basketball) (born 1980), American basketball coach
- Ben Johnson (cricketer) (born 1973), Australian cricketer
- Ben Johnson (field hockey) (born 2000), Irish field hockey player
- Ben Johnson (ice hockey) (born 1994), American professional ice hockey player and convicted sex offender
- Benjamin Johnson (cyclist) (born 1983), Australian cyclist

=== In the arts ===
- Ben Jonson (1572–1637), English poet and dramatist
- Ben Johnson (actor) (1918–1996), American actor
- Ben Johnson (artist) (born 1946), British painter
- Ben Johnson (musician) (born 1984), American musician, member of the band 100 Monkeys
- Ben Patrick Johnson (born 1969), American voice-over actor, author, and commentator/activist
- Benjamin Johnson (actor) (1665–1742), English actor
- Ben Johnson (songwriter), American songwriter and producer

=== In government ===
- Ben F. Johnson (1914–2006), American politician in Georgia and academic administrator
- Ben Johnson (Kentucky politician) (1858–1950), American lawyer
- Ben Johnson (Makah politician) (1939–2014), chairman of the Makah Tribal Council
- Benjamin Johnson (judge) (1784–1849), United States federal judge

=== Other people ===
- Ben Campbell Johnson (1932–2016), American minister and professor
- Benjamin F. Johnson (1818–1905), American Mormon pioneer
- Benjamin Newhall Johnson (1856–1923), American attorney and historian
- Benny Johnson (columnist) (born 1987), American political columnist and reporter

== Other uses ==
- Ben Johnson (film), a 2005 Indian Malayalam-language film by Anil C. Menon
- Ben Jonson (1815 ship), a British Westindiaman

== See also ==
- Ben Johnson House (disambiguation)
- Ben Johnston (disambiguation)
- Ben Jonson Journal, a Scottish journal on Ben Jonson
- Ben Jonson folios, the works of Ben Jonson
