= Joseph Scales House =

Historic house in Tennessee, United States

- Formerly listed on the U.S. National Register of Historic Places
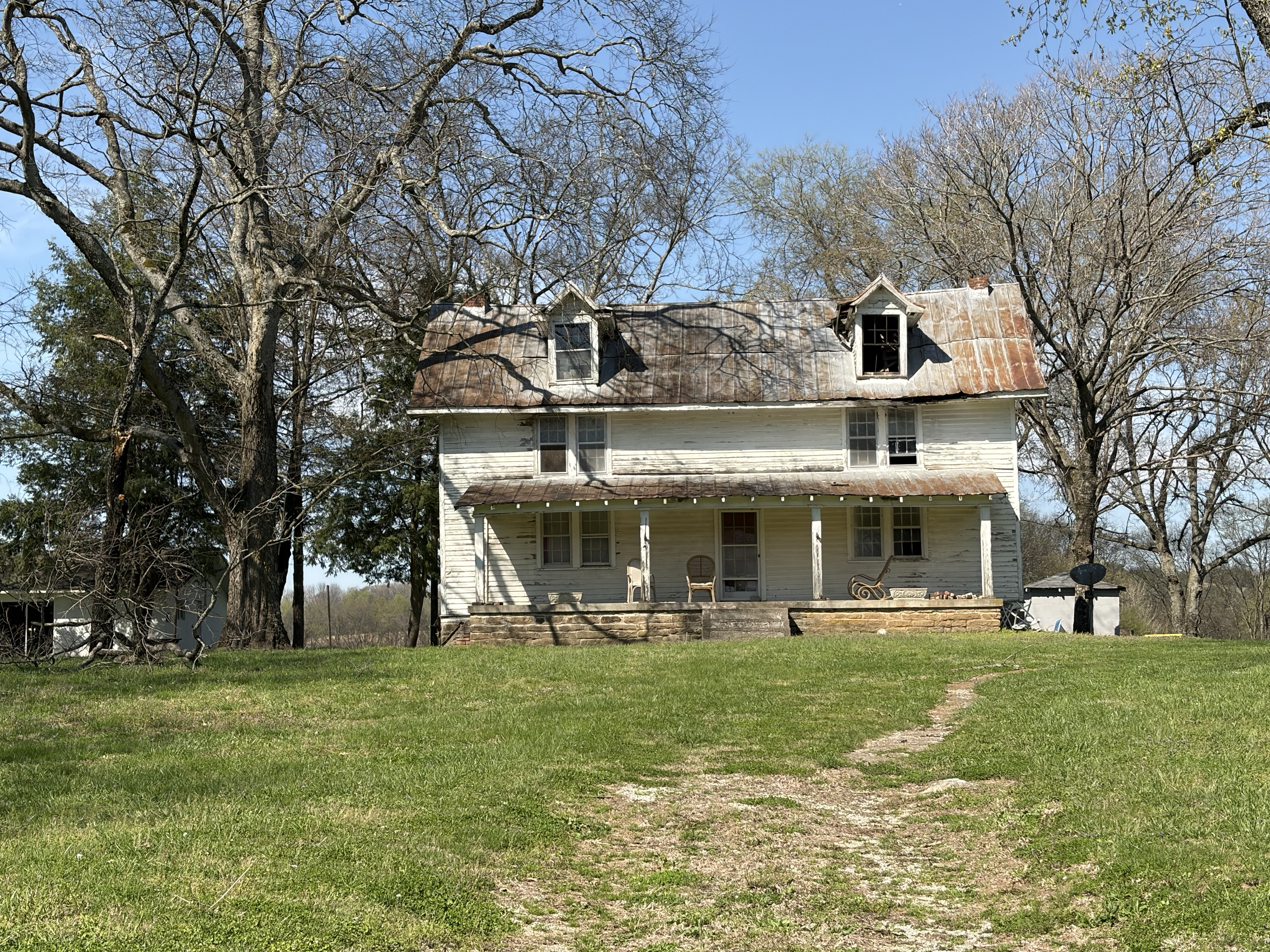
- The Scales House in 2026

- Location within Tennessee Location within the United States
- Location: Off Cox Rd. 1 mi. W of US Alt. 41, Triune, Tennessee
- Coordinates: 35°49′24″N 86°40′27″W
- Area: 92 acres (37 ha)
- Built: c. 1845, c. 1900 and c. 1925
- Architectural style: Greek Revival, Central passage plan
- MPS: Williamson County MRA
- NRHP reference No.: 88000351

Significant dates
- Added to NRHP: April 13, 1988
- Removed from NRHP: June 10, 2022

The Joseph Scales House is a property in Triune, Tennessee, United States, that was listed on the National Register of Historic Places in 1988, and delisted in 2022. It dates from c. 1845. It includes Central passage plan and other architecture. When listed the property included four contributing buildings, and three contributing structures on 92 acres (37 ha). The NRHP eligibility for the property was addressed in a 1988 study of Williamson County historical resources.

== See also ==
- James Scales House, Kirkland, Tennessee, also NRHP-listed
