= George Johnson House =

George Johnson House may refer to:

- George Johnson House (Calamus, Iowa), listed on the NRHP in Clinton County, Iowa
- George Johnson House (Lexington, Missouri), listed on the NRHP in Missouri
