= Benjamin Franklin Johnson II Homestead District =

Historic district in Arkansas, United States

- U.S. National Register of Historic Places
- U.S. Historic district
- Location within Arkansas Location within the United States
- Location: 3150 West Pear Lane, Fayetteville, Arkansas
- Coordinates: 36°0′47″N 94°12′27″W
- Area: 4.21 acres (1.70 ha)
- Built: 1925
- NRHP reference No.: 100003989
- Added to NRHP: May 29, 2019

The Benjamin Franklin Johnson II Homestead District encompasses a late 19th to early 20th century farmstead at 3150 West Pear Lane in Fayetteville, Arkansas. The district's principal built features are the 1925 Craftsman style house of Benjamin Franklin Johnson II, and the 1933 Johnson Barn built by his son, which is separately listed on the National Register. Additional features of the district include foundational remains of farm outbuildings, a stone wall and dam, and the remains of the family orchard. The complex is a comparatively well-preserved example of a period farm complex.

The district was listed on the National Register of Historic Places in 2019.

== See also ==
- National Register of Historic Places listings in Washington County, Arkansas
