= Johnson Barn =

Johnson Barn may refer to:

in the United States

(by state)

- Johnson Barn (Fayetteville, Arkansas) listed on the National Register of Historic Places in Washington County, Arkansas
- Louis Johnson Barn, Richfield, Idaho, listed on the National Register of Historic Places in Lincoln County, Idaho
- Thomas Johnson Polygonal Barn, Wellman, Iowa, listed on the National Register of Historic Places in Washington County, Idaho
- Johnson Barn (Mobridge, South Dakota), listed on the National Register of Historic Places in Walworth County, South Dakota
