= Johnson-Wolfe Farm =

Historic house in Maryland, United States

- U.S. National Register of Historic Places
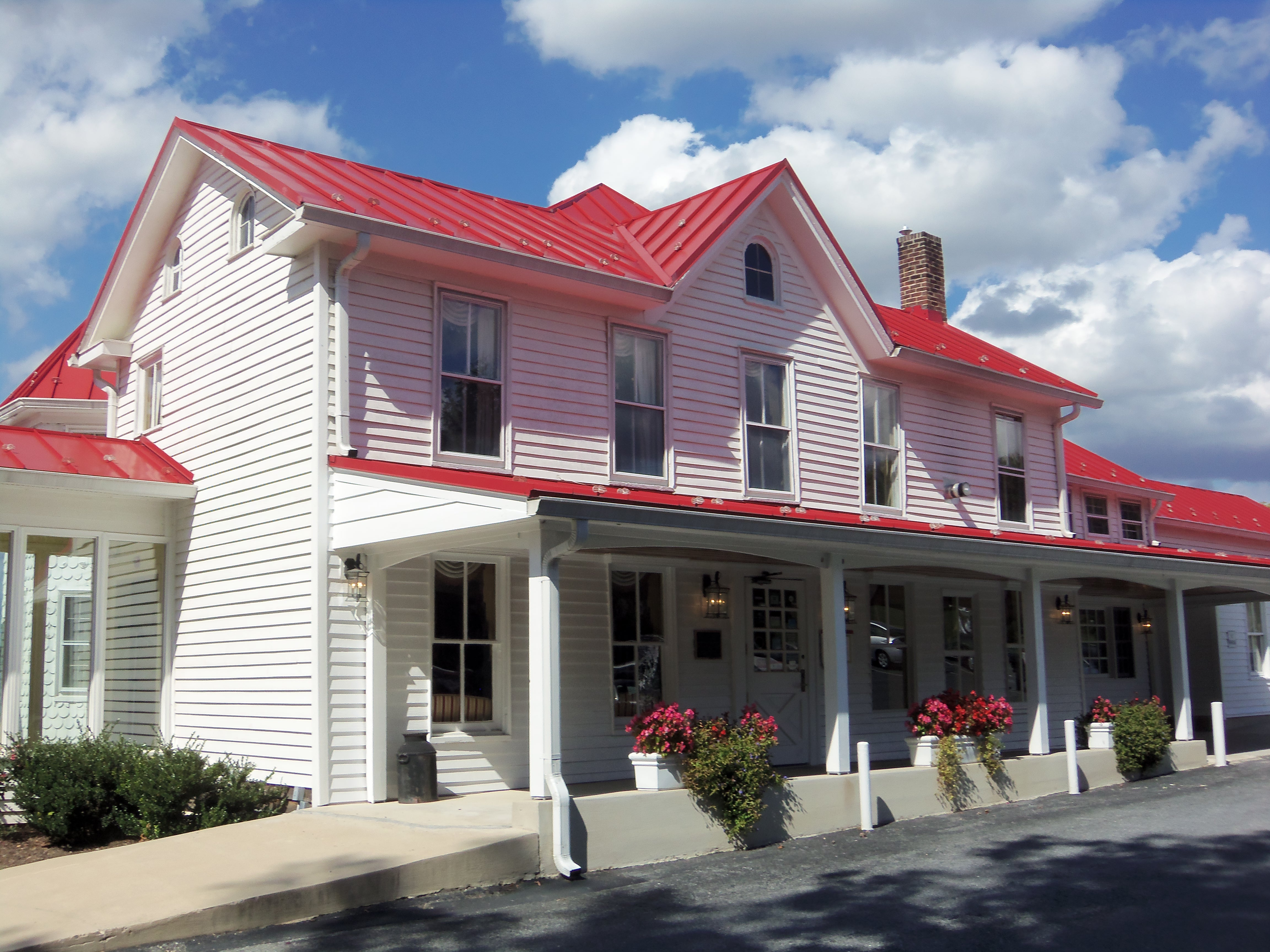

- Location within Maryland Location within the United States
- Location: 23900 Old Hundred Rd., Comus, Maryland
- Coordinates: 39°14′50″N 77°21′1″W
- Area: 5.3 acres (2.1 ha)
- Architectural style: Late Victorian
- NRHP reference No.: 03001114
- Added to NRHP: November 8, 2003

Johnson-Wolfe Farm, more commonly known as the Comus Inn, is a historic set of four buildings located at Comus, Montgomery County, Maryland. The complex includes a ca. 1862 vernacular dwelling known as the Comus Inn, smokehouse, barn, and a ca. 1936 poultry house.

It was listed on the National Register of Historic Places in 2003.
