= Johnson Farm (Kipling, North Carolina) =

Historic farm in North Carolina, United States

- U.S. National Register of Historic Places
- U.S. Historic district
- Location within North Carolina Location within the United States
- Location: 2095 Kipling Rd. (south side SR 1403, .2 miles east of SR 1425), near Kipling, North Carolina
- Coordinates: 35°29′17″N 78°51′09″W
- Area: 350 acres (140 ha)
- Built: 1918
- Built by: Ashworth and Draughn
- Architectural style: Colonial Revival
- NRHP reference No.: 10000207
- Added to NRHP: April 15, 2010

Johnson Farm is a historic home and farm complex and national historic district located near Kipling, Harnett County, North Carolina. It encompasses 21 contributing buildings, 2 contributing sites, and 3 contributing structures on a rural farm complex. The main house was built in 1918, and is a two-story, double pile, Southern Colonial frame dwelling. It features a monumental, two-story, front-gabled portico with a one-story wraparound porch. Also on the property are two tenant houses, two country stores, and a wide variety of agricultural outbuildings.

It was listed on the National Register of Historic Places in 2010.
