= Abner C. Johnson House =

- U.S. National Register of Historic Places
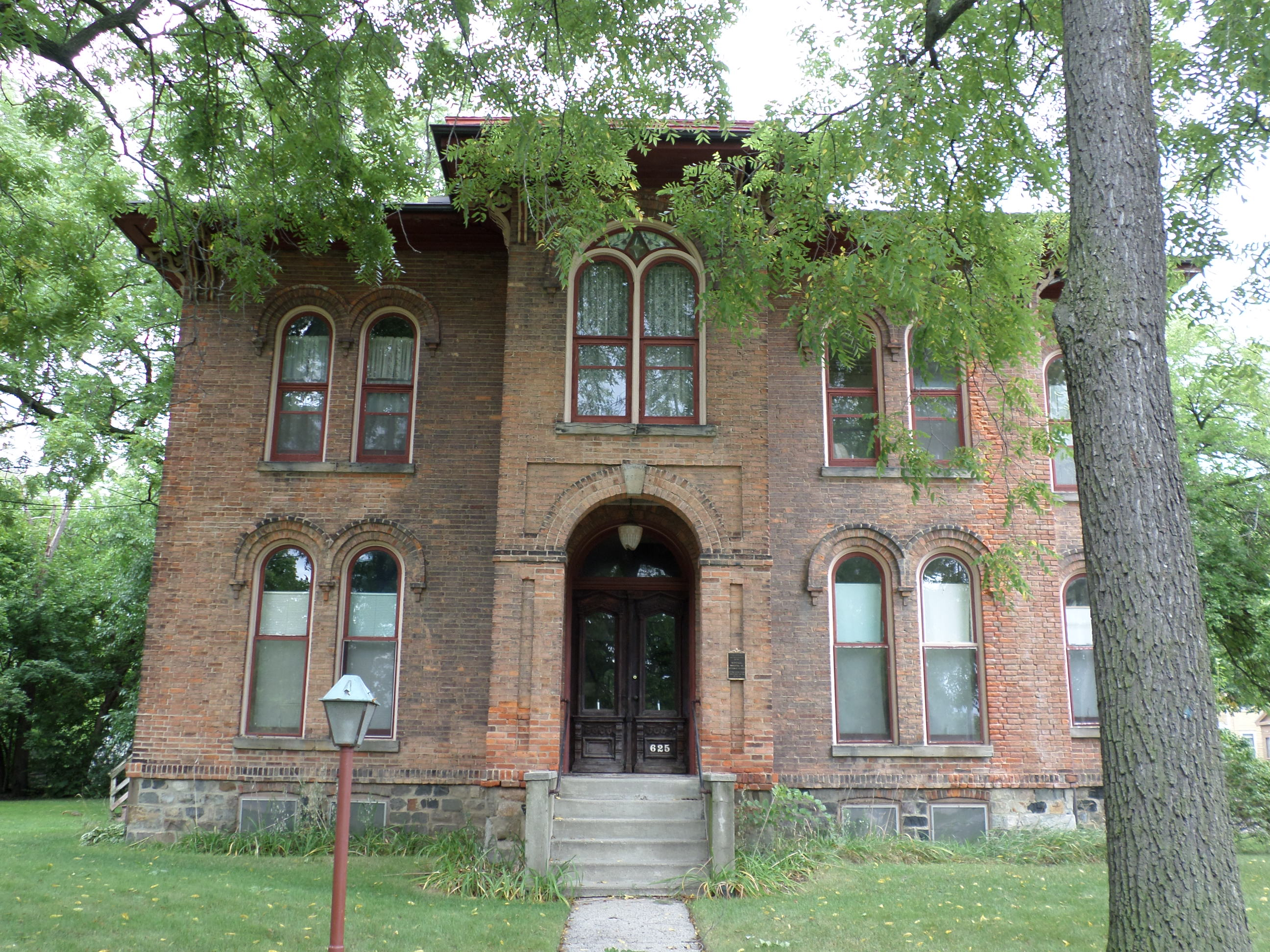

- Location within Michigan Location within the United States
- Interactive map
- Location: 625 East St., Flint, Michigan
- Coordinates: 43°01′02″N 83°40′58″W
- Area: less than one acre
- Built: 1873
- Architectural style: Italianate
- NRHP reference No.: 87000183
- Added to NRHP: February 19, 1987

The Abner C. Johnson House is a single family home located at 625 East Street in, Flint, Michigan. It was listed on the National Register of Historic Places in 1987.

== History ==
Abner C. Johnson was born in Canajoharie, New York in 1821. His family moved to Bloomfield, Michigan in 1828, and in 1836 relocated to Independence Township. In 1839, Abner moved out and purchased land in Mundy Township in Genesee County and began a successful farm. He also began studying law with George W. Wisner, and became one of the first attorneys in Genesee County. Johnson married Amanda Pearsall in 1845; the couple had three children. Soon, Johnson began a partnership with Wisner's brother Moses Wisner (later the governor of Michigan), buying and selling timberland. The partners made a fortune during the area's timber boom.

Johnson remained living on his farm, but by the 1860s he was spending more and more time in Flint pursuing both legal and business opportunities. Finally, in 1873, he constructed this house in Flint and moved his family there. Abner and Amanda Johnson stayed in the house until their deaths, after which their eldest son Charles inherited the property. The younger Johnson, born in 1847, was also a lawyer, and founded one of the largest law firms in Flint. He also lived in the house until his death. After that, family members of Charles Johnson's brothers, Ransom and James, stayed in the house until 1941. After that, the Johnson family retained ownership, but subdivided the house into apartments. In 1986, new owners purchase the house and converted it back to a single family home.

== Description ==
The Abner C. Johnson House is a The two-story wood-framed Italianate house clad in brown brick. The original section is rectangular, measuring thirty-six feet by twenty-eight feet. It sits on a high basement made of multicolored dressed fieldstone. It has a hipped roof with wide eaves and paired corner brackets; a fourteen by eight foot clapboard-covered belvedere tops the building.

The front facade of the house is three bays wide with a projecting center bay containing arches through which the decoratively carved double entry doors can be reached. On the second floor are a pair of rounded arch windows in a single arched opening. Pairs of rounded arch, one-over-one double hung windows are in each of the other bays on both floors. A single-story, hip roof, clapboard clad addition is at the rear of the building.
