= Johnson-Wolff House =

Historic house in Florida, United States

- U.S. National Register of Historic Places
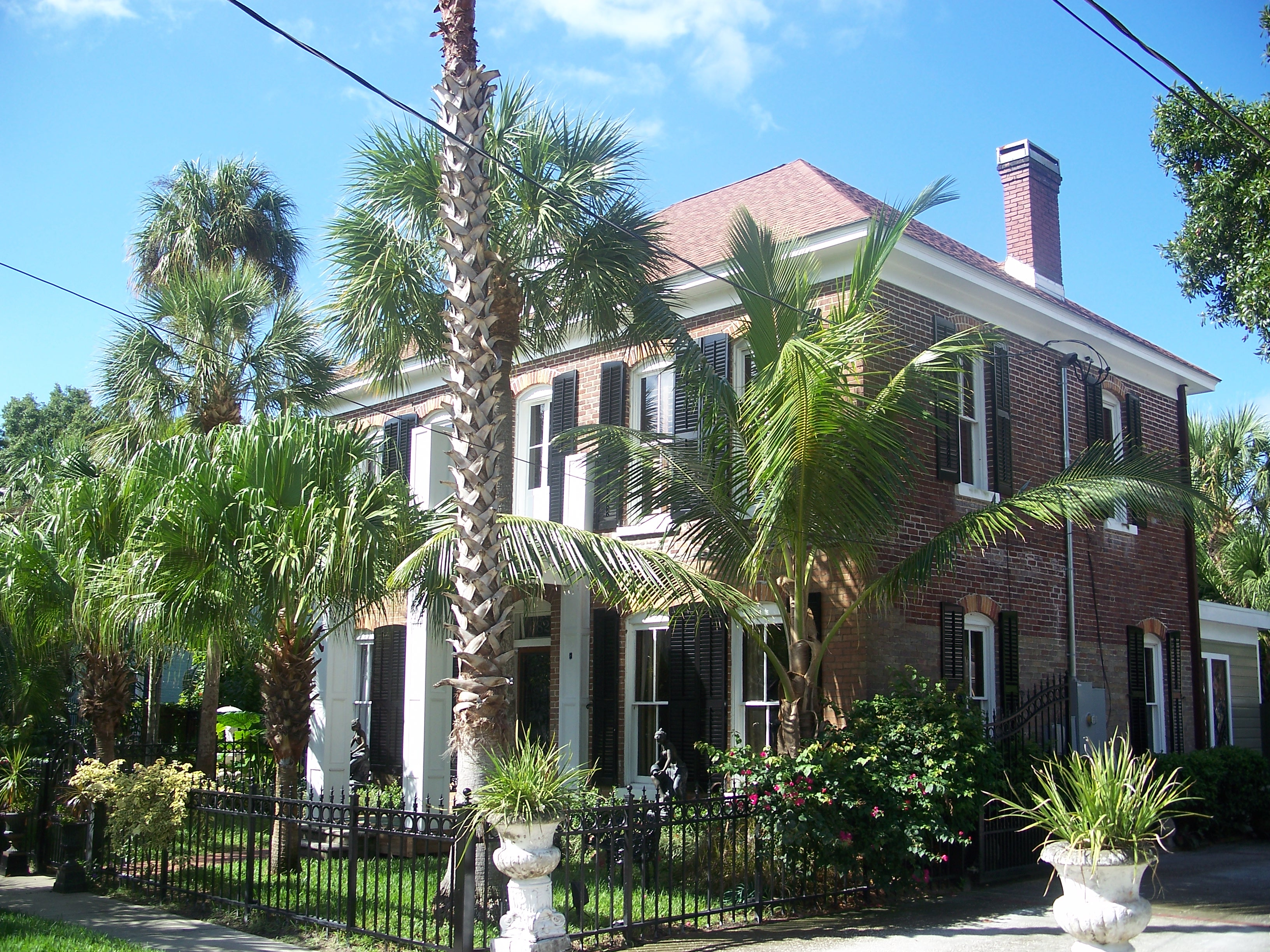

- Location within Florida Location within the United States
- Location: 6823 S. DeSoto St., Tampa, Florida
- Coordinates: 27°51′59″N 82°31′34″W
- Area: less than one acre
- Architectural style: Georgian
- NRHP reference No.: 74000634
- Added to NRHP: July 24, 1974

The Johnson-Wolff House is a historic home in Tampa, Florida. It is located at 6823 South DeSoto Street. It was first built around 1885 by the Plant Steamship Company. Captain Henry Johnson bought it in 1883 and renovated and expanded it. His daughter, Ethel Wolff later owned it, which is where it got its name.

On July 24, 1974, it was added to the U.S. National Register of Historic Places.
