= Johnson Home Farm =

Former historic house in Delaware, US

- U.S. National Register of Historic Places
- Location within Delaware Location within the United States
- Location: 166 Cedar Swamp Road, near Taylor's Bridge, Delaware
- Coordinates: 39°24′42″N 75°34′59″W
- Area: 1 acre (0.40 ha)
- Built: 1790
- Architectural style: Federal
- MPS: Dwellings of the Rural Elite in Central Delaware MPS
- NRHP reference No.: 92001133
- Added to NRHP: September 11, 1992

Johnson Home Farm was a historic home located near Taylor's Bridge at New Castle County, Delaware, United States. It was built about 1790, and was a two-story, five-bay, gable-roof, post-and-plank building with interior brick chimneys at each gable end. It has a center-passage plan with overall dimensions of 39 feet wide by 22 feet deep. A two-story, wood-frame kitchen wing was added in the mid-19th century. It is in the Federal style.

It was listed on the National Register of Historic Places in 1992, and demolished before 2002.
