= Dan Johnson Farmstead =

- U.S. National Register of Historic Places
- U.S. Historic district
- Location within Vermont Location within the United States
- Location: Jct. of US 2 and Johnson Ln., Williston, Vermont
- Coordinates: 44°26′8″N 73°3′31″W
- Area: 210 acres (85 ha)
- Built: 1787
- Architectural style: Queen Anne
- MPS: Agricultural Resources of Vermont MPS
- NRHP reference No.: 93001178
- Added to NRHP: November 4, 1993

The Dan Johnson Farmstead is a historic farm property on United States Route 2 in Williston, Vermont. It was first developed in 1787 by Dan Johnson, one of Williston's first settlers, and has remained in his family since that time. The property includes three 19th-century houses and a large barn complex, as well as more than 200 acres (81 ha) of land crossed by US 2 and Interstate 89. It was listed on the National Register of Historic Places in 1993.

== Description and history ==
The Dan Johnson Farmstead is located in eastern Williston, with the farm building complex and associated houses located on or near US Route 2 east of Johnson Lane. The farm property consists of about 210 acres (85 ha), of which the majority is located south of Interstate 89 and east of South Road. The southern portion is used mainly for hay production, with the upland portions gradually reverting to forest. The area north of I-89 is used either for cultivation or as pastureland for dairy cattle. The main building complex is on the north side of US 2, and consists of a c. 1840 Greek Revival farmhouse, a series of connected barns and silos, and a toolshed. On the east side of Johnson Lane, near I-89, stands a c. 1898 farmhouse with Queen Anne features, and a third farmhouse, originally built to house tenant workers, stands at the eastern end of the farm fields on the south side of US 2.

The farm property was settled in 1787 by Dan Johnson, who was, along with members of the state's prominent Chittenden family, one of Williston's first proprietors. The Greek Revival farmhouse was probably built by Johnson's son Nathan, as were some of the surviving barns. Nathan and later his son John expanded the dairy aspect of the farm operation. The property was expanded in the 1920s by the acquisition of the Darling farm to the south, which included the c. 1898 farmhouse on Johnson Lane. I-89 was built through the property beginning in the late 1950s, complicating farm operations, since cattle could readily be driven to the southern tract. As of the farm's listing on the National Register in 1993, it was still owned by Johnson descendants.

== See also ==
- National Register of Historic Places listings in Chittenden County, Vermont
