= Johnson Hall (disambiguation) =

Johnson Hall may refer to:

- Johnson Hall State Historic Site, a U.S. National Historic Landmark in Johnstown, New York
- Johnson Hall (Eugene, Oregon), listed on the NRHP in Lane County, Oregon
- Johnson Hall-Deseret Mercantile Building, Grantsville, Utah, listed on the NRHP in Tooele County, Utah
- Johnson Hall (Salem)
