= C. L. Johnson House =

Historic blockhouse in Florida, United States

- U.S. National Register of Historic Places
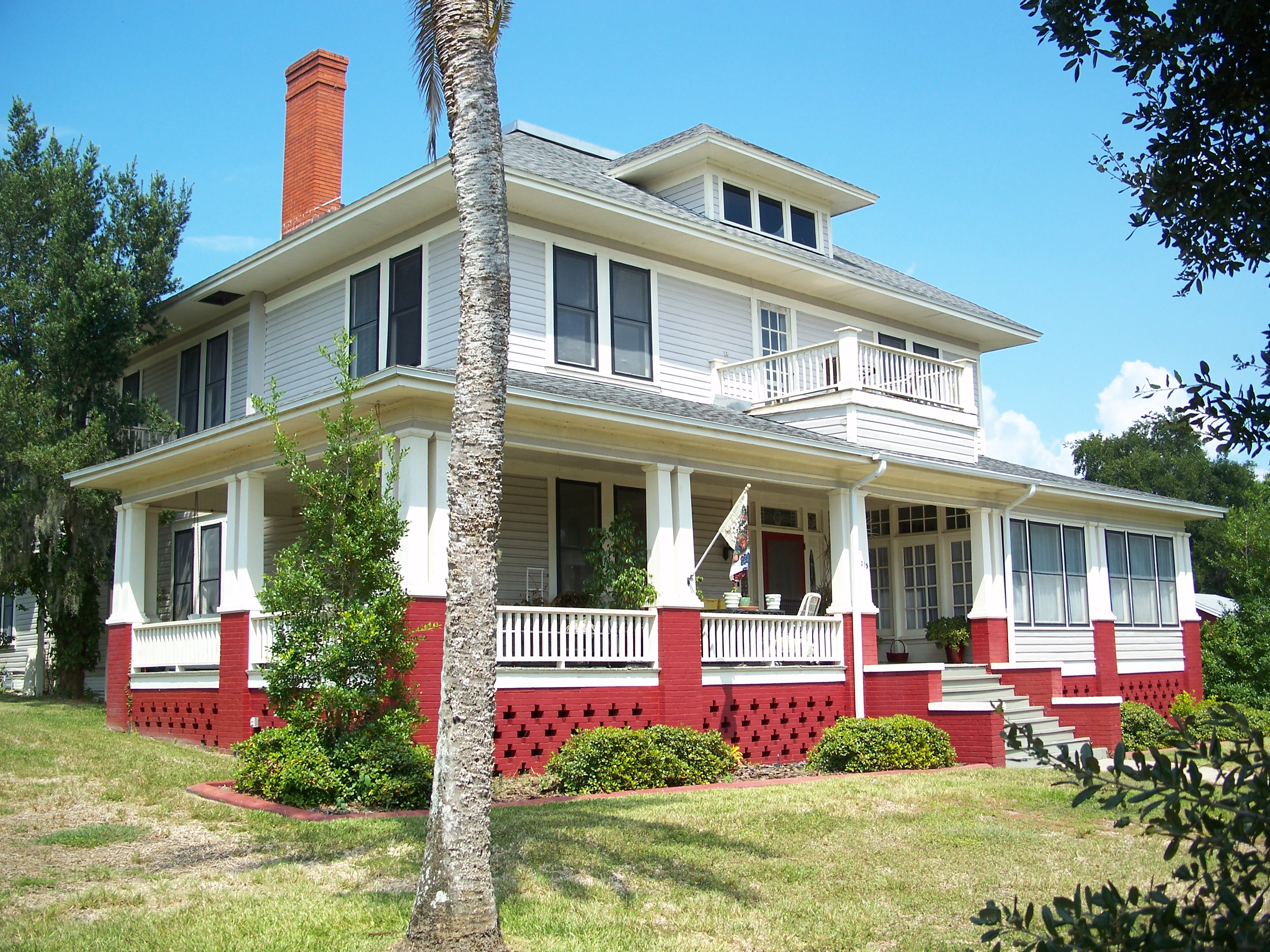

- Location within Florida Location within the United States
- Location: Lake Wales, Florida
- Coordinates: 27°54′20″N 81°35′5″W
- Area: 1 acre (0.40 ha)
- Built: 1914
- Architect: J. J. Johnson
- Architectural style: Colonial Revival
- NRHP reference No.: 89001481
- Added to NRHP: 21 September 1989

The C. L. Johnson House is a historic house located at 315 East Sessoms Avenue in Lake Wales, Florida. It is locally significant as the former home of one of the four founders of the city, and also as a fine example of a Colonial Revival style house which has experienced minimal alterations.

== Description and history ==
It is a two-story Colonial Revival house with a hipped roof. It has a continuous brick foundation that is 5–6 feet above grade, and features a distinctive cross shape design motif; heart pine, simple drop, horizontal board siding; and a deck hipped roof covered with asbestos tile.

It was added to the National Register of Historic Places on September 21, 1989.
