= Moss–Johnson Farm =

Historic farm in North Carolina, United States

- U.S. National Register of Historic Places
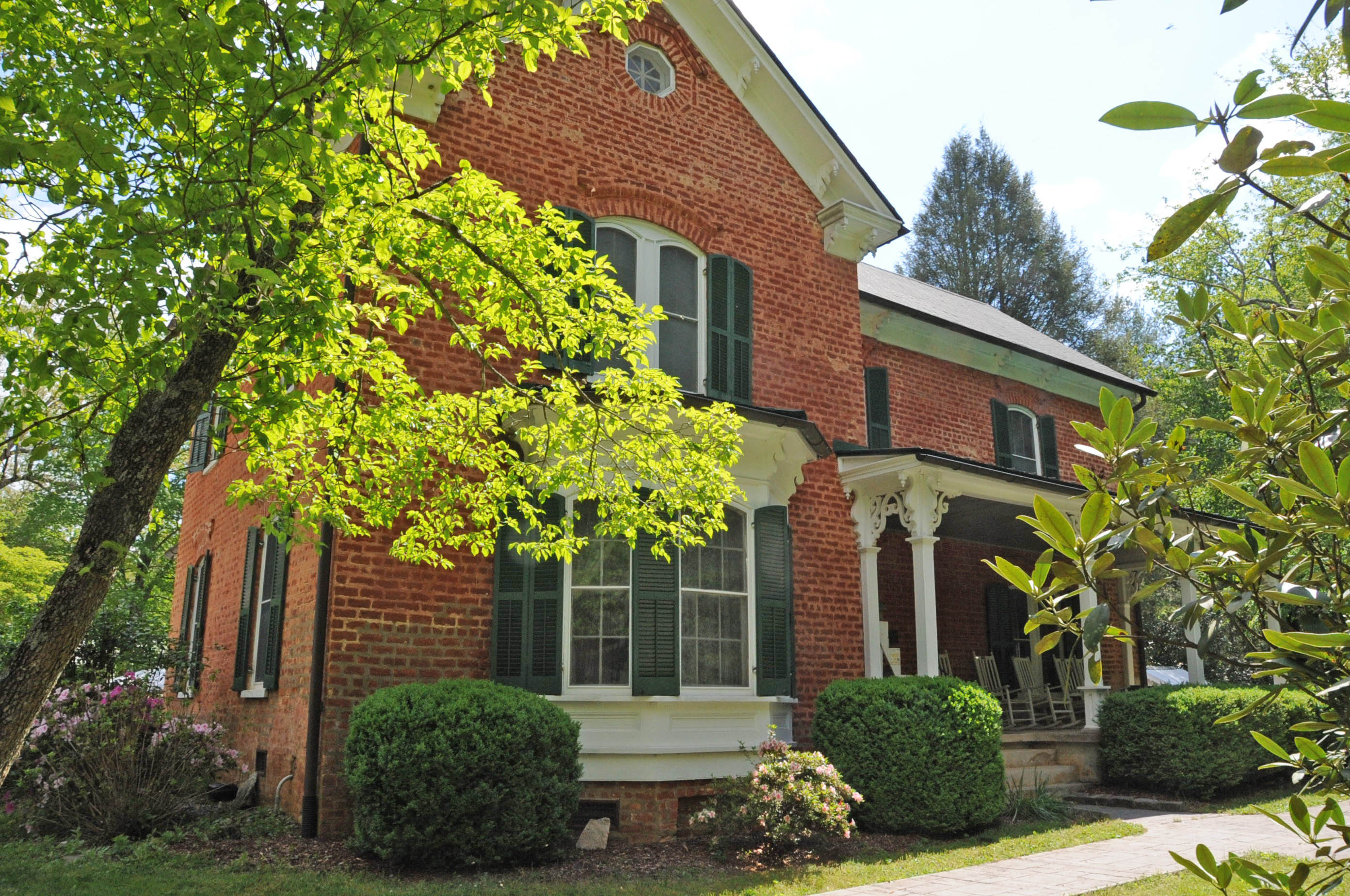

- Location within North Carolina Location within the United States
- Location: 3346 Haywood Rd., near Hendersonville, North Carolina, United States
- Coordinates: 35°21′34″N 82°30′32″W
- Area: 25 acres (10 ha)
- Built: 1874-1880
- Built by: Barnett, Riley
- NRHP reference No.: 87000021
- Added to NRHP: February 10, 1987

Moss–Johnson Farm, also known as the Johnson Farm, is a historic farm complex located near Hendersonville, Henderson County, North Carolina, United States. The farmhouse was built between 1874 and 1880, and is a rectangular brick dwelling measuring 50 feet by 28 feet. Also on the property are the contributing clapboard summer house (1920), a granary and smokehouse (1880), a well, a barn (1923), a small dwelling (1933), and a hen house and pig barn. After 1970 the property was donated in several gifts to the Henderson County Board of Education for use as a farm museum.

It was listed on the National Register of Historic Places in 1987.
