= Johnson House (518 East 8th Street, Little Rock, Arkansas) =

Historic house in Arkansas, United States

- U.S. National Register of Historic Places
- U.S. Historic district – Contributing property
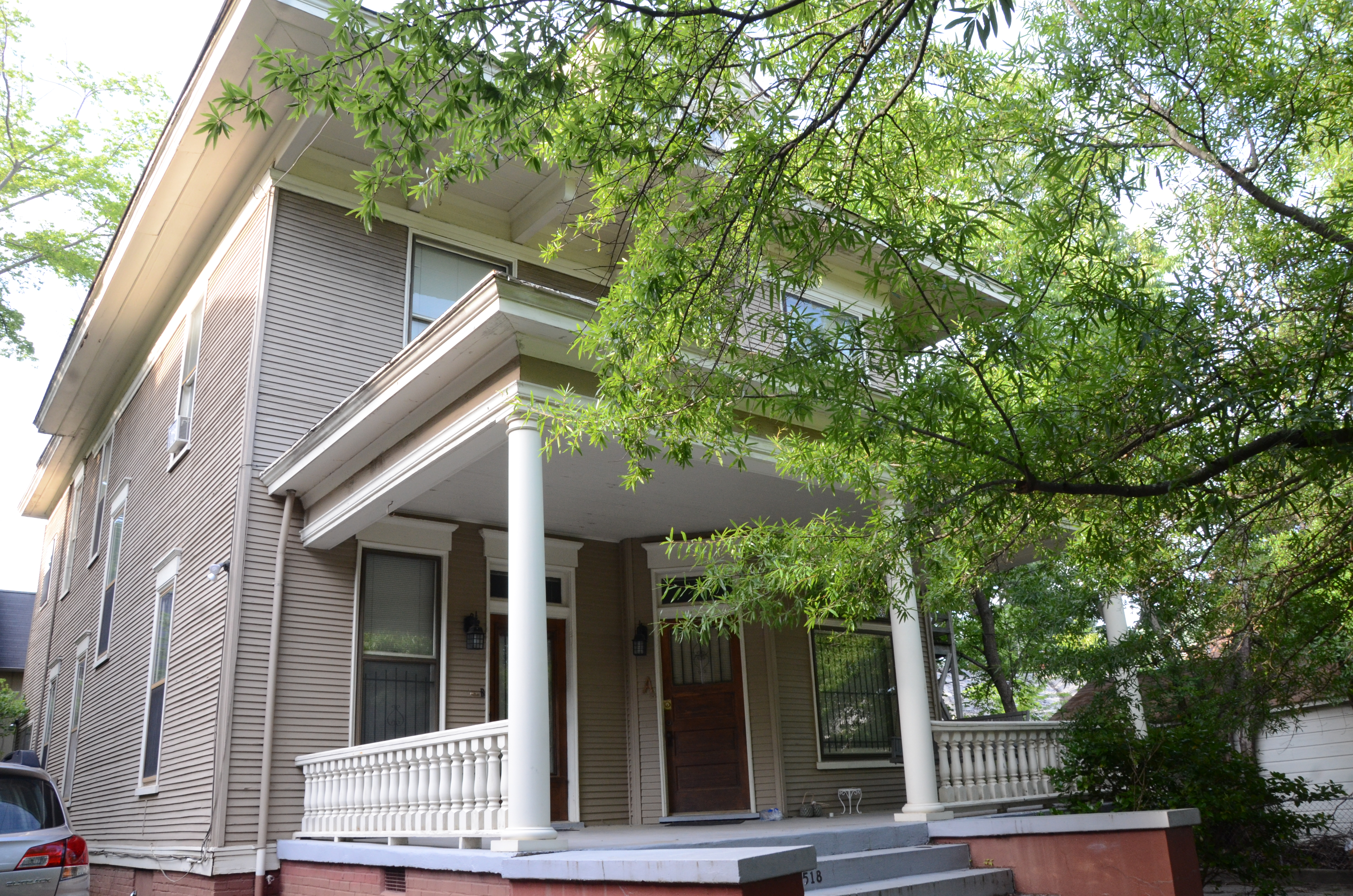

- Location within Arkansas Location within the United States
- Location: 518 E. 8th St., Little Rock, Arkansas
- Coordinates: 34°44′26″N 92°15′56″W
- Area: less than one acre
- Built: 1900
- Architect: Charles L. Thompson
- Architectural style: Colonial Revival
- Part of: MacArthur Park Historic District (ID77000269)
- MPS: Thompson, Charles L., Design Collection TR
- NRHP reference No.: 82000904

Significant dates
- Added to NRHP: December 22, 1982
- Designated CP: July 25, 1977

The Johnson House is a historic house at 518 East 8th Street in Little Rock, Arkansas. It is a 2 1/2-story American Foursquare style house, with a flared hip roof and weatherboard siding. Its front facade is covered by a single-story porch, supported by Tuscan columns, and the main roof eave features decorative brackets. A two-story polygonal bay projects on the right side of the front facade. Built about 1900, it is one of a group of three similar rental houses on the street by Charles L. Thompson, a noted Arkansas architect.

The house was listed on the National Register of Historic Places in 1982.

== See also ==
- Johnson House (514 East 8th Street, Little Rock, Arkansas)
- Johnson House (516 East 8th Street, Little Rock, Arkansas)
- National Register of Historic Places listings in Little Rock, Arkansas
