= Johnson Barn (Fayetteville, Arkansas) =

Historic barn in rural Arkansas

- U.S. National Register of Historic Places
- U.S. Historic district – Contributing property
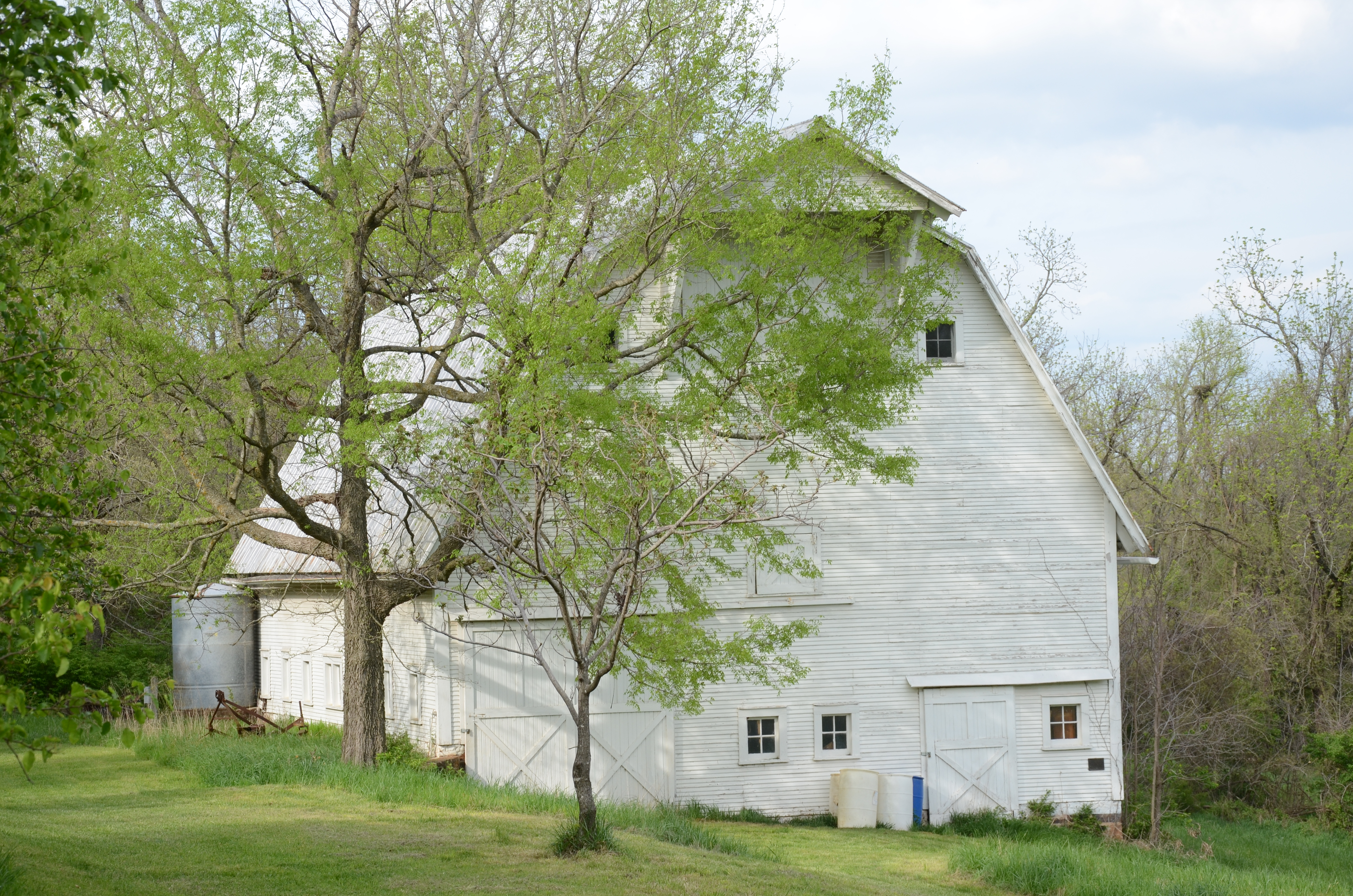

- Location within Arkansas Location within the United States
- Nearest city: Fayetteville, Arkansas
- Coordinates: 36°0′55″N 94°12′21″W
- Area: Less than one acre
- Architect: Johnson, Ben F., III
- Architectural style: Gambrel Type Barn
- Part of: Benjamin Franklin Johnson II Homestead District (ID100003989)
- NRHP reference No.: 90000896

Significant dates
- Added to NRHP: June 21, 1990
- Designated CP: May 29, 2019

The Johnson Barn is a historic barn in rural Washington County, Arkansas, southwest of the city of Fayetteville. It is located in an agricultural area north of County Road 202 and west of Arkansas Highway 265 (Cato Springs Road). The barn was designed by Benjamin F. Johnson III, who had studied landscape architecture at Harvard University, and was designed after studying barns throughout the region to accumulate best practices in barn design into a single structure. The barn was built in 1933 and used by the family until the 1970s. Notable features include its comparatively large size, hinged loft doors, separate cattle entrances, truss-supported roof, hay hood, and lack of interior supports.

The barn was listed on the National Register of Historic Places in 1990.

== See also ==
- National Register of Historic Places listings in Washington County, Arkansas
