= Iverson-Johnson House =

Historic house in Wisconsin, United States

- U.S. National Register of Historic Places
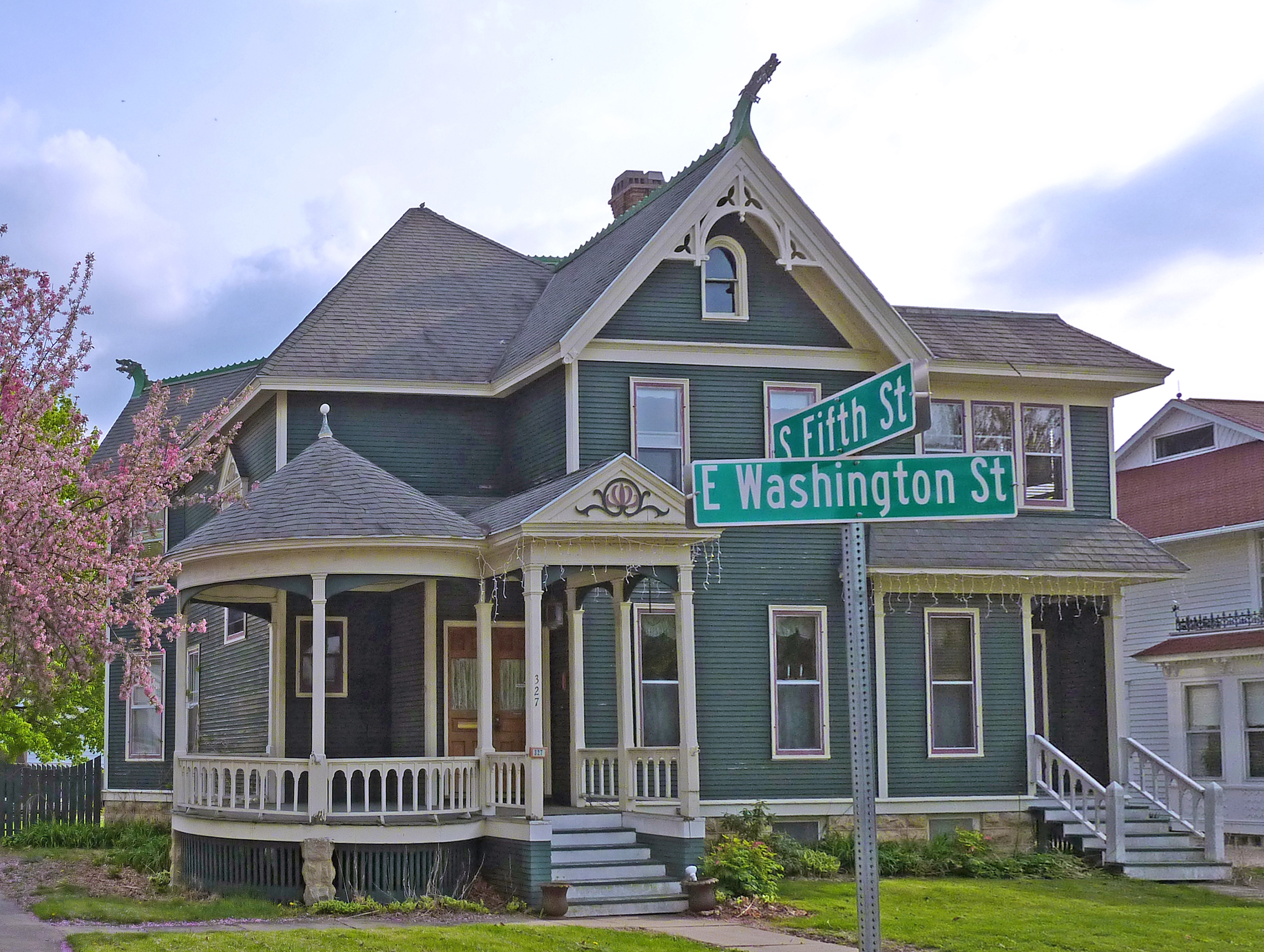
- Iverson-Johnson House
- Location: 327 E. Washington St., Stoughton, Wisconsin
- Coordinates: 42°55′02″N 89°13′00″W
- Area: less than one acre
- Built: 1898
- Architect: A. E. Ovren
- Architectural style: Queen Anne
- NRHP reference No.: 87002501
- Added to NRHP: January 21, 1988

The Iverson-Johnson House is a well-preserved historic house with unusual dragon-head decorations, built in 1898 in Stoughton, Wisconsin. It was listed on the National Register of Historic Places in 1988 and on the State Register of Historic Places the following year.

Dr. Michael Iverson was born near Bergen, Norway in 1861. He studied medicine in Norway and Germany, then immigrated to America in 1891. In 1894 he established a practice in the heavily Norwegian-American community of Stoughton. By 1898 he was successful enough to build a large, stylish new home at 327 E. Washington.

The house was built by A.E. Ovran, two stories tall, built of wood with a hip roof and four gables. Jutting up from each gable peak is a narrow carved dragon head, said to be considered good luck by Norwegians at that time. Beneath the dragon heads, the gable ends are decorated with bargeboards and carved crosspieces. One window on the house is different - supposedly from the first church to use glass windows in Norway - inscribed "1700." At one corner of the building is a round greenhouse. At the side entrance is a speaking tube through which patients could talk with Dr. Iverson in his bedroom at night, before the arrival of the telephone. Inside, the rooms originally included a parlor, a music room, the doctor's office, and a maid's room.

Iverson and his family lived in the house for seven years. In 1904 he established the Scandinavian-American Hospital in Stoughton, which eventually became Stoughton Community Hospital. It wasn't financially successful at first and he moved his family to the hospital in 1905, both to save money and for convenience.

Peter Norman Johnson bought the house from Iverson in 1905. Johnson was another Norwegian, who arrived in 1849 and prospered in farming. He retired to the Iverson-Johnson house, and his daughter was still living there in 1988 when it was added to the NRHP.
