= William W. Johnson House =

Historic house in Tennessee, United States

- U.S. National Register of Historic Places
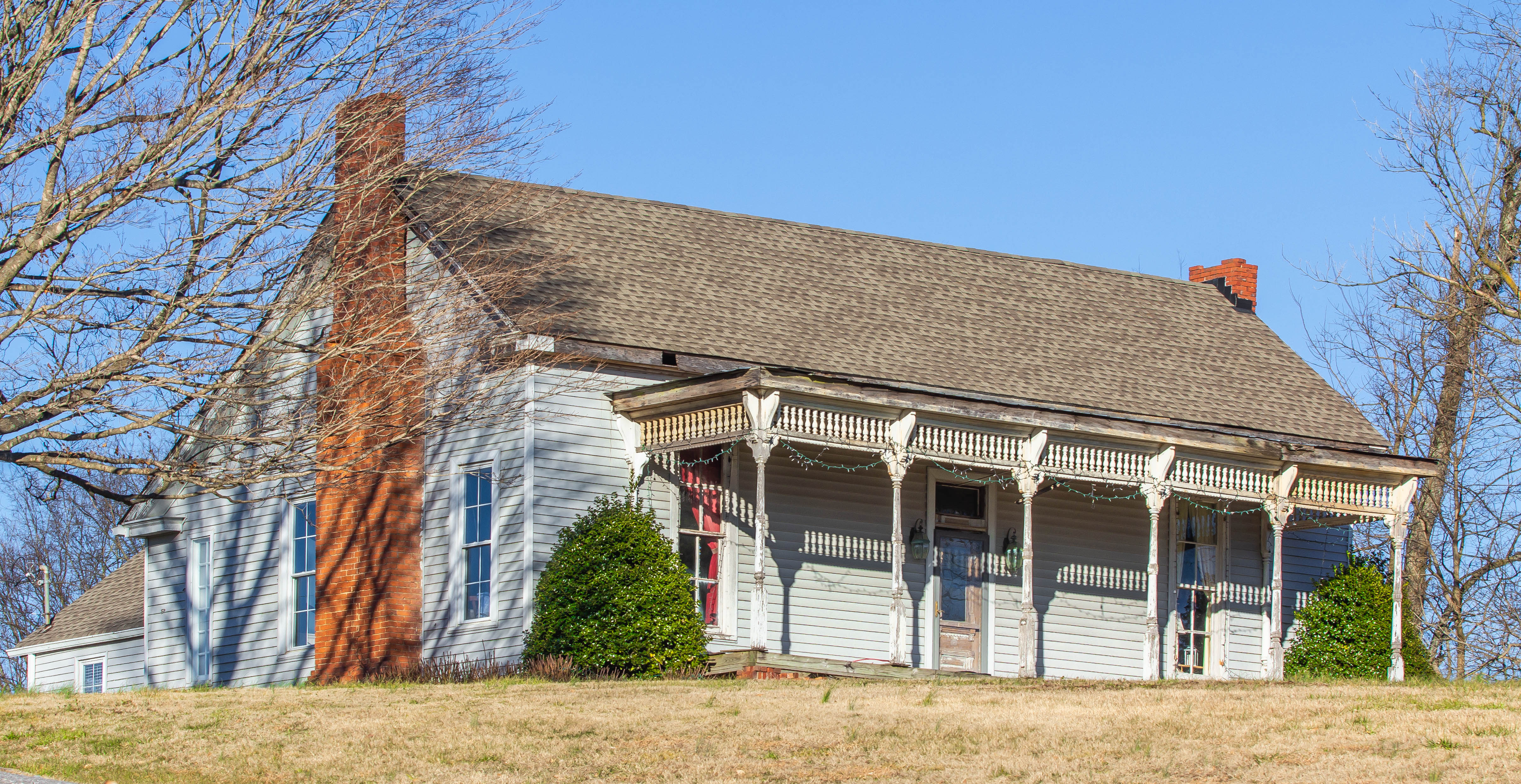
- William W. Johnson House

- Location within Tennessee Location within the United States
- Location: Farm Ln. 1/2 mi. S of Clovercroft Rd. 1/2 mi. E of Pleasant Hill Rd., Franklin, Tennessee
- Coordinates: 35°55′43″N 86°42′35″W
- Area: 1.5 acres (0.61 ha)
- Built: c. 1820, c. 1840 and c. 1875
- Architectural style: I-house; Central passage plan
- MPS: Williamson County MRA
- NRHP reference No.: 88000314
- Added to NRHP: April 13, 1988

The William W. Johnson House in Franklin, Tennessee, along with the James Scales House, another Williamson County house, are notable as late 19th century central passage plan residences that "display period decoration at eaves and porch." It has been described as I-house architecture.

The 1.5-acre (0.61 ha) property, including two contributing buildings and two contributing structures, was listed on the National Register of Historic Places in 1988.

Dates of historic significance for the property include c.1820, c.1840, and c.1875.
