= John Johnson House (Leighton, Alabama) =

Historic house in Alabama, United States

- U.S. National Register of Historic Places
- Alabama Register of Landmarks and Heritage
- Location within Alabama Location within the United States
- Nearest city: Leighton, Alabama
- Coordinates: 34°46′4″N 87°27′15″W
- Area: 80 acres (32 ha)
- Built: c.1825
- Architectural style: Tidewater Cottage
- MPS: Tidewater Cottages in the Tennessee Valley TR
- NRHP reference No.: 86001537

Significant dates
- Added to NRHP: July 9, 1986
- Designated ARLH: April 16, 1985

The John Johnson House also known as The Green Onion is a historic residence near Leighton, Alabama, US. The house was built in the late 1820s by John Johnson, a settler from Mecklenburg County, Virginia, who lived in Middle Tennessee before coming to North Alabama. His son-in-law, Lewis Dillahunty, was one of the earliest settlers in the western Tennessee Valley, and convinced Johnson to move to the area. Johnson died in the early 1840s, and his son sold the house and 80 acres (32 ha) out of the family. The house has been long occupied by tenant farmers, and is now part of the Leonard Preuitt estate.

The house is a 1 1/2-story Tidewater cottage. A single chimney sits in each gable end. The foundation rises 4 feet (1.2 m) above the ground and is laid in common bond and Flemish bond. The façade is three bays wide, with each door and window topped with a jack arch. Inside, a central hall separates two large rooms on each floor. A staircase in the hall connects the two floors.

The house was listed on the Alabama Register of Landmarks and Heritage in 1985 and the National Register of Historic Places in 1986.
