= William H. Johnson House =

Historic house in New Jersey, United States

- U.S. National Register of Historic Places
- New Jersey Register of Historic Places
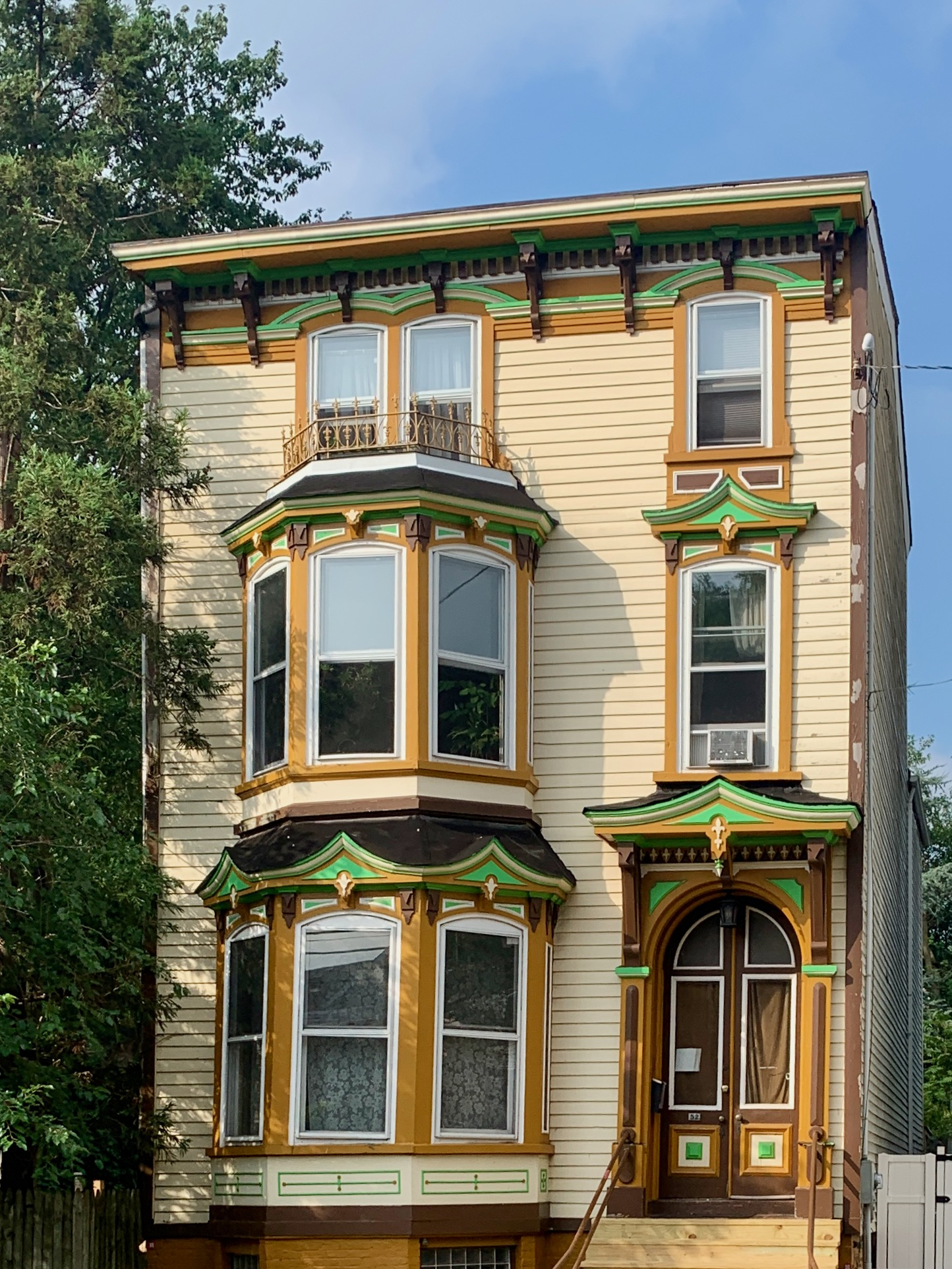
- William H. Johnson House in 2020

- Location within Middlesex County, New Jersey Location within New Jersey Location within the United States
- Location: 52 Welton Street, New Brunswick, New Jersey
- Coordinates: 40°29′22″N 74°26′37.5″W
- Area: less than one acre
- Built: 1872
- Architectural style: Italianate
- NRHP reference No.: 06000560
- NJRHP No.: 4282

Significant dates
- Added to NRHP: July 12, 2006
- Designated NJRHP: April 20, 2006

William H. Johnson House, built c. 1872, is a historic house in New Brunswick, Middlesex County, New Jersey, United States.

The house is named for William H. Johnson (born 1829), the original owner who lived here until his death, February 26, 1904. William H. Johnson was a prosperous New Brunswick businessman who owned a wallpaper hanging and house painting company, with business addresses on Church Street and Morris Street in New Brunswick. He and his wife Sarah resided here with their daughter Adilade.

The house is a good example of Victorian craftsmanship, built by and for New Brunswick residents in the Italianate style, right after the Civil War when New Brunswick experienced a post-war economic boom. Architectural components including the tall narrow windows with arched tops, double bays, cornice brackets, and low pitched roofs exemplify the Italianate style. It is significant because of the high level of integrity of its original decorative components, including some wallpaper from the late 19th century presumed to be hung by William H. Johnson himself.

The house was added to the National Register of Historic Places on July 12, 2006, for its significance in architecture.

Friends of The William H. Johnson House has been established to support the William H. Johnson House, and is organized exclusively for charitable, scientific and educational purposes, specifically to support the restoration, preservation and maintenance of the William H. Johnson House, and to further knowledge about the building and its inhabitants, and to contribute to the local community through education and outreach. The education and outreach is intended to enhance the community's knowledge of its history and early inhabitants.

== See also ==
- National Register of Historic Places listings in Middlesex County, New Jersey
