= William Johnson House (Fruitdale, South Dakota) =

Historic house in South Dakota, United States

- U.S. National Register of Historic Places
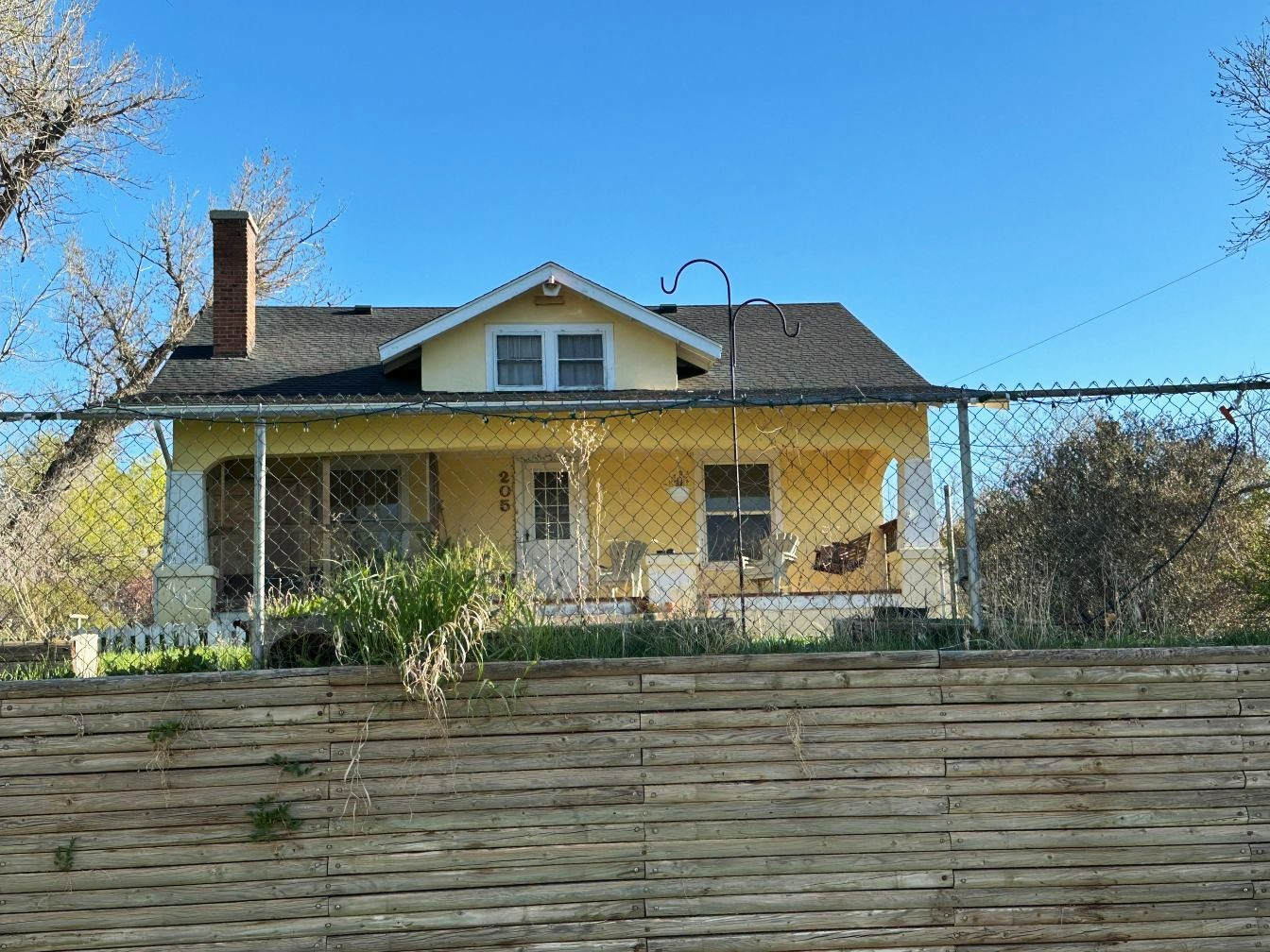
- The houses in 2025

- Location within South Dakota Location within the United States
- Location: High St. Fruitdale, South Dakota
- Coordinates: 44°40′5″N 103°41′47″W
- Built: 1909
- Architectural style: Bungalow/Craftsman
- MPS: Rural Butte and Meade Counties MRA
- NRHP reference No.: 86000928
- Added to NRHP: April 30, 1986

The William Johnson House in Fruitdale, South Dakota, United States, is a bungalow house from c.1909. It was listed on the National Register of Historic Places in 1986.

The house's bungalow/craftsman architecture, of then current vogue, demonstrates that the tiny town was connected to the national marketplace. It is a nearly square building, with a deep front porch, and is unusual for having an elevator. It was built for William Johnson, a banker in Fruitdale.
