= Ben Johnson House =

Ben Johnson House may refer to:

- Ben Johnson House (Bardstown, Kentucky), listed on the NRHP in Kentucky
- Ben Johnson House (Flemingsburg Junction, Kentucky), listed on the NRHP in Kentucky
