= George Johnson House (Calamus, Iowa) =

Historic house in Iowa, United States

- U.S. National Register of Historic Places
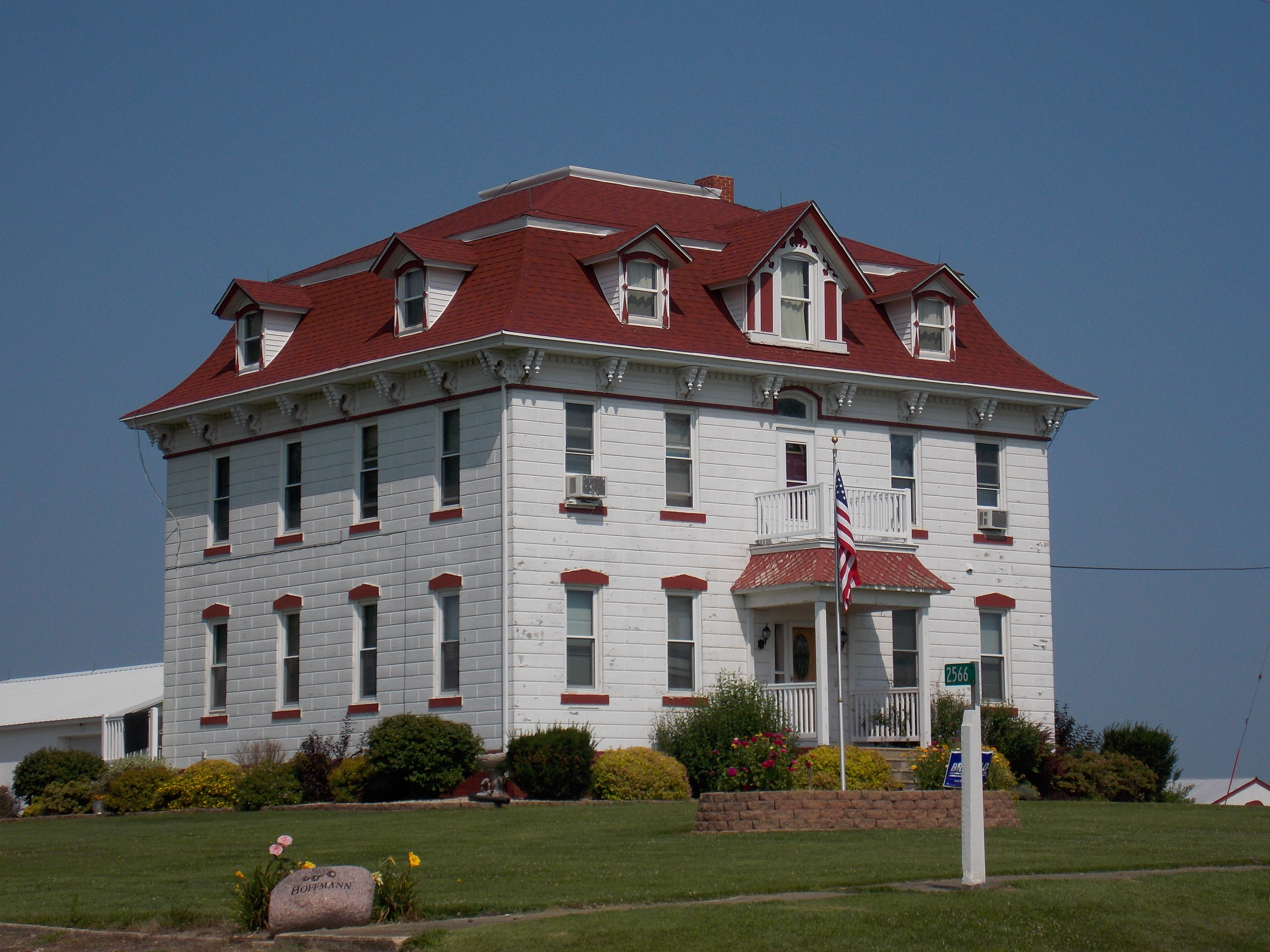

- Location within Iowa Location within the United States
- Location: 2566 190th Ave. Calamus, Iowa
- Coordinates: 41°48′18″N 90°43′26″W
- Area: 5.4 acres (2.2 ha)
- Built: 1878
- Architect: Cornelius Halvorson
- Architectural style: Second Empire
- MPS: Norwegian Related Resources of Olive Township, Clinton County, Iowa MPS
- NRHP reference No.: 00000923
- Added to NRHP: August 15, 2000

The George Johnson House is an historic building located near Calamus, Iowa, United States. It was listed on the National Register of Historic Places in 2000.

== History ==
Gjert (George) Johnson was one of the three brothers who moved to Olive Township, Clinton County, Iowa in 1853. They were the first Norwegians to settle the area. George and his wife Britta Christensdatter had nine children and they purchased the land on which the house and surrounding farm sits in 1861. Their original house, no longer extant, was across the road. The family was charter members of the nearby Kvindherred Lutheran Church and donated the land for the cemetery. By 1879 George owned over 600 acres (240 ha) of land, which made him one of the largest landowners in the township. He built this house for over $7000. The Johnsons lived in this house from 1878, when it was built until 1882, when most of them moved to Norman County, Minnesota. One of the Johnson daughters remained behind with her husband, the Rev. J.J. Heie, who was the pastor at Kvindherred Church from 1900 to 1913. They continued to live in the house. It was sold, along with 78 acres (32 ha), to John Olson in 1913. Pastor Sheldahl lived in the house when he was at Kvindherred Church in the 1930s. Three sons of George Johnson's brother Arne (Aaron) bought the house in 1949. It remains a farmhouse.

== Architecture ==
The George Johnson House is a 2½-story frame dwelling built on a coursed limestone foundation with a full basement. The entire structure is square and measures 40 by 40 feet (12 by 12 m). The front entrance faces the road to the east. The enclosed porch with a mansard roof on the back of the house is original, but the front porch is not. The front porch features balustrades on the lower level and on the roof, which can be accessed from the second floor. The exterior is clad in tongue-and-groove pine siding that simulates ashlar masonry. The window sills and hoods are boxed wood construction and made to look like solid stone. The house is capped with a concave mansard roof with dormers on the lower portion that rises to a flat portion with a widow's walk, which originally had a metal balustrade. Paired wooden brackets with pendants are located below the eaves. Between the brackets is a row of dentils located above a paneled frieze. A rope mold separates the cornice zone from the rest of the wall section.

The house is an unusual example of the Second Empire style found on an Iowa farmstead. It is also unusual for its use of wood siding to simulate ashlar masonry. The only other example in the state is the Lambrite-Iles-Petersen House in Davenport. Its prominence is aided by its large size and its location on higher ground than the relatively flat surrounding farmland.
