= William A. and Ida C. Johnson House =

Historic house in Iowa, United States

- U.S. National Register of Historic Places
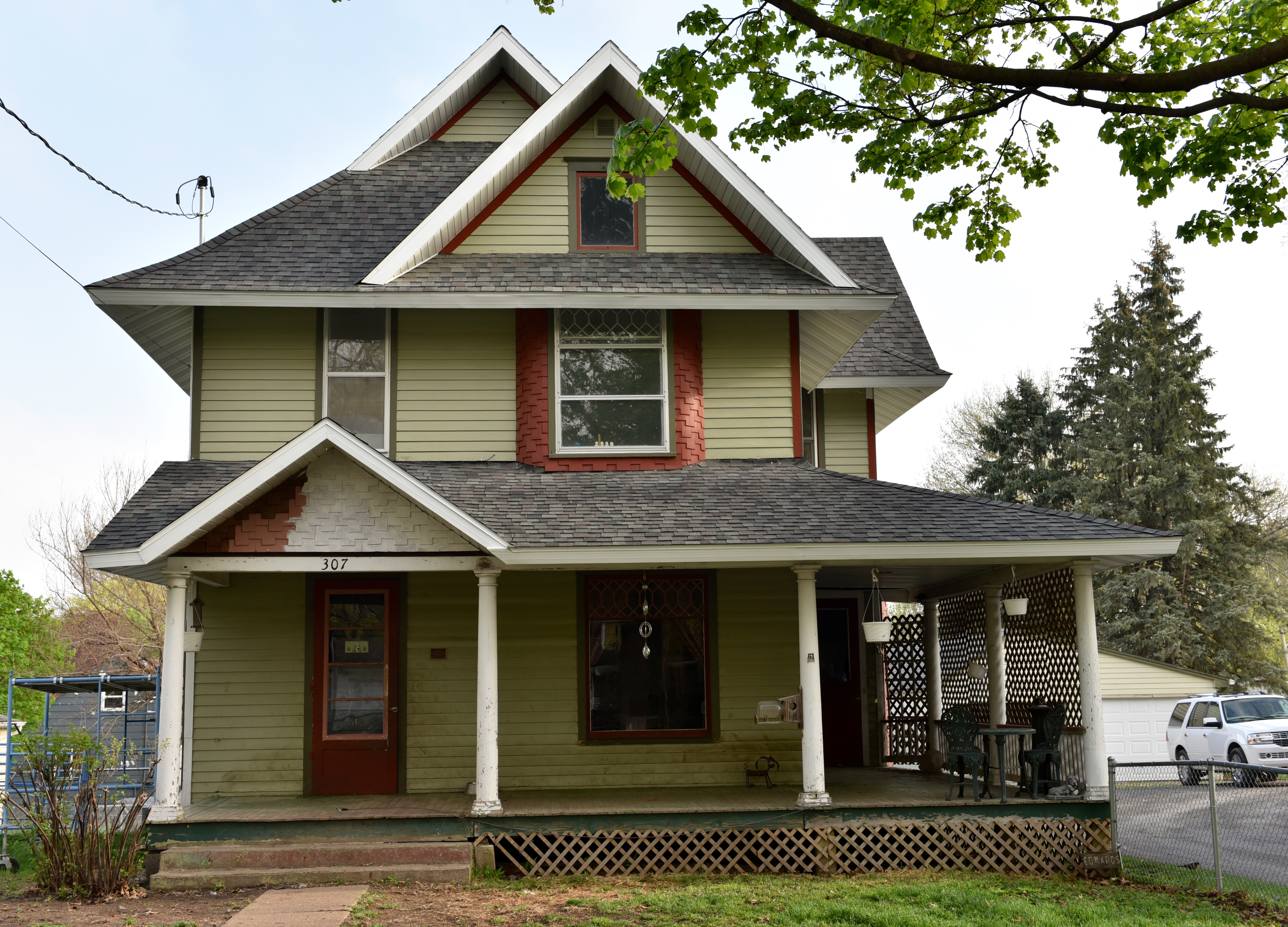

- Location within Iowa Location within the United States
- Location: 307 College Ave. Oskaloosa, Iowa
- Coordinates: 41°18′13″N 92°38′52″W
- Area: less than one acre
- Built: 1910
- Architectural style: Queen Anne
- MPS: Quaker Testimony in Oskaloosa MPS
- NRHP reference No.: 96000346
- Added to NRHP: March 28, 1996

The William A. and Ida C. Johnson House is a historic residence located in Oskaloosa, Iowa, United States. The Johnsons, who were farmers, moved to town so that their children could attend Quaker schools there. This was typical of many Quaker families of that era. Other family members also boarded with them so they too could attend the schools. William Johnson also served on the William Penn College Board of Trustees and served as its president from 1915 through 1922. It was during his tenure that the Main Building was destroyed by fire and the college moved to its present location. This Queen Anne style house is a 2½-story, frame, single-family dwelling. It features a wrap-around full-width porch with a gable-end entryway and a bay window on the main facade. The house is capped with a complex roof of intersecting steeply pitched gables. It is the Johnsons' association with the school in the context of the Quaker testimony in Oskaloosa that makes this house historic. It was listed on the National Register of Historic Places in 1996.
