= John and Edward Johnson Three-Decker =

- U.S. National Register of Historic Places
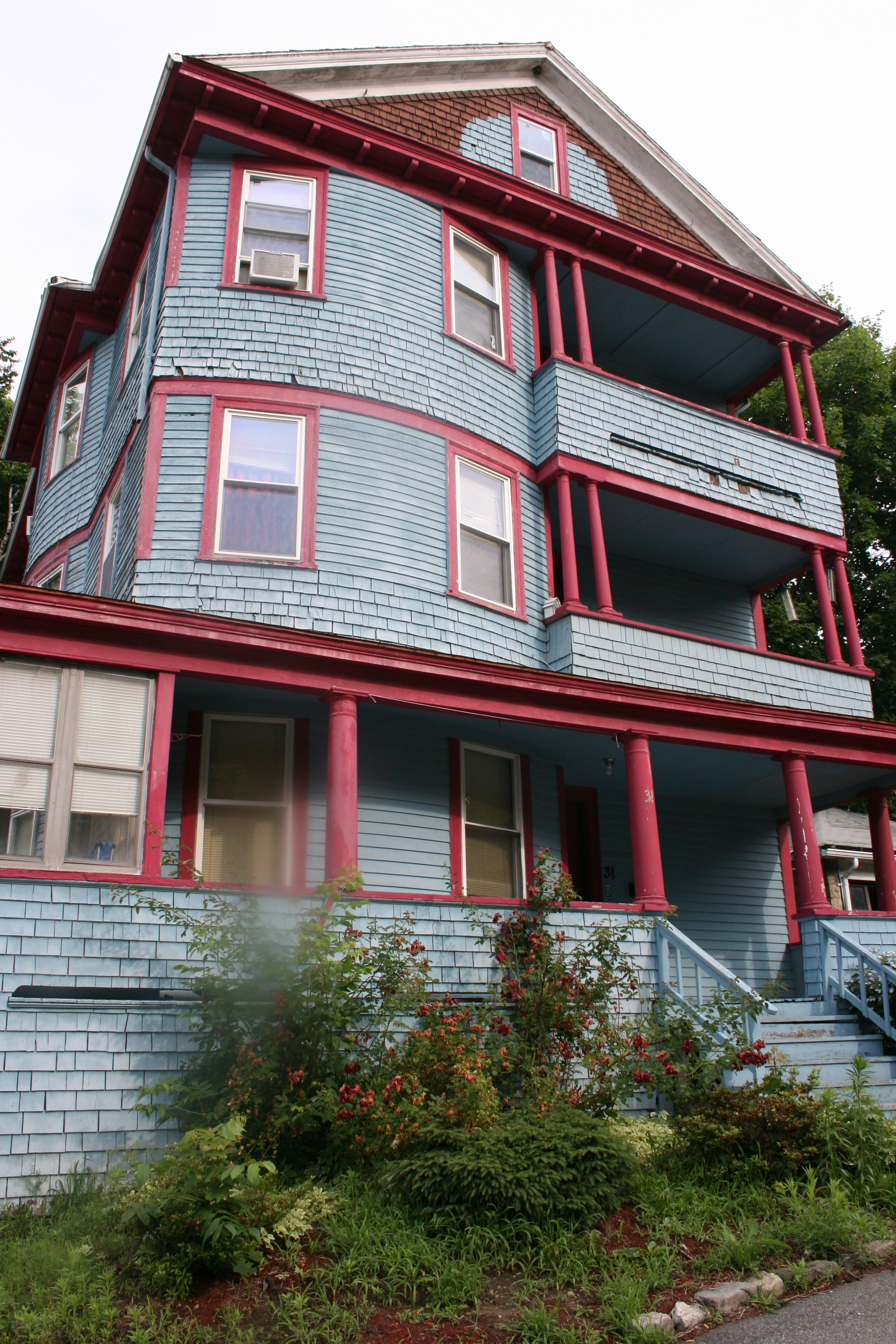

- Location within Massachusetts Location within the United States
- Location: 31 Louise St., Worcester, Massachusetts
- Coordinates: 42°14′30″N 71°47′46″W
- Area: less than one acre
- Built: c. 1918
- Architectural style: Colonial Revival
- MPS: Worcester Three-Deckers TR
- NRHP reference No.: 89002416
- Added to NRHP: February 9, 1990

The John and Edward Johnson Three-Decker is a historic triple decker house in Worcester, Massachusetts. The house was built c. 1918, and is a well-preserved and distinctive example of Colonial Revival styling, with a number of unusual features. The house was listed on the National Register of Historic Places in 1990.

== Description and history ==
The John and Edward Johnson Three-Decker is located in Worcester's southeaster Vernon Hill neighborhood, on the west side of Louise Street. It is a three-story frame structure, covered by a gabled roof, and finished in a combination of wooden shingles and clapboards. Its front has a stack of porches on the right side, and a rounded window bay on the left. Unlike many triple deckers its first floor porch extends part way around one of the sides. The house is sided in alternating sections of shingles and clapboards, and its upper porches are supported by grouped slender turned columns. The left side of the house also as a projecting three-story window bay. The front roof gable is fully pedimented, and there are shallow brackets in the eaves.

The house was built about 1918, when the area was being heavily developed with triple deckers. Many of the area's early residents were immigrants working in nearby steel mills and wire factories. The first owners, John and Edward Johnson, were probably Swedish immigrants, and were respectively a machinist and a wire worker. Early tenants included Irish and Swedish immigrants.

== See also ==
- National Register of Historic Places listings in eastern Worcester, Massachusetts
