= William Derby Johnson Jr. House =

- William Derby Johnson, Jr., House
- U.S. National Register of Historic Places
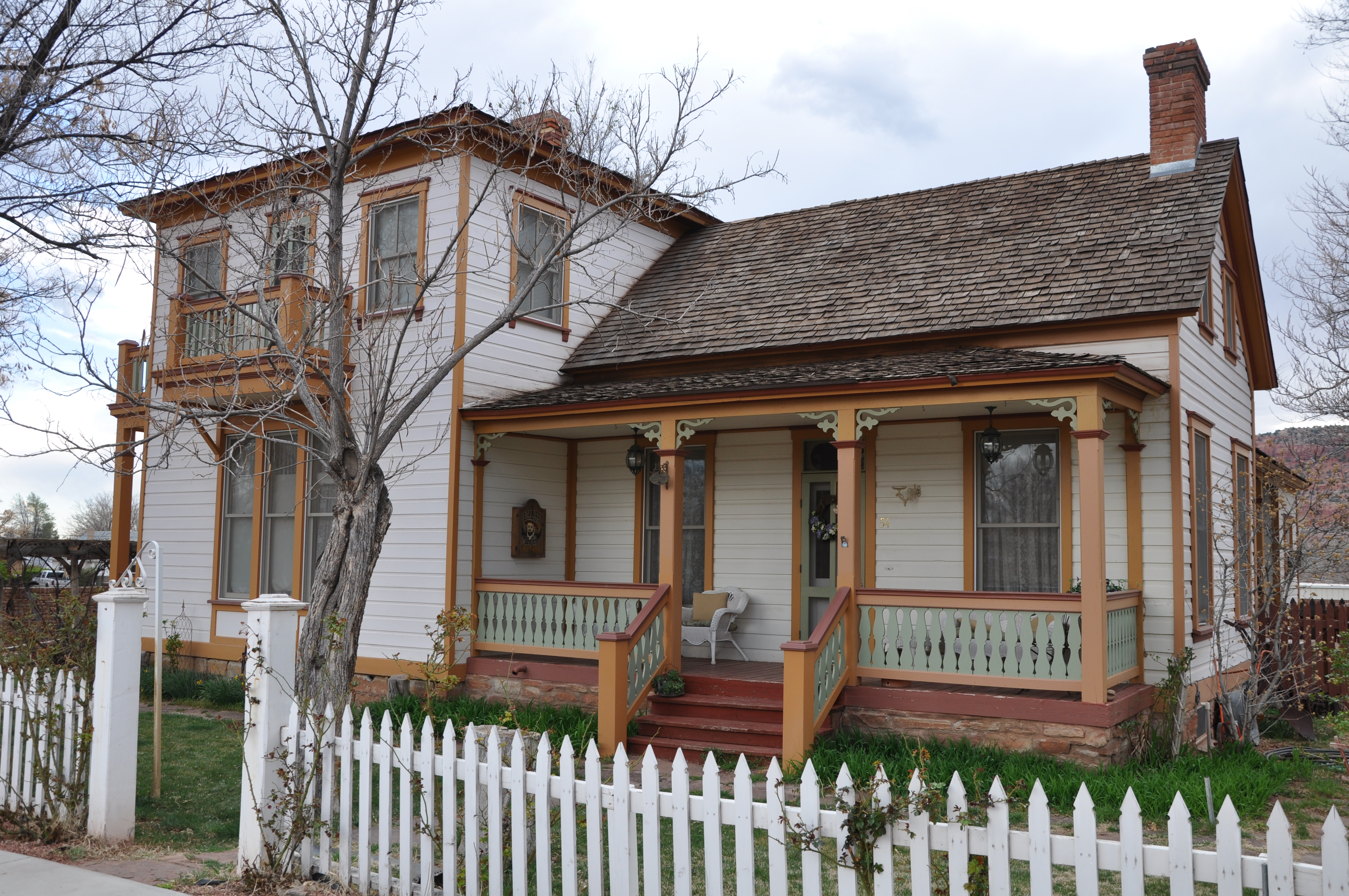
- The house in 2013

- Location within Utah Location within the United States
- Location: 54 South Main Street, Kanab, Utah
- Coordinates: 37°02′49″N 112°31′42″W
- Area: 1.6 acres (0.65 ha)
- Built: 1884
- Architectural style: Italianate, Cross wing
- MPS: Kanab, Utah MPS
- NRHP reference No.: 01000315
- Added to NRHP: April 6, 2001

The William Derby Johnson, Jr., House is a historic house in Kanab, Utah. It was built in 1884-1885 for William Derby Johnson, Jr., a veteran of the Black Hawk War of 1865-1872 and a Mormon settler. Johnson had four wives: Lucy Annie Salisbury, Lucy Elizabeth Brown, Charlesetta Prescott Cram, and Mary Agnes Riggs. The house was designed in the Italianate architectural style. It was acquired in 1886 by George Conrad Naegle, who lived here with his two wives, Sabra Higbee Naegle and Anna Fauth. Three years later, it was acquired by Alfred D. Young, who lived here with his wife Ana Little and their thirteen children. By 1900, the house had been remodelled as a hotel, and it was the first hotel in Kanab. The property has been listed on the National Register of Historic Places since April 6, 2001.
