= William Julius "Judy" Johnson House =

Historic house in Delaware, US

- U.S. National Register of Historic Places
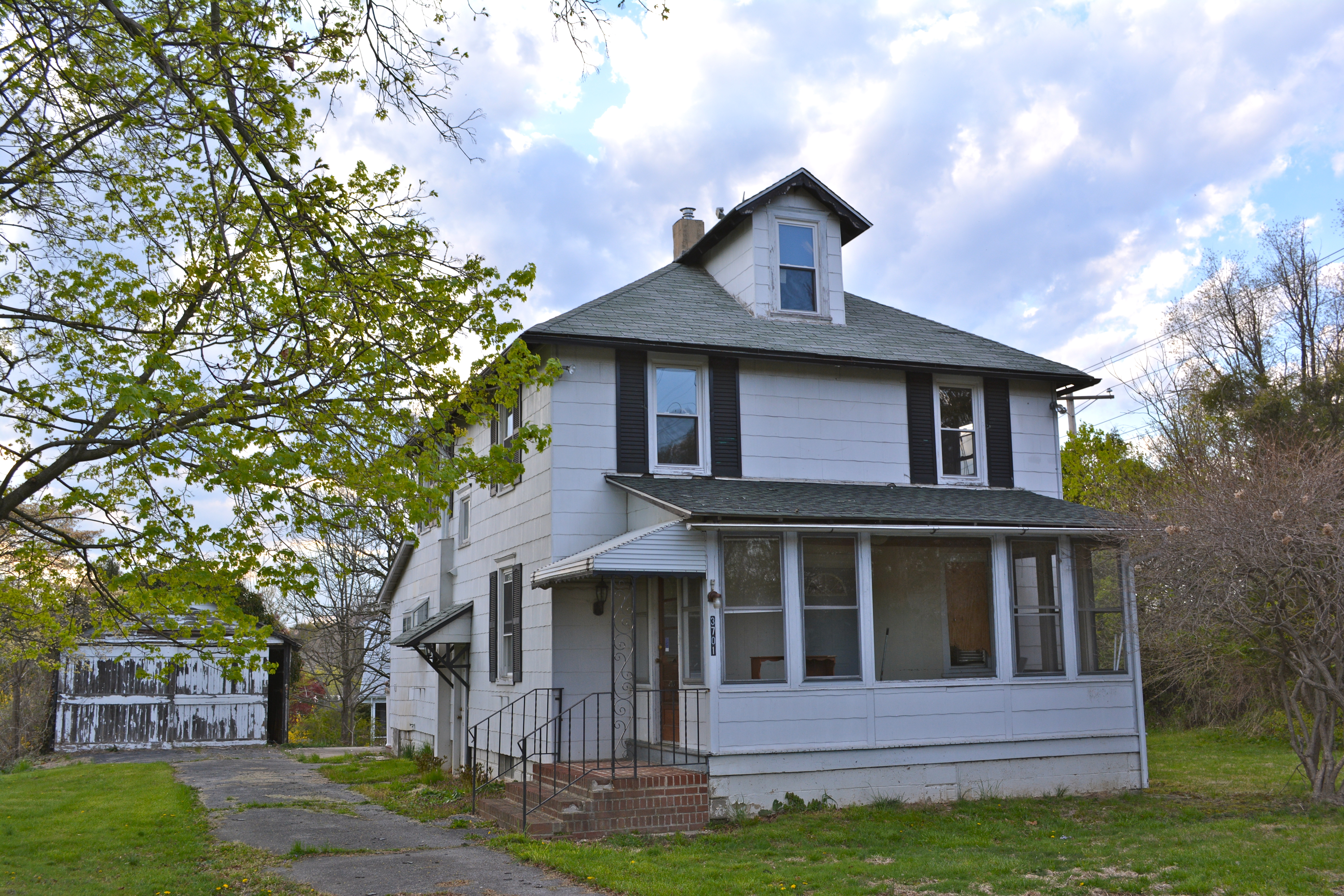

- Location within Delaware Location within the United States
- Location: 3701 Kiamensi Ave., Christiana Hundred, Marshallton, Delaware
- Coordinates: 39°43′48″N 75°38′0″W
- Area: less than one acre
- Built: 1934
- Architectural style: Bungalow/craftsman
- NRHP reference No.: 95001145
- Added to NRHP: October 10, 1995

William Julius "Judy" Johnson House is a historic home located at Marshallton, Delaware, United States. It was built about 1925, and is a two-story, three-bay, rectangular frame dwelling with a one-story front porch. It has a hipped and gable roof with dormer and is reflective of the American Craftsman style. Wavy asbestos siding was added to the home in 1939. Also on the property is a contributing two car garage. It was the home of Hall of Fame baseball player Judy Johnson (ca. 1900–1989), who played in the Negro leagues between 1921 and 1937. Johnson purchased the home in 1934, and resided in it until shortly before his death.

It was added to the National Register of Historic Places in 1995.

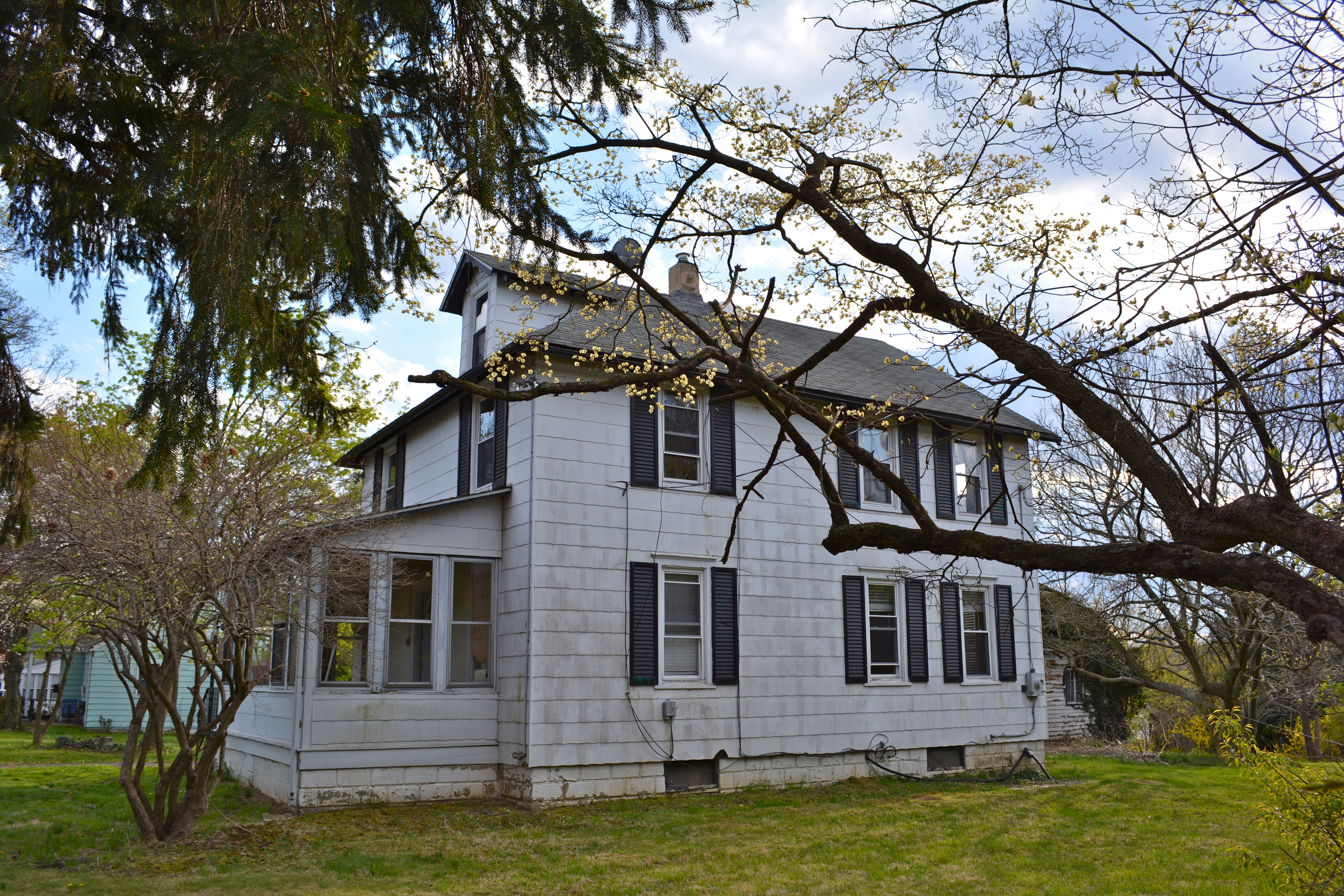

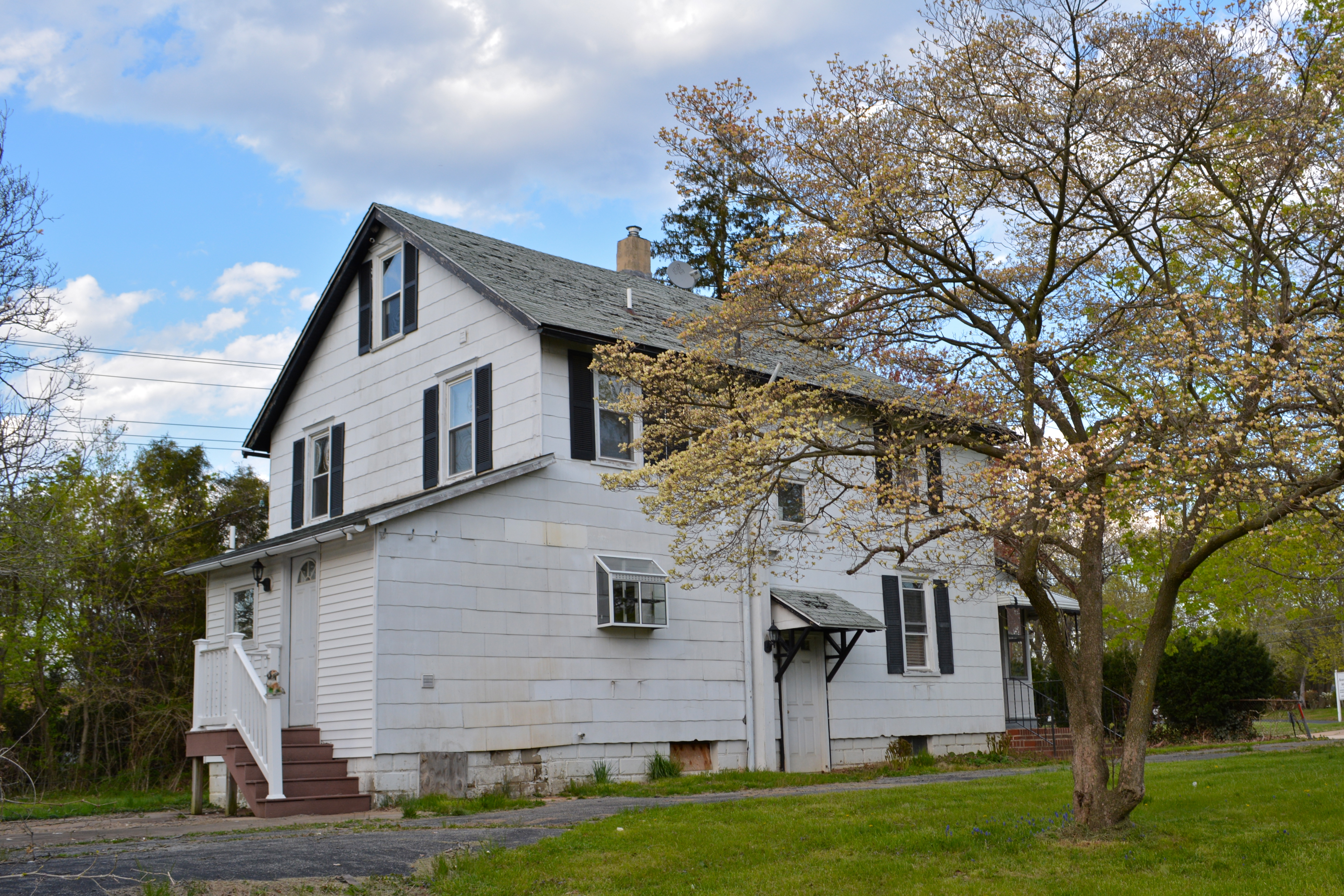
