= Thomas Johnson Polygonal Barn =

- Formerly listed on the U.S. National Register of Historic Places
- Location within Iowa Location within the United States
- Location: Off Iowa Highway 114, Wellman, Iowa
- Coordinates: 41°26′21″N 91°49′44″W
- Area: less than one acre
- Built by: Thomas Johnson
- MPS: Iowa Round Barns: The Sixty Year Experiment TR
- NRHP reference No.: 86001451

Significant dates
- Added to NRHP: June 30, 1986
- Removed from NRHP: December 19, 2014

The Thomas Johnson Polygonal Barn was a historic building located near Wellman in rural Washington County, Iowa, United States. The 16-sided building measured 40 feet (12 m) in diameter. The structure was covered in red vertical siding and it was topped by a sectional conical roof, with windows on the south side and an aerator. The numerous windows and the 15 hog pens that were around its perimeter suggests that this was built as a hog barn as light and ventilation in hog barns were a concern in the early 20th-century. It was listed on the National Register of Historic Places in 1986. The barn has subsequently been torn down, and it was removed from the National Register in 2014.
