= John Johnson Three-Decker =

- U.S. National Register of Historic Places
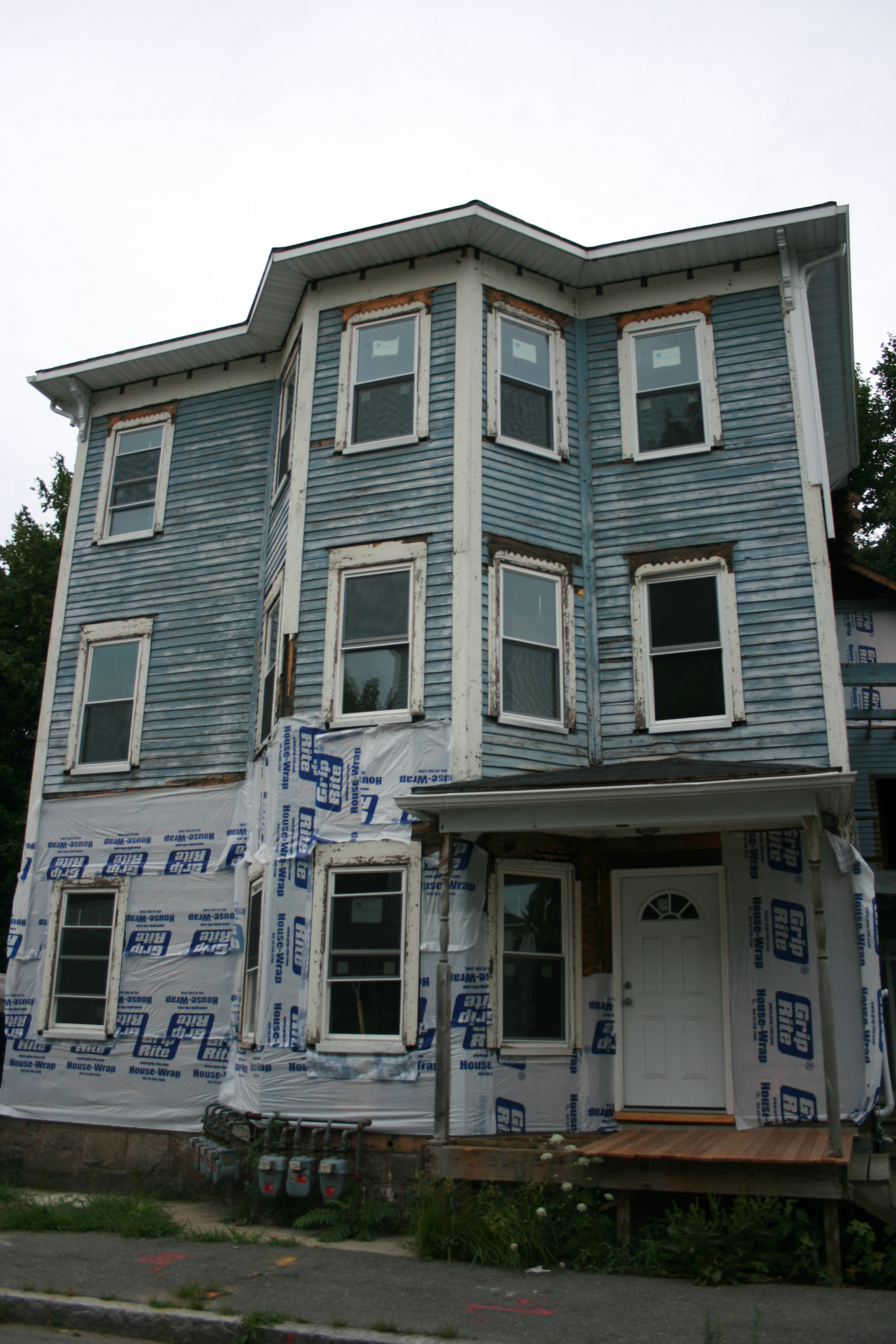

- Location within Massachusetts Location within the United States
- Location: 140 Eastern Ave., Worcester, Massachusetts
- Coordinates: 42°16′23″N 71°47′22″W
- Area: less than one acre
- Built: 1894
- Architectural style: Queen Anne
- MPS: Worcester Three-Deckers TR
- NRHP reference No.: 89002408
- Added to NRHP: February 9, 1990

The John Johnson Three-Decker is a historic triple decker house in Worcester, Massachusetts. The house was built c. 1894, and is a distinctive variant of the form, with a central projecting bay section. It was listed on the National Register of Historic Places in 1990.

== Description and history ==
The John Johnson Three-Decker is located on a residential street in eastern Worcester, on the west side of Eastern Avenue north of Belmont Avenue (Massachusetts Route 9, a major through road). It is a three-story frame structure, covered by hip roof with decorative brackets in it eaves. The walls are finished in wooden clapboards. The facade of the building is unusual for triple deckers built in Worcester, with three bays, of which the center one is a projecting polygonal window bay. The main entrance is in the right bay, sheltered by a hip-roofed porch. When listed on the National Register of Historic Places in 1990, the porch had turned balusters and supports, features that have since been removed.

The Belmont Avenue area in which the house was built was primarily populated by Scandinavian immigrants at the time of its construction, c. 1894. This was one of the first parts of the Belmont Avenue area to be built out with triple deckers, which provided housing for workers at the major steel and wire plants north of downtown Worcester. John Johnson, its first owner, was an absentee landlord who was also a woodworker. Typical early tenants were machinists, laborers, and wire workers of Finnish and Swedish extraction.

== See also ==
- National Register of Historic Places listings in eastern Worcester, Massachusetts
