= List of Grambling State University alumni =

This list of Grambling State University alumni includes graduates, non-graduate former students and current students of Grambling State University.

Grambling State University is a historically black (HBCU), public university, located in Grambling, Louisiana, United States.

== Academia ==
Name	Class year	Notability	References
Israel Dunn Jr.	1968	president of Arkansas Baptist College	
Ivory V. Nelson	1959	president of Lincoln University of Pennsylvania	

== Criminal justice ==
Name / Class year / Notability / References; Burl Cain / / master's degree in criminal justice, now warden of the Louisiana State Penitentiary (also known as Angola)

== Entertainment ==
Name	Class year	Notability	References
Erykah Badu		Grammy Award-winning artist	
Natalie Desselle-Reid		actress best known for roles in B*A*P*S, Def Jam's How to Be a Player, and Disney's Cinderella	
E-40		rapper	
Judi Ann Mason		television writer, producer and playwright	

== Journalism ==
Name / Class year / Notability / References; Charles M. Blow / 1991 / New York Times columnist

== Politics ==
Name	Class year	Notability	References
Robert Bobb		politician and public administrator; Emergency Financial Director for Detroit Public Schools; city manager for thirty years in the cities of Kalamazoo, Michigan; Santa Ana, California; and Richmond, Virginia	
Israel B. Curtis		member of the Louisiana House of Representatives from 1992 to 2008; member of the Rapides Parish School Board from 1976 to 1992	
Bettye Davis		member of the Alaska Senate and former member of the Alaska House of Representatives from the 21st district	
Rick Gallot		Democratic member of the Louisiana State Senate for District 29 since 2012; former state representative for the 11th district	
Jeff Hall		member of the Louisiana House of Representatives (District 26), accountant in Alexandria	
Hao Mingjin		CNDCA member of the National People's Congress, vice chairperson of the Standing Committee of the National People's Congress	
Steven Jackson	2010	politician, member of the Louisiana House of Representatives (2nd district)	
Edward Joseph Price	1975	member of the Louisiana House of Representatives (District 58), businessman in Gonzales	
Alicia Reece		politician, member of the Ohio House of Representatives (33rd district)	

== Sports ==
Name	Class year	Notability	Reference(s)
Tommie Agee	1961	professional baseball player	
Garland Boyette		professional football player	
Jophery Brown		Major League Baseball player; stuntman in film and television for over 30 years	
Willie Brown	1963	professional football player; member of the Pro Football Hall of Fame	
Buck Buchanan		professional football player; member of the College Football Hall of Fame and the Pro Football Hall of Fame	
Ronnie Coleman		professional bodybuilder and eight-time Mr. Olympia winner	
Gary Eave	2025	professional baseball player	
Bruce Eugene	2005	professional football player	
Clemente Gordon	1990	football player	
Charles "Charlie Red" Hardnett	1962	ABA basketball player	
James "Shack" Harris	1969	first black quarterback to start in the NFL	
Jason Hatcher	2006	current NFL defensive end	
Tyree Hollins		professional football player	
Johnny Jeter		Major League Baseball player	
Trumaine Johnson		professional football player	
Charlie Joiner	1969	professional football player and member of the Pro Football Hall of Fame	
Ernie Ladd		professional football player and professional wrestler (nicknamed "The Big Cat")	
Albert Lewis		professional football player	
John Mendenhall	1972	NFL defensive lineman	
Guy Prather		professional football player	
Willis Reed		professional basketball player	
Patrick Scott		professional football player	
Goldie Sellers		professional football player	
Winston Short		track athlete who competed for Trinidad in the Commonwealth and Pan American Games during the 1960s	
Everson Walls	1980	NFL All-Pro cornerback and Super Bowl champion (XXV)	
Doug Williams		NFL quarterback; MVP of Super Bowl XXII	
Gerald Williams		Major League Baseball player	

== See also ==
- Grambling State University alumni
