= James Mitchell School =

- U.S. National Register of Historic Places
- U.S. Historic district – Contributing property
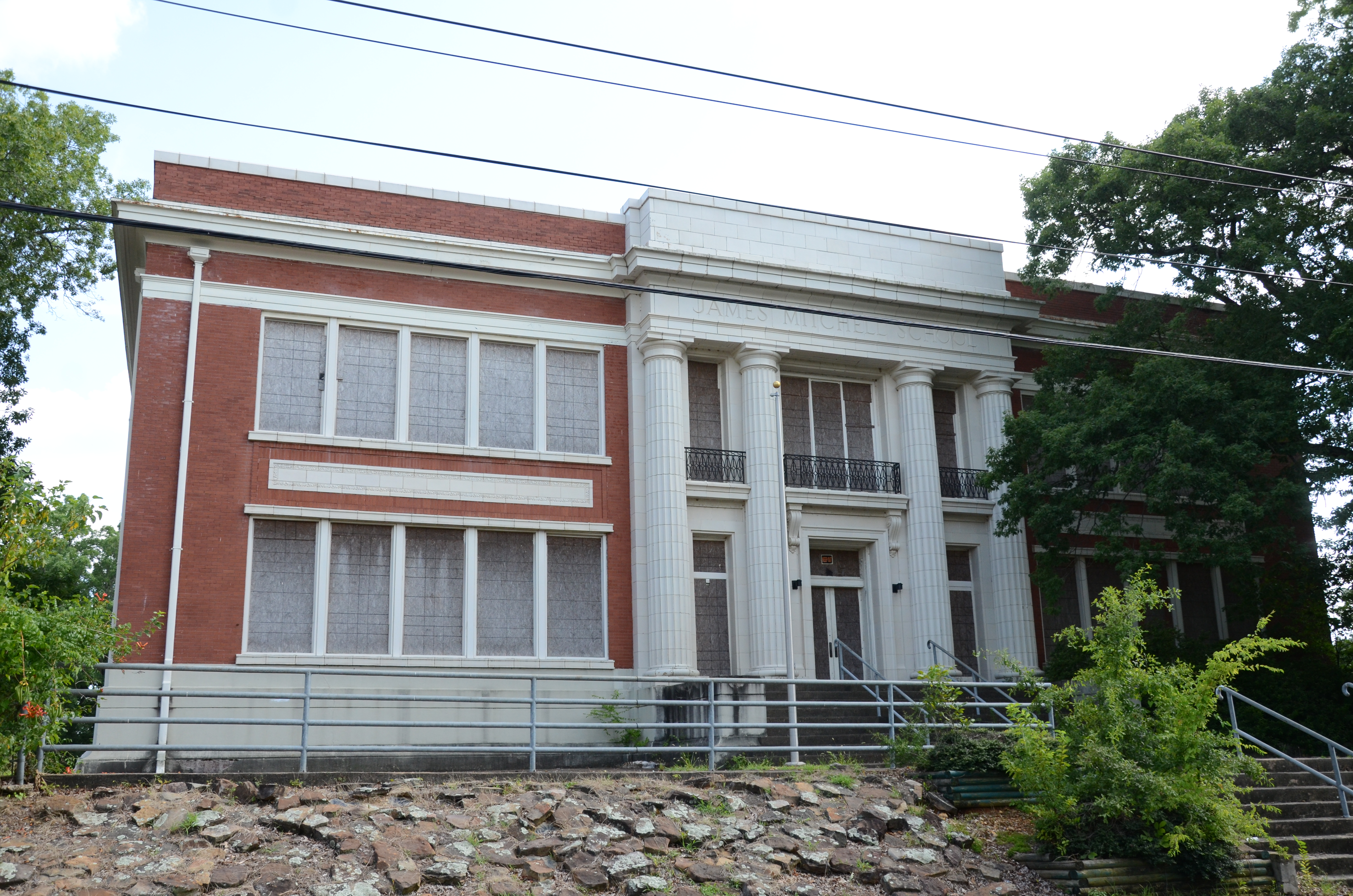

- Location within Arkansas Location within the United States
- Location: 2410 S. Battery St., Little Rock, Arkansas
- Coordinates: 34°43′40″N 92°17′41″W
- Area: 2.5 acres (1.0 ha)
- Built: 1908
- Architect: Charles L. Thompson
- Architectural style: Prairie School, Classical Revival
- Part of: Central High School Neighborhood Historic District (2012 boundary increase) (ID12000320)
- NRHP reference No.: 09000322

Significant dates
- Added to NRHP: May 20, 2009
- Designated CP: June 7, 2012

The James Mitchell School is a historic school building at 2410 South Battery Street in Little Rock, Arkansas. The oldest portion of the building is a four-room structure designed by Charles L. Thompson and built in 1908. It was enlarged several times, notably by Thompson in 1910 (adding four rooms), and Thomas Harding, Jr. in 1915 (again adding four rooms), and 1952. Harding's addition gave the building its prominent Classical Revival entrance portico. The school property includes two outbuildings that also houses classrooms. The school was originally a segregated facility, serving only white students, but the end of segregation (achieved in Little Rock in the early 1970s) transformed the school into one that served its predominantly black neighborhood. It was closed in 2005.

The building was listed on the National Register of Historic Places in 2009. In 2017, the Charter Authorizing Panel of the Arkansas Department of Education approved a proposal to open a K-5 charter school, ScholarMade Achievement Place, in the Mitchell building, targeting an opening date for the 2018–2019 school year.

== See also ==
- National Register of Historic Places listings in Little Rock, Arkansas
