= John Henry Clayborn House =

Historic house in Arkansas, United States

- U.S. National Register of Historic Places
- U.S. Historic district – Contributing property
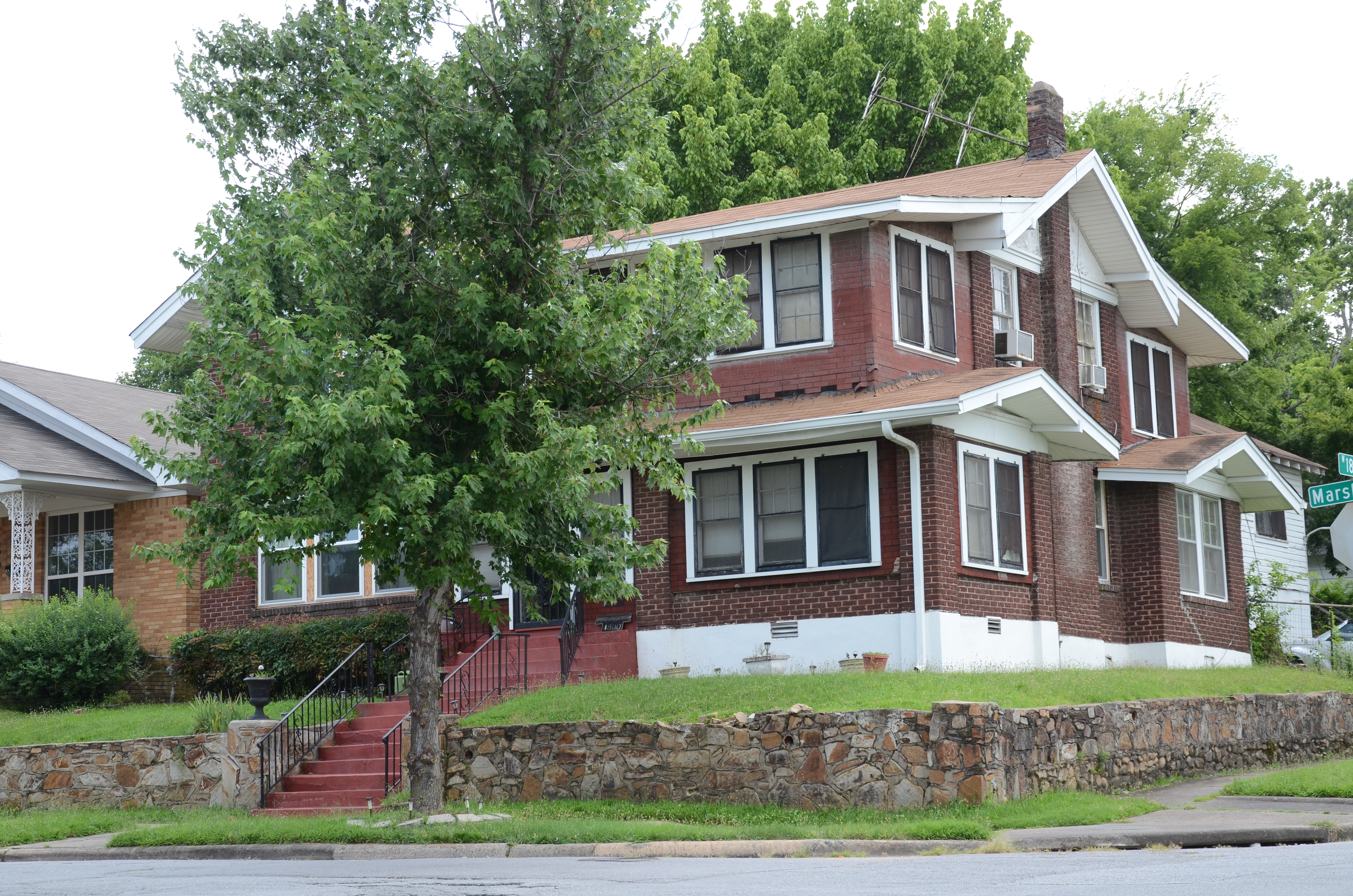

- Location within Arkansas Location within the United States
- Location: 1800 Marshall, Little Rock, Arkansas
- Coordinates: 34°44′7″N 92°17′32″W
- Area: less than one acre
- Architectural style: Bungalow/craftsman
- Part of: Central High School Neighborhood Historic District (2012 boundary increase) (ID12000320)
- NRHP reference No.: 06000420

Significant dates
- Added to NRHP: May 24, 2006
- Designated CP: June 7, 2012

The John Henry Clayborn House is a historic house at 1800 Marshall Street in Little Rock, Arkansas, USA. It is a two-story structure, built out of wood framing reinforced with concrete, with its exterior finished in brick. Its front façade is symmetrical, with the center entrance flanked by banks of three windows, topped by a shed roof that continues to the side, where it forms a gable. Built in 1932, the house is noted for its association with Bishop John Henry Clayborn, a leading advocate of the education, spiritual development and civil rights of African Americans in Arkansas.

The house was listed on the National Register of Historic Places in 2006.

== See also ==
- National Register of Historic Places listings in Little Rock, Arkansas
