= Dunaway House =

Historic house in Arkansas, United States

- U.S. National Register of Historic Places
- U.S. Historic district – Contributing property
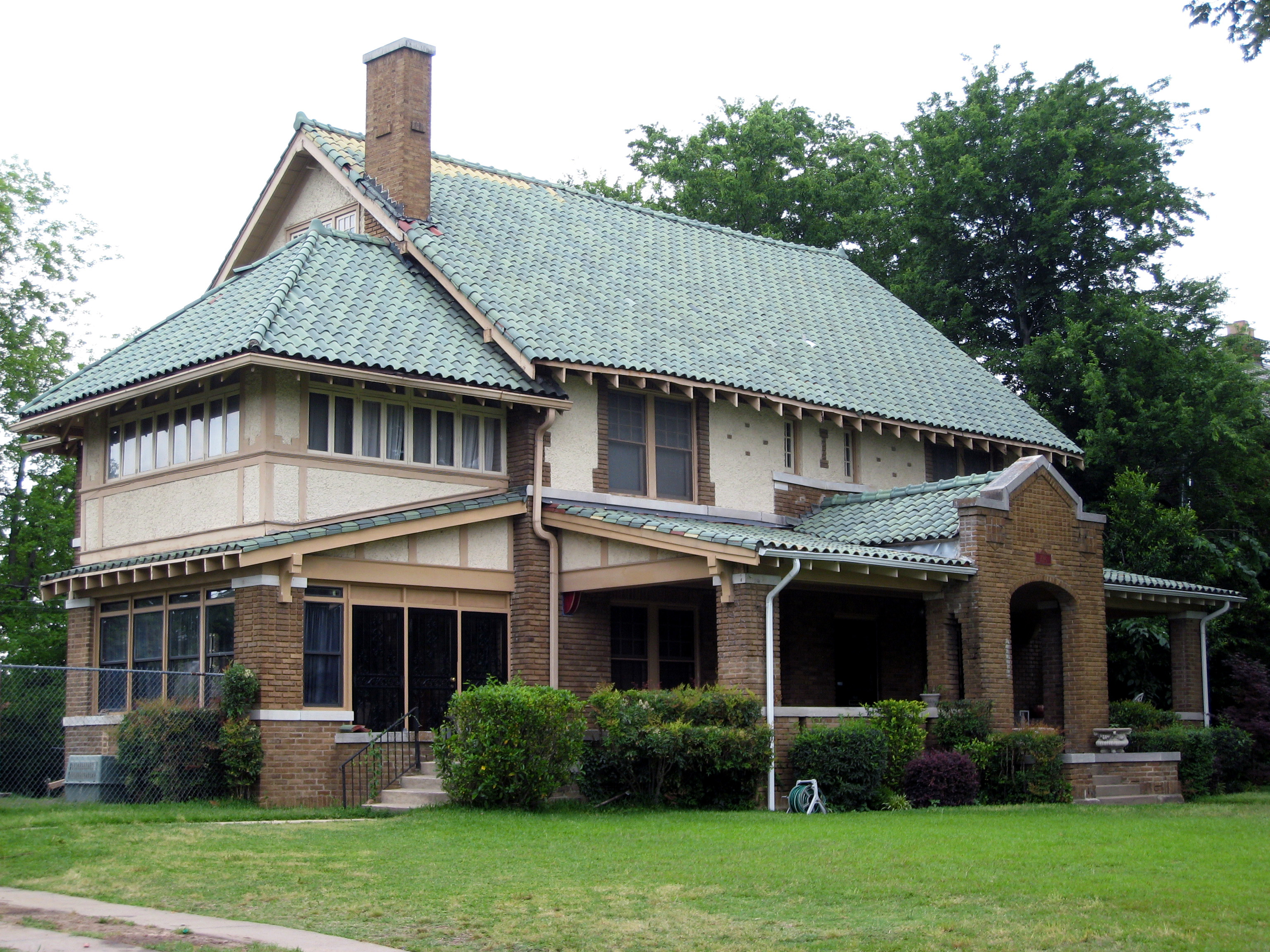

- Location within Arkansas Location within the United States
- Location: 2022 Battery, Little Rock, Arkansas
- Coordinates: 34°43′46″N 92°17′39″W
- Area: less than one acre
- Built: 1915
- Architect: Charles L. Thompson
- Architectural style: Bungalow/craftsman
- Part of: Central High School Neighborhood Historic District (2012 boundary increase) (ID12000320)
- MPS: Thompson, Charles L., Design Collection TR
- NRHP reference No.: 82000885

Significant dates
- Added to NRHP: December 22, 1982
- Designated CP: June 7, 2012

The Dunaway House is an historic house at 2022 Battery in Little Rock, Arkansas. Designed in the Craftsman Style, it is located on a boulevard on Battery Street. The two-story brick house is in the Central High School Neighborhood Historic District. It was designed by architect Charles L. Thompson of Little Rock in 1915. The Dunaway House features a terra-cotta gable roof with a portico over an arched entrance. It has a south-facing two-story wing with a hip roof.

The house was listed individually on the National Register of Historic Places in 1982.
