= Centennial Baptist Church =

Historic church in Arkansas, United States

- U.S. National Register of Historic Places
- U.S. National Historic Landmark
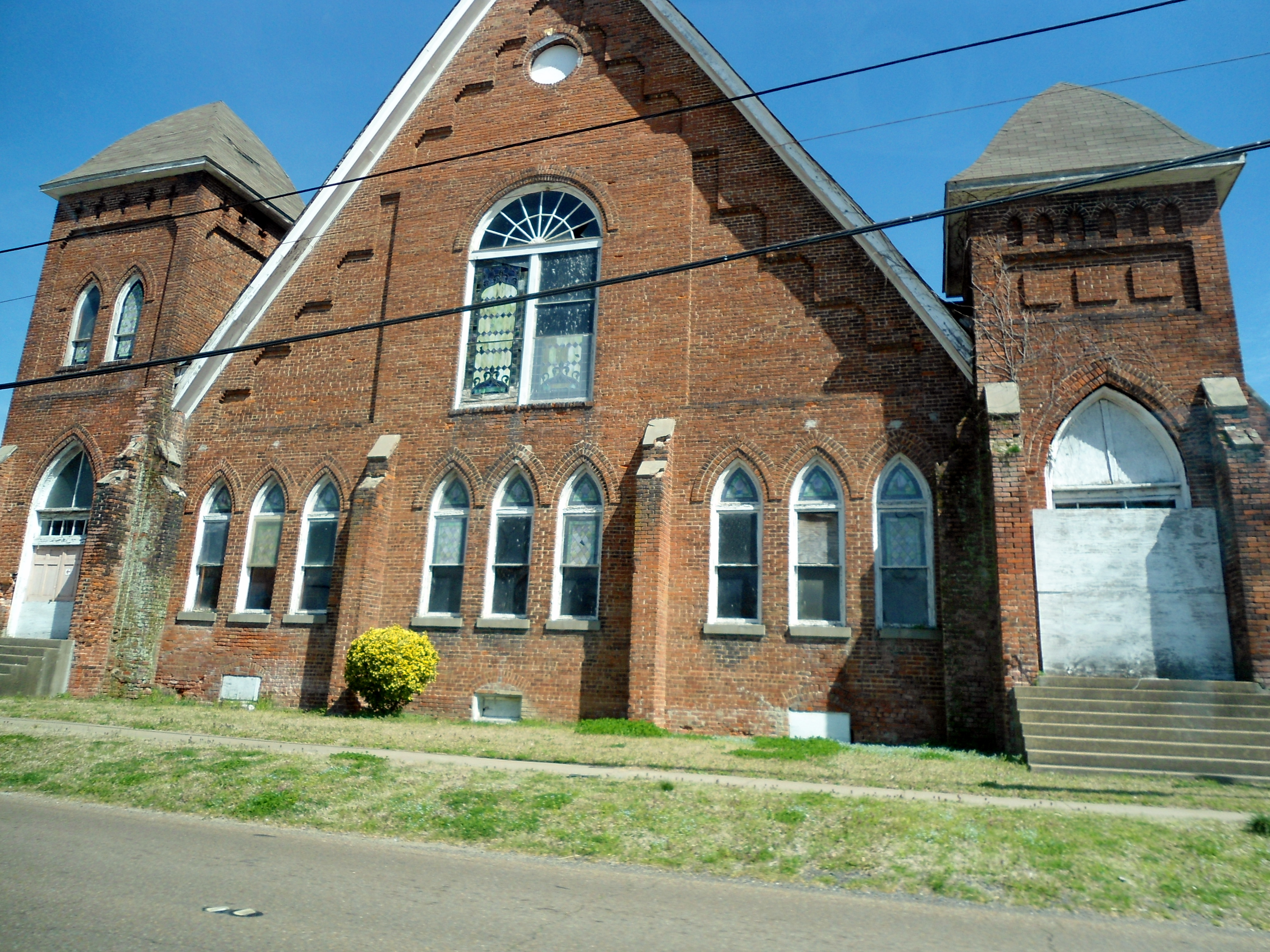
- Centennial Baptist Church, March 2013

- Location within Arkansas Location within the United States
- Location: Helena, Arkansas
- Coordinates: 34°31′31.69″N 90°35′26.63″W
- Built: 1905
- Architect: Henry James Price
- Architectural style: Late Gothic Revival
- NRHP reference No.: 87000518 (original); 03001044 (increase)

Significant dates
- Added to NRHP: March 26, 1987
- Boundary increase: July 31, 2003
- Designated NHL: July 31, 2003

The Centennial Baptist Church is a historic church building at the corner of York and Columbia Streets in Helena, Arkansas. It is significant for its association with Elias Camp Morris (1855-1922), who was the pastor of the church from 1879 and who was a driving force in the establishment of the National Baptist Convention, USA, Inc. Morris served as the convention's president from 1895 until his death, and his church served functionally as the organization's headquarters. The church was listed on the National Register of Historic Places in 1987, and was declared a National Historic Landmark in 2003.

The church was severely damaged by high winds on April 12, 2020 in the 2020 Easter tornado outbreak.

== Description and history ==
The present church building was designed by Henry James Price, a parishioner of the church, and built in 1895. It is a Gothic Revival structure executed in brick, with its main (western) facade consisting of a pair of towers flanking a large central gable. The main entrances, one in each tower, are in Gothic arched openings, and the first level under the main gable consists of three bays of tripled Gothic lancet windows, separated by buttresses. A round-arch window in the gable is topped at the gable point by an oculus. The roofline of the gable is decorated by corbelled brickwork resembling vergeboard.

Elias Camp Morris assumed the pastorship of the Centennial Church in 1879, then a new congregation. He quickly rose in prominence in Baptist circles, leading the Arkansas Negro Baptist Convention and chairing the board of trustees of Arkansas Baptist College, founded in 1884. He also established a publication, the Baptist Vanguard, in 1882, which became a model for other publications. The National Baptist Convention was formed in the 1886 by the merger of three African-American Baptist church organizations. This body only achieved a united focus in 1895, at a meeting in which Morris was elected its president. The convention was the largest deliberative body of African-Americans in the nation at the time. Morris was also politically active in Republican Party circles, attending national conventions as a delegate.

The Centennial Baptist Church served as Morris' home base for all of his activities, and grew substantially under his leadership. It is the only building associated with his productive life that is still standing.

=== 2020 damage ===
The Centennial Baptist Church was heavily damaged by high winds on April 12, 2020. Helena mayor Kevin Smith described the condition of the church as "a bombed-out World War II ruin." The storm, part of the 2020 Easter tornado outbreak, also destroyed two other nearby historic buildings.

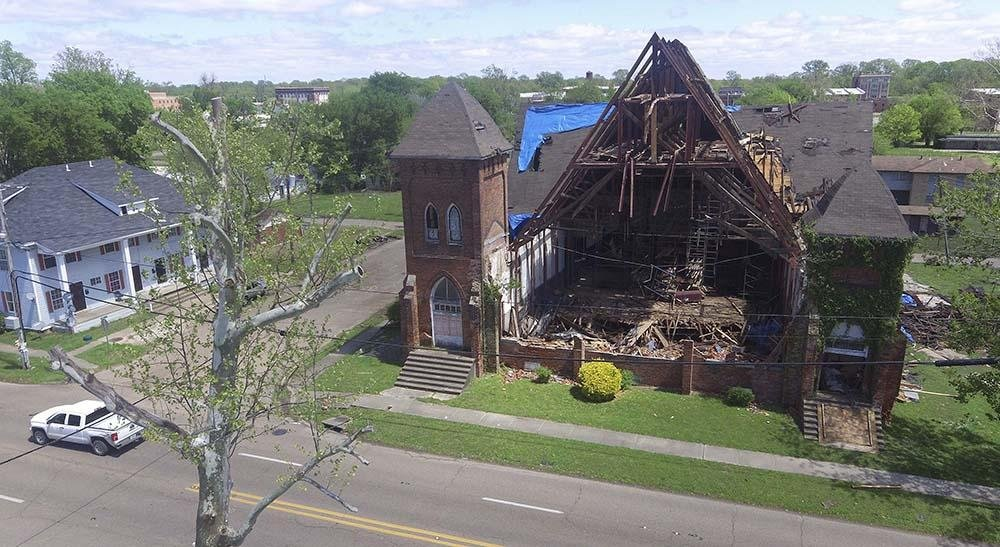
Damage after the 2020 storm

== See also ==
- List of National Historic Landmarks in Arkansas
- National Register of Historic Places listings in Phillips County, Arkansas
