= Elias Camp Morris =

American minister, politician, and businessman

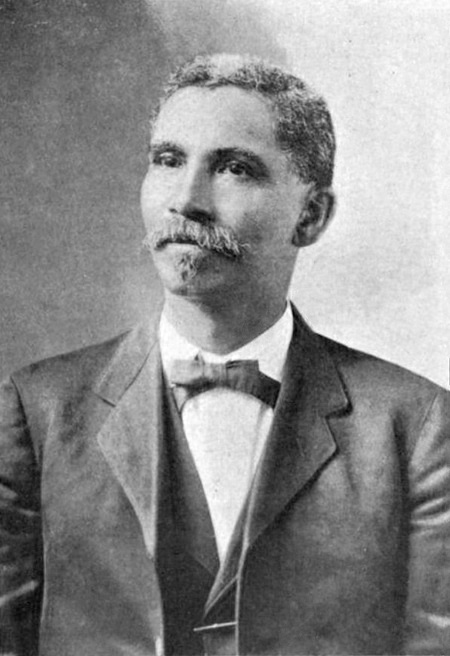
- Born: May 7, 1855; Murray County, Georgia, US
- Died: September 5, 1922 (aged 67); Little Rock, Arkansas, US
- Burial place: Dixon Cemetery, Phillips County, AR
- Education: Nashville Normal and Theological Institute
- Occupations: Minister, businessman, political activist
- Known for: Founder of National Baptist Convention, USA, Inc.

Elias Camp Morris (May 7, 1855 – September 5, 1922) was an American minister, politician, and businessman. Born a slave, Morris attended seminary then preached at Centennial Baptist Church in Helena, Arkansas. He rose to prominence among black Baptists, leading the Foreign Missionary Convention. When the convention merged with two other black Baptist organizations in 1895, Morris became the president of the resulting National Baptist Convention, leading it for twenty-seven years. Morris was also active in the Arkansas Republican Party, serving as a national delegate three times, and co-founded the Arkansas Baptist College.

== Early life ==
Elias Camp Morris was born into slavery on May 7, 1855, near Spring Place, Georgia, to James and Cora Cornelia Morris. His father was a literate craftsman and taught Morris how to read and write when he visited twice a week. Following emancipation, Morris attended schools in Chattanooga, Tennessee, Dalton, Georgia, and Stevenson, Alabama. Both of his parents died by the time Morris was fourteen. Morris supported himself by working as a shoemaker from 1872 to 1886. In 1874, he enrolled in the Nashville Normal and Theological Institute and received a license to preach in the Baptist church.

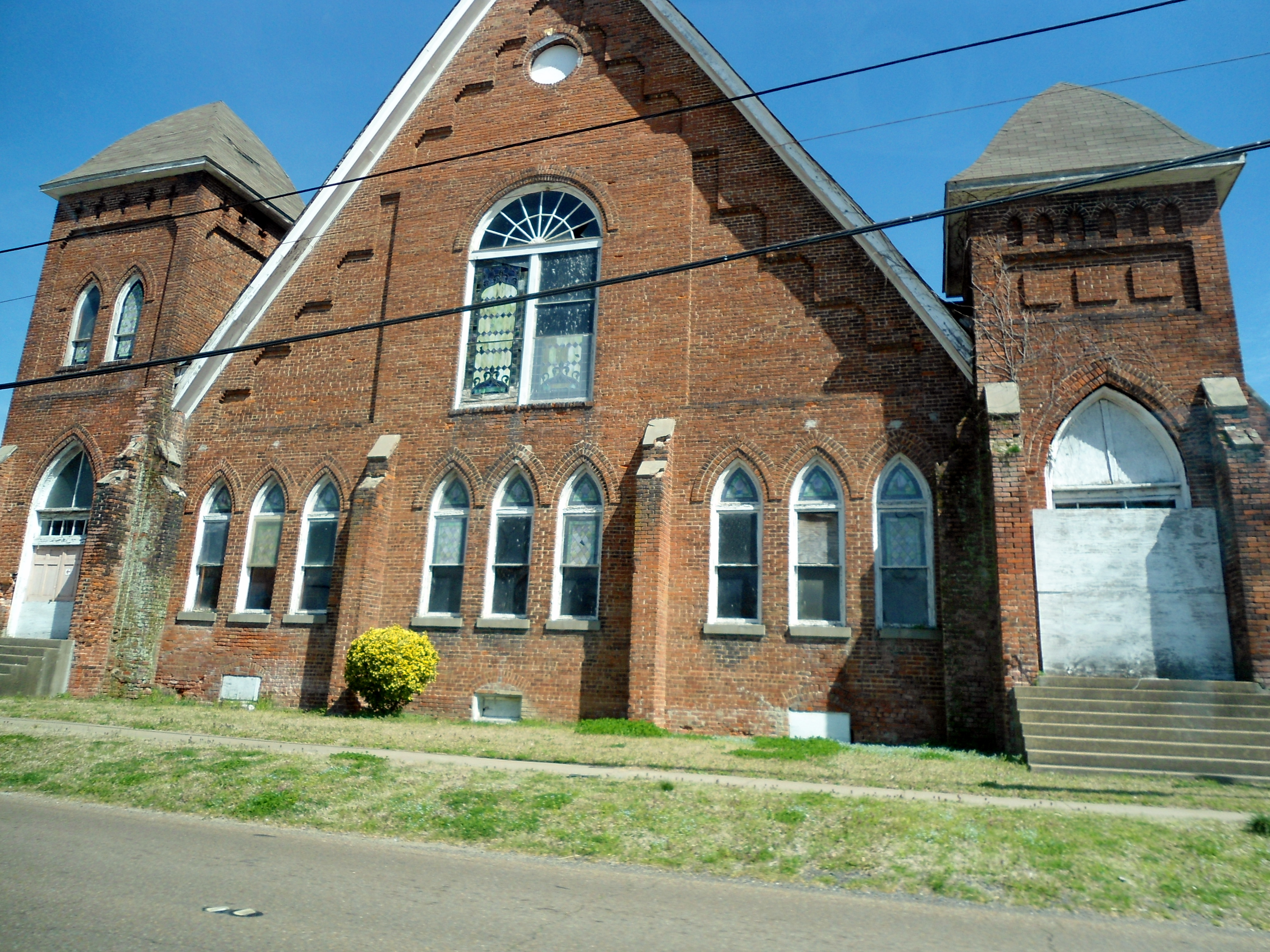
Centennial Baptist Church in Helena, Arkansas. Morris led the congregation from 1879 until his death.

In 1877, Morris set out to find opportunity in Kansas, but instead settled in Helena, Arkansas. Two years later he was named pastor of Centennial Baptist Church. Morris was the secretary of the Arkansas Baptist State Convention from 1880 to 1881, where he founded the Arkansas Times (later The Baptist Vanguard). Morris co-founded a black seminary in Little Rock, later known as the Arkansas Baptist College, in 1884.

Morris was named the first president of the National Baptist Convention (NBC) in 1895, a role that he served for the rest of his life. The NBC had been formed that year after the merger of three black Baptist organizations, including the Foreign Missionary Convention, which Morris had led. By 1900, the convention represented over 60 percent of African American churchgoers. Afterward he was named to the executive committee of the Baptist World Alliance and was vice president of the Federal Council of Churches of Christ. Morris associated with Booker T. Washington through mutual work in the National Negro Business League. At the time of his death, the NBC was the largest black denomination in America with over two million members.

In 1908, President Theodore Roosevelt named Morris an emissary to the Congo Free State to investigate abuses committed against natives. Arkansas governor Charles Hillman Brough recruited Morris as one of his "One Hundred Speakers" to tour the state and recruit soldiers for World War I. Brough also consulted with Morris following the Elaine massacre during the Red Summer of 1919.

== Personal life ==
Morris married Fannie E. Austin on November 27, 1884. They had five children. He received an honorary Doctorate of Divinity from the University of Louisville in 1892 and an honorary Doctor of Philosophy from Alabama A&M University in 1902. Morris was also an early leader in the Arkansas Republican Party, serving as a delegate to the Republican National Convention in 1884, 1888, and 1904; later nominations were blocked by white supremacists in his later years. Morris died after a long illness in Little Rock on September 5, 1922, and was buried in Helena's Dixon Cemetery. In 2003 Centennial Baptist Church was recognized as a National Historic Landmark by the National Park Service.

== Publications ==
- Morris, E.C. Reflections from the Public Services of E. C. Morris, D. D.: Sermons, Addresses and Reminiscences and Important Correspondence, With a Picture Gallery of Eminent Ministers and Scholars. Nashville: National Baptist Publishing Board, 1901.

== See also ==
- Morris Memorial Building
