= Joseph Albert Booker =

American editor, college president (1859–1926)

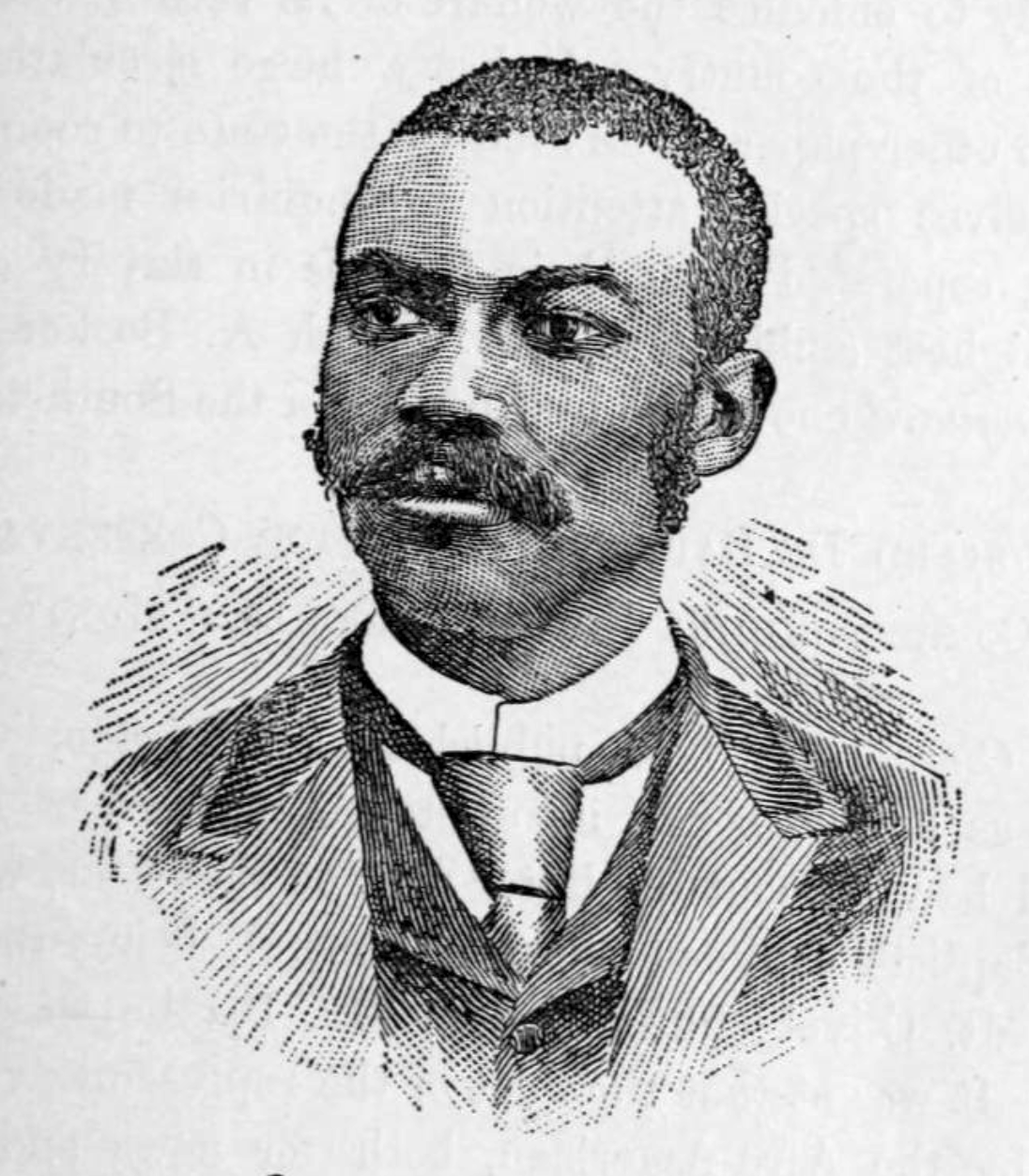

President of Arkansas Baptist College
- In office 1887–1926

Personal details
- Born: December 26, 1859 Old Portland (now Ashley County), Arkansas
- Died: September 9, 1926 (aged 66) Fort Worth, Texas, U.S.
- Resting place: Haven of Rest Cemetery, Little Rock, Arkansas, U.S.
- Spouse: Mary Jane Caver
- Children: 8
- Education: Arkansas Agricultural, Mechanical, and Normal College, Nashville Normal and Theological Institute
- Occupation: Newspaper editor, college president, academic administrator, educator, Baptist minister, activist, Black community leader
- Nickname(s): J.A. Booker, Jos. A. Booker

Rev. Joseph Albert Booker (1859–1926), was an American newspaper editor, academic administrator, educator, minister, activist, and Black community leader. He was born into slavery and orphaned at a young age; Booker went on to serve as the president of Arkansas Baptist College and editor of the Arkansas state’s Black Baptist newspaper, The Baptist Vanguard.

== Early life and family ==
Joseph Albert Booker was born into slavery on December 26, 1859, in Old Portland in Ashley County, Arkansas (east of modern Portland, Arkansas). He was the child of Mary (née Punchardt) and Albert Booker, both were enslaved by John P. Fisher of the Bayou Bartholomew plantation. When he was one year old, his mother Mary died. His father Albert died when he was three years old, and he is said to have been whipped to death for teaching the other enslaved people to read.

At the end of the American Civil War around 1865, young Booker was placed in the care of his maternal grandmother, Emma Fisher. He was enrolled in some of the earliest public schools that were integrated and allowed Black students.

== Education ==
At the age of either 16 or 17 years old, he became a teacher on the Harris Plantation, located nearby in Ashley County. Around the same time he became a licensed Baptist minister.

He attended the normal school at Arkansas Agricultural, Mechanical, and Normal College (now the University of Arkansas at Pine Bluff), from 1878 until 1881; where he studied under Joseph Carter Corbin. In 1881, he moved to Nashville, Tennessee, to attend the Nashville Normal and Theological Institute (later known as Roger Williams University) he was enrolling in classics and graduated with a bachelor’s degree in May 1886.

== Career ==
After graduation, Booker moved back to Arkansas to work as a Baptist minister. On August 22, 1886, he was ordained as a Baptist minister and was appointed by the State Missionary for the Arkansas Negro Baptist Convention and the American Baptist Missionary Society as minister for the “No. 2” Baptist Church at Portland.

In 1887, he was appointed as the first president of the newly established Arkansas Baptist College. He remained president of the college until his death in 1926. The Baptist Vanguard (formerly The Arkansas Baptist) was an Arkansas Baptist College newspaper, and Booker was managing editor from the fall of 1887.

In 1887, Booker married Mary Jane Caver, who he met at Roger Williams University; and they had eight children.

Booker was one of the leaders in the Black community’s opposition to the Separate Coach Law of 1891, Arkansas' law requiring separate but equal railroad accommodations. He had worked with Booker T. Washington, and had hosted Washington when he visited Little Rock. He served from 1911 to 1913 as Little Rock's Colored Vice Commission, formed to clean up the city’s red light districts. In 1919 after the Elaine massacre, Booker was appointed to the Arkansas Commission on Race Relations by Governor Charles Hillman Brough, a platform he used to promote “interracial justice” for all of the state’s citizens.

== Death and legacy ==
He died of a heart attack on September 9, 1926 in Fort Worth, Texas, while he was traveling to attend the National Baptist Convention in Fort Worth, Texas. A profile of him is included in the books The Afro-American Press and Its Editors (1891).
