= J.P. Runyan House =

Historic house in Arkansas, United States

- J. P. Runyan House
- U.S. National Register of Historic Places
- U.S. Historic district – Contributing property
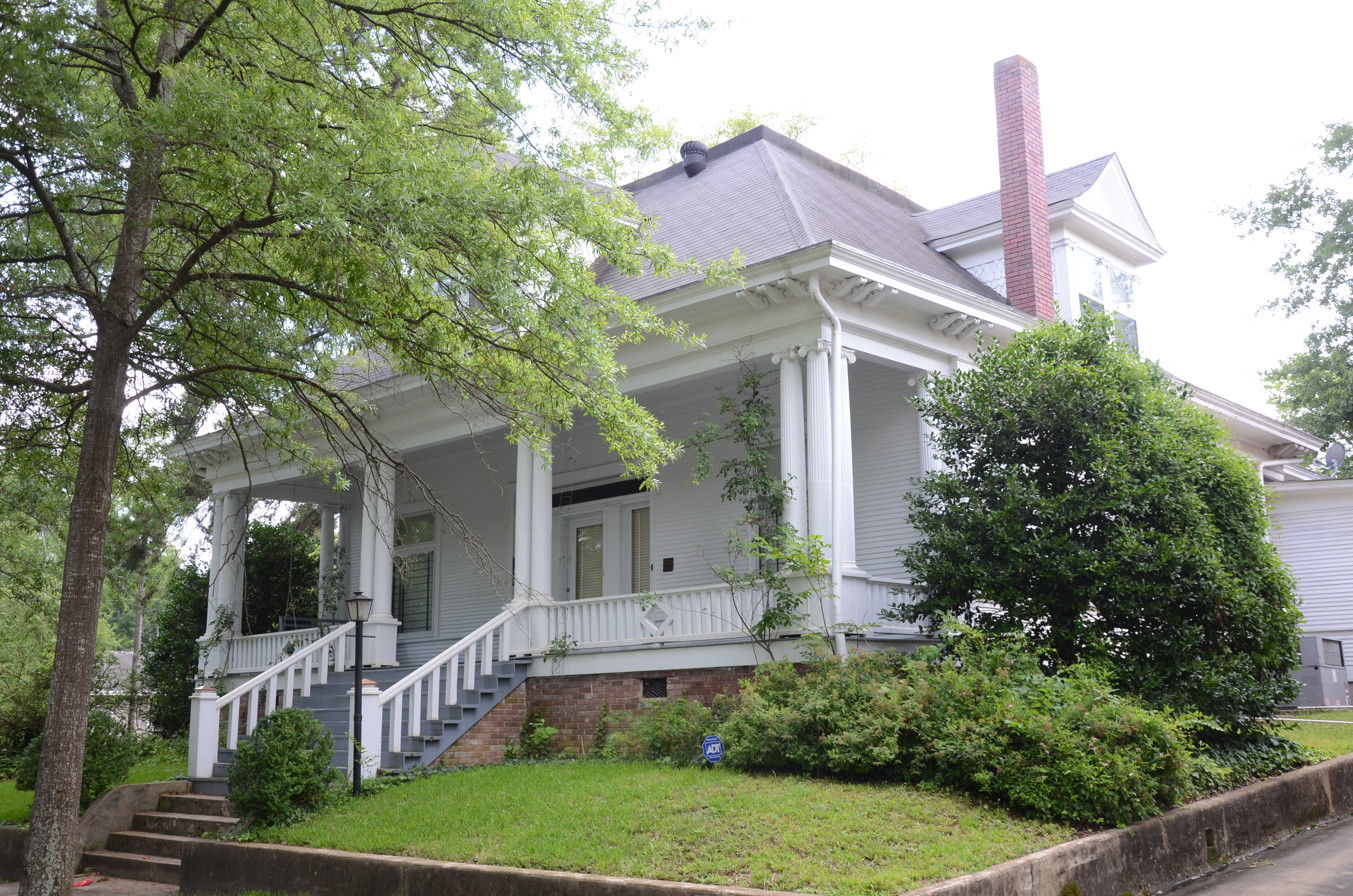

- Location within Arkansas Location within the United States
- Location: 1514 S. Schiller, Little Rock, Arkansas
- Coordinates: 34°44′9″N 92°17′48″W
- Area: less than one acre
- Built: 1901
- Architectural style: Classical Revival
- Part of: Central High School Neighborhood Historic District (ID96000892)
- NRHP reference No.: 92001067

Significant dates
- Added to NRHP: August 18, 1992
- Designated CP: August 16, 1996

The J.P. Runyan House is a historic house at 1514 South Schiller Street in Little Rock, Arkansas. It is a 1 1/2-story wood-frame structure, with a dormered and flared hip roof and weatherboard siding. The roof extends in front over a full-width porch, with Classical Revival columns supporting and matching pilasters at the corners. The roof dormers have gable roofs, and have paired sash windows, with fish-scale cut wooden shingles in the gables and side walls. It was built in 1901 for Joseph P. Runyan, a local doctor, and was later briefly home to Governor of Arkansas John Sebastian Little.

The house was listed on the National Register of Historic Places in 1992.

Construction on the house began in 1900 and when the home was completed, it was occupied by Dr. Joseph P. Runyan and his family, and also where Dr. Runyon operated his medical office. Dr. Runyon was President of the Arkansas State Board of Health during this time, as well as Vice President of Crystal Ice Manufacturing Company.

The house was purchased from the Runyon family in 1920 and sold to another local doctor, who lived in the home with his family.

Ownership of the house changed over the next several decades, with the house eventually being converted from a single family home to housing several apartments by 1941, most of which were occupied by military personnel. This conversion also altered the floorpan of the house, with workers adding a sky light and moving the staircase.

Between 1941 and 2024, the house changed owners roughly 5 times; the most recent owners, Frederic and Ethel Ambrose, bought the house in 1982 and lived in it until their deaths, and the house has remained in the family. The Ambrose's significantly remodeled the house, which had fallen into disrepair, reverting the house from multiple kitchens and apartment units to a single family home. The house now contains 3 bedrooms, 3 bathrooms, one kitchen, two family rooms, a formal dining room, and an upstairs loft area.

The property also contains a carriage house in back of the main house that was used for the Dr. Runyon's horses and staff. The carriage house has since been converted to a 3 car garage and a 2 bedroom apartment unit.

== See also ==
- National Register of Historic Places listings in Little Rock, Arkansas
