= The Baptist Vanguard =

American newspaper

- Type: Bi-weekly newspaper
- School: Arkansas Baptist College
- Founder: Elias Camp Morris
- Editor-in-chief: Elias Camp Morris (1882–1884), Joseph Albert Booker (1887–1926)
- Founded: c. 1882
- City: Little Rock, Arkansas, U.S.
- OCLC number: 28427823

The Baptist Vanguard is a Black Baptist newspaper published in Little Rock, Arkansas, U.S.. It is formerly known as Arkansas Times, and The Arkansas Baptist. It is the longest running African American newspaper in the state of Arkansas; and was founded roughly c. 1882.

The paper was founded as a bi-weekly publication by Elias Camp Morris; who later went on to co-found in 1884 the Arkansas Baptist College in Little Rock. The newspaper is affiliated with the college. Joseph Albert Booker served as the managing editor from 1887 to 1926; as well as served as president of the college.

== See also ==
- List of African American newspapers in Arkansas
