= E. Alice Taylor =

African-American entrepreneur, teacher, and community organizer (1892–1986)

- Born: 1892; Alexander, Arkansas
- Died: January 1, 1986 (aged 94); Boston, Massachusetts
- Education: Arkansas Baptist College (1913)
- Organization: NAACP, Boston Branch (Vice President, board member ); Poro College branch (founder, owner); Professional Hairdressers Association of Massachusetts (founder, President); More: Ebenezer Baptist Church of Boston; Massachusetts State Union of Women's Clubs; Boston Federation of Women's Clubs; League of Women for Community Service; South End Neighborhood Action Program; Charitable Health Association of Massachusetts; Claremont Neighborhood Association; Howard University Mothers and Wives club; Massachusetts Human Relations Committee
- Spouse: Frank Taylor
- Children: 8

E. Alice Taylor (1892–January 1, 1986, age 94) was an African-American entrepreneur, teacher, and community organizer who was an officer and board member of the Boston, Massachusetts NAACP for 50 years. In 1927 she founded a branch of Annie Malone's Poro School and Beauty Shoppe, which she ran for 15 years, until it was closed at the start of World War II. The school had grown to become one of New England's largest minority-owned businesses, with a staff of 15 teaching 150 students each year. She was a member of numerous community service organizations.
