= Bayou Bartholomew =

Waterway in Arkansas and Louisiana, US

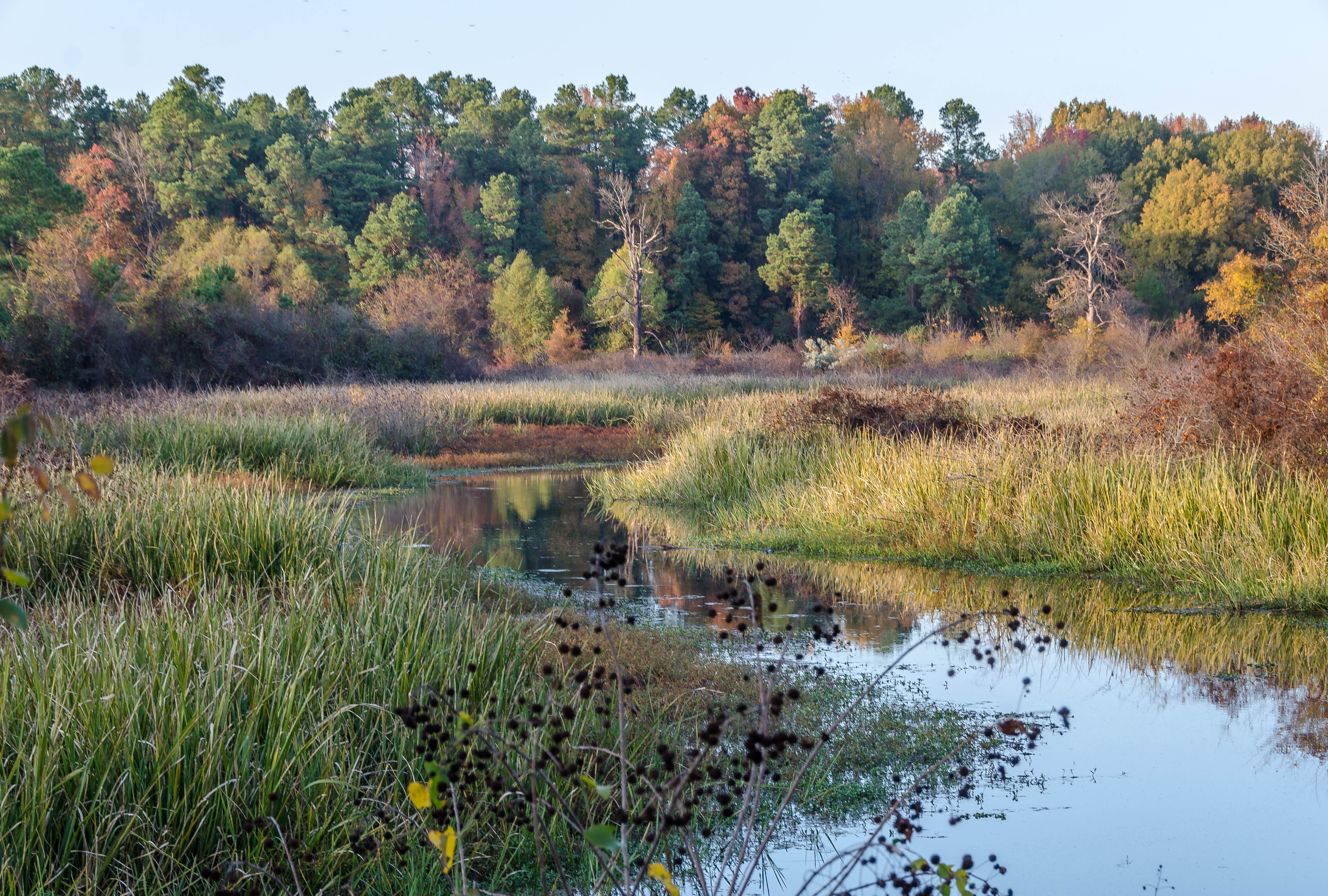
- Bayou Bartholomew near Pine Bluff, Arkansas
- Bayou Bartholomew

Location
- Country: United States
- States: Arkansas; Louisiana
- Counties: Jefferson; Lincoln; Desha; Drew; Ashley
- Parishes: Morehouse; Ouachita

Physical characteristics
- Source
  - coordinates: 34°17′01″N 92°10′11″W
- Mouth: Ouachita River
  - coordinates: 32°43′22″N 92°03′50″W
- Length: 364 miles (586 km)

Bayou Bartholomew is the longest bayou in the world, meandering approximately 364 miles (586 km) in the U.S. states of Arkansas and Louisiana.

It starts northwest of the city of Pine Bluff, Arkansas, in the Hardin community, winds through parts of Jefferson, Lincoln, Desha, Drew, Chicot, and Ashley counties in Arkansas, and Morehouse Parish, Louisiana, and eventually enters the Ouachita River after passing the northernmost tip of Ouachita Parish, near Sterlington, Louisiana. The bayou serves as the primary border separating the Arkansas Delta from the Arkansas Timberlands.

== About ==
It contains over 100 aquatic species making it the second most diverse stream in North America. Known for its excellent bream, catfish, and crappie fishing, portions of the bayou are considered some of the best kept secrets of Arkansas anglers. At Beekman, Louisiana, the bayou has a mean annual discharge of 1,985 cubic feet per second.

== History ==
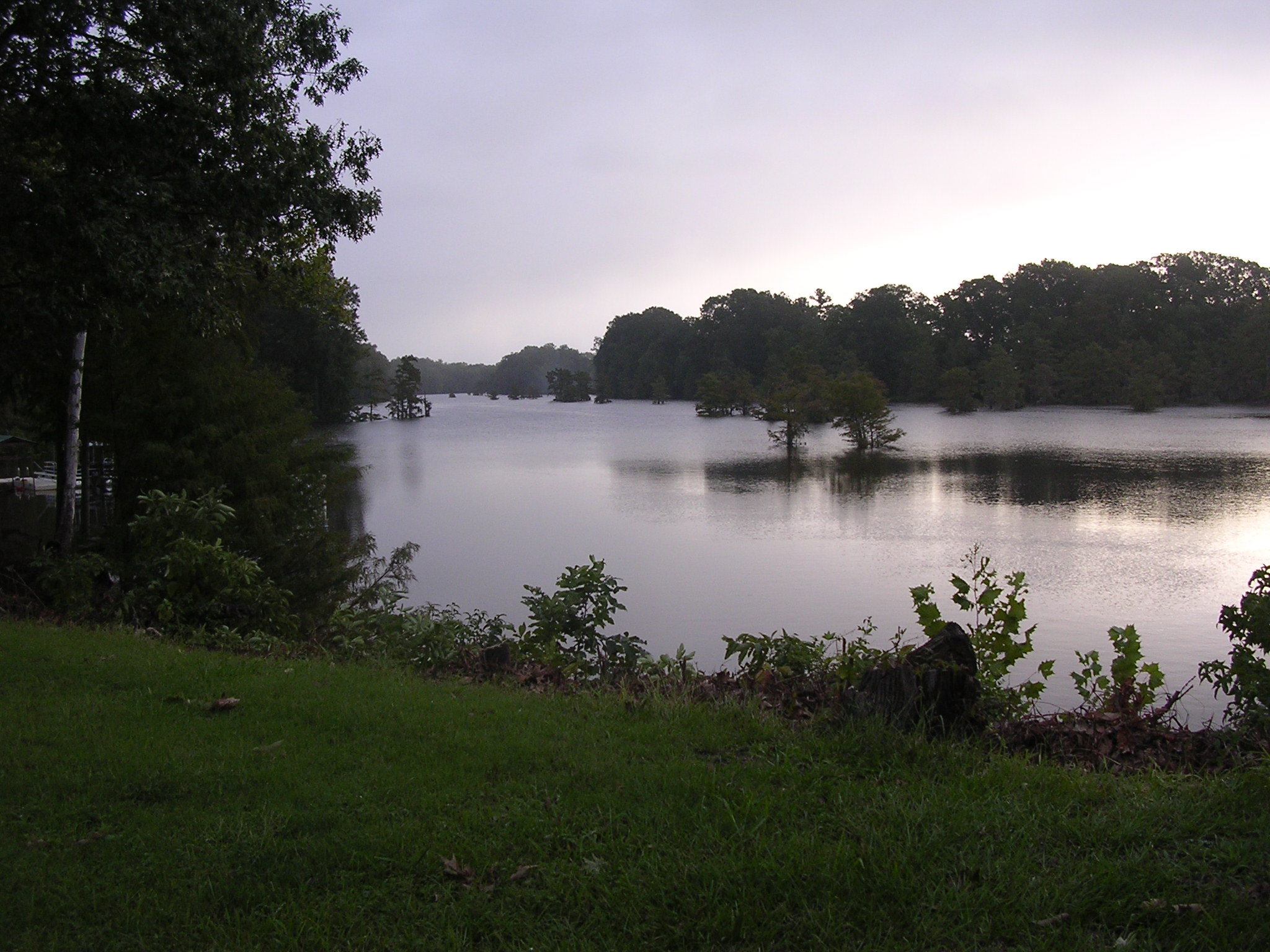
Bayou Bartholomew

=== Origin of the Name Bartholomew ===
The Bayou gains its name from the French colonial Barthélémy family, who lived and traveled throughout the Arkansas post and Ouachita post region in the 18th century.Members of the Barthélémy family hunted, traded and traveled along the bayou and eventually settled near the headwaters of the bayou in modern day Jefferson county. The first example of the name being referenced comes from a 1781 Spanish era document.

=== Use as an Early Transportation Corridor ===
During the French and Spanish colonial period served as an important transportation route that linked the Arkansas post and Ouachita River area in Louisiana. French and Metis families used the Bayou as a travel route for moving between hunting territories and trade centers like along the Arkansas River. Historian and former federal Judge Morris S. Arnold notes that families like the Barthélémy clan traveled extensively through this corridor throughout the 18th century. This continued into the early 19th century, where early American settlers used the bayou and establish homesteads along the natural levies of the bayou. Later, in the 19th century the bayou would carry small steamboats, flatboats and the downstream movement of timber until railroads would later come to dominate.

The present bayou bed was formed by the waters of the Arkansas River during a period when it was constantly changing courses. Approximately 1,800 to 2,200 years ago, the river diverted from the present area of the bayou, and the leisurely bayou began to develop in the old river bed. Prior to construction of railroad lines in the area in the late 19th century, it was the most important stream for transportation in the interior Delta. Dr. Charles McDermott and his brother from the Bayou Sara in Louisiana developed a plantation on the site in 1844. The bayou allowed the development of one of the richest timber and agricultural industries in the Delta area.

The John P. Fisher House (or Moats House) was once a plantation worked by enslaved black people, located alongside the shores of Bayou Bartholomew.

Once a pristine stream, it is now polluted, log-jammed, and over-sedimented in certain sections. In 1995, Curtis Merrell of Monticello in Drew County organized the Bayou Bartholomew Alliance to "restore and preserve the natural beauty" of the bayou. With help from the Alliance, many government organizations (such as the Arkansas Game and Fish Commission, Arkansas Soil and Water Conservation Commission, Arkansas Department of Environmental Quality, USDA Natural Resources Conservation Service, Environmental Protection Agency, U.S. Fish and Wildlife Service), Ducks Unlimited, and the public, the bayou may eventually reclaim some of its grandeur. Projects underway include monitoring water quality, planting trees for buffer zones, restoring riparian sites ruined by clear-cutting, trash removal, removing log jams, bank stabilization, building boat ramps, and encouraging no-till farming.

== Location ==
Mouth
Confluence with the Ouachita River in Morehouse Parish, Louisiana: 32°43′22″N 92°03′50″W
Source
Jefferson County, Arkansas: 34°17′01″N 92°10′11″W

== See also ==
- List of Louisiana Natural and Scenic Rivers
