= Israel Dunn Jr. =

American psychologist and academic administrator

- Born: September 29, 1946; Camden, Arkansas, U.S.
- Died: October 6, 2010 (aged 64); Little Rock, Arkansas, U.S.
- Occupations: Psychiatrist and academic administrator

Academic background
- Education: Grambling State University, B.A. 1968 San Francisco State University, M.A. 1972; California School of Professional Psychology, Ph.D 1975 Pepperdine University, MBA 1978

Academic work
- Discipline: Psychology
- Sub-discipline: Community, clinical, industiral and organizational
- Institutions: Saint Mary's College of California; South Arkansas Community College; Anniston City Schools Foundation; Arkansas Baptist College

Israel R. Dunn Jr. (September 29, 1946 – October 6, 2010) was an African American psychologist, educator, and academic administrator. He was the president of Arkansas Baptist College from 2002 to 2005.

== Early life ==
Dunn was born in Camden, Arkansas on September 29, 1946. His parents were Vyleria and Israel R. Dunn Sr., the pastor of the St. Paul Baptist Church. Dunn grew up in Arkansas and Louisiana. He graduated from Lincoln High School in Lincoln, Arkansas.

Dunn attended Grambling State University, graduating with a Bachelor of Arts in psychology and sociology in December 1968. While at Grambling State, he joined Phi Beta Sigma fratenrity and was a HEW Student Fellow for a family life project.

Dunn then received an Master of Science in industrial and organizational psychology from San Francisco State University in 1972. He then received a Ph.D. in community and clinical psychology from the California School of Professional Psychology in 1975. He attended Pepperdine University, receiving a Master of Business Administration in 1978.

== Career ==
Dunn was a teacher and counselor with Job Corps. He was the chief consultant and an instructor in youth career and personal development for a joint project of the College of Alameda and Oakland Public School Continuation Schools. While working on his Ph.D., Dunn was the executive director and chief psychologist of the East Oakland Community Health Alliance, a nonprofit organization.

Dunn then founded and was the executive director of the East Oakland Family Health Center, located on 7515 East 14th Street in Oakland, California. In this capacity, he testified before the United States House Committee on Ways and Means, Health Subcommittee in 1979, regarding the need for a national health care system. His practice was a family care facility that provided comprehensive dental, medical, and mental health services.

Dunn was a professor of health services administration at Saint Mary's College of California. He was a professor at the South Arkansas Community College in El Dorado, Arkansas. In 1999, he was the CEO of the Anniston City Schools Foundation in Anniston, Alabama.

Dunn was elected as the twelfth president of Arkansas Baptist College in October 2021, starting the position in February 2022. Dunn tried to reorganize the college with a four-tier plan that addressed enrollment management, facilities planning, internal controls and improved infrastructure, and student service. He resigned from the presidency on May 20, 2005, for unknown reasons.

Dunn was the president of IRA and Associate management consultant company.

== Honors ==
Dunn was a fellow of the National Institute of Mental Health. In 1978, the Governor of California honored Dunn with a Community Service Recognition Award. He also received an Outstanding Services to Education Award from the Oakland Public Schools.

== Personal life ==
Dunn and his wife Pearl had three children: Daphne, Shavon, and Rinaldi. Dunn was a member and minister of counseling at Allen Temple Baptist Church. Later, he lived in Little Rock, Arkansas and was a member of St. John Baptist Church in Little Rock. In May 2008, J P Morgan Chase Bank foreclosed on the Dunns' former home in Anniston, Alabama.

Dunn died in Little Rock on October 6, 2010. He was buried at Mount Zion Baptist Church Cemetery in Dubach, Louisiana.

== See also ==
- List of Phi Beta Sigma members
