= John P. Fisher House =

Historic house in Arkansas, United States

- U.S. National Register of Historic Places
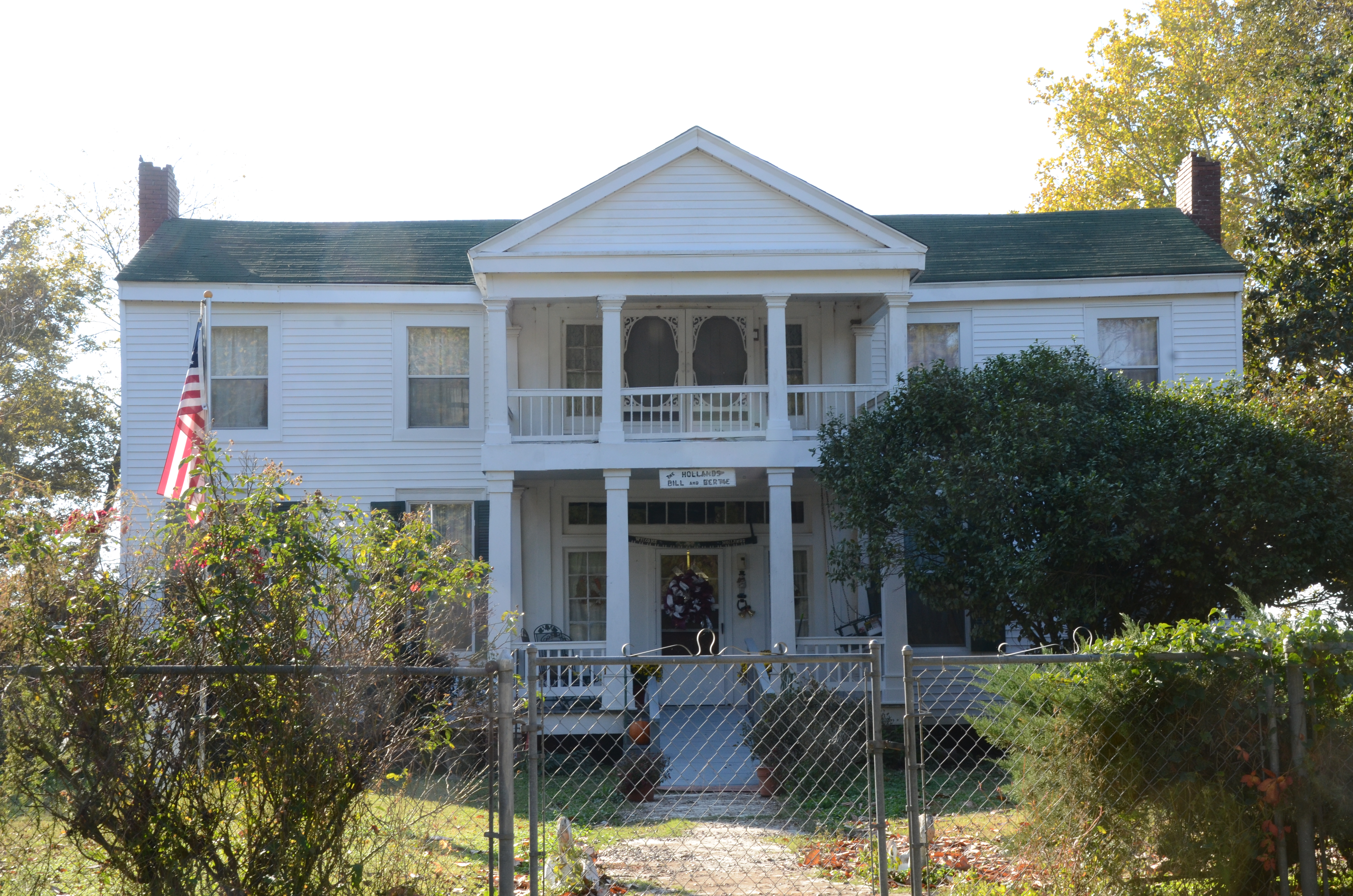

- Location within Arkansas Location within the United States
- Nearest city: Portland, Arkansas
- Coordinates: 33°14′19″N 91°32′16″W
- Area: 2 acres (0.81 ha)
- Built: c. 1850
- Architectural style: Greek Revival
- NRHP reference No.: 95001141
- Added to NRHP: September 29, 1995

The John P. Fisher House is a historic plantation house on the shores of Bayou Bartholomew in Ashley County, Arkansas, west of the city of Portland. The two-story wood frame Greek Revival house is located north of the junction of Arkansas Highway 160 and County Road 50, west of the bayou bridge. It is also known as the Moats House.

The house was listed on the National Register of Historic Places in 1995.

== History ==
It was built c. 1850 for John Fisher, not long after Ashley County was organized, near the town of Alligator Bluff, which was located on the other side of the bayou, and which was later supplanted by Portland with the arrival of the railroad. It once served as a plantation house for Fisher's plantation, which was worked by enslaved people. The property in 1939 still held a slave quarters, a cotton gin, a grist mill, and a blacksmith shop. It is the only known antebellum Greek Revival house in the county.

== See also ==
- National Register of Historic Places listings in Ashley County, Arkansas
- Joseph Albert Booker, formerly enslaved and born on Fisher's plantation
