= Anniston City Schools =

School district in Alabama

Address
- 4804 McClellan Boulevard Anniston, Calhoun County, AL, 36206; United States

District information
- Type: Public
- Motto: Empowering our students to win
- Grades: PK-12
- Established: 1909; 117 years ago
- Superintendent: Dr. D. Ray Hill
- Schools: 5
- NCES District ID: 0100090

Students and staff
- Students: 1,898 ^{('20-'21)}
- Teachers: 100.34 ^{('20-'21)}
- Staff: 98.23 ^{('20-'21)}
- Student–teacher ratio: 18.92 ^{('20-'21)}

Other information
- Website: Official website

Anniston City Schools is the public school district of Anniston, Alabama. Anniston City Schools serves 1,898 students and employs 100 teachers and 98 staff as of the 2020–2021 school year. The district includes three elementary schools, one middle school, and one high school.

== Schools ==
Anniston City Schools consists of five schools:

- Cobb Preparatory Academy (PK-K)
- Golden Springs Elementary School (1-5)
- Randolph Park Elementary School (1-5)
- Anniston Middle School (6-8)
- Anniston High School (9-12)

The district's Tenth Street Elementary School was closed in 2021.

== School Board ==
Name	Position
Robert L. Houston	President
Dr. Mary Harrington	Vice-President
Becky Brown	Member
Joan Frazier	Member
Trudy Munford	Member

== Failing schools ==
Statewide testing ranks the schools in Alabama. Those in the bottom six percent are listed as "failing." As of early 2018, Anniston High School was included in this category.

== Continuing Improvement Program ==
Anniston City Schools have adopted a Continuing Improvement Program to monitor Adequate Yearly Progress (AYP) under the No Child Left Behind initiative. For school year 2010–2011, the High School made adequate yearly progress in math but not in reading. In grades 6 through 8 it was the other way round. In grades 3 through 5 the goals were not met in either reading or math.

== Five-year strategic plan ==
The system has a five-year strategic plan designed to address perceived shortcomings such as poor facilities, lack of discipline, lack of community support, inadequate funding, and an emphasis on athletics at the expense of academic progress. The top priorities were seen as improving test scores, boosting community and business involvement, and improving relationships between parents and teachers.

== Sports ==
Anniston High School's basketball coach since 1997 has been Schuessler L. Ware, named Alabama State 4-A Coach of the Year for 2011.

== Discipline ==
In December 2004 the School Board decided to retain the use of corporal punishment. Under the policy, principals and teachers may paddle students for minor or intermediate violations of the disciplinary code.

At Anniston High School, only the Principal or Vice Principal may spank students. Parents who do not wish corporal punishment to be used must sign a form asking that some other penalty be applied.

In academic year 2008-09 there were 528 disciplinary paddlings in the Anniston schools system, none of which occurred at the High School.
