= Charles McDermott (inventor) =

American physician (1808–1884)

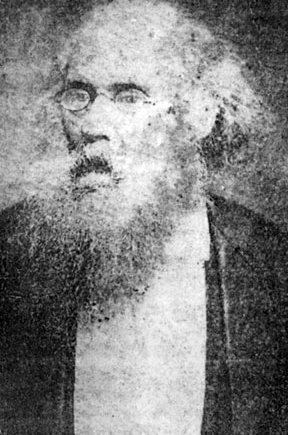
Charles M. McDermott

Charles M. McDermott (September 22, 1808 – October 13, 1884) was an American medical doctor and inventor. He was granted what is believed to be the first known patent for a non-powered airplane, in 1872.

McDermott, the son of Pulling and Emily (Ozan) McDermott, was born in West Feliciana Parish, Louisiana, in 1808 and from St. Francisville, in that parish, entered Yale College in 1825 and graduated in 1828. He adopted medicine as a profession, and after practicing in his native parish. He then moved to Chicot County, in southeastern Arkansas, in 1842, where he made a considerable fortune as a cotton-planter, but lost it all by the American Civil War, in which also some of his sons were killed. He resented bitterly to the last the abolition of slavery and the triumph of the North.

He made several inventions (such as a flying machine, a cotton-picker, and a hollow wedge) which were patented. He was an elder in the Presbyterian Church. He died of heart-disease, at his home, Derrnott Station, Chicot County, Arkansas, October 13, 1884, in his 76th year.

He married in St. Francisville, in 1833, Hittie S. Smith, by whom he had sixteen children, seven of whom survived him. His wife died in 1880.

This article incorporates public domain material from the 1886 Yale Obituary Record.
