= Arkansas Baptist College =

Private college in Little Rock, Arkansas, U.S.

- Former name: Minister's Institute (1884–1885)
- Type: Private historically black college
- Established: 1884
- Religious affiliation: Baptist
- President: Leslie Rodriguez-McClellon
- Students: 373
- Location: Little Rock, Arkansas, United States; 34°44′6″N 92°17′26″W
- Newspaper: The Baptist Vanguard
- Colors: Purple & White
- Nickname: Buffaloes
- Sporting affiliations: NAIA – Continental
- Mascot: Buffalo
- Website: www.arkansasbaptist.edu
- Old Main Building, Arkansas Baptist College
- U.S. National Register of Historic Places
- U.S. Historic district – Contributing property
- Location within Arkansas Location within the United States
- Location: 1600 Dr. Martin Luther King Jr. Dr., Little Rock, Arkansas
- Area: less than one acre
- Built: 1893
- Part of: Central High School Neighborhood Historic District (ID96000892)
- NRHP reference No.: 76000457

Significant dates
- Added to NRHP: April 30, 1976
- Designated CP: August 16, 1996

Arkansas Baptist College (ABC) is a private Baptist-affiliated historically black college in Little Rock, Arkansas. Founded in 1884 as the Minister's Institute, while later renaming it to its current name in April 1885, ABC was initially funded by the Colored Baptists of the State of Arkansas. It is the only historically black Baptist school west of the Mississippi River. The Main Building on its campus, built in 1893, is one of the oldest surviving academic buildings in the state, and was listed on the National Register of Historic Places in 1976.

== History ==
The college was founded in 1884 as the Minister's Institute, and was initially funded by the Colored Baptists of the State of Arkansas. The first principal and teacher was J.P. Lawson, a white Baptist minister from Joplin, Missouri.

Joseph Albert Booker, the first president, served from 1887 until his death in 1926. He was formerly enslaved and a newspaper editor. Booker was an influential educator and he actively fought against the segregationist policies in Little Rock.

Shortly after Booker became president, the Arkansas Baptist College acquired land at the southwest corner of 16th Street and High Street (now MLK Street), where they built wooden structures that burned down on March 2, 1893. The campus remained at that site, and the cornerstone for the Old Main building was laid on November 2, 1893, but it took several years to complete the building.

The campus has changed over the years. In 1913, it included a 3-story boys dormitory, a manual training building, and the president's home. In the 1930s, the campus added an education building which housed the library, classrooms, offices, The Baptist Vanguard newspaper print shop, the business department, and the biology room. By 1950, the campus included Old Main, the education building, the boys dormitory, an administration building, gymnasium, and two more classroom buildings.

=== Accreditation ===
In 1947, during the tenure of president Coggs, the college received its initial two-year accreditation from the Arkansas State Department of Education.

Arkansas Baptist College was accredited by the Higher Learning Commission in 1987. In February 2014, the Commission placed the college on notice that it was at risk for being out of compliance with the commission's criteria for accreditation. The following year, the commission gave the college a "Show-Cause" order to present a case that its accreditation should not be withdrawn. The order was withdrawn in November 2016. The commission placed the college on probation in 2019 for failing to meet the accreditation criterion that requires the institution to have adequate resources. In 2022, the college was placed on a three-year probation again.

== Old Main Building ==
Old Main (built 1893), the college's administration building, is the oldest building in the state of Arkansas established for the purpose of educating Black students. Initially, Old Main building housed the kitchen, dining hall, and the home economics department in the basement; offices for the president, the registrar, the business manager, and the dean, as well as the chapel and the girls’ dormitory on the second and third floors. The building was topped by a bell tower, used to signal class periods; however in 1965 the original bell tower was removed.

The Old Main Building is listed on the National Register of Historic Places since 1976 and is part of the Central High School Neighborhood Historic District. It was added to the NRHP because it is the oldest building on a historically African-American college campus in the state of Arkansas, and because it is an excellent example of Second Empire-style architecture.

Undergraduate demographics as of Fall 2023
Race and ethnicity	Total
Black	91%
Hispanic	5%
Two or more races	2%
International student	1%
Unknown	1%
White	1%
Economic diversity
Low-income (Note: The percentage of students who received an income-based federal Pell grant intended for low-income students.)	54%
Affluent (Note: The percentage of students who are a part of the American middle class at the bare minimum.)	46%

== Presidents ==
- Joseph P. Lawson, (principal) 1884 to 1887
- Joseph Albert Booker, (first president) 1887 to 1926
- S. P. Nelson, 1926 to 1937
- R. C. Woods, 1926 to 1937
- S. R. Tillinghast, 1926 to 1937
- Tandy Washington Coggs, 1937 to 1955
- Oscar Allan Rogers, 1955 to 1962
- Charles E. Johnson, 1955 to 1962
- Howard Johnson, 1955 to 1962
- P. L. Rowe, 1955 to 1962
- James C. Oliver, 1962 to 1982
- R. C. Davis, 1962 to 1982
- William Thomas Keaton, 1985 to 2001
- Mary R. Jarrett, 2001
- Israel Dunn Jr., 2002 to 2005
- Mary R. Jarrett, 2005 to 2006
- Omon Fitzgerald Hill, 2006 to 2016
- Joseph L. Jones, 2016 to January 2018
- Howard O. Gibson, interim January 2018 to August 2018
- Regina H. Favors, interim September 2018 to 2020
- Carlos R. Clark, 2020 to 2021
- Regina H. Favors, interim 2021 to 2022
- Calvin McFadden Sr., January 2023 to 2024
- Leslie Rodriguez-McClellon, November 2024 to present

== Athletics ==
The Arkansas Baptist athletic teams are called the Buffaloes. The college is a member of the National Association of Intercollegiate Athletics (NAIA), primarily competing as an NAIA Independent within the Continental Athletic Conference since the 2021–22 academic year, with its men's wrestling team competing in the Sooner Athletic Conference (SAC), while its football team competes in the SAC since the 2023 fall season (2023–24 academic year).

Prior to joining the NAIA, the Buffaloes were a member of the Bi-State Conference (Bi-State) within the National Junior College Athletic Association (NJCAA) until after the 2020–21 school year.

Arkansas Baptist competes in ten intercollegiate varsity sports: Men's sports include baseball, basketball, football, soccer, track & field and wrestling; while women's sports include basketball, soccer, softball and track & field.

== Notable alumni ==
Notable alumni of Arkansas Baptist College include:

- William T. Dixon, preacher
- Michael Dyer, football player
- Louis Jordan, musician
- Harry Kenyon, baseball player
- James Charles Lewis, III (Lil' JJ), entertainer
- Lorenzo P. Lewis, mental health advocate
- E. Alice Taylor, activist
