= Central High School Neighborhood Historic District =

Historic district in Arkansas, United States

- U.S. National Register of Historic Places
- U.S. Historic district
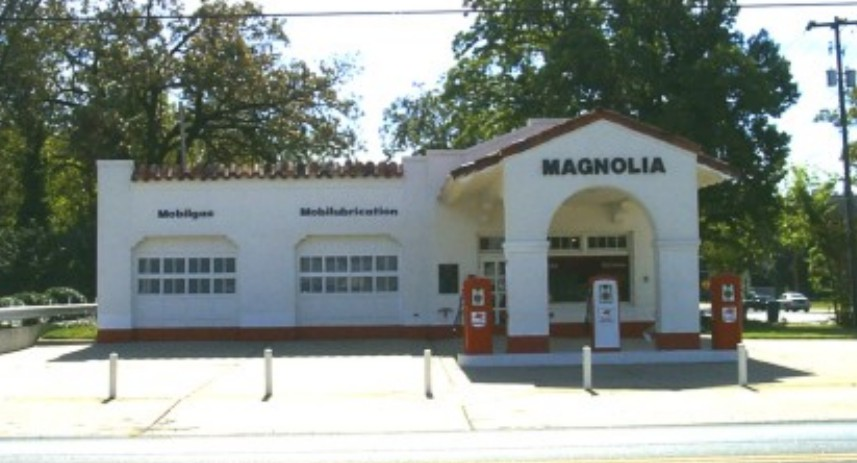

- Location within Arkansas Location within the United States
- Location: Roughly bounded by MLK Dr., Thayer Ave., W. 12th St., and Roosevelt Rd., Little Rock, Arkansas
- Coordinates: 34°43′56″N 92°17′43″W
- Built: 1870
- Architect: multiple
- Architectural style: Colonial Revival, Bungalow/Craftsman, Tudor Revival
- NRHP reference No.: 96000892 (original); 96001555 (increase 1); 12000320 (increase 2)

Significant dates
- Added to NRHP: August 16, 1996
- Boundary increases: January 17, 1997; June 7, 2012

The Central High School Neighborhood Historic District in Little Rock, Arkansas encompasses the vicinity surrounding Little Rock Central High School. The area was designated to provide historic context to the National Historic Landmark school. Notably, it features the restored Magnolia Gas Station, which played a crucial role as a staging area for the media during the school integration crisis of 1957. Until the early 21st century, this building operated as the National Park Service visitor center for the historic district. Additionally, the neighborhood comprises various residences showcasing architectural styles such as bungalows, Tudor Revival, and Colonial Revival.
