= List of coal-fired power stations in the United States =

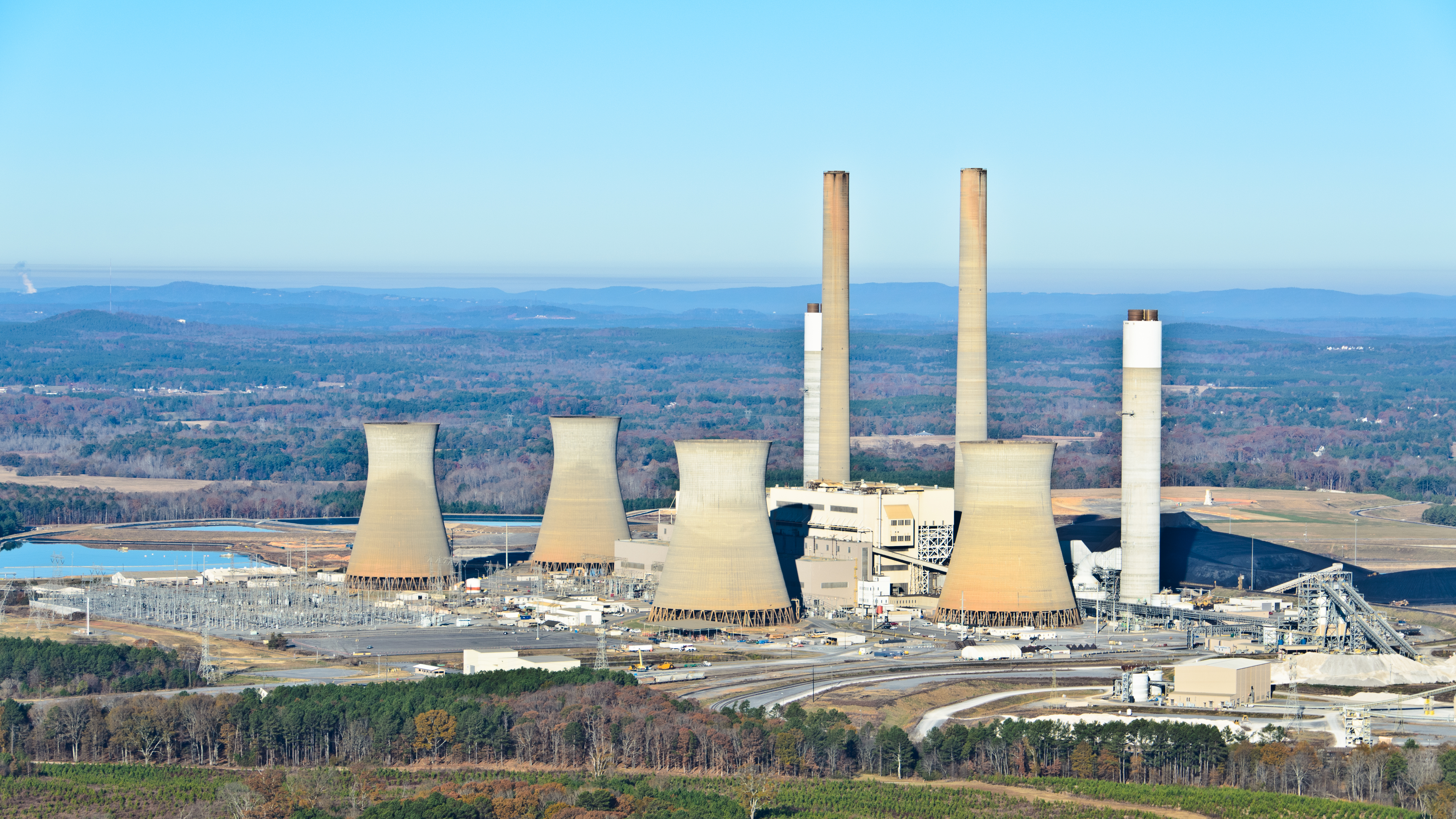
Plant Bowen, the third-largest coal-fired power station in the United States

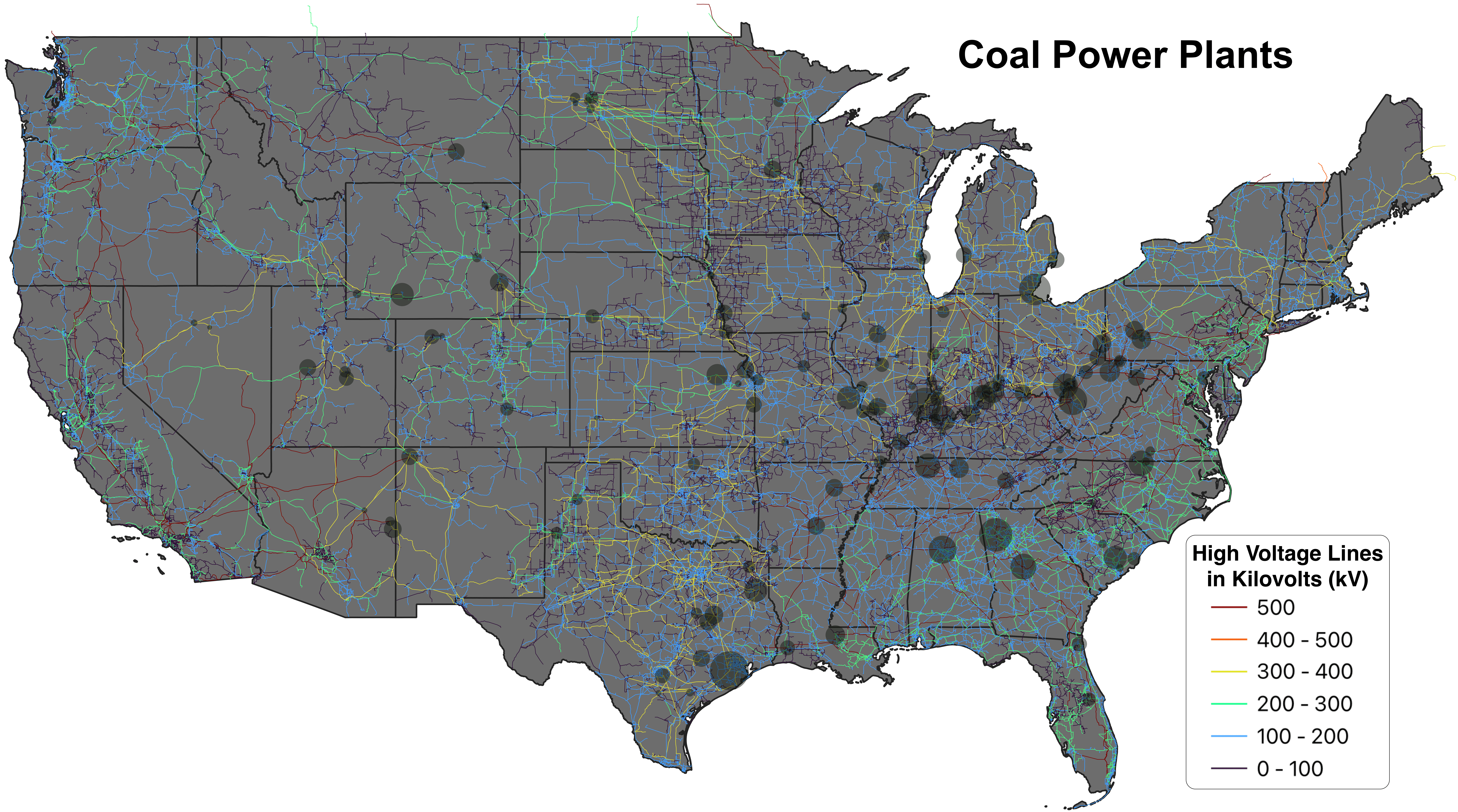
Coal power plants in the United States and high voltage lines

This is a list of the 195 operational coal-fired power stations in the United States.

Coal generated 15% of electricity in the United States in 2024, an amount less than that from renewable energy or nuclear power, and about half of that generated by natural gas plants. Coal was 14% of generating capacity.

Between 2010 and May 2019, 290 coal power plants, representing 40% of the U.S. coal generating capacity, closed. This was mainly due to competition from other generating sources, primarily cheaper and cleaner natural gas, as a result of the fracking boom, which has replaced so many coal plants that natural gas in 2019 accounted for 40% of the total electricity generation in the U.S., as well as the decrease in the cost of renewables. However, some coal plants remain profitable because costs to other people due to the health and environmental impact of the coal industry (estimated to average 5 cents per kWh) are not priced into the cost of generation. Some coal plants are considering only operating during periods of higher electricity demand, from December to February and from June to August. Most plants are expected to close by 2039.

== Coal-fired power stations ==
Go to: A | B | C | D | E | F | G | H | I | J | K | L | M | N | O | P | Q | R | S | T | U | V | W | X | Y | Z |

| Name | State | Location | Capacity (MW) | Capacity factor | Annual generation (GWh) | CO_{2} emissions annual generation (tons/year) | CO2 emissions (tons/GWh) | Owner | Fuel type | Retirement | Ref. |
|---|---|---|---|---|---|---|---|---|---|---|---|
| AES Petersburg | Indiana | 38°31′39″N 87°15′14″W | 2,146 | 48% | 6,141 (2020) | 8,708,619 (2019) | 995 (2019) | AES Indiana | Bituminous coal (Units 3-4) | June 2026 (Unit 3 to be converted to natural gas) December 2026 (Unit 4 to be converted to natural gas) | |
| AES Puerto Rico | Puerto Rico | 17°56′45.4″N 66°09′04.5″W | 454 | | 524 (2022) | | | AES Corporation | Coal | 2028 (planned) (units 1-2) | |
| Allen S. King | Minnesota | 45°01′49.2″N 92°46′45.2″W | 511 | | 761 (2020) | 1,730,280 (2019) | 995 (2019) | Xcel Energy | Sub-bituminous coal | 2028 (All units to be retired) | |
| Antelope Valley | North Dakota | 47°22′14″N 101°50′16″W | 900 | | 5,695 (2020) | 6,557,577 (2019) | 1,075 (2019) | Basin Electric Power Cooperative | Refined coal | | |
| Apache | Arizona | 32°03′40″N 109°53′40″W | 408 | | 2,210 (2020) | 1,458,894 (2019) | 728 (2019) | Arizona Electric Power Cooperative | Natural gas (Unit 2, 204 MW), sub-bituminous coal (Unit 3, 204 MW) | December 31, 2027 (Unit 3 to be converted to natural gas) | |
| Archer Daniels Midland Cedar Rapids | Iowa | 41°55′38″N 91°41′24″W | 256 | | 815 (2020) | 2,319,528 (2019) | 2,207 (2019) | Archer Daniels Midland | Sub-bituminous coal (Units 1-6), natural gas (Unit 7), bituminous coal (Units 1-6) | No plans to retire as of February 2026 | |
| Archer Daniels Midland Clinton | Iowa | 41°48′29″N 90°13′58″W | 180 | | 769 (2020) | 1,652,099 (2019) | 2,143 (2019) | Archer Daniels Midland | Sub-bituminous coal (Units 1A, 2A) | No plans to retire as of February 2026 | |
| Archer Daniels Midland Columbus | Nebraska | 41°24′59″N 97°17′11″W | 71 | | 182 (2020) | 1,018,753 (2019) | 3,477 (2019) | Archer Daniels Midland | Sub-bituminous coal | No plans to retire as of March 2026 | |
| Archer Daniels Midland Decatur | Illinois | 39°51′48″N 88°53′55″W | 335 | | 1,179 (2020) | 3,544,865 (2019) | 2,984 (2019) | Archer Daniels Midland | Bituminous coal, sub-bituminous coal | No plans to retire as of February 2026 | |
| Argus | California | 35°45′54″N 117°22′56″W | 63 | | 317 (2020) | 1,162,275 (2019) | 4,649 (2019) | Searles Valley Minerals | Refined coal (Units 5, 8 & 9) | No plans to retire as of February 2026 | |
| Baldwin | Illinois | 38°12′16″N 89°51′22″W | 1,815 | | 4,046 (2020) | 6,127,543 (2019) | 974 (2019) | Dynegy Midwest Generation | Refined coal (Units 1-2) | 2027 (Units 1-2 to be retired) (Note: Original December 2025 date was pushed back to 2027 on December 17, 2024) | |
| Belews Creek | North Carolina | 36°16′53″N 80°3′37″W | 2,240 | 41% | 5,341 (2020) | 6,215,485 (2019) | 872 (2019) | Duke Energy | Bituminous coal, natural gas | 2035 | |
| Belle River | Michigan | 42°46′26″N 82°29′42″W | 1,664 | | 4,595 (2020) | 5,629,063 (2019) | 970 (2019) | DTE Energy | Refined coal (Units ST1-ST2, 1,260 MW), natural gas (256 MW) | 2026 (Units ST1-ST2 to be converted to natural gas) | |
| Big Bend | Florida | 27°47′45″N 82°24′13″W | 1,821 | 45%–55% (2019) | 3,130 (2020) | 2,955,073 (2019) | 760 (2019) | TECO Energy | Natural gas, bituminous coal (Unit 4, 486MW), solar | January 2045 (Unit 4, end of life) | |
| Big Cajun 2 | Louisiana | 30°43′36″N 91°22′01″W | 1,903 | | 1,282 (2020) | 2,987,086 (2019) | 912 (2019) | Cleco Holdings, Entergy | Sub-bituminous coal and refined coal (Units 1 & 3, 1,276.9 MW), natural gas (Unit 2, 626 MW) | 2025 (units 1 & 3) (Note: While some sources said that all units would either retire or convert to natural gas in 2025, some sources indicate that they are still burning coal as of January 2026.) | |
| Big Stone | South Dakota | 45°18′14″N 96°30′37″W | 451 | | 1,650 (2020) | 2,698,883 (2019) | 1,031 (2019) | Otter Tail Power Company | Sub-bituminous coal | | |
| Biron Mill | Wisconsin | 44°25′48″N 89°46′50″W | 62 | | 164 (2019) | 252,089 (2019) | 1,537 (2019) | ND Paper | Sub-bituminous coal, natural gas | | |
| Bonanza | Utah | 40°05′11″N 109°17′11″W | 500 | | 3,258 (2020) | 3,514,286 (2019) | 940 (2019) | Deseret Power | Bituminous coal | December 2033 | |
| Bowen | Georgia | 34°07′23″N 84°55′13″W | 3,499 | 51% (2019) | 7,969 (2020) | 10,093,816 (2019) | 919 (2019) | Georgia Power | Bituminous coal (Units 1-4) | December 31, 2028 (Units 1-4, legal deadline) | |
| Brame, (Rodemacher 2) | Louisiana | 31°23′49″N 92°43′09″W | 1,702 | | 4,856 (2020) | 5,066,218 (2019) | 1,010 (2019) | Cleco Holdings, Lafayette Utilities System, Louisiana Energy and Power Authority | Sub-bituminous coal (Rodemacher 2, Madison 3), natural gas (Nesbitt 1, Madison 3) petroleum coke (Madison 3), bituminous coal(Madison 3) | 2028 (Rodemacher 2 to be converted to natural gas) 2035 (Nesbitt 1 to reach end of life) | |
| Brandon Shores | Maryland | 39°10′53″N 76°32′16″W | 1,370 | | 951 (2020) | 2,594,657 (2019) | 1,163 (2019) | Talen Energy | Bituminous coal | May 31, 2029 (All units to be retired) | |
| Brunner Island | Pennsylvania | 40°05′44″N 76°41′49″W | 1,567 | 33% (2015) | 1,840 (2020) | 2,150,934 (2019) | 831 (2019) | Talen Energy | Natural gas, bituminous coal | December 31, 2028 (coal) | |
| Canton North Carolina | North Carolina | 35°32′06″N 82°50′36″W | 52.5 | | 309 (2020) | 819,429 (2018) | 2,643 (2018) | Blue Ridge Paper Products | Black liquor, bituminous coal, natural gas, wood | 2023 (Note: Offline (not yet defunct) - The mill in Canton, N.C. has been sold to Two Banks Development to be transformed into industrial, commercial and residential projects. It is unclear if restarting the coal plant is part of the project.) | |
| Cardinal | Ohio | 40°15′7″N 80°38′51″W | 1,800 | 64% | 9,060 (2020) | 8,911,067 (2019) | 924 (2019) | American Electric Power | Bituminous coal | December 2030 (unit 1) | |
| Cayuga | Indiana | 39°55′26″N 87°25′38″W | 1,062 | | 4,378 (2020) | 5,681,919 (2018) | 934 (2018) | Duke Energy | Bituminous coal (Units 1-2) | September 2029 (Unit 1 to be converted to natural gas); May 2030 (Unit 2 to be converted to natural gas) | |
| Centralia | Washington | 46°45′20″N 122°51′36″W | 670 | | 5,149 (2020) | 7,411,136 (2019) | 1,036 (2019) | TransAlta | Refined coal | December 2025 | |
| Chena | Alaska | 64°50′51″N 147°44′02″W | 27.5 | | 187 (2019) | 328,539 (2019) | 1,757 (2019) | Aurora Energy | Lignite (Units 1,2 & 5) | No plans to retire as of February 2026 | |
| Clay Boswell | Minnesota | 47°15′39″N 93°39′14″W | 923 | | 4,203 (2020) | 5,052,620 (2019) | 1,050 (2019) | Minnesota Power | Refined coal (Units 3-4) | 2029 (Unit 3 to be converted to natural gas); 2035 (Unit 4 to cease burning coal) | |
| Clifty Creek | Indiana | 38°44′16″N 85°25′08″W | 1,303 | | 4,375 (2020) | 5,850,082 (2019) | 1,022 (2019) | Ohio Valley Electric Corporation | Bituminous coal (Units 1-6) | No plans to retire as of February 2026 | |
| Clover | Virginia | 36°52′15″N 78°42′11″W | 848 | | 1,241 (2020) | 1,256,360 (2019) | 981 (2019) | Dominion Energy | Bituminous coal | 2035+ (Note: Stated as "until at least the late 2030s") | |
| Coal Creek | North Dakota | 47°22′37″N 101°09′26″W | 1,210 | | 8,218 (2020) | 8,448,452 (2019) | 1,031 (2019) | Rainbow Energy Marketing Corp | Refined coal | | |
| Coleto Creek | Texas | 28°42′48″N 97°12′48″W | 622 | | 2,530 (2020) | | | Dynegy | Refined coal | December 2027 | |
| Colstrip | Montana | 45°53′01″N 106°36′44″W | 740 | | 7,935 (2020) | 14,231,609 (2019) | 1,061 (2019) | Talen Energy,Puget Sound Energy | Sub-bituminous coal | No plans to retire as of March 2026 | |
| Columbia | Wisconsin | 43°29′10″N 89°25′13″W | 1,023 | | 5,187 (2020) | 5,299,998 (2019) | 988 (2019) | Wisconsin Power and Light Company (46.2%), Wisconsin Public Service (31.8%), Madison Gas and Electric (22%) | Refined coal | 2029 | |
| Colver | Pennsylvania | 40°33′14″N 78°47′54″W | 118 | | 767 (2019) | 825,517 (2019) | 1,076 (2019) | Generation Holdings LP | Waste coal | 2028 | |
| Comanche | Colorado | 38°12′30″N 104°34′34″W | 1,635 | 75% | 4,150 (2020) | 8,779,681 (2019) | 1,151 (2019) | Public Service Company of Colorado | Sub-bituminous coal (Units 2-3) | December 31, 2026 (Unit 2 to be retired) (Note: Unit 2 was planned to be retired in December of 2025, but was delayed because of a breakdown in Unit 3 in November that has not yet been fixed), January 1, 2031 (Unit 3 to be retired) | |
| Conemaugh | Pennsylvania | 40°23′05″N 79°03′49″W | 1,872 | 70% | 7,530 (2020) | 9,845,117 (2019) | 895 (2019) | Public Service Enterprise Group | Refined coal, bituminous coal | December 31, 2028 | |
| Cooper | Kentucky | 36°59′N 84°35′W | 341 | | 143 (2020) | 188,137 (2019) | 1,113 (2019) | East Kentucky Power Cooperative | Bituminous coal (Units 1-2) | December 31, 2030 (Unit 1 to be retired) | |
| Cope | South Carolina | 33°22′01″N 81°02′04″W | 417 | | 965 (2020) | 1,352,606 (2019) | 730 (2019) | Dominion Energy | Natural gas, bituminous coal | 2030 | |
| Coronado | Arizona | 34°34′40″N 109°16′23″W | 822 | 54% (2019) | 2,596 (2020) | 2,152,334 (2019) | 1,037 (2019) | Salt River Project | Refined coal (Units 1-2) | December 31, 2029 (Units 1-2 to be converted to natural gas) | |
| Coyote | North Dakota | 47°13′18″N 101°48′56″W | 420 | | 2,386 (2020) | 2,331,579 (2019) | 1,131 (2019) | Otter Tail Power Company (35%), Northern Municipal Power Agency (30%), Montana-Dakota Utilities (25%),NorthWestern Energy (10%) | Lignite | | |
| Craig | Colorado | 40°27′49″N 107°35′28″W | 1,428 | | 6,979 (2020) | 7,924,303 (2019) | 1,000 (2019) | Tri-State Generation and Transmission Association | Sub-bituminous coal (Units 1-3) | December 31, 2025 (Unit 1 to be retired) (Note: The U.S. Department of Energy issued an emergency order on December 30, 2025 to keep this unit open unit March 30, 2026. The order can be extended.), September 30, 2028 (Unit 2 to be retired), December 31, 2028 (Unit 3 to be retired) | |
| Cross | South Carolina | 33°22′9″N 80°6′51″W | 2,390 | 46% | 6,226 (2020) | 7,963,965 (2019) | 951 (2019) | Santee Cooper | Refined coal | 2027 | |
| Crystal River | Florida | 28°57′29″N 82°41′59″W | 1,434 | 45% | 14,948 (2020) | 8,019,144 (2019) | 534 (2019) | Duke Energy | Natural gas, bituminous coal (Units 4-5, 1450MW) | May 2034 (Units 4-5 to be retired) | |
| Cumberland | Tennessee | 36°23′29″N 87°39′17″W | 2,470 | 48% (2019) | 9,527 (2020) | 8,156,435 (2019) | 867 (2019) | Tennessee Valley Authority | Bituminous coal | December 2026 (unit 2), December 2028 (unit 1) | |
| Curtis H. Stanton | Florida | 28°28′56″N 81°09′59″W | 1,820 | 39% | 5,789 (2020) | 5,034,732 (2019) | 815 (2019) | Orlando Utilities Commission | Bituminous coal (Units 1-2, 930MW), natural gas, landfill gas | 2026 (Unit 1 to be retired); 2027 (Unit 2 to be converted to natural gas) (Note: May be delayed) | |
| Dallman | Illinois | 39°45′18″N 89°36′18″W | 437 | | 756 (2020) | 2,024,131 (2019) | 1,092 (2019) | City of Springfield | Bituminous coal (Unit 4) | No plans to retire as of February 2026 | |
| Dave Johnston | Wyoming | 42°50′17″N 105°46′37″W | 816 | | 4,326 (2020) | | | PacifiCorp | Refined coal | January 2027 (unit 3) | |
| D.B. Wilson | Kentucky | 37°45′N 87°08′W | 450 | | 2,317 (2020) | 2,676,758 (2019) | 1,014 (2019) | Big Rivers Electric Corporation | Bituminous coal | No plans to retire as of March 2026 | |
| Deerhaven | Florida | 29°45′32″N 82°23′17″W | 417 | | 646 (2020) | 808,276 (2019) | 1,028 (2019) | Gainesville Regional Utilities (GRU) | Bituminous coal (Unit 2, 235 MW), natural gas (74 MW) | December 2036 (Unit 2) | |
| Dover | Ohio | 40°31′14″N 81°28′04″W | 50 | | 56 (2019) | 81,930 (2019) | 1,463 (2019) | City of Dover | Bituminous coal | | |
| Dry Fork | Wyoming | 44°23′20″N 105°27′39″W | 422 | | 3,205 (2020) | 2,602,745 (2019) | 1,014 (2019) | Basin Electric Power Cooperative | Sub-bituminous coal | | |
| East Bend | Kentucky | 38°54′N 84°51′W | 669 | | 2,274 (2020) | 3,196,702 (2019) | 1,010 (2019) | Duke Energy | Bituminous coal | 2035 | |
| Ebensburg | Pennsylvania | 40°27′18″N 78°44′51″W | 50 | | 236 (2019) | 367,499 (2019) | 1,557 (2019) | Ebensburg Power | Waste coal | 2028 | |
| E C Gaston | Alabama | 33°14′34″N 86°27′40″W | 1,880 | | 3,797 (2020) | 4,324,048 (2019) | 760 (2019) | Alabama Power (50%) Georgia Power (50%) | Natural gas (Units 1-4, 1020MW), bituminous coal (Unit 5, 832MW) | December 31, 2028 (Unit 5 to be converted to natural gas) | |
| Edgewater | Wisconsin | 43°42′56″N 87°42′23″W | 380 | | 1,098 (2020) | 1,461,448 (2019) | 1,024 (2019) | Alliant Energy (majority), WEC Energy Group (minority) | Sub-bituminous coal | December 2025 | . |
| Edwardsport | Indiana | 38°47′51″N 87°15′02″W | 618 | | 3,268 (2020) | 3,853,125 (2019) | 968 (2019) | Duke Energy | Syngas, natural gas, bituminous coal | No plans to retire as of February 2026 | |
| E. W. Brown | Kentucky | 37°47′N 84°43′W | 464 | | 1,282 (2020) | 1,354,729 (2019) | 947 (2019) | Kentucky Utilities | Bituminous coal (Unit 3, 413 MW), natural gas (Units 5-11, 980 MW), solar (10 MW) | No plans to retire as of March 2026 | |
| Fayette | Texas | 29°55′00″N 96°45′06″W | 1,760 | 67% | 8,760 (2020) | 9,753,313 (2019) | 1,015 (2019) | Austin Energy (50%), Lower Colorado River Authority (50%) | Refined coal | | |
| F. B. Culley | Indiana | 37°54′33″N 87°19′30″W | 369 | | 923 (2020) | 1,417,332 (2019) | 1,028 (2019) | Vectren | Bituminous coal (Units 2-3) | December 31, 2025 (Unit 2 to be retired) (Note: The U.S. Department of Energy issued an emergency order on December 23, 2025 to keep this unit open unit March 23, 2026.); No plans to retire Unit 3 as of February 2026 (Note: Plan to convert Unit 3 to natural gas by 2027 was cancelled in October 2025) | |
| Fernandina Beach Mill | Florida | 30°40′54″N 81°27′22″W | 118 | | 612 (2020) | 411,398 (2019) | 649 (2019) | WestRock | Black liquor, natural gas, wood, bituminous coal | No plans to retire as of February 2026 | |
| Flint Creek | Arkansas | 36°15′20″N 94°31′22″W | 528 | | 2,377 (2019) | 2,499,317 (2019) | 1,051 (2019) | Southwestern Electric Power Company (50%), Arkansas Electric Cooperative Corporation (50%) | Sub-bituminous coal (Unit 1) | 2038 (Unit 1 projected retirement date) | |
| Fort Martin | West Virginia | 39°42′37″N 79°55′40″W | 1,098 | | 6,701 (2019) | | | FirstEnergy | Bituminous coal | | |
| Four Corners | New Mexico, Navajo Nation | 36°41′17″N 108°28′37″W | 1,540 | 42% | 8,917 (2019) | 8,303,298 (2019) | 931 (2019) | Arizona Public Service (66%), Southern California Edison (19.2%), others (14.8%) | Sub-bituminous coal | December 2031 (All units to be retired) (Note: Date of retirement may be pushed back to 2038.) | |
| Gallatin | Tennessee | 36°18′53″N 86°24′01″W | 1,576 | | 4,158 (2019) | 4,460,348 (2019) | 1,073 (2019) | Tennessee Valley Authority | Sub-bituminous coal (976 MW), natural gas (600 MW) | December 2031 | |
| General James M. Gavin | Ohio | 38°56′09″N 82°07′00″W | 2,600 | 70% | 13,894 (2019) | 12,949,967 (2019) | 932 (2019) | Lightstone Generation | Refined coal | | |
| George Neal North | Iowa | 42°19′29″N 96°22′48″W | 584 | | 1,628 (2019) | 1,595,182 (2019) | 980 (2019) | MidAmerican Energy (72%), Interstate Power and Light (28%) | Refined coal (Unit 3) | No plans to retire as of February 2026 | |
| George Neal South | Iowa | 42°17′59″N 96°21′42″W | 640 | | 1,544 (2019) | 1,484,993 (2019) | 962 (2019) | MidAmerican Energy (40.57%), Interstate Power and Light (25.7%), others (33.73%) | Refined coal (Unit 4) | No plans to retire as of February 2026 | |
| Gerald Gentleman | Nebraska | 41°04′51″N 101°08′35″W | 1,365 | | 8,401 (2019) | 8,166,750 (2019) | 972 (2019) | Nebraska Public Power District | Sub-bituminous coal | No plans to retire as of March 2026 | |
| Ghent | Kentucky | 38°45′15″N 85°1′17″W | 1,919 | 67% | 10,164 (2019) | 10,471,275 (2019) | 1,030 (2019) | Kentucky Utilities | Refined coal, bituminous coal | No plans to retire as of March 2026 | |
| Gibson | Indiana | 38°22′19″N 87°46′02″W | 3,132 | 60% | 12,184 (2019) | 12,541,361 (2019) | 1,029 (2019) | Duke Energy (90.3%), IMPA (4.87%), WVPA (4.87%) | Bituminous coal (Units 1-5) | 2030 (Unit 5 to be retired); 2032 (Units 3-4 to be converted to natural gas); 2038 (Units 1-2 to be retired) | |
| Grant Town | West Virginia | 39°33′37″N 80°09′46″W | 95.7 | | 598 (2019) | | | American Bituminous | Waste coal | | |
| Harrison | West Virginia | 39°23′02″N 80°19′52″W | 1,984 | | 12,894 (2019) | 12,187,539 (2019) | 945 (2019) | FirstEnergy | Refined coal | | |
| Hawthorn | Missouri | 39°07′51″N 94°28′40″W | 1,046 | | 3,092 (2019) | 3,028,125 (2019) | 979 (2019) | Kansas City Power and Light Company | Sub-bituminous coal | No plans to retire as of March 2026 | |
| Hayden | Colorado | 40°29′14″N 107°11′08″W | 441 | | 2,571 (2019) | 2,612,504 (2019) | 1,016 (2019) | XcelEnergy | Bituminous coal (Units 1-2) | December 31, 2027 (Unit 2 to be retired), December 31, 2028 (Unit 1 to be retired) | |
| Healy | Alaska | 63°51′15″N 148°57′00″W | 93 | | 345 (2019) | 463,902 (2019) | 1,345 (2019) | Golden Valley Electric | Lignite, waste coal | No plans to retire as of February 2026 | |
| Holcomb | Kansas | 37°55′51″N 100°58′21″W | 349 | | 1,570 (2019) | 1,650,017 (2019) | 1,051 (2019) | Sunflower Electric | Sub-bituminous coal | No plans to retire as of March 2026 | |
| Hugh L. Spurlock | Kentucky | 38°41′55″N 83°49′0″W | 1,346 | | 5,890 (2019) | 5,969,595 (2019) | 1,014 (2019) | East Kentucky Power Cooperative | Bituminous coal | No plans to retire as of March 2026 | |
| Hugo | Oklahoma | 34°00′49″N 95°19′32″W | 446 | | 576 (2019) | 642,062 (2019) | 1,115 (2019) | Western Farmers Electric Cooperative | Sub-bituminous coal | | |
| Hunter | Utah | 39°10′25″N 111°01′44″W | 1,577 | | 8,682 (2019) | | | MidAmerica Energy Company, PacifiCorp | Refined coal | 2032 | |
| Huntington | Utah | 39°22′45″N 111°04′41″W | 1,037 | | 4,898 (2019) | | | PacifiCorp | Bituminous coal | 2032 | |
| Iatan | Missouri | 39°27′09″N 94°58′35″W | 1,550 | 58% | 8,562 (2019) | 7,897,401 (2019) | 922 (2019) | Evergy | Sub-bituminous coal (Units 1-2) | 2039 (Unit 1 to be retired) No plans to retire Unit 2 as of March 2026 | |
| Independence | Arkansas | 35°40′38″N 91°24′35″W | 1,678 | 66% | 5,656 (2019) | 5,798,881 (2019) | 1,025 (2019) | Entergy | Sub-bituminous coal (Units 1-2) | 2030 (Units 1-2 to be retired and replaced with a natural gas plant) | |
| James E. Rogers | North Carolina | 35°13′02″N 81°45′40″W | 1,530 | | 6,368 (2019) | 5,201,707 (2019) | 817 (2019) | Duke Energy | Bituminous coal, natural gas | December 2026 (unit 5) | |
| James H. Miller Jr. | Alabama | 33°37′55″N 87°03′38″W | 2,640 | 79% | 18,491 (2019) | 17,826,649 (2019) | 964 (2019) | Alabama Power (majority); PowerSouth Energy Cooperative (minority) | Sub-bituminous coal (Units 1-4) | No plans to retire as of February 2026 | |
| James M. Barry | Alabama | 31°0′22″N 88°0′40″W | 2,671 | | 12,471 (2019) | 6,992,896 (2019) | 561 (2019) | Alabama Power | Natural gas, bituminous coal (Unit 5, 757MW) | December 31, 2028 (Unit 5 to be retired) | |
| Jeffrey | Kansas | 39°17′10″N 96°7′1″W | 2,160 | 50% | 6,574 (2019) | 7,583,549 (2019) | 1,154 (2019) | Evergy (50%), Black Hills Corporation (50%) | Sub-bituminous coal (Units 1-3) | 2030 (Unit 3 to be retired, Unit 2 to be converted to natural gas); 2039 (Unit 1 to be retired) | |
| J. H. Campbell | Michigan | 42°54′43.5″N 86°12′08.3″W | 1,420 | | 8,402 (2019) | 7,917,510 (2018) | 942 (2019) | CMS Energy | Sub-bituminous coal | November 2025 (All units to be retired) (Note: Scheduled August 2025 shutdown has been ordered postponed by Trump administration Energy Secretary Chris Wright. The plant maintains that they still intend to retire once federal orders to continue operations cease.) | |
| Jim Bridger | Wyoming | 41°44′15″N 108°47′14″W | 2,110 | 59% | 11,255 (2019) | | | MidAmerican Energy | Sub-bituminous coal | 2028 (unit 2), 2037 (units 3–4) | |
| J K Spruce | Texas | 29°18′26″N 98°19′13″W | 1,444 | | 6,692 (2019) | 6,470,826 (2019) | 967 (2019) | CPS Energy | Sub-bituminous coal | 2030 | |
| John B. Rich Memorial | Pennsylvania | 40°47′26″N 76°11′53″W | 88.4 | | 624 (2019) | 795,758 (2019) | | Gilberton Power | Waste coal | 2028 | |
| John E. Amos | West Virginia | 38°28′29″N 81°49′16″W | 2,933 | 50% | 9,796 (2019) | 12,145,020 (2018) | | American Electric Power | Bituminous coal | | |
| John P. Madgett | Wisconsin | 44°18′11″N 91°54′45″W | 369 | | 1,535 (2019) | 2,080,026 (2018) | | Dairyland Power Cooperative | Sub-bituminous coal | | |
| John Twitty | Missouri | 37°09′06″N 93°23′18″W | 494 | | 1,785 (2019) | 1,927,948 (2017) | | City of Springfield | Sub-bituminous coal (Units ST1-ST2, 494MW), natural gas (Units GT1-GT2, 109MW) | 2038 (Units ST1-ST2 reach end of life) | |
| John W. Turk Jr. | Arkansas | 33°39′02″N 93°48′42″W | 600 | | 4,015 (2019) | 3,690,501 (2018) | | American Electric Power (73%), Arkansas Electric Cooperative Corporation (12%), East Texas Electric Cooperative (8%), Oklahoma Municipal Power Authority (7%) | Sub-bituminous coal (Unit 1) | No plans to retire as of February 2026 | |
| J Robert Welsh | Texas | 33°03′18″N 94°50′22″W | 1,056 | | 4,545 (2019) | 5,889,068 (2018) | | Southwestern Electric Power Company | Sub-bituminous coal | January 2028 | |
| Keystone | Pennsylvania | 40°39′35″N 79°20′28″W | 1,711 | 83% | 11,005 (2019) | 11,190,515 (2018) | | Public Service Enterprise Group (22.84%), ArcLight (20.91%), others (56.25%) | Refined coal | December 31, 2028 | |
| Kincaid | Illinois | 39°35′N 89°29′W | 1,320 | | 3,115 (2019) | 5,042,995 (2018) | | Dynegy | Sub-bituminous coal (Units 1-2) | December 2027 (Units 1-2 to be retired) | |
| Kingston | Tennessee | 35°53′54″N 84°31′08″W | 1,398 | | 3,320 (2019) | 3,313,787 (2018) | | Tennessee Valley Authority | Bituminous coal, sub-bituminous coal | December 2026 (units 7–9), December 2027 (units 1–6) | |
| Kyger Creek | Ohio | 38°54′55″N 82°07′42″W | 1,086 | | 5,515 (2019) | 5,809,638 (2018) | | Ohio Valley Electric Corporation | Bituminous coal | | |
| Labadie | Missouri | 38°33′44″N 90°50′16″W | 2,372 | 76% | 15,766 (2018) | 15,758,937 (2018) | 999.55 | Ameren | Sub-bituminous coal (Units 1-4), refined coal (Units 1-4) | 2036 (Two units, unspecified), 2042 (Remaining two units, unspecified) | |
| La Cygne | Kansas | 38°20′53″N 94°38′41″W | 1,422 | | 5,798 (2019) | 5,647,055 (2018) | | Kansas City Power and Light Company, Westar Energy | Sub-bituminous coal (Units 1-2) | 2032 (Unit 1 to be retired); 2039 (Unit 2 to be retired) | |
| Laramie River Station | Wyoming | 42°6′26″N 104°53′14″W | 1,710 | 72% (2018) | 9,032 (2019) | 10,559,027 (2018) | | Basin Electric Power Cooperative | Refined coal | | |
| Lawrence | Kansas | 39°00′28″N 95°16′07″W | 517 | | 2,422 (2019) | 3,062,018 (2018) | | Evergy | Sub-bituminous coal (Units 4-5) | 2032 (Units 4-5 to be retired) | |
| Leland Olds | North Dakota | 47°16′54″N 101°19′10″W | 669 | | 3,605 (2019) | 3,863,058 (2018) | | Basin Electric Power Cooperative | Lignite, refined coal | | |
| Limestone | Texas | 31°25′24″N 96°15′5″W | 1,850 | 59% | 8,700 (2019) | 9,814,811 (2018) | | NRG Energy | Sub-bituminous coal | January 2030 | |
| Lon D. Wright | Nebraska | 41°25′41″N 96°27′44″W | 130 | | 649 (2019) | 521,858 (2019) | | City of Fremont | Sub-bituminous coal, wind | No plans to retire as of March 2026 | |
| Longview | West Virginia | 39°42′27″N 79°57′24″W | 700 | | 5,265 (2019) | 4,329,229 (2018) | | Longview Power | Bituminous coal | | |
| Louisa | Iowa | 41°19′01″N 91°05′37″W | 812 | | 3,346 (2019) | 4,816,701 (2018) | | MidAmerican Energy (88%), Interstate Power and Light (4%), Central Iowa Power Cooperative (4.6%), others (3.4%) | Refined coal (Unit 1) | No plans to retire as of February 2026 | |
| Major Oak | Texas | 31°05′29″N 96°41′34″W | 349 | | 2,414 (2019) | | | Blackstone Group | Lignite | | |
| Marion | Illinois | 37°37′14″N 88°57′18″W | 272 | | 1,652 (2019) | 1,828,122 (2018) | | Southern Illinois Power Cooperative | Bituminous coal (Units 1-3), natural gas | No plans to retire as of February 2026 | |
| Marshall | North Carolina | 35°35′51″N 80°57′53″W | 1,996 | 49% | 7,787 (2019) | 7,535,293 (2018) | | Duke Energy | Bituminous coal | December 2034 (unit 1–2) | |
| Martin Lake | Texas | 32°15′42″N 94°33′53″W | 2,250 | 71% | 12,105 (2019) | | | Luminant | Lignite, sub-bituminous coal | | |
| Mayo | North Carolina | 36°31′40″N 78°53′09″W | 727 | | 1,526 (2019) | 1,721,693 (2018) | | Duke Energy | Bituminous coal | December 2035 | |
| Merom | Indiana | 39°04′04″N 87°30′41″W | 1,080 | | 4,591 (2019) | 5,716,946 (2018) | | Hoosier Energy | Bituminous coal (Units 1-2) | No plans to retire as of February 2026 | |
| Miami Fort | Ohio | 39°06′56″N 84°48′18″W | 1,115 | | 6,974 (2019) | 5,321,490 (2018) | | Dynegy | Bituminous coal | December 2027 | |
| Michigan City | Indiana | 41°43′16″N 86°54′35″W | 680 | | 1,073 (2019) | 2,146,752 (2018) | | NiSource | Bituminous coal (Unit 12) | May 2028 (Unit 12 to be retired) | |
| Mill Creek | Kentucky | 38°03′N 85°55′W | 1,717 | | 8,258 (2019) | 8,534,037 (2018) | | Louisville Gas & Electric | Refined coal (Units 2-4) | June 2027 (Unit 2 to be retired) | |
| Milton R. Young | North Dakota | 47°03′58″N 101°12′50″W | 705 | | 4,705 (2019) | 5,284,291 (2018) | | Minnkota Power Cooperative | Refined coal | | |
| Mitchell | West Virginia | 39°49′47.99″N 80°49′4.79″W | 1633 | | 5,041 (2019) | 5,538,641 (2018) | | Appalachian Power Company (50%), Kentucky Power (50%) | Bituminous coal | | |
| Monroe | Michigan | 41°53′21″N 83°20′44″W | 3,400 | 55% | 15,322 (2019) | 15,769,057 (2018) | | DTE Energy | Refined coal (Units 1-4) | 2028 (Units 3-4 to be retired) 2032 (Units 1-2 to be retired) | |
| Mountaineer | West Virginia | 38°58′42″N 81°56′08″W | 1,300 | | 8,255 (2019) | 5,401,403 (2018) | | American Electric Power | Bituminous coal | | |
| Mount Storm | West Virginia | 39°12′03″N 79°15′46″W | 1,602 | | 4,533 (2019) | 5,348,160 (2018) | | Dominion Energy | Bituminous coal | | |
| Mt. Carmel Cogen | Pennsylvania | 40°48′40″N 76°27′14″W | 47.3 | | 81 (2019) | 134,609 (2019) | | Mount Carmel Cogen | Waste coal | 2028 | |
| Muscatine | Iowa | 41°23′21″N 91°03′31″W | 293.5 | | 695 (2019) | 1,114,601 (2018) | | Board of Water Electric and Communications | Refined coal (Units 7-9) | December 31, 2028 (Units 7-8) | |
| Muskogee | Oklahoma | 35°45′42″N 95°17′15″W | 1,716 | | 1,551 (2019) | 4,259,912 (2018) | | Oklahoma Gas and Electric Company | Natural gas (1,144MW), sub-bituminous coal (573 MW) | | |
| Muskogee Mill | Oklahoma | 35°43′57″N 95°17′38″W | 114 | | 373 (2019) | 560,787 (2019) | | Koch Industries | Sub-bituminous coal (89 MW), natural gas (25 MW) | | |
| Nearman Creek | Kansas | 39°10′14″N 94°41′51″W | 235 | | 1,068 (2019) | 1,039,764 (2018) | | City of Kansas City | Sub-bituminous coal (Unit 1), natural gas | No plans to retire as of March 2026 | |
| Nebraska City | Nebraska | 40°37′26″N 95°46′38″W | 1,212 | | 6,812 (2019) | 8,833,311 (2018) | | Omaha Public Power District | Sub-bituminous coal | No plans to retire as of March 2026 | |
| New Madrid | Missouri | 36°30′58″N 89°33′50″W | 1,200 | | 6,881 (2019) | 7,179,989 (2018) | | Associated Electric Cooperative | Refined coal | No plans to retire as of March 2026 | |
| Newton | Illinois | 38°56′10″N 88°16′40″W | 617 | | 3,201 (2019) | | | Vistra Energy | Refined coal (Unit 1) | December 2027 | |
| Northampton | Pennsylvania | 40°41′28″N 75°28′45″W | 134 | | 154 (2019) | | | Olympus Power | Waste coal | 2028 | |
| Northeastern | Oklahoma | 36°25′35″N 95°42′03″W | 946 | | 4,639 (2019) | 3,709,621 (2018) | | Public Service Company of Oklahoma | Natural gas (50%), sub-bituminous coal (50%) | 2026 (unit 3; 469 MW) | |
| North Omaha | Nebraska | 41°19′43″N 95°56′57″W | 627 | | 1,873 (2019) | 1,823,417 (2018) | | Omaha Public Power District | Sub-bituminous coal (Units 4-5), natural gas (Units 1-3) | 2028 (Units 4-5 to be converted to natural gas) (Note: Conversion to natural gas has begun construction, but the Omaha Public Power District's board of directors voted in 2025 to delay the conversion of the plant. 2028 is currently a tentative date.) | |
| Northside | Florida | 30°25′43″N 81°33′10″W | 1,300 | | 3,878 (2019) | 3,551,547 (2018) | | JEA | Natural gas, petroleum coke, bituminous coal (Units 1-2, 600MW) | No plans to retire as of February 2026 | |
| Oak Creek, (Elm Road) | Wisconsin | 42°50′40″N 87°49′43″W | 1,135 | | 7,748 (2020) | | | WE Energies | Refined coal, bituminous coal | May 2024 (units 5 and 6), 2025 (units 7 and 8) | |
| Oak Grove | Texas | 31°10′53″N 96°29′17″W | 1,796 | 78% | 12,407 (2019) | 11,676,507 (2018) | | Luminant | Refined coal | | |
| Ottumwa | Iowa | 41°05′49″N 92°33′19″W | 726 | | 3,791 (2019) | 3,724,042 (2018) | | MidAmerican Energy (52%), Interstate Power and Light (48%) | Sub-bituminous coal (Unit 1) | No plans to retire as of February 2026 | |
| Panther Creek | Pennsylvania | 40°51′17″N 75°52′42″W | 94 | | 105 (2019) | 137,092 (2019) | | Panther Creek Power Operating LLC | Waste coal | 2028 | |
| Platte | Nebraska | 40°51′17″N 98°20′53″W | 100 | | 505 (2019) | 591,747 (2019) | | City of Grand Island | Sub-bituminous coal | No plans to retire as of March 2026 | |
| Pleasants Power Station | West Virginia | 39°22′01″N 81°17′41″W | 1300 | | | | | Energy Harbor | Refined coal | | |
| Plum Point | Arkansas | 35°39′47″N 89°56′48″W | 680 | | 3,945 (2019) | 4,791,733 (2018) | | NRG Energy | Sub-bituminous coal (Unit 1) | No plans to retire as of February 2026 | |
| Powerton | Illinois | 40°32′28″N 89°40′48″W | 1,536 | 34% | 2,335 (2019) | 5,169,444 (2018) | | NRG Energy | Sub-bituminous coal (Units 5-6) | December 31, 2028 (Units 5-6 to be retired) | |
| Prairie State | Illinois | 38°16′40″N 89°40′4″W | 1,600 | 82% | 12,053 (2019) | 10,109,017 (2018) | | Prairie State Energy Campus | Bituminous coal (Units 1-2) | No plans to retire as of February 2026 | |
| Purdue University | Indiana | 40°25′02.0″N 86°54′43.9″W | 43.2 | | 158 (2019) | 274,173 (2019) | | Purdue University | Natural gas (Units 1-2, 91.5%), bituminous coal (Units 1-2, 8.5%) | No plans to retire as of February 2026 | |
| Rawhide | Colorado | 40°51′36″N 105°01′29″W | 280 | | 2,038 (2019) | 1,812,653 (2018) | | Platte River Power Authority | Sub-bituminous coal (Unit 1), natural gas | December 31, 2029 (Unit 1 to be retired) | |
| Ray Nixon | Colorado | 38°38′00″N 104°42′24″W | 207 | | 1,245 (2019) | 1,152,894 (2018) | | City of Colorado Springs | Sub-bituminous coal (Unit 1) | December 31, 2029 (Unit 1 to be retired) (Note: Colorado Springs Utilities has stated that they wish to delay the retirement of the plant) | |
| Red Hills | Mississippi | 33°22′17″N 89°13′02″W | 514 | | 2,367 (2019) | 2,977,203 (2018) | | NAES | Refined coal, lignite | No plans to retire as of March 2026 | |
| River Valley | Oklahoma | 35°11′38″N 94°38′44″W | 350 | | 539 (2019) | 2,077,873 (2018) | | Oklahoma Gas and Electric Company | Sub-bituminous coal, bituminous coal | | |
| R.M. Schahfer | Indiana | 41°13′1″N 87°1′16″W | 1,040 | | 5,493 (2019) | 7,296,996 (2018) | | NiSource | Bituminous coal (Units 17-18) | December 31, 2025 (Units 17-18 to be retired) (Note: The U.S. Department of Energy issued an emergency order in December 2025 to keep this unit open unit March 2026.) | |
| Rockport | Indiana | 37°55′32″N 87°02′02″W | 2,600 | | 8,147 (2019) | 11,629,822 (2018) | | Indiana-Michigan Power | Sub-bituminous coal (Units 1-2), bituminous coal (Units 1-2) | December 2028 | |
| Rosebud (Colstrip Energy LP) | Montana | 45°58′31″N 106°39′19.8″W | 38 | | 301 (2019) | 391,154 (2019) | 1,300 (2019) | Rosebud Energy Corporation (50%), ACI Energy (25%), Harrier Power Corporation (25%) | Waste coal | No plans to retire as of March 2026 | |
| Roxboro | North Carolina | 36°28′44″N 79°04′15″W | 2,422 | 28% | 6,947 (2019) | 5,719,006 (2018) | | Duke Energy | Bituminous coal | 2033 | |
| Roy S. Nelson | Louisiana | 30°17′00″N 93°17′19″W | 614.6 | | 3,221 (2019) | 5,052,953 (2018) | | Entergy | Sub-bituminous coal (Unit 6, 614.6 MW), natural gas (Unit 4, 591.8 MW) petroleum coke (Unit 1-2, 227.2 MW) | 2030 (Unit 6 to be retired) | |
| Sandy Creek | Texas | 31°28′30″N 96°57′26″W | 1,008 | | 5,027 (2019) | 5,868,439 (2018) | | Sandy Creek Energy Associates | Sub-bituminous coal | | |
| San Miguel | Texas | 28°42′16″N 98°28′37″W | 410 | | 2,077 (2019) | 3,028,257 (2018) | | San Miguel Electric Cooperative | Lignite | | |
| Scherer | Georgia | 33°03′45″N 83°48′14″W | 3,520 | 50% | 7,031 (2022) | 8,933,998 (2021) | | Oglethorpe Power (30%), Georgia Power (22.95%), others (47.05%) | Sub-bituminous coal (Units 1-3) | December 31, 2038 (Units 1-3, legal deadline) | |
| Scrubgrass | Pennsylvania | 41°16′07″N 79°48′49″W | 94.7 | | 241 | 343,007 | | Scrubgrass Generating Company | Waste coal | 2028 | |
| Seminole | Florida | 29°44′16″N 81°38′05″W | 735.9 | | 7,054 (2019) | 7,200,873 (2018) | | Seminole Electric Cooperative | Bituminous coal (Unit 2), natural gas | No plans to retire as of February 2026 | |
| Seward | Pennsylvania | 40°24′22″N 79°02′01″W | 585 | | 1,867 (2019) | 1,928,181 (2019) | | Seward Generating | Waste coal | 2028 | |
| Shawnee | Kentucky | 37°09′N 88°46′W | 1,750 | | 5,676 (2019) | 6,853,097 (2018) | | Tennessee Valley Authority | Sub-bituminous coal (Units 1-9) | December 2033 (Units 1-2, 4-9) | |
| Sheldon | Nebraska | 40°33′33″N 96°47′05″W | 225 | | 739 (2019) | 1,026,151 (2018) | | Nebraska Public Power District | Sub-bituminous coal | No plans to retire as of March 2026 | |
| Sherburne County | Minnesota | 45°22′43″N 93°53′48″W | 2,238 | 64% | 10,753 (2019) | 12,617,304 (2018) | | Northern States Power Company | Sub-bituminous coal (Units 1, 3) | December 2026 (Unit 1 to be retired), December 2034 (Unit 3 to be retired) | |
| Sikeston | Missouri | 36°52′45″N 89°37′15″W | 261 | | 1,619 (2019) | 1,835,335 (2018) | | City of Sikeston | Sub-bituminous coal | No plans to retire as of March 2026 | |
| Silver Bay | Minnesota | 47°17′12″N 91°15′38″W | 132 | | 182 (2019) | 489,746 (2018) | | Cleveland-Cliffs Inc. | Sub-bituminous coal | No plans to retire as of March 2026 | |
| Sioux | Missouri | 38°54′54″N 90°17′22″W | 974 | | 3,886 (2019) | 5,874,772 (2018) | | Union Electric Company | Refined coal | December 2028 | |
| Sooner | Oklahoma | 36°27′14″N 97°03′10″W | 1,138 | | 3,610 (2019) | 4,674,868 (2018) | | Oklahoma Gas and Electric Company | Sub-bituminous coal | | |
| Southern Illinois University Carbondale | Illinois | 37°42′42.3″N 89°12′55.3″W | 5.1 | | 8 (2019) | 88,579 (2019) | | Southern Illinois University | Bituminous coal (Unit 5) | No plans to retire as of February 2026 | |
| Spiritwood | North Dakota | 46°55′32.1″N 98°30′02.2″W | 99 | | 181 (2019) | 462,292 (2018) | | Great River Energy | Natural gas, lignite, refined coal | | |
| Springerville | Arizona | 34°19′4″N 109°9′55″W | 1,638 | 73% | 7,945 (2019) | 8,159,371 (2019) | | Salt River Project | Sub-bituminous coal (Units 1-4,1625 MW), solar (13.4 MW) | 2029 (Unit 4 to be converted to natural gas); 2030 (Units 1-2 to be converted to natural gas); September 15, 2031 (Unit 3 to be retired) | |
| St. Nicholas Cogen | Pennsylvania | 40°49′21″N 76°10′24″W | 99.2 | | 600 (2019) | | | Schuylkill Energy Resource Inc | Waste coal | 2028 | |
| Sunnyside Cogen | Utah | 39°32′46″N 110°23′28″W | 58.1 | | 401 (2019) | 455,275 (2019) | | Sunnyside Cogen Associates | Waste coal | | |
| Tennessee Eastman Operations | Tennessee | 36°31′19″N 82°32′35″W | 195 | | 1,155 (2019) | 2,867,087 (2018) | | Eastman Chemical Company | Bituminous coal, natural gas | | |
| TES Filer City | Michigan | 44°13′02″N 86°17′24″W | 73 | | 453 (2019) | 563,562 (2018) | | TES Filer city | Bituminous coal, natural gas, biomass | No plans to retire as of March 2026 | |
| Thomas Hill | Missouri | 39°33′02″N 92°38′15″W | 1,135 | | 8,112 (2019) | 7,212,753 (2018) | | Associated Electric Cooperative | Refined coal | No plans to retire as of March 2026 | |
| Tolk | Texas | 34°11′00″N 102°34′10″W | 1,067 | | 2,742 (2019) | 3,844,953 (2018) | | Xcel Energy | Sub-bituminous coal | December 2037 | |
| Trimble County | Kentucky | 38°35′05″N 85°24′43″W | 2,234 | | 8,823 (2019) | 8,015,909 (2018) | | Louisville Gas & Electric | Refined coal (Units 1-2, 1,274 MW), natural gas (Units 5-10, 960 MW) | No plans to retire as of March 2026 | |
| University of Alaska Fairbanks (Note: Newest coal-fired power plant in the United States. It was finished in 2018 and is the only coal-fired power plant constructed in the US since 2015.) | Alaska | 64°51′14″N 147°49′20″W | 17 | | 28 (2019) | 111,806 (2018) | | University of Alaska | Sub-bituminous coal | No plans to retire as of February 2026 | |
| University of Illinois Abbott | Illinois | 40°06′17″N 88°14′32″W | 47 | | 167 (2019) | 164,582 (2019) | | University of Illinois | Natural gas, bituminous coal | No plans to retire as of February 2026 | |
| University of North Carolina Chapel Hill Cogen | North Carolina | 35°54′23″N 79°03′44″W | 32 | | 51 (2019) | 199,567 (2018) | | University of North Carolina | Bituminous coal, natural gas | | |
| Victor J. Daniel | Mississippi | 30°31′48″N 88°33′22″W | 2,084 | | 10,355 (2019) | 5,703,976 (2018) | | Mississippi Power (50%), Gulf Power (50%) | Natural gas (1081 MW), sub-bituminous and bituminous coal (Units 1-2, 1004 MW) | May 2027 (Units 1-2 to be retired) (Note: Retirement of coal units may be delayed through 2028.) | |
| Virginia City | Virginia | 36°54′55″N 82°20′23″W | 600 | | 1,185 (2019) | 2,571,065 (2018) | | Virginia Electric and Power Company | Bituminous coal, wood | 2045 | |
| Walter Scott Jr. | Iowa | 41°11′08″N 95°50′32″W | 1,648 | | 8,014 (2019) | 9,214,542 (2018) | | MidAmerican Energy (majority), Central Iowa Power Cooperative, Lincoln Electric Systems, 12 others | Refined coal (Units 3-4) | No plans to retire as of February 2026 | |
| W. A. Parish | Texas | 29°28′34″N 95°38′0″W | 3,653 | | 14,328 (2019) | | | NRG Energy | Sub-bituminous coal, natural gas | December 2044 (coal) | |
| Warrick | Indiana | 37°54′53″N 87°20′01″W | 755 | | 4,215 (2019) | | | Alcoa | Bituminous coal | No plans to retire as of February 2026 | |
| Wateree | South Carolina | 33°49′35″N 80°37′19″W | 772 | | 2,061 (2019) | 3,633,686 (2018) | | Dominion Energy | Bituminous coal | 2028 | |
| Weston | Wisconsin | 44°51′31″N 89°38′59″W | 1,076 | | 4,409 (2019) | 4,114,169 (2018) | | WEC Energy Group, Wisconsin Public Service Corporation | Refined coal | 2031 (Unit 3) | |
| Westwood | Pennsylvania | 40°37′08″N 76°27′04″W | 36 | | 127 (2019) | 207,832 (2019) | | Rausch Creek Generation LLC | Waste coal | 2028 | |
| Whelan | Nebraska | 40°34′50″N 98°18′39″W | 324 | | 1,418 (2019) | 2,272,356 (2018) | | City of Hastings | Sub-bituminous coal, refined coal | No plans to retire as of March 2026 | |
| White Bluff | Arkansas | 34°25′25″N 92°08′26″W | 1,659 | | 8,252 (2018) | 8,273,947 (2018) | | Entergy | Sub-bituminous coal (Units 1-2) | 2028 (Units 1-2 to be retired and replaced with a natural gas plant) | |
| Whitewater Valley | Indiana | 39°48′07″N 84°53′43″W | 100 | | 39 (2019) | 49,447 (2019) | | Indiana Municipal Power Agency | Bituminous coal | No plans to retire as of February 2026 | |
| Williams Station | South Carolina | 33°00′59″N 79°55′44″W | 633 | | 2,557 (2019) | 2,759,206 (2018) | | Dominion Energy | Refined coal, bituminous coal | 2028 | |
| Winyah | South Carolina | 33°19′51″N 79°21′28″W | 1,260 | | 1,583 (2019) | 1,582,699 (2018) | | Santee Cooper | Refined coal | December 2028 | |
| Wygen | Wyoming | 44°17′09″N 105°23′00″W | 176 | | 703 (2019) | | | Black Hills Power | Sub-bituminous coal | | |
| Wyodak | Wyoming | 44°17′20″N 105°23′06″W | 402 | | 1,851 (2019) | | | PacifiCorp (80%), South Dakota Electric (20%) | Sub-bituminous coal | 2039 | |

**The fuel type that is at the top of the section of each power plant is the most used fuel, and the one at the bottom is the least used. For example, Williams Station uses more refined coal than bituminous coal.**

**Refined coal is lower grade sub-bituminous or lignite coal that is treated to create less toxins when burned and is supported by government subsidies.**

**Muskogee Mill and Muskogee power plants are different, despite being in the same state, and are not duplicates.**

== See also ==
- List of decommissioned coal-fired power stations in the United States
- List of power stations in the United States
- List of largest power stations in the United States
- List of natural gas-fired power stations in the United States
