= List of largest power stations in the United States =

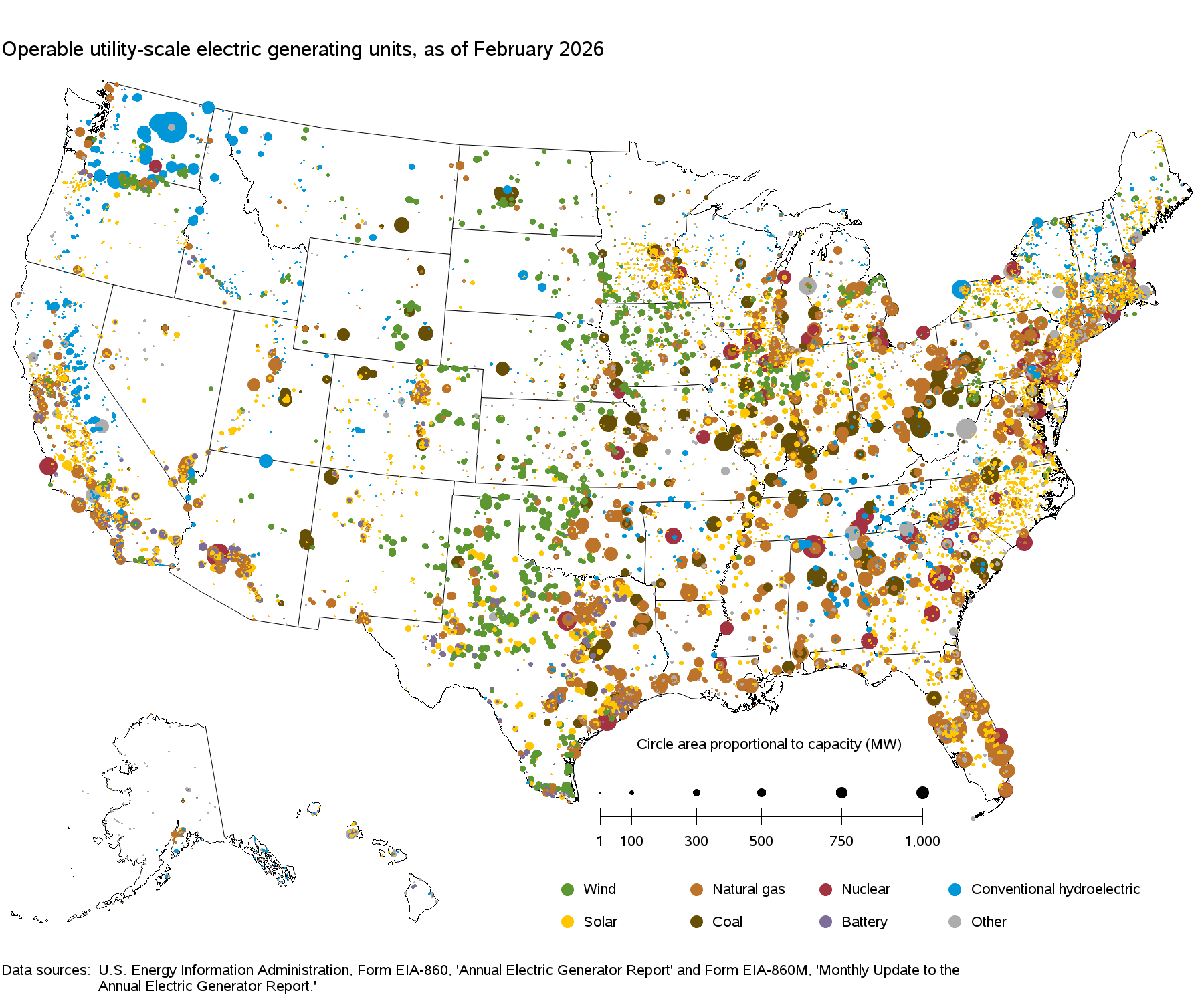
Map of all utility-scale power plants

This article lists the largest electricity generating stations in the United States in terms of installed electrical capacity. Non-renewable power stations are those that run on coal, fuel oils, nuclear, natural gas, oil shale, and peat, while renewable power stations run on fuel sources such as biomass, geothermal heat, hydro, solar energy, solar heat, tides, waves, and the wind.

Two related terms are used to describe electricity production:

- Generation—a measure of electricity produced over time. Most electric power plants use some of the electricity they produce to operate the power plant. Net generation excludes the electricity used for the operation of the power plant.
- Capacity—the maximum level of electric power (electricity) that a power plant can supply at a specific point in time under certain conditions.

The power generating facility with the largest power capacity (potential power production) is the Grand Coulee Dam in Washington. The facility generates power by utilizing 27 Francis turbines and 6 pump-generators, with a total installed capacity of 7,079 MW. However, Grand Coulee Dam does not have the largest annual net generation due to a relatively low capacity factor.

The power generating facility with the largest annual net generation (actual electricity put out to the power grid) is Palo Verde in Arizona with 31,629,862 MWh in 2021. The second and third largest were Browns Ferry and Peach Bottom with 31,053,552 MWh and 22,268,244 MWh, respectively. All three of these are nuclear power plants, and eight of the top 10 power plants with the largest annual net generation in 2021 are nuclear power plants.

The largest power generating facility under construction is the Chokecherry and Sierra Madre Wind Energy Project in Wyoming, which will generate 2,500-3,000 MW when completed in 2029.

== Largest power stations ==
List of the electrical generating facilities in the United States with an installed capacity of at least 1,500 MW.

Rank	Name	Image	State	Location	Capacity (MW)	Annual generation (GWh)	Capacity factor	Type	Owner	Ref
1	Grand Coulee		Washington	47°57′21″N 118°58′54″W	6,809	21,043 (2018)	35.28%	Hydro	U.S. Bureau of Reclamation	
2	Alvin W. Vogtle		Georgia	33°8′36″N 81°45′38″W	4,536	33,871 (2024)	98.98%	Nuclear (PWR)	Georgia Power (45%); Oglethorpe Power (30%); Others (25%)	
3	Palo Verde		Arizona	33°23′21″N 112°51′54″W	3,942	31,097 (2018)	90.05%	Nuclear (PWR)	Arizona Public Service (29.1%); Salt River Project (17.5%); Others (53.4%)	
4	Browns Ferry		Alabama	34°42′14″N 87°7′7″W	3,775	25,398 (2018)	87.94%	Nuclear (BWR)	Tennessee Valley Authority	
5	West County		Florida	26°42′0″N 80°22′30″W	3,750	19,841 (2018)	60.40%	Natural gas	FPL	
6	W. A. Parish		Texas	29°28′34″N 95°38′0″W	3,653	15,851 (2018)	49.53%	Coal (73.8%); Natural gas (26.2%)	NRG Energy	
7	SunZia		New Mexico	34°15′02″N 105°35′44″W	3,650			Wind	Pattern Energy	
8	Robert W. Scherer		Georgia	33°03′45″N 83°48′14″W	3,520	15,420 (2018)	50.01%	Coal	Oglethorpe Power (30%); Georgia Power (22.95%); Others (47.05%)	
9	Bowen		Georgia	34°07′23″N 84°55′13″W	3,499	13,620 (2018)	44.44%	Coal	Georgia Power	
10	Monroe		Michigan	41°53′21″N 83°20′44″W	3,400	16,375 (2025)	54.98%	Coal	DTE Electric	
11	Gibson		Indiana	38°22′19″N 87°46′02″W	3,132	17,632 (2018)	60.17%	Coal	Duke Energy (90.3%); IMPA (4.87%); WVPA (4.87%)	
12	Bath County		Virginia	38°13′50″N 79°49′10″W	3,003	-983 (2018)	-3.74%	Hydro (pumped-storage)	Dominion Energy (60%); Bath County Energy (24%); Allegheny Energy (16%)	
13	Turkey Point		Florida	25°26′3″N 80°19′50″W	2,979	19,812 (2018)	75.92%	Nuclear (PWR) (59%); Natural gas or fuel oil (41%)	FPL	
14	Manatee		Florida	27°36′19″N 82°20′47″W	2,951	8,383 (2016)	32.43%	Natural gas	FPL	
15	John E. Amos		West Virginia	38°28′29″N 81°49′16″W	2,933	12,985 (2018)	50.54%	Coal	American Electric Power	
16	South Texas Project		Texas	28°47′44″N 96°2′56″W	2,760	20,688 (2018)	85.57%	Nuclear (PWR)	NRG Energy (44%); City of San Antonio (40%); City of Austin (16%)	
17	Fort Myers		Florida	26°41′48″N 81°46′57″W	2,681	9,287 (2018)	39.54%	Natural gas (98%); Fuel oil (2%)	FPL	
18	Robert Moses Niagara		New York	43°08′35″N 79°02′23″W	2,675	16,773 (2018)	71.58%	Hydro (reservoir)	New York Power Authority	
19	James H. Miller Jr.		Alabama	33°37′55″N 87°03′38″W	2,640	18,325 (2018)	79.24%	Coal	Alabama Power	
20	Peach Bottom		Pennsylvania	39°45′30″N 76°16′5″W	2,617	21,680 (2018)	94.57%	Nuclear (BWR)	Exelon (75%); PSEG (25%)	
21	General James M. Gavin		Ohio	38°56′09″N 82°07′00″W	2,600	16,006 (2018)	70.28%	Coal	Lightstone Generation	
22	Rockport (Note: Both units will be decommissioned by December 2028.)		Indiana	37°55′32″N 87°02′02″W	2,600	11,894 (2018)	52.22%	Coal	American Electric Power	
23	Oconee		South Carolina	34°47′38″N 82°53′53″W	2,554	21,294 (2018)	95.18%	Nuclear (PWR)	Duke Energy	
24	Susquehanna		Pennsylvania	41°5′20″N 76°8′56″W	2,514	20,469 (2018)	92.95%	Nuclear (BWR)	Talen Energy (90%); AEC (10%)	
25	Braidwood		Illinois	41°14′37″N 88°13′45″W	2,500	19,343 (2018)	88.32%	Nuclear (PWR)	Exelon	
26	Ravenswood		New York	40°45′35″N 73°56′45″W	2,480	3,338 (2018)	15.36%	Fuel oil or natural gas	IHI Power Services	
27	Cumberland		Tennessee	36°23′29″N 87°39′17″W	2,470	10,441 (2018)	48.25%	Coal	Tennessee Valley Authority	
28	Byron		Illinois	42°4′27″N 89°16′55″W	2,452	20,118 (2019)	93.35%	Nuclear (PWR)	Exelon	
29	Sequoyah		Tennessee	35°13′35″N 85°5′30″W	2,440	17,704 (2018)	82.83%	Nuclear (PWR)	Tennessee Valley Authority	
30	Union		Arkansas	33°17′52″N 92°35′18″W	2,428	10,305 (2018)	59.41%	Natural gas	Entergy	
31	Comanche Peak		Texas	32°17′54″N 97°47′6″W	2,425	20,498 (2018)	96.49%	Nuclear (PWR)	Luminant	
32	Roxboro		North Carolina	36°28′44″N 79°04′15″W	2,422	5,928 (2018)	27.94%	Coal	Duke Energy	
33	Chalk Point		Maryland	38°32′37″N 76°41′19″W	2,413 (Note: Units 1-2 were decommissioned in 2021, lowering the station's installed capacity to 1,318 MW.)	1,455 (2018)	6.88%	Fuel oil or natural gas (69.8%); Coal (30.2%)	NRG Energy	
34	Cross		South Carolina	33°22′9″N 80°6′51″W	2,390	9,545 (2018)	45.59%	Coal	Santee Cooper	
35	Sanford		Florida	28°50′34″N 81°19′34″W	2,378	9,968 (2018)	47.85%	Natural gas	FPL	
36	Labadie		Missouri	38°33′44″N 90°50′16″W	2,372	15,766 (2018)	75.88%	Coal	Ameren	
37	Catawba		South Carolina	35°3′N 81°4′W	2,370	18,780 (2018)	90.46%	Nuclear (PWR)	Duke Energy	
38	Watts Bar		Tennessee	35°36′10″N 84°47′22″W	2,332	18,473 (2018)	90.43%	Nuclear (PWR)	Tennessee Valley Authority	
39	Salem		New Jersey	39°27′46″N 75°32′8″W	2,327	18,895 (2018)	92.69%	Nuclear (PWR)	PSEG (57%); Exelon (43%)	
40	McGuire		North Carolina	35°25′57″N 80°56′54″W	2,316	19,862 (2018)	97.90%	Nuclear (PWR)	Duke Energy	
41	LaSalle County		Illinois	41°14′44″N 88°40′9″W	2,277	19,346 (2018)	96.99%	Nuclear (BWR)	Exelon	
42	Limerick		Pennsylvania	40°13′36″N 75°35′14″W	2,268	19,339 (2018)	97.34%	Nuclear (BWR)	Constellation Energy	
43	Diablo Canyon		California	35°12′39″N 120°51′22″W	2,256	18,214 (2018)	92.16%	Nuclear (PWR)	Pacific Gas and Electric	
44	Martin Lake		Texas	32°15′42″N 94°33′53″W	2,250	14,050 (2018)	71.28%	Coal	Luminant	
45	Belews Creek		North Carolina	36°16′53″N 80°3′37″W	2,240	8,021 (2018)	40.88%	Coal	Duke Energy	
46	Sherburne County		Minnesota	45°22′43″N 93°53′48″W	2,238	12,478 (2018)	63.65%	Coal	NSP	
47	Martin		Florida	27°03′11″N 80°33′00″W	2,225	12,882 (2018)	66.09%	Natural gas (96.6%); Solar (3.4%)	FPL	
48	Donald C. Cook		Michigan	41°58′32″N 86°33′55″W	2,213	17,611 (2018)	90.84%	Nuclear (PWR)	American Electric Power	
49	Gila River		Arizona	32°58′36″N 112°41′39″W	2,200	6,192 (2018)	32.13%	Natural gas	Salt River Project (75%); Tucson Electric Power (25%)	
50	Ludington		Michigan	43°53′37″N 86°26′43″W	2,172	-698 (2018)	-3.67%	Hydro (pumped-storage)	Consumers Energy (51%); DTE Electric (49%)	
51	Jeffrey		Kansas	39°17′10″N 96°7′1″W	2,160	9,499 (2018)	50.20%	Coal	Evergy (50%); Black Hills Corporation (50%)	
52	John Day		Oregon; Washington	45°42′59″N 120°41′40″W	2,160	9,193 (2018)	48.58%	Hydro (run-of-the-river)	U.S. Army Corps of Engineers	
53	Petersburg		Indiana	38°31′39″N 87°15′14″W	2,146	9,101 (2018)	48.41%	Coal	AES Indiana	
54	Jim Bridger		Wyoming	41°44′15″N 108°47′14″W	2,110	10,967 (2018)	59.33%	Coal	MidAmerican Energy	
55	Millstone		Connecticut	41°18′43″N 72°10′7″W	2,098	16,881 (2018)	91.85%	Nuclear (PWR)	Dominion Energy	
56	Hoover		Arizona; Nevada	36°0′56″N 114°44′16″W	2,080	3,542 (2018)	19.44%	Hydro (reservoir)	U.S. Bureau of Reclamation	
57	Chief Joseph		Washington	47°59′43″N 119°38′00″W	2,075	12,352 (2018)	67.95%	Hydro (run-of-the-river)	U.S. Army Corps of Engineers	
58	Hines Energy Complex		Florida	27°47′22″N 81°52′17″W	2,060	13,368 (2018)	74.08%	Natural gas	Duke Energy	
59	Marshall		North Carolina	35°35′51″N 80°57′53″W	1,996	8,486 (2018)	48.53%	Coal	Duke Energy	
60	R.M. Schahfer (Note: To be decommissioned by 2025.)		Indiana	41°13′1″N 87°1′16″W	1,943	6,772 (2018)	39.79%	Coal	NiSource	
61	Ghent		Kentucky	38°45′15″N 85°1′17″W	1,919	11,265 (2018)	67.01%	Coal	Kentucky Utilities	
62	Nine Mile Point		New York	43°31′15″N 76°24′25″W	1,907	15,383 (2018)	92.08%	Nuclear (BWR)	Exelon (50%); EDF (50%)	
63	Hal B. Wansley		Georgia	33°24′22″N 85°2′17″W	1,904	2,791 (2018)	16.73%	Coal	Southern Power	
64	North Anna		Virginia	38°3′38″N 77°47′22″W	1,892	16,035 (2018)	96.75%	Nuclear (PWR)	Dominion Energy (88.4%); ODEC (11.6%)	
65	Sabine		Texas	30°01′24″N 93°52′37″W	1,890	4,192 (2018)	25.32%	Natural gas	Entergy	
66	St. Lucie		Florida	27°20′55″N 80°14′47″W	1,880	15,563 (2018)	94.50%	Nuclear (PWR)	FPL	
67	Guernsey		Ohio	39°56′15″N 81°32′6.1″W	1,875	11,100 (2024)	67.58%	Natural gas	Caithness Energy; Apex Power Group	
68	Conemaugh		Pennsylvania	40°23′05″N 79°03′49″W	1,872	11,445 (2018)	69.79%	Coal	PSEG	
69	Brunswick		North Carolina	33°57′30″N 78°0′37″W	1,858	14,627 (2018)	89.87%	Nuclear (BWR)	Duke Energy	
70	Limestone		Texas	31°25′24″N 96°15′5″W	1,850	9,548 (2018)	58.92%	Coal	NRG Energy	
71	Arkansas Nuclear One		Arkansas	35°18′37″N 93°13′53″W	1,829	12,721 (2018)	79.40%	Nuclear (PWR)	Entergy	
72	Beaver Valley		Pennsylvania	40°37′24″N 80°25′50″W	1,826	14,653 (2018)	91.61%	Nuclear (PWR)	FirstEnergy	
73	Forney		Texas	32°45′46″N 96°29′00″W	1,824	10,422 (2018)	65.23%	Natural gas	Luminant	
74	Big Bend (Note: The coal-fired Unit 1 (445 MW) is being replaced with a combined-cycle natural gas unit (1,090 MW). Unit 2 (445 MW) will be decommissioned. Units 3 and 4 (445 and 486 MW, respectively) will remain unchanged and operational. Modernization will be completed by 2023.)		Florida	27°47′45″N 82°24′13″W	1,821	4,788 (2018)	30.02%	Coal	TECO Energy	
75	Curtis H. Stanton		Florida	28°28′56″N 81°09′59″W	1,820	6,179 (2018)	38.76%	Natural gas (51.6%); Coal (48.4%)	Orlando Utilities Commission	
76	Quad Cities		Illinois	41°43′35″N 90°18′36″W	1,819	15,476 (2018)	97.12%	Nuclear (BWR)	Exelon (75%); MidAmerican Energy (25%)	
77	The Dalles		Oregon; Washington	45°36′44″N 121°08′04″W	1,813	7,161 (2018)	45.09%	Hydro (run-of-the-river)	U.S. Army Corps of Engineers	
78	Oswego Harbor		New York	43°27′31″N 76°31′55″W	1,804	42 (2018)	0.27%	Fuel oil or natural gas	NRG Energy	
79	Cardinal		Ohio	40°15′7″N 80°38′51″W	1,800	10,038 (2018)	63.66%	Coal	American Electric Power	
80	H. L. Culbreath Bayside		Florida	27°54′26″N 82°25′23″W	1,800	6,654 (2018)	42.20%	Natural gas	Tampa Electric Company	
81	Intermountain (Note: To be converted to natural gas by 2025.)		Utah	39°30′27″N 112°34′49″W	1,800	8,499 (2018)	53.90%	Coal	Intermountain Power Agency	
82	Dresden		Illinois	41°23′23″N 88°16′5″W	1,797	15,538 (2018)	98.71%	Nuclear (BWR)	Exelon	
83	Oak Grove		Texas	31°10′53″N 96°29′17″W	1,796	12,216 (2018)	77.65%	Coal	Luminant	
84	Alamitos		California	33°46′09″N 118°06′07″W	1,760	958 (2018)	6.21%	Natural gas	AES Corporation	
85	Fayette		Texas	29°55′00″N 96°45′06″W	1,760	10,360 (2018)	67.20%	Coal	Austin Energy (50%); LCRA (50%)	
86	Edwin I. Hatch		Georgia	31°56′3″N 82°20′38″W	1,759	14,404 (2018)	93.48%	Nuclear (BWR)	Georgia Power (50.1%); Oglethorpe Power (30%); Others (19.9%)	
87	Joseph M. Farley		Alabama	31°13′23″N 85°6′42″W	1,757	14,065 (2018)	91.38%	Nuclear (PWR)	Alabama Power	
88	Calvert Cliffs		Maryland	38°25′55″N 76°26′32″W	1,718	14,988 (2018)	99.59%	Nuclear (PWR)	Constellation Energy	
89	Keystone		Pennsylvania	40°39′35″N 79°20′28″W	1,711	12,418 (2018)	82.85%	Coal	PSEG (22.84%); ArcLight (20.91%); Others (56.25%)	
90	Laramie River		Wyoming	42°6′26″N 104°53′14″W	1,710	10,690 (2018)	71.36%	Coal	Basin Electric Power Cooperative	
91	Independence		Arkansas	35°40′38″N 91°24′35″W	1,678	9,683 (2018)	65.87%	Coal	Entergy	
92	Surry		Virginia	37°9′56″N 76°41′52″W	1,676	13,219 (2018)	90.04%	Nuclear (PWR)	Dominion Energy	
93	Midlothian		Texas	32°25′48″N 97°03′18″W	1,650	5,539 (2018)	38.32%	Natural gas	American National Power	
94	Midland		Michigan	43°35′10″N 84°13′19″W	1,633	7,896 (2018)	55.20%	Natural gas	MCV Limited Partnership	
95	Raccoon Mountain		Tennessee	35°2′54″N 85°23′48″W	1,616	-620 (2018)	-4.38%	Hydro (pumped-storage)	Tennessee Valley Authority	
96	Prairie State		Illinois	38°16′40″N 89°40′4″W	1,600	11,532 (2018)	82.28%	Coal	Prairie State Energy Campus	
97	The Geysers		California	38°47′26″N 122°45′21″W	1,590	6,516 (2018)	46.78%	Geothermal (dry steam)	Calpine (86.5%); NCPA (4.5%); Others (9%)	
98	Brunner Island		Pennsylvania	40°05′44″N 76°41′49″W	1,567	1,853 (2018)	13.50%	Coal	Talen Energy	
99	Springerville		Arizona	34°19′4″N 109°9′55″W	1,560	9,962 (2018)	72.90%	Coal	Salt River Project	
100	Iatan		Missouri	39°27′09″N 94°58′35″W	1,550	7,825 (2018)	57.63%	Coal	Evergy	
101	Alta		California	35°1′16″N 118°19′14″W	1,548	3,366 (2018)	24.82%	Wind	SCE	
102	Four Corners		Navajo Nation	36°41′17″N 108°28′37″W	1,540	7,509 (2018)	42.02%	Coal	Arizona Public Service (66%); SCE (19.2%); Others (14.8%)	
103	Powerton		Illinois	40°32′28″N 89°40′48″W	1,536	4,515 (2018)	33.56%	Coal	NRG Energy	
104	Ormond Beach (Note: To be decommissioned by the end of 2021.)		California	34°7′45″N 119°10′8″W	1,516	186 (2018)	1.40%	Natural gas	GenOn	
105	Montour		Pennsylvania	41°4′13″N 76°39′52″W	1,504	2,620 (2018)	19.89%	Coal	Talen Energy	
106	Castaic		California	34°35′14″N 118°39′24″W	1,500	232 (2018)	1.77%	Hydro (pumped-storage)	California DWR (50%); LADWP (50%)	
107	Northport		New York	40°55′22″N 73°20′34″W	1,500	2,684 (2018)	20.43%	Natural gas (75%); Fuel oil (25%)	National Grid USA	

== Largest power stations under construction ==
List of the electrical generating facilities under construction in the United States with an expected installed capacity of at least 1,500 MW.

Rank	Name	Image	State	Location	Capacity (MW)	Type	Owner	Year	Ref
1	Chokecherry and Sierra Madre		Wyoming	41°42′N 107°12′W	2,500 - 3,000	Wind	Power Company of Wyoming	2026	
2	Westlands		California	36°10′N 119°56′W	2,000	Solar	Westside Holdings; CIM Group	2025	

== Largest decommissioned power stations ==
List of former electrical generating facilities in the United States that had an installed capacity of at least 1,500 MW at the time of their decommissioning. Facilities that permanently shut down all of their electricity generating units within five years are included.

Rank	Name	Image	State	Location	Capacity (MW)	Type	Owner	Years	Ref
1	Bruce Mansfield		Pennsylvania	40°38′04″N 80°25′01″W	2,490	Coal	FirstEnergy	1976-2019 (43 years)	
2	J.M. Stuart		Ohio	38°38′16″N 83°41′35″W	2,318	Coal	Dynegy (39%); AES Corporation (35%); American Electric Power (26%)	1970-2018 (48 years)	
3	P.H. Robinson		Texas	29°29′15″N 94°58′46″W	2,316	Natural gas	NRG Energy	1966-2009 (43 years)	
4	San Onofre		California	33°22′8″N 117°33′18″W	2,254	Nuclear (PWR)	SCE (78.2%); SDG&E (20%); City of Riverside (1.8%)	1968-2013 (45 years)	
5	Navajo		Navajo Nation	36°54′12″N 111°23′25″W	2,250	Coal	U.S. Bureau of Reclamation (24.3%); Salt River Project (21.7%); Others (54%)	1974-2019 (45 years)	
6	W. H. Sammis		Ohio	40°31′48″N 80°37′51″W	2,220	Coal	FirstEnergy	1960-2023 (63 years)	
7	Zion		Illinois	42°26′46″N 87°48′10″W	2,080	Nuclear (PWR)	Exelon	1973-1998 (25 years)	
8	Mystic		Massachusetts	42°23′29″N 71°04′01″W	2,001	Natural gas (70.8-99.6%); Fuel oil (0.4-29.2%)	Exelon	1943-2024 (81 years)	
9	Monticello		Texas	33°5′28″N 95°2′17″W	1,880	Coal	Luminant	1974-2018 (44 years)	
10	San Juan		New Mexico	36°48′06″N 108°26′19″W	1,798	Coal	PNM Resources	1973-2022 (49 years)	
11	Mohave		Nevada	35°08′42″N 114°35′19″W	1,636	Coal	SCE (56%); Salt River Project (20%); Others (24%)	1971-2005 (34 years)	
12	Harllee Branch		Georgia	33°11′38″N 83°17′59″W	1,539	Coal	Georgia Power	1961-2015 (54 years)	
13	Muskingum River		Ohio	39°35′18″N 81°40′57″W	1,529	Coal	American Electric Power	1953-2015 (62 years)	
14	Johnsonville		Tennessee	36°1′40″N 87°59′12″W	1,500	Coal	Tennessee Valley Authority	1951-2017 (66 years)	

== See also ==
- List of largest power stations in the world
- List of power stations in the United States by type
- List of coal-fired power stations in the US
- List of natural gas-fired power stations in the United States
- List of nuclear power plants in the United States
- List of hydroelectric power stations in the United States
- Pumped storage power plants in the US
