= Morgans Landing, West Virginia =

Morgans Landing
- Unincorporated community
- Location within the state of West Virginia Morgans Landing (the United States)
- Coordinates: 38°28′51″N 81°50′20″W
- Country: United States
- State: West Virginia
- County: Putnam
- Time zone: UTC-5 (Eastern (EST))
  - Summer (DST): UTC-4 (EDT)
- GNIS feature ID: 1740745

Morgans Landing is an unincorporated community in Putnam County, West Virginia, United States. The community is located at the mouth of Bills Creek on the Kanawha River along U.S. Route 35.

The town is home to American Electric Power's John E. Amos Power Plant.
