= Williams station =

Williams station may refer to:

== Transportation stations ==
- Williams station (Muni Metro), a light rail station in San Francisco
- Williams Station, a Pony Express station which was the site of the Williams Station massacre and the Battle of Williams Station
- Williams Depot, a historic train station in Williams, Arizona
- Williams Junction station, a former train station in Williams Junction, Arizona

== Other ==
- Williams Station power plant, a coal-fired power plant in South Carolina
