= Dry Fork Power Station =

Coal power station in Wyoming, USA

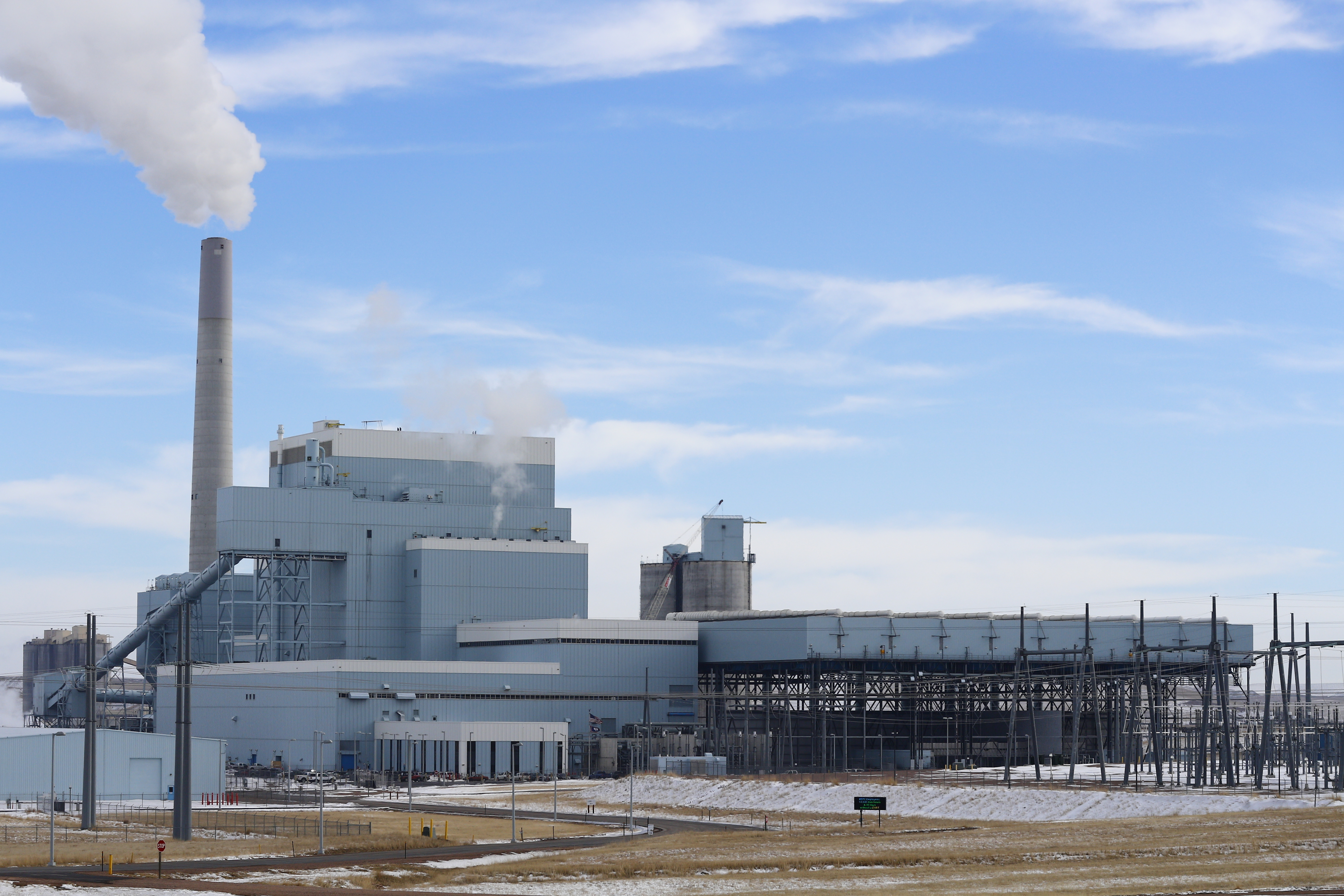
- Country: United States
- Coordinates: 44.3892°N 105.4613°W

Dry Fork power station is a coal-fired power station near Gillette in the U.S. state of Wyoming. As of 2023 it is claimed to be the only US coal-fired power station which is cost competitive with renewable power.
