= Antelope Valley Station =

Coal-fired power plant in the United States

Antelope Valley Power Plant
- Country: United States
- Coordinates: 47°22′14″N 101°50′08″W
- Owner: Basin Electric Power Cooperative

Power generation
- Nameplate capacity: 954 MW

Antelope Valley Station is a coal-fired power plant in the United States in North Dakota. One of the reasons it is significant is because of environmental damage from local coal mining and pollution from the plant. As of 2026, it is estimated that the plant causes 28 deaths per year due to soot and smog pollution.
