= West County Energy Center =

Natural gas power plant in Palm Beach County, Florida

- Country: United States
- Location: Palm Beach County, Florida
- Coordinates: 26°42′0″N 80°22′30″W
- Status: Operational
- Commission date: 2009
- Owner: Florida Power & Light

Thermal power station
- Primary fuel: Natural gas
- Cooling source: Reclaimed water from Palm Beach Co. Utilities
- Combined cycle?: Yes

Power generation
- Units operational: 9 × 250MW Gas turbines 3 × 500MW Steam turbines
- Make and model: MHI M501G
- Nameplate capacity: 3,750 MW

The West County Energy Center is a natural gas power plant in Palm Beach County, Florida. The power plant features three 1,250MW multi-shaft combined cycle gas turbine generating units on a 220-acre (89 ha) site. The facility has been online since 2009, with all three generators reaching completion in 2011. It is the largest natural gas power plant in the United States.

== See also ==
- List of largest power stations in the United States
