= Cross Generating Station =

Coal power station in the United States

- Country: United States
- Location: Pineville, South Carolina
- Coordinates: 33°22′9″N 80°6′51″W
- Status: Operational
- Owner: Santee Cooper

Thermal power station
- Primary fuel: Refined coal
- Turbine technology: Steam Turbine

Power generation
- Units operational: 1 x 590.9 MW 1 x 556.2 MW 1 x 591 MW 1 x 652 MW
- Nameplate capacity: 2,390 MW
- Annual net output: 8,375 GWh (2019)

Cross Generating Station is a 2,390 MW, four unit coal-fired power station located in Pineville, South Carolina. It is owned by Santee Cooper, formally known as the South Carolina Public Service Authority. The nameplate capacity of each unit is 590.9 MW, 556.2 MW, 591 MW, and 652 MW respectively. In 2016, Cross switched from using higher quality bituminous coal, to refined coal, which is a lower quality coal that is refined to release less toxins and is backed by the US government. The future of the plant has become more uncertain due to downward trends in use, talks of shuttering the station, and converting it to natural gas. However, no official statements have been made on the future of the plant.

== Environmental impact ==
In 2018, Cross Generating Station released 8,969,208 tons of CO_{2}, 3,230 tons of SO_{2}, and 3,233 tons of NO_{x}. Cross has a pond and a landfill that store coal ash from the site. An additional pond and landfill was closed down in 2017.

== See also ==
- List of coal-fired power stations in the United States
- List of power stations in South Carolina
- Coal power in the United States
- List of Power stations in the United States
- List of largest power stations in the United States
- Energy in the United States
- Coal mining in the United States
- Electricity sector of the United States
- Coal-fired power plant
- List of natural gas-fired power stations in the United States
