= Plum Point Energy Station =

Coal-fired power plant in Arkansas

Coordinates: 35.6636°N 89.9481°W

Plum Point Energy Station is a coal-fired power plant in Arkansas.
