= Clay Boswell Energy Center =

Coordinates: 47°15′43″N 93°39′9″W

Clay Boswell Energy Center is a coal-fired power plant in Minnesota.
