= Cleco Holdings =

Electric power company headquartered in the Central Louisiana city Pineville

Cleco
- Company type: Private
- Industry: Electric power industry
- Founded: 1906; 120 years ago
- Headquarters: Pineville, Louisiana, US
- Area served: 24 Louisiana parishes: Acadia; Allen; Avoyelles; Beauregard; Calcasieu; Catahoula; DeSoto; Evangeline; Grant; Iberia; Jefferson Davis; LaSalle; Natchitoches; Rapides; Red River; Sabine; St. Landry; St. Martin; St. Mary; St. Tammany; Tangipahoa; Vermillion; Vernon; Washington
- Services: Electricity
- Owner: Macquarie Infrastructure and Real Assets, British Columbia Investment Management Corporation, John Hancock Financial, and others
- Number of employees: 1,300 (2023)
- Subsidiaries: Cleco Power LLC; Cleco Cajun LLC; Cleco Support Services LLC
- Website: www.cleco.com

Cleco Corporate Holdings LLC (formerly the Central Louisiana Electric Company) is an electric power company headquartered in the Central Louisiana city Pineville. It operates a regulated electric utility company, Cleco Power, that serves approximately 290,000 retail customers in Louisiana. Cleco also operates an unregulated wholesale electricity business.

== History ==
Cleco's roots go back to the 1906 installation of a 25 kWh Corliss steam-driven generating plant in Bunkie, Louisiana.

In 1914, a 50 kWh diesel engine was added to the plant to produce ice and light; and in 1935, the Bunkie plant, called Louisiana Ice & Utilities, reorganized into Louisiana Ice & Electric Company.

Because ice was necessary long before electricity, ice manufacturing fostered the early development of the South's electric industry. Small steam or internal combustion electric motors powered the machinery that ran ice plants. Ice companies used power to light the plants and distributed excess energy to nearby homes and businesses. As demand increased, more facilities were needed to supply electricity and, eventually; manufacturing and delivering electricity became more important than making ice.

In 1945, the company changed its name to Central Louisiana Electric Company, Inc. (CLECO), and in 1998, to Cleco Corp. (Cleco).

On March 28, 2016, the Louisiana Public Service Commission in a 4–1 vote approved the sale of Cleco for $4.9 billion to a foreign purchasing group led by Macquarie Infrastructure and Real Assets, British Columbia Investment Management Corporation, John Hancock Financial, and other infrastructure investors. Cleco shareholders and area business leaders spoke strongly in support of the purchase. On April 13, the company restructured and became known as Cleco Corporate Holdings LLC.

In February, 2018, Cleco Corporate Holdings LLC, owner of regulated electric utility Cleco Power, announced that it plans to acquire NRG South Central Generating LLC (South Central), a subsidiary of NRG Energy, Inc. Under the terms of the agreement, Cleco will acquire eight generating assets totaling 3,555 MW, transmission operations and contracts to provide wholesale power to nine Louisiana cooperatives, three wholesale municipal customers and one electric utility. The assets will be acquired through a new unregulated subsidiary, Cleco Cajun LLC. Upon closing, seven of the generation assets will be managed by Cleco. The Cottonwood plant in Texas will be leased back to NRG, who will operate it until May 2025. The sale was completed on February 4, 2019.

In 2019, Cleco placed into service its St. Mary Clean Energy Center in Franklin, La. which is capable of generating up to 50-megawatts of electricity without increasing emissions.

In April of 2022, Cleco Power announced Project Diamond Vault, a new, state-of-the-art carbon capture facility to be located at the company’s Brame Energy Center. Project Diamond Vault will re-engineer Cleco’s existing Madison 3 plant to reduce 95% or more of its carbon dioxide emissions through carbon capture and sequestration (CCS) technology. Later in the year, Cleco Power and D.E. Shaw Renewable Investments announced a long-term renewable energy off-take agreement to include a 240 MWac solar facility to be constructed at Cleco’s recently retired Dolet Hills lignite-fired power plant in DeSoto Parish.

== Operations ==
The company has approximately 1,300 employees serving approximately 290,000 customers in 24 of Louisiana's 64 parishes through its retail business and supplies wholesale power in Louisiana and Mississippi.

Cleco owns nine generating units with a total nameplate capacity of 3,035 megawatts, 12,000 miles of distribution lines and 1,300 miles of transmission lines.
