= Louisa Generating Station =

Power station in Iowa, United States

Coordinates: 41.3173°N 91.0934°W

Louisa Generating Station is a coal-fired power plant in Iowa. As of 2026, it is estimated that the plant causes 28 deaths per year due to soot and smog pollution.
