= Laramie River Station =

Coal-fired power plant in Wyoming

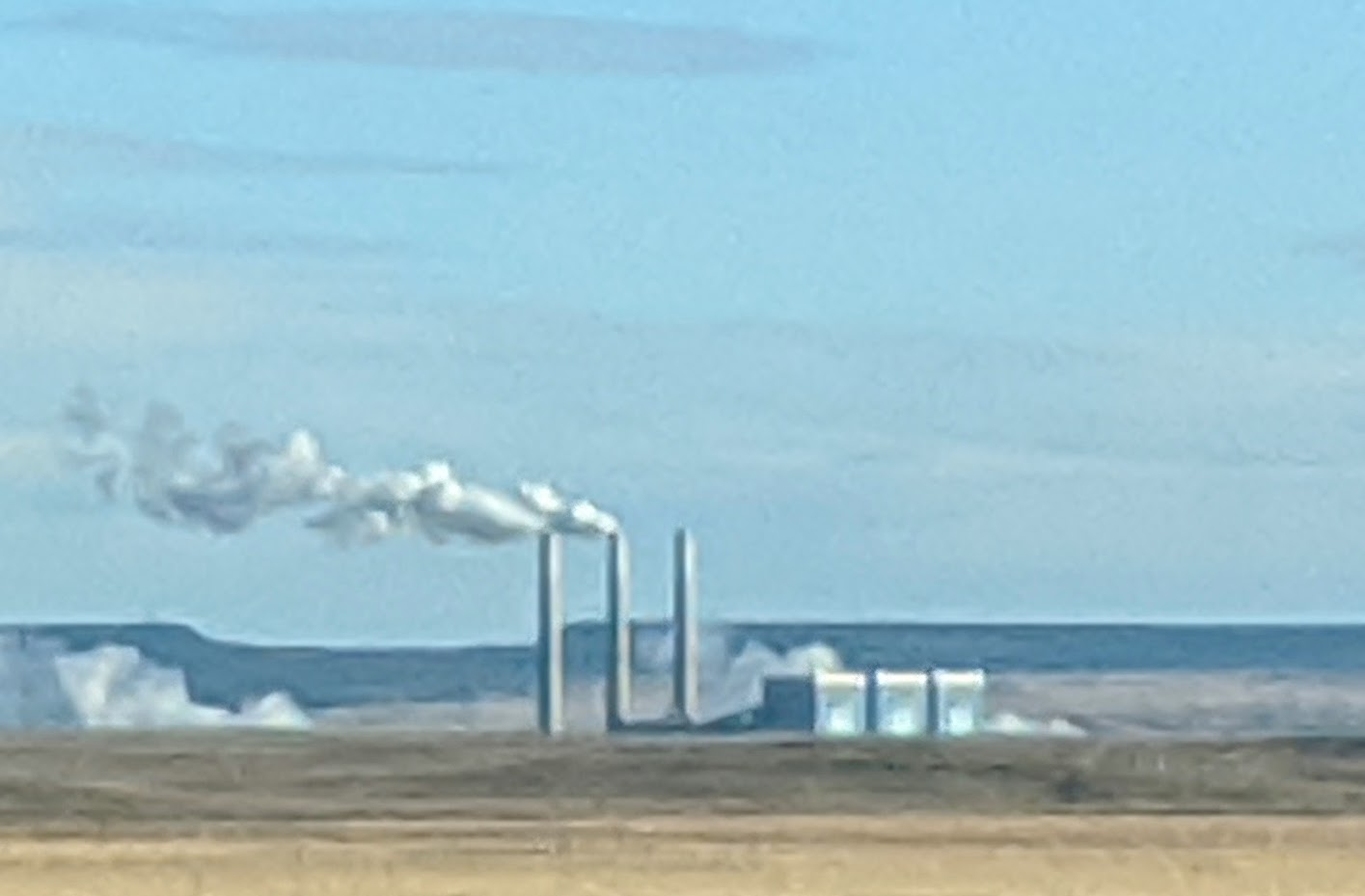
- Laramie River Station
- Location of the Laramie River Station in Wyoming
- Country: United States
- Location: Platte County, Wyoming
- Coordinates: 42°6′26″N 104°53′14″W
- Status: Operational
- Commission date: 1980, last unit: 1982
- Owner: Basin Electric Power Cooperative

Thermal power station
- Primary fuel: Sub-bituminous

Power generation
- Nameplate capacity: 1,710 MW
- Capacity factor: 71.36% (2018)

Laramie River Station is a major coal-fired power plant, located in Platte County, Wyoming. It is operated by Basin Electric Power Cooperative and owned jointly by several of its member cooperatives. It is the second largest coal-fired power plant in Wyoming by capacity. The station currently employs 300 workers. Electricity produced at the station is distributed to across Wyoming, Nebraska and Colorado. Three similar units (each 570 MWe nameplate capacity) were launched in the early 1980s.

== Emissions ==
Due to its size, Laramie River Station is one of the highest emitting power stations in the United States. In 2011 the station was ranked 28th in the nation for Carbon dioxide emissions producing 12.2 million metric tons. A 2011 joint report by the Environmental Integrity Project, Earthjustice, and the Sierra Club found Laramie River Station to be the fourth highest emitter of toxic heavy metals including chromium, arsenic, lead, and mercury.

To continue operations at Laramie River Station, in 2017 Basin Electric Power Cooperative reached an agreement with the Environmental Protection Agency to reduce sulfur dioxide emissions from the plant by using SCR and SNCR equipment. Emissions control equipment became operational in 2019.

== Incidents ==
In September 2009, 17 welders were unknowingly exposed to radioactive element Caesium-137.

On May 19, 2013, an explosion injured 3 workers following an outbreak of fires at the plant on the previous week.

== See also ==
- List of power stations in Wyoming
- List of largest power stations in the United States
