= Hawthorn Power Station =

Coal-fired power plant in Missouri

Coordinates: 39°7′50″N 94°28′41″W

Hawthorn Power Station is a coal-fired power plant in Missouri.
