= Big Cajun 2 Power Plant =

Coordinates: 30.7272°N 91.3686°W

Big Cajun 2 Power Plant is a coal-fired power plant in Louisiana.
