= Muskogee Generating Station =

Power station in Oklahoma

Coordinates: 35°45′42″N 95°17′16″W

Muskogee Generating Station is a power plant in Oklahoma which burns coal and gas. As of 2026, it is estimated that the plant causes 9 deaths per year due to soot and smog pollution.
