= Baldwin Energy Complex =

Coal-fired power station in Illinois

- Country: United States
- Coordinates: 38°12′18″N 89°51′16″W

Power generation
- Nameplate capacity: 1,259.6 MW

Baldwin Energy Complex is a coal-fired power plant near Baldwin, Illinois, United States. It is adjacent to Baldwin Lake and features three coal-powered units.

== History ==
Commissioned in July 1970, the station was built in the mid-1970s and soon became the United States' largest source of sulfur dioxide, and was among the top facilities in emissions of carbon dioxide, nitrogen oxide, and mercury. Operating for around 30 years without any modern pollution controls, a judge ruled in favor of the United States Department of Justice, the United States Environmental Protection Agency, and the State of Illinois in a 2005 lawsuit, finding that the facility violated the Clean Air Act, forcing the facility to reduce its emission of hazardous chemicals. The station's owner, the Illinois Power Company, and its successor, Dynegy, were found responsible and forced to spend $500 million between that year and 2012 to upgrade the facility's pollution controls. The Chicago Tribune found that in actuality, the company spent $1 billion on pollution control upgrades at the facility.

In 2020, the facility's owner, Vistra Corp., announced it would close the Baldwin facility in 2025. At the time, the company was only operating one of the facility's three coal-fired units. The decreasing price of renewable energy sources like solar power and wind power was cited as one of the reasons for the decrease in coal production and the closure announcement. However, in November 2024, Vistra announced the Baldwin facility would remain open until 2027, with President Donald Trump offering an exemption from strict pollution regulations for the facility in April 2025.
