= North Omaha Power Plant =

Coal-fired power plant in Nebraska, United States

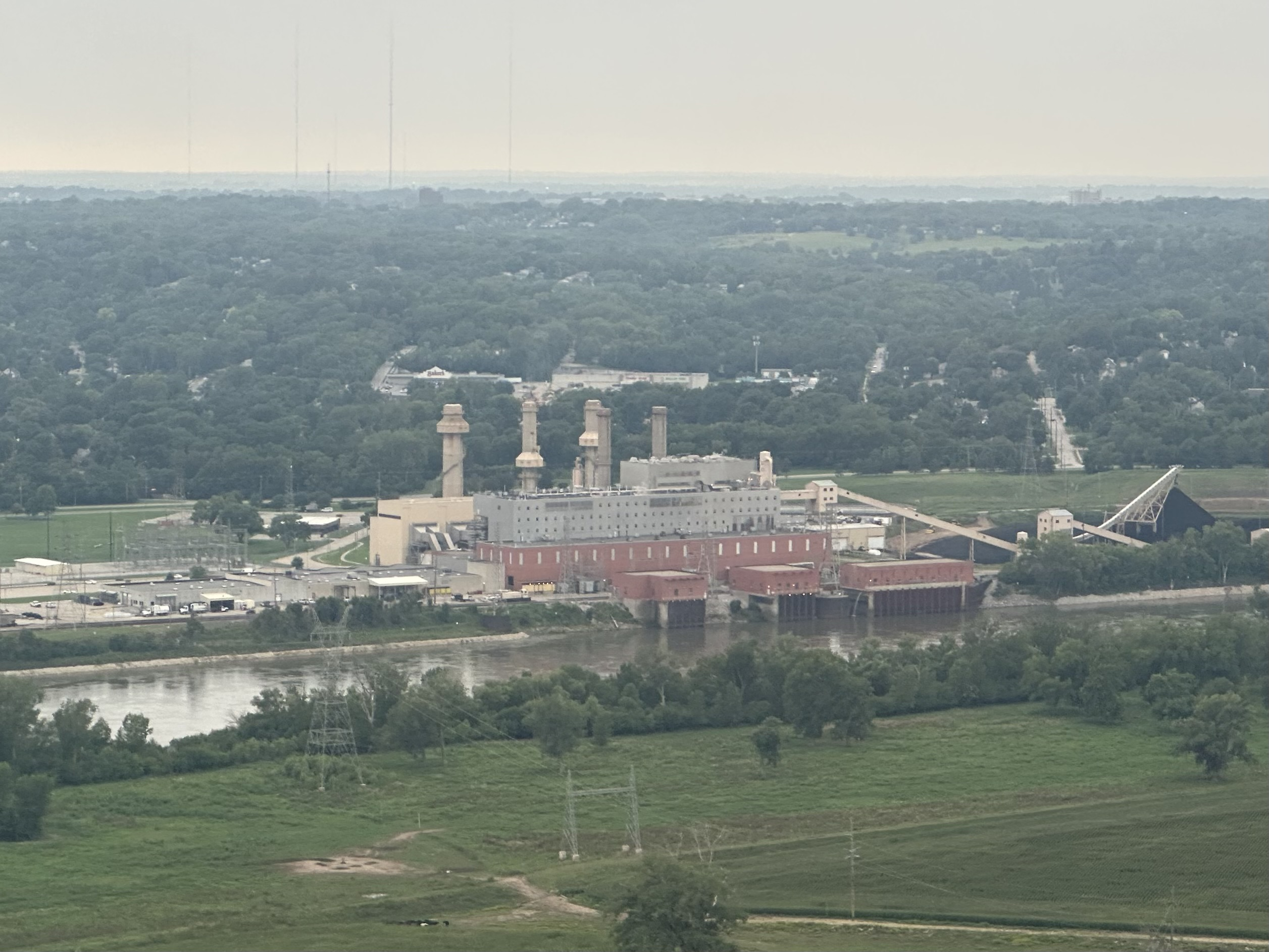
- Country: United States
- Location: Omaha, Nebraska
- Coordinates: 41°19′45″N 95°56′41″W
- Status: Operational

Power generation
- Nameplate capacity: 644.7 MW

North Omaha Power Plant is a coal-fired power station in the U.S. state of Nebraska. It is operated by the Omaha Public Power District (OPPD). The operator says it will keep burning coal until at least 2028.
