= Brame Energy Center =

Coordinates: 31.3971°N 92.7181°W

Brame Energy Center is a gas, other fuel and coal-fired power plant in Louisiana.
