= Ottumwa Generating Station =

Power station in Iowa, United States

- Country: United States
- Coordinates: 41°05′50″N 92°33′18″W

Ottumwa Generating Station is a coal-fired power plant in Iowa. As of 2026, it is estimated that the plant causes 8 deaths per year due to soot and smog pollution.
