= Roxboro Power Station =

Roxboro Steam Plant
- Country: United States
- Location: Semora, North Carolina
- Coordinates: 36.478833°N 79.070889°W
- Status: Operational
- Commission date: 1966
- Owner: Duke Energy

Thermal power station
- Primary fuel: Coal
- Cooling source: Hyco lake

Power generation
- Nameplate capacity: 2,422 MW

Roxboro Steam Plant is a coal-fired electrical generation facility in Semora, North Carolina.

The plant has four units, the first opened in 1966.

In 2026, the Department of Energy invested $28.4 million into the plant.

== See also ==
- List of largest power stations in the United States
