= Mayo Power Plant =

Coal-fired power station in North Carolina

Coordinates: 36.527°N 78.891°W

Mayo Power Plant is a coal-fired power plant in North Carolina.
