= Seward Power Plant =

Coal-fired power plant in Pennsylvania

- Country: United States
- Coordinates: 40°24′23″N 79°02′00″W

Power generation
- Nameplate capacity: 585 MW

Seward Power Plant is a coal-fired power plant in Pennsylvania.
