= New Madrid Power Plant =

Coordinates: 36°30′55″N 89°33′44″W

New Madrid Power Plant is a coal-fired power plant in Missouri.
