= George Neal North =

Coal power plant in USA

George Neal North Power Plant
- Country: United States
- Coordinates: 42°17′59″N 96°21′42″W

Power generation
- Nameplate capacity: 584.1 MW

George Neal North is a coal-fired power plant in Iowa. As of 2026, it is estimated that the plant causes 14 deaths per year due to soot and smog pollution.
