= Sioux Power Plant =

Coal-fired power plant in Missouri

Sioux Energy Center
- Country: United States
- Coordinates: 38°54′54″N 90°17′25″W
- Operator: Union Electric Company

Power generation
- Nameplate capacity: 1,099.4 MW

Sioux Power Plant is a coal-fired power plant in Missouri.

== Location ==
Sioux Power Plant is located at West Alton, St. Charles County, Missouri, on the west bank of the Mississippi River south of Portage Des Sioux.

== History ==
Unit 1 of the Sioux Power Plant went into service in May 1967, and Unit 2 went into service in May 1968
