= Comanche Generating Station =

Coal-fired power plant in the United States

Comanche Power Plant
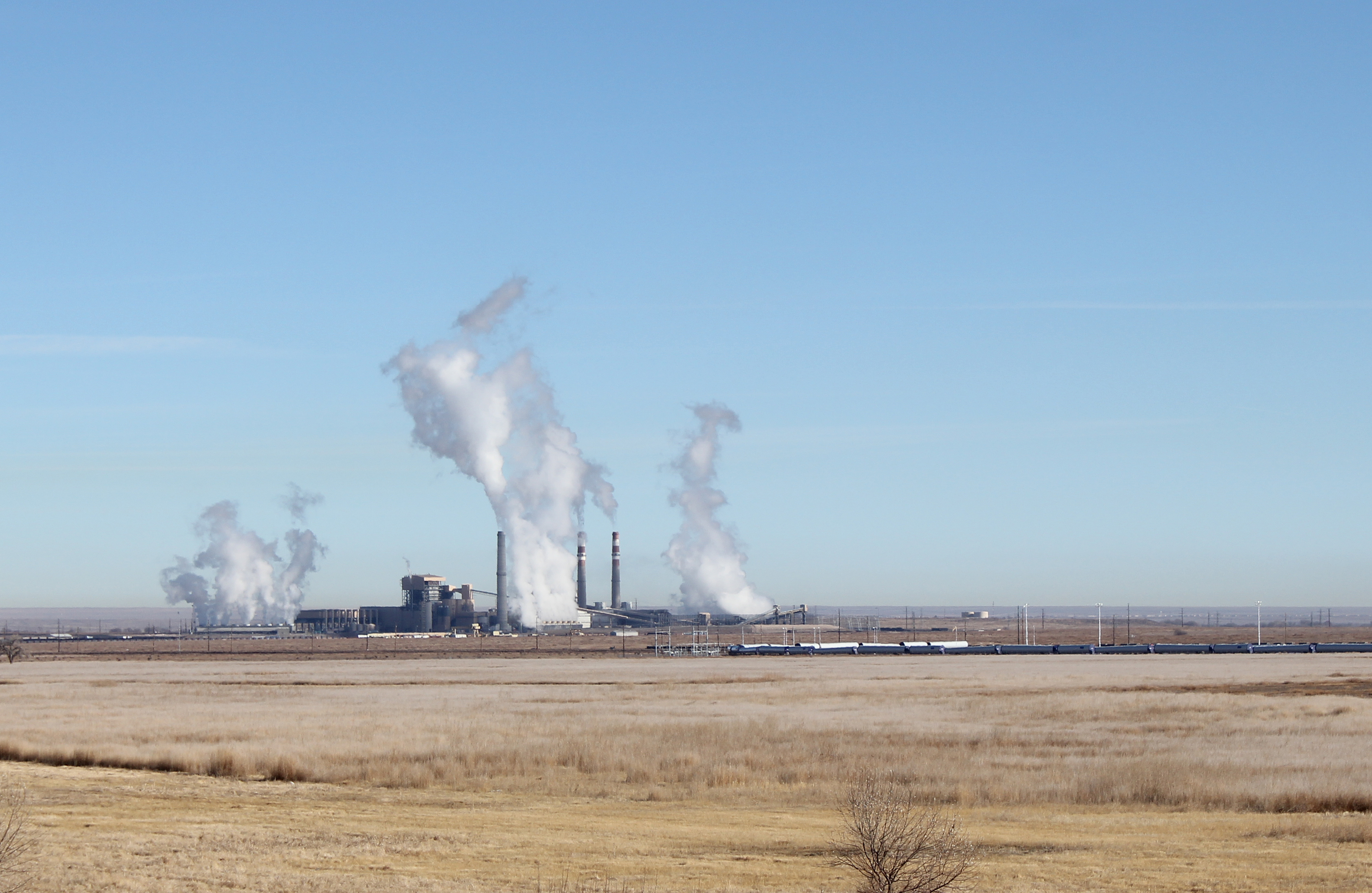
- The station in 2014
- Country: United States
- Coordinates: 38°12′32″N 104°34′32″W

Power generation
- Nameplate capacity: 1,252.8 MW; 1,635.3 MW

Comanche Generating Station is a coal-fired power plant in Colorado. Xcel Energy plans to repair it. It is notable because it is part of the political controversy about coal power in the United States.
