= Tolk Power Plant =

Coordinates: 34°10′59″N 102°34′10″W

Tolk Power Plant is a coal-fired power plant in Texas, United States.
