= Walter Scott Jr. Energy Center =

Power station in Iowa

- Country: United States
- Coordinates: 41°10′44″N 95°50′18″W

Walter Scott Jr. Energy Center is a coal-fired power plant in Iowa. As of 2026, it is estimated that the plant causes 41 deaths per year due to soot and smog pollution.
