= James E. Rogers Energy Complex =

Coordinates: 35.2157°N 81.7609°W

James E. Rogers Energy Complex is a gas and coal-fired power plant in North Carolina operated by Duke Energy.
