= Limestone Generating Station (Texas) =

Coal-fired power plant in the United States

Limestone Power Plant
- Country: United States
- Coordinates: 31°25′19″N 96°15′09″W

Power generation
- Nameplate capacity: 1,849.8 MW

Limestone Generating Station is a coal-fired power plant in the United States, one of the largest in Texas. In 2022 it was the 6th largest emitter of carbon dioxide in the state. In 2022 there was an underground fire of a conveyor belt linking from a disused mine. It is one of 3 most NOx emitting power plants in Texas. Researchers have studied the feasibility of converting it to a nuclear plant.
