= Sandy Creek Energy Station =

Coal-fired power station in Texas, United States

Coordinates: 31°28′28″N 96°57′25″W

Sandy Creek Energy Station is a coal-fired power plant in Texas.
