= Wateree Power Station =

Power station in South Carolina, United States

Coordinates: 33.8263°N 80.6227°W

Wateree Power Station is a coal-fired power plant in South Carolina.
