= Thomas Hill Power Plant =

Coordinates: 39°33′9″N 92°38′15″W

Thomas Hill Power Plant is a coal-fired power plant in Missouri.
