= Roy S. Nelson Generating Plant =

Coordinates: 30.285°N 93.289°W

Roy S. Nelson Generating Plant is a coal-fired power plant in Louisiana. It is owned by Entergy.
