= Craig Generating Station =

Power station in Colorado, United States

Coordinates: 40°27′49″N 107°35′27″W

Craig Generating Station is a coal-fired power plant in Colorado.
