= Newton Power Station =

Coal-fired power plant in Illinois, United States

- Country: United States
- Location: Newton, Illinois
- Coordinates: 38°56′10″N 88°16′41″W
- Status: Operational

Power generation
- Nameplate capacity: 617.4 MW

Newton Power Station is a coal-fired power plant in Illinois.
