= Oklahoma Gas & Electric =

American electric utility company

OGE Energy Corp.
- Type: Public
- Traded as: NYSE: OGE; S&P 400 Component
- Industry: Energy, Natural Gas, Private utility
- Founded: 1902; 124 years ago
- Headquarters: Oklahoma City, Oklahoma, United States
- Key people: [Sean Trauschke] (president, chairman of the Board & CEO); Keith Mitchell (COO); W. Bryan Buckler (CFO)
- Products: Electricity, Natural Gas
- Net income: ▲$387.60 million USD (2013)
- Number of employees: ▲2,292 (2021)
- Website: oge.com

Oklahoma Gas & Electric Company (branded as OG+E or "O-G-and-E") is a regulated electric utility company that serves over 913,000 customers in Oklahoma and Arkansas. It is the leading subsidiary of OGE Energy Corp. (NYSE: OGE), with headquarters in downtown Oklahoma City. OGE Energy is also the former parent of Enogex Inc., a natural gas pipeline business which merged with CenterPoint Energy's midstream business to form Enable Midstream in 2013, in 2021 OGE and CenterPoint sold their general partnership in Enable Midstream to Energy Transfer. OGE Energy and its subsidiaries have about 3,100 employees.

== History ==
OG&E was incorporated on 27 February 1902, by Edward H. Cooke. They initially provided services in Oklahoma City. In 1910 they acquired the El Reno Gas and Electric Company. By 1921 the business was operating in 27 towns and by 1924 they were operating in 88 towns. Subsequent to buying the Belle Isle Amusement Park in 1928, they built the Belle Isle Station power plant. In 1936 they purchased the Western Light and Power Company, based in northwestern Oklahoma. They created the nation's first gas/steam turbine at the Belle Isle Station power plant in 1949. By 1952 the company had 280,000 customers. They merged with Enogex in 1986. In 1997, OG&E reorganized as a holding company, OGE Energy, with OG&E and Enogex (now part of Enable Midstream) as its operating companies. By 2000, the company had 735,000 customers in Oklahoma and western Arkansas.

In 2002, an ice storm damaged the supply system, causing outages and costing the company $150 million to fix. A member of the Midwest Mutual Assistance and Southeast Electrical Exchange, in 2025 65 employees worked for 14 days, assisting Entergy Texas and Louisiana, in the aftermath of hurricane Laura.

== OG&E ==
OG&E Electric Services serves more than 913,000 customers in central and western Oklahoma and western Arkansas, and has no current wholesale power commitments. OG&E, with seven power plants is capable of producing about 6,100 megawatts from fossil fuels, also owns three wind farms and two small solar farms. OG&E also has long-term power purchase agreements with three non-owned wind farms. In 2017 OG&E generated 54% of electricity from low-sulfur Wyoming coal and 39 percent from natural gas with the remaining 7 percent coming from renewables, mostly wind.

OG&E was the first electric company in Oklahoma to offer wind power as a choice to its retail customers in 2003. OG&E owned roughly 170 megawatts of wind power and President and CEO Peter Delaney announced plans in 2007 that would increase wind power to 770 megawatts.

OG&E is the largest electric utility in the state of Oklahoma. The company delivers all of its electricity across an interconnected transmission and distribution system spanning 30,000 square miles (78,000 km^{2}). OG&E is a member of the Southwest Power Pool, a regional transmission operator spanning the Midwest from Texas to North Dakota.

In December 2016, OG&E announced that it gave out $7.5 million in "energy efficiency incentives to businesses, schools and government buildings in 2016." A total of 750 organizations benefited from the project. Secondary schools received around $650,000; universities received around $365,000. In one school district, 1 million kWh were cut down through energy-saving projects.

A proliferation of data centres planned in the state has resulted in OG&E investing in increasing capacity to meet demand, whilst seeking to pass on costs to customers. In 2026, the company reached an agreement with Google to power new data centres, with Google paying for infrastructure costs and connecting solar parks to the grid to help increase capacity.

== Enogex ==
Enogex is engaged in natural gas gathering, processing, transportation, storage and marketing. Enogex operates a natural gas pipeline system with about 8,000 miles (13,000 km) of pipe, six processing plants, and 23 billion cubic feet (650×10^{6} m^{3}) of gas storage capacity, principally in Oklahoma. In 2013, it was decided that Enogex would be merged with a portion of CenterPoint Energy's operations in a limited partnership to be called Enable Midstream Partners.

== OGE Energy Resources ==
OGE Energy Resources conducts the company's energy marketing and related activities. Operating in the national commodities markets for electricity and natural gas, Energy Resources' primary role is to optimize the generation, transmission and pipeline assets of OGE Energy.
