= Nebraska City Station =

Power station in Nebraska, United States

Coordinates: 40.6208°N 95.7752°W

Nebraska City Station is a coal-fired power plant in Nebraska.
