= Brunner Island Steam Electric Station =

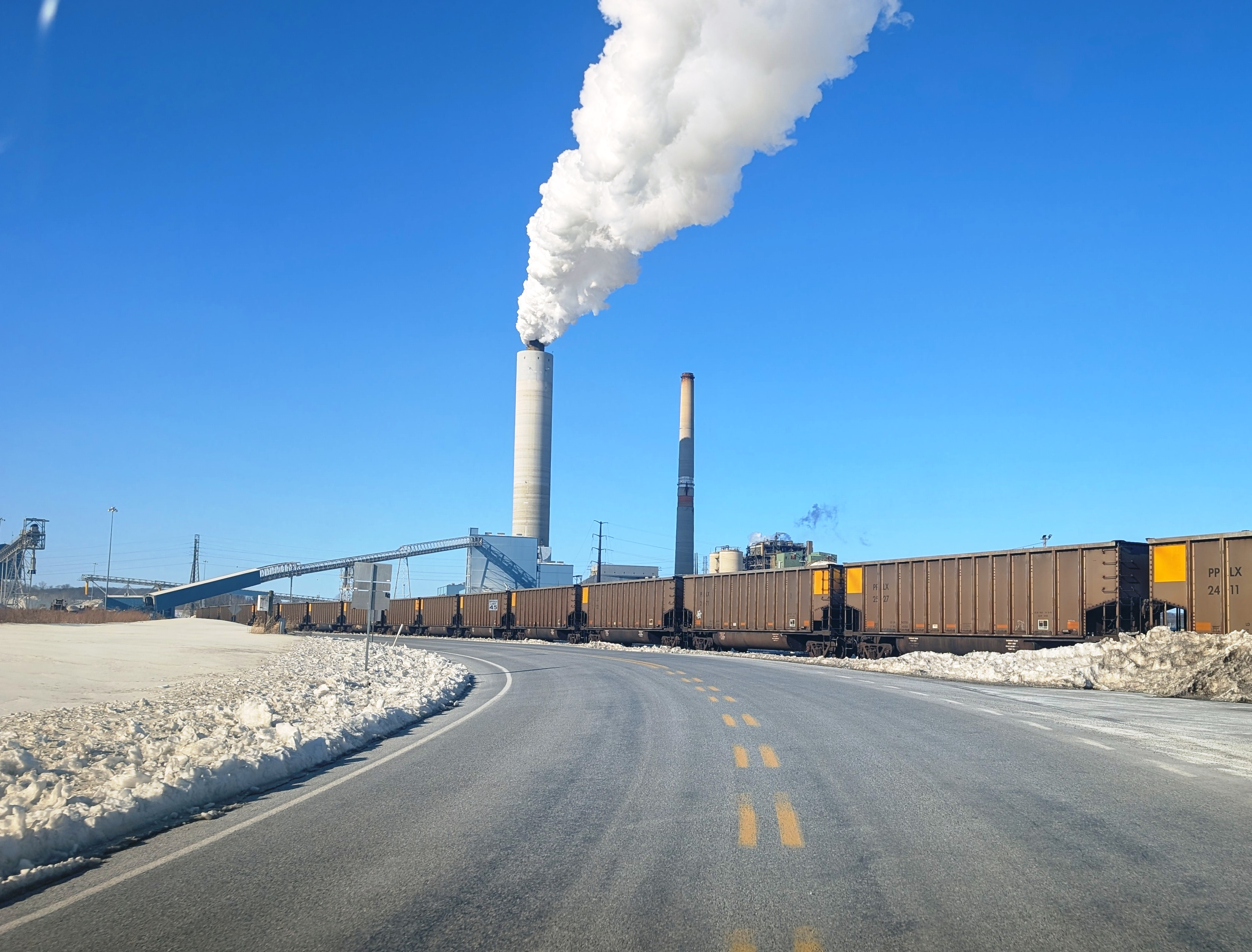
- Plant as seen from Wago Road
- Country: United States
- Location: East Manchester Township, York County, near York Haven, Pennsylvania
- Coordinates: 40°05′44″N 76°41′49″W
- Status: Operational
- Commission date: Unit 1: June 1961; Unit 2: October 1965; Unit 3: June 1969
- Owners: Talen Energy, formally PPL

Thermal power station
- Primary fuel: Bituminous coal Natural gas
- Cooling source: Susquehanna River; Cooling Tower (since 2009)

Power generation
- Units operational: 3
- Nameplate capacity: 1567 MW_{e}

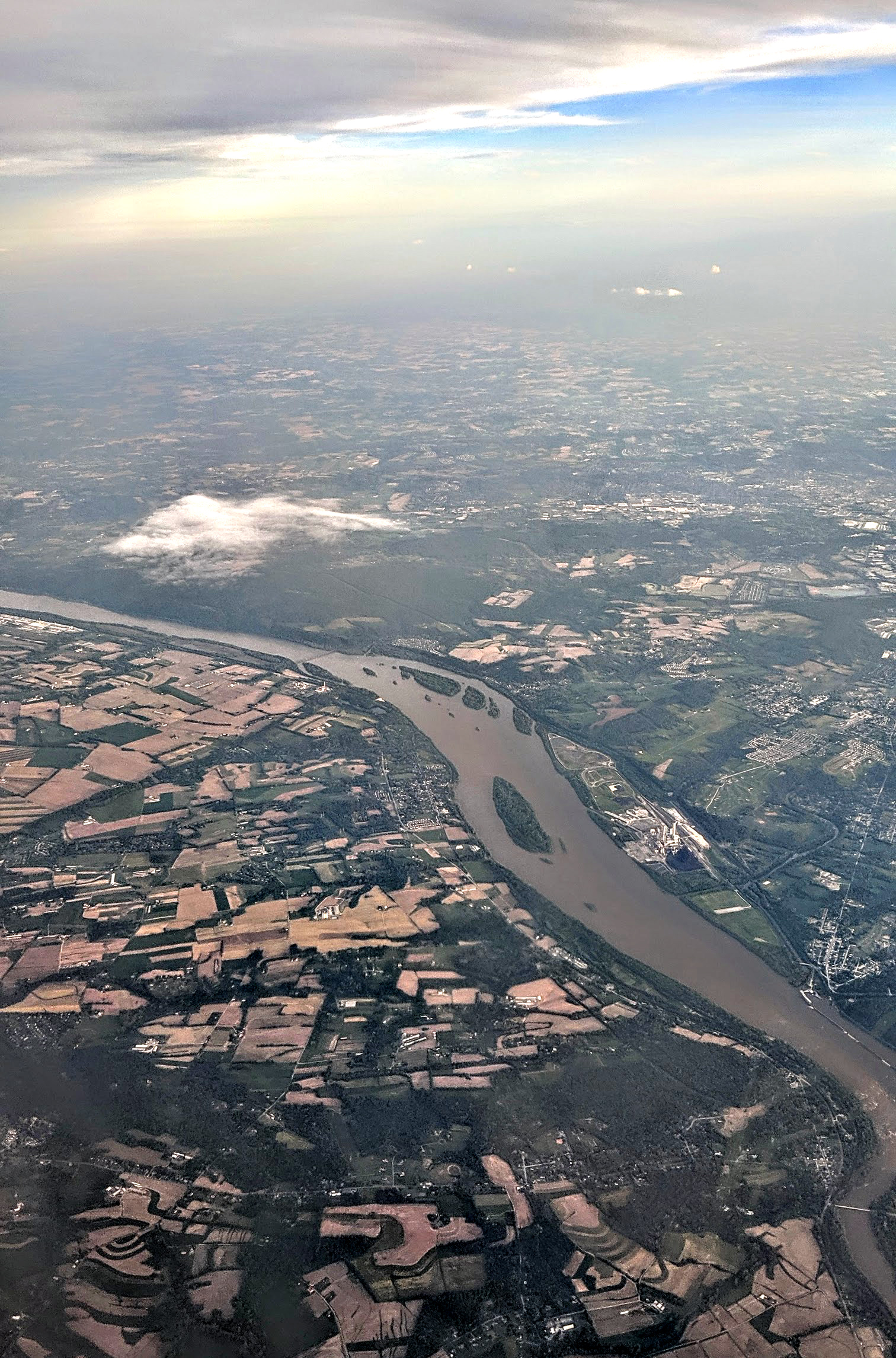
Aerial view from the north of the Susquehanna River at Bainbridge, Pennsylvania, (on left bank), with the Brunner Island Steam Electric Station (on right bank island)

Brunner Island Steam Electric Station is a coal and natural gas-powered electrical generation facility in York County, Pennsylvania. It occupies most of the area of the eponymous island on Susquehanna River. The power plant has three major units, which came online in 1961, 1965, and 1969, with respective generating capacities of 334 MW, 390 MW, and 759 MW (in winter conditions). In addition, three internal combustion generators (2.8 MWe each) were installed in 1967. Talen Energy will stop coal use at the plant in 2028.

== Environmental impact ==
PPL, the owner of the plant at the time, announced in 2005 that it would begin to install scrubbers at the plant and that installation would be complete by 2009. The scrubbers, PPL says, are intended to annually remove 100,000 tons of sulfur. The facility was cited as one of several facilities in the region by a USA Today study of air quality around area schools as a potential source of significant pollutants. Fly ash from the Brunner Island facility is approved for use in construction projects, especially for "use in concrete mixes to reduce alkali silica reactivity of aggregate."

=== Greenhouse gas emissions ===
In 2021, the facility produced 2.28 megatonnes of CO_{2} equivalent (tCO_{2}e) greenhouse gas emissions. This is the same climate impact as 491,312 gasoline-powered passenger vehicles driven for one year. With respect to greenhouse gas emissions, out of 89 power stations in the state, Brunner Island ranks as the 13th most polluting.

=== Sulphur dioxide emissions ===
In 2006, Brunner Island ranked 27th on the list of most-polluting major power station in the US in terms of sulphur dioxide gas emission rate: it discharged 20.49 pounds (9.29 kg) of SO_{2} for each MWh of electric power produced that year (93,545 tons of SO_{2} per year in total). Scrubbers began operation in 2009, removing about 90-percent of sulfur dioxide emissions and reducing mercury emissions. They spray a mixture of crushed limestone and water onto the exhaust gas before it goes out the plant's chimney. Sulfur reacts with the limestone and water in the plant's exhaust, forming synthetic gypsum. This is collected and shipped to a drywall manufacturing company.

=== Waste heat ===
Brunner Island discharges all of its waste heat (about 1.44 times its electrical output) through evaporative cooling towers, installed new in 2009.

=== Conversion to Natural Gas ===
As part of a 2018 out-of-court settlement with the Sierra Club, which had previously sued the plant and its current owner, Talen Energy, over air and water pollution, Brunner Island will eventually completely phase out coal. Brunner Island has stopped burning coal from May to September, which is considered peak smog season. By 2028, the facility will completely switch over to natural gas 12 months of the year.

== See also ==
- List of power stations in Pennsylvania
