= Iatan Generating Station =

Power station in Missouri, United States

Coordinates: 39°26′50″N 94°58′45″W

Iatan Generating Station is a coal-fired power plant in Missouri.
