= Springerville Generating Station =

Coal power plant in Apache County, Arizona, United States

- Official name: Springerville Generating Station
- Country: United States
- Location: Springerville, Arizona
- Coordinates: 34°19′04″N 109°09′55″W
- Owner: Tucson Electric Power

Power generation
- Nameplate capacity: 1,779.2 MW

Springerville Generating Station is a coal-fired power plant in Springerville, Arizona. It is owned by Tucson Electric Power (TEP) and has a generating capacity of 1765.8 MW. TEP announced in 2025 that it plans to switch the plant to a natural gas plant by 2030.
