= Jim Bridger Steam Plant =

Coordinates: 41°44′17″N 108°47′8″W

Jim Bridger Steam Plant is a coal and gas-fired power plant in Wyoming.
