= Stanton Energy Center =

Power station in Orange County, Florida

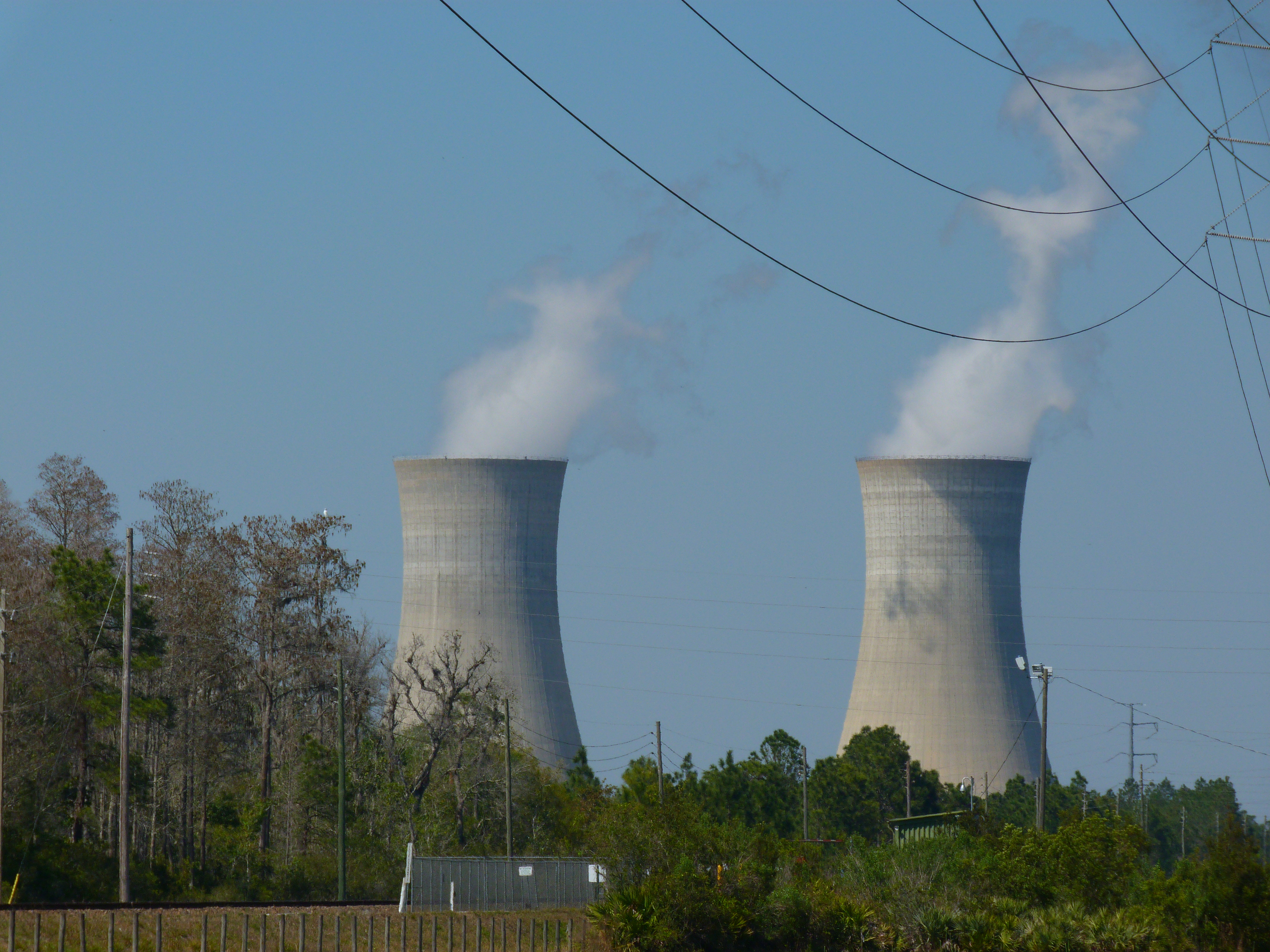
- Stanton Energy Center in March 2017
- Country: United States
- Location: Orlando, Florida
- Coordinates: 28°29′15″N 81°10′03″W
- Status: Operational
- Construction began: Unit 1: December 15, 1982
- Commission date: Unit 1: July 1, 1987 Unit 2: June 1, 1996 Unit A: October 1, 2003 Unit B: February 2010
- Owner: Orlando Utilities Commission
- Operator: Orlando Utilities Commission

Power generation
- Units operational: Units 1-2: 2 x 440 MW
- Nameplate capacity: 1820 MW
- Annual net output: 6,179,834 MW

External links
- Commons: Related media on Commons

The Stanton Energy Center, also known as the Curtis H. Stanton Energy Center, is a solar, gas and coal-fired power plant located in Orlando, Florida. The plant consists of two coal-fired units and two natural gas combined-cycle units. The complex began development in 1980, with Unit 1 being commissioned on July 1, 1987. Unit 1, originally scheduled for decommissioning on May 31, 2026, was forced by an order from the U.S. Department of Energy to continue operating through September 1, 2026.

The center is named after Curtis Stanton, who served as the former general manager of the Orlando Utilities Commission for 35 years.

== Power plant ==
Unit	Reactor type	Capacity		Commercial operation
Unit	Reactor type	Net	Gross	Commercial operation
Unit 1	Coal, water-cooled	440 MW	464.5 MW	July 1, 1987
Unit 2	Coal, water-cooled	440 MW	464.5 MW	June 1, 1996
Unit A	Natural gas, combined-cycle	640 MW	688 MW	October 1, 2003
Unit B	Natural gas, combined-cycle	300 MW	333 MW	February 2010
