= John E. Amos Power Plant =

Coal-fired power station in Winfield, West Virginia

- John E. Amos Power Plant in 2026
- Country: United States
- Location: Winfield Rd., Winfield, West Virginia
- Coordinates: 38°28′29″N 81°49′16″W
- Status: Operational
- Commission date: Unit 1: 1971; Unit 2: 1972; Unit 3: 1973
- Owner: American Electric Power

Thermal power station
- Primary fuel: Coal
- Turbine technology: supercritical, dry-bottom boilers

Power generation
- Nameplate capacity: 2,933 MW

External links
- Commons: Related media on Commons

John E. Amos Power Plant is a three-unit coal-fired power plant owned and operated by Appalachian Power, a subsidiary of American Electric Power (AEP). With a nameplate rating of 2,933 MW, it is the largest generating plant in the AEP system. It was named after John E. Amos, a prominent state senator, Democratic National Committee member from West Virginia, and member of the AEP board of directors.

== Background ==
The plant is located between West Virginia Route 817 (Winfield Road) and the Kanawha River. Coal is delivered to the facility by barge or rail, after which it is stored in the plant's coal yard. The coal yard storage capacity can reach up to 1.75 million tons of coal, while the entire plant consumes an average of 26,000 tons of coal daily at full capacity. The coal is then transported via conveyor belt from the coal yard into the plant, where it is pulverized into a fine, talcum powder-like consistency. Primary fans then blow the ground up coal into boilers where it burns at 1,000 °F (538 °C) to turn water into steam. That steam gets sent into turbines, where it turns blades. These blades act like a windmill and drive a generator that produces electricity at 26,000 volts. Transformers outside the plant step up the voltage to 345,000 volts and 765,000 volts.

Units 1 and 2 are of 816.3 MW nameplate capacity each, and were started up in September 1971, and June 1972 respectively. The boilers off of Units 1 and 2 deliver 5.3 million pounds of steam per hour using 12,500 gallons of water per minute. Containing 6 pulverizers per unit, 120,000 pounds of coal is ground up every hour. Unit 3, rated at 1,300 MW, was started up in October 1973. Unit 3's boiler system delivers 9.775 million pounds of steam per hour. All units are supercritical, dry-bottom boilers powered by a blend of low-sulfur coal and Northern Appalachian Basin high-sulfur coal.

Phil Moye, a spokesman for AEP, said the energy generated at the John Amos Plant is enough to power about 2 million homes. The plant employs around 300 people with a payroll of $27.1 million dollars.

A retirement analysis is to be conducted at Amos with a report due in 2022. The analysis, which will gauge the plant's economic viability and market conditions, is a part of an agreement between Appalachian Power and the Sierra Club.

== Environmental mitigation ==
Appalachian Power installed selective catalytic reduction (SCR) on its three units beginning with Unit 3 in 2002, Unit 2 in 2004, and Unit 1 in 2005. The installation of SCRs reduced nitrogen oxide (NO_{x}) emissions by 90%. The cost of installing all three SCRs totaled $346 million. The construction of flue-gas desulfurization (FGD) equipment at Amos was a $1.3 billion project completed in 2010. The FGD equipment reduced the plant's sulfur dioxide (SO_{2}) emissions by 95%.

== See also ==
- List of coal-fired power stations in the United States
