= Powerton Generating Station =

Coal-fired power plant in Illinois

Powerton Power Plant
- Country: United States
- Coordinates: 40°32′27″N 89°40′47″W

Power generation
- Nameplate capacity: 1,785.6 MW

Powerton Generating Station is a coal-fired power plant located near Pekin, Tazewell County, Illinois, United States. Owned by NRG Energy, it is one of the largest generating facilities in the state. The plant's two units began commercial operation in the early 1970s and have a combined net generating capacity of approximately 1,786 megawatts (MW), supplying power to the regional PJM Interconnection grid.

Since beginning operations in the 1970s, Powerton has been a significant electricity provider for the region but has also been the focus of environmental regulation and legal challenges due to its emissions. In February 2024, NRG Energy announced plans to retire the plant by the end of 2028 to comply with federal wastewater regulations.

== History ==
The Powerton Generating Station was developed in the early 1970s amid growing electricity demand in Illinois. Unit 5, the first of two identical units, began commercial operation in September 1972. Unit 6 followed in December 1975.

The plant was originally built and operated by Commonwealth Edison (ComEd). Following the deregulation of the Illinois electricity market in the late 1990s, ComEd sold its fossil-fuel generating fleet. The Powerton station, along with several other plants, was acquired by Midwest Generation, which operated them for over a decade. In 2014, NRG Energy acquired Midwest Generation, becoming the plant's current owner. In February 2024, NRG Energy announced in a securities filing that the plant is expected to retire by December 31, 2028, to comply with federal wastewater regulations known as Effluent Limitation Guidelines (ELG).
