= Independence Power Plant =

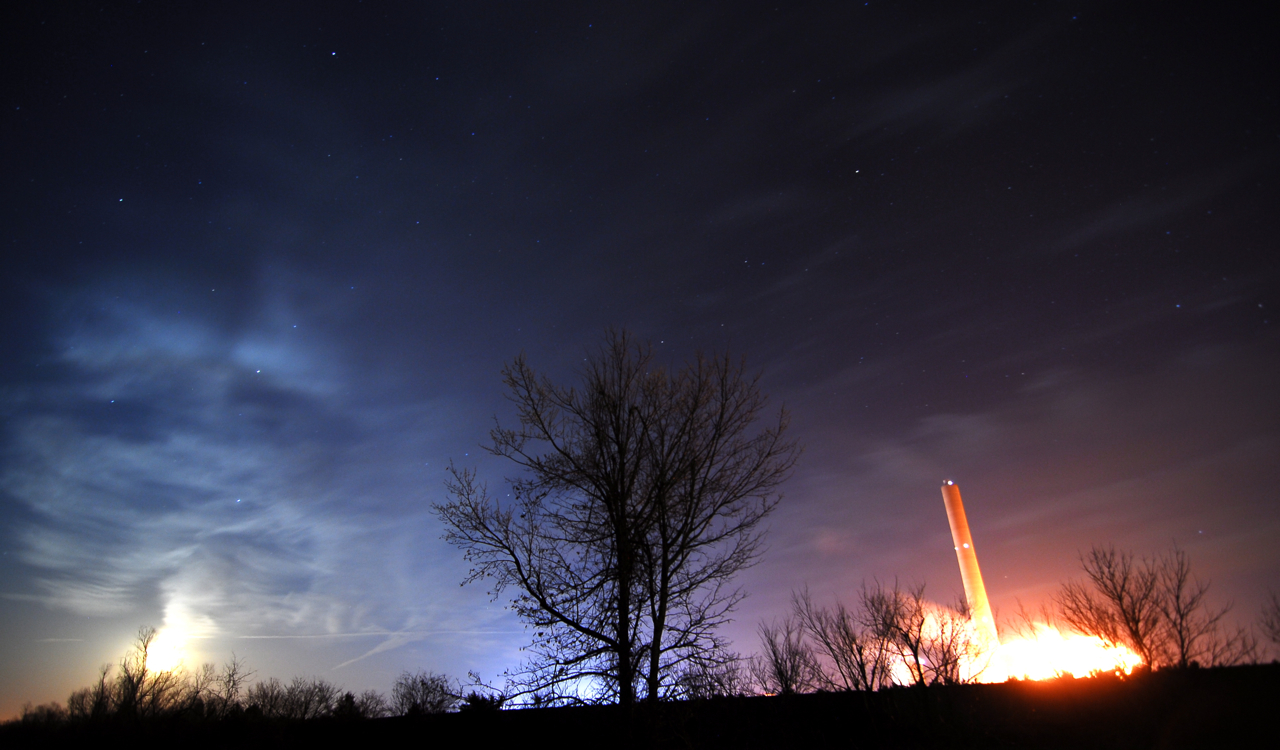
- Official name: Entegy Independence Plant
- Country: United States
- Location: Newark, Independence County, Arkansas
- Coordinates: 35°40′38″N 91°24′35″W
- Status: Operational
- Commission date: 1983 (unit 1), 1984 (unit 2)
- Owner: Entergy (31%)

Power generation
- Units operational: 2
- Nameplate capacity: 1,678 MW

Independence Power Plant is a 1,678-megawatt coal-fired base load power plant near Newark, Arkansas. The plant has two units, rated at 850 MWe each, that came online in 1983 and 1984. The plant is owned in part by Entergy Arkansas. It has a 305-meter chimney built in 1983.

== Emissions ==
In 2013, Environment America ranked the plant 35th on its list of the 100 dirtiest coal-fired power stations in the U.S., reporting that its 2011 emissions were equivalent to 2.3 million passenger vehicles.

The plant released 10,787,400 metric tons of greenhouse gases in 2012 according to the EPA. The emissions in metric tons comprised:

- Carbon dioxide: 10,705,646
- Methane: 25,974
- Nitrous oxide: 55,780

== Phase-out plan ==
In 2018, the owner Entergy announced a plan to close the plant by 2030.

== See also ==
- List of power stations in Arkansas
- Global warming
