= Williams Station power plant =

Coal-fired power plant in South Carolina

Coordinates: 33.0161°N 79.9294°W

Williams Station power plant is a coal-fired power plant in South Carolina.
