= List of natural gas-fired power stations in the United States =

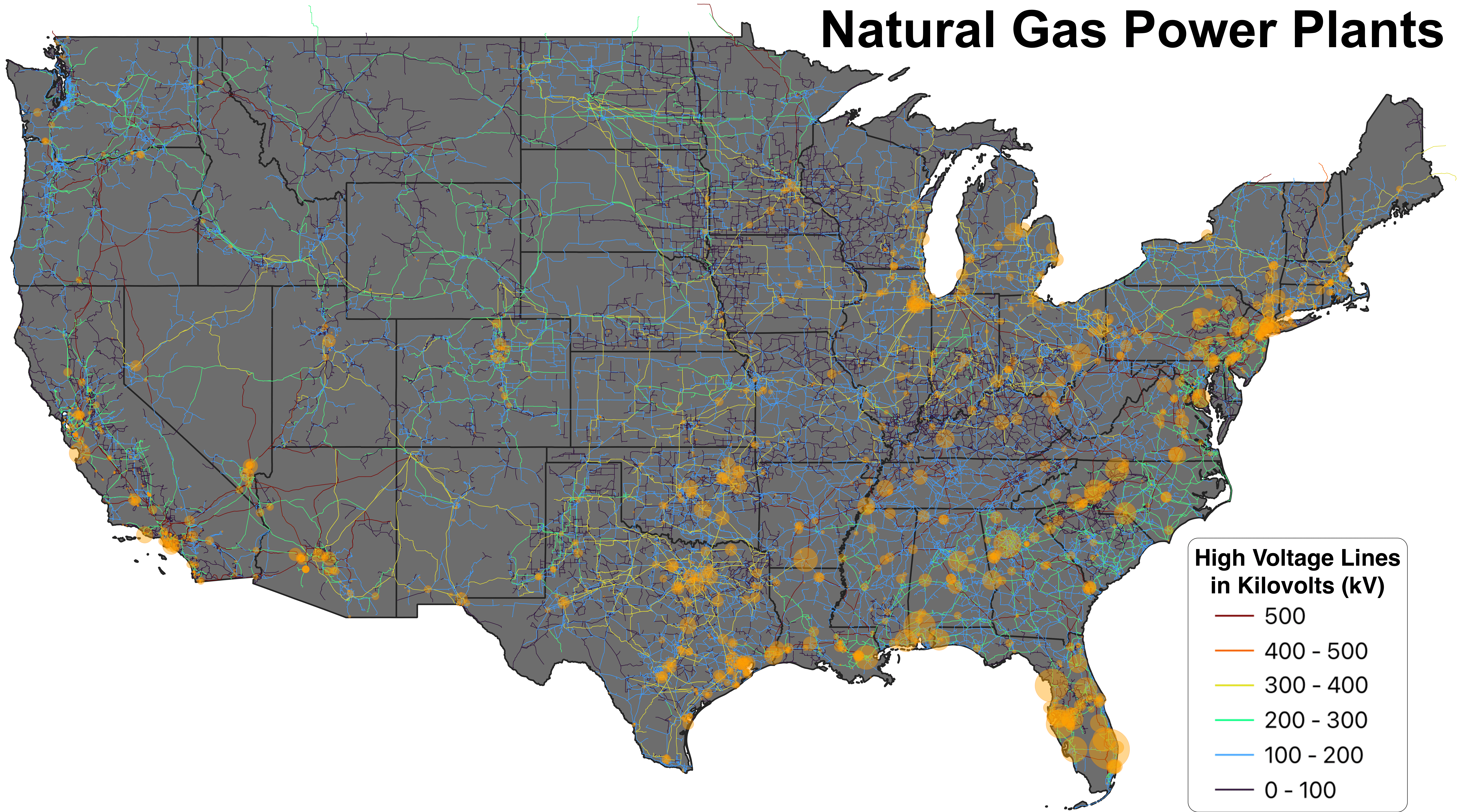
Natural gas power plants in the United States and high-voltage lines

This is a list of the largest operational natural gas-fired power stations in the United States.

In 2019 there were around 1,900 natural gas power stations in the United States, of which about 800 belonged to electric utilities. In 2019, these natural gas plants produced 38% of the United States electricity production, the highest percentage of any source above coal, nuclear and renewables. Natural gas power stations opened at a fast rate throughout the 2010s, quickly replacing aging, dirty, and economically unviable coal-fired power stations, but by the early 2020s new plants were mostly wind and solar with only Texas, Ohio and Pennsylvania continuing to open significant numbers of gas plants.

== Natural gas-fired power stations ==
Name	State	Location	Capacity (MW)	Capacity Factor	Annual Generation (GWh)	CO_{2} Emissions (Tons/year)	Owner	Fuel type	Retirement and Notes	Ref
Alamitos	California	33°46′09″N 118°06′07″W	1,760	6.21%	581 (2019)	428,389 (2019)	AES Corporation	Natural gas	December 31, 2020 (Units 3-5:1,120 MW)	
Chalk Point	Maryland	38°32′37″N 76°41′19″W	2,413	6.88%	495 (2019)	545,329 (2019)	NRG Energy	Bituminous coal Natural gas	June 1, 2021 (Coal)	
Crystal River	Florida	28°58′01.4″N 82°41′52.6″W	3,032		15,044 (2019)	8,019,144 (2019)	Duke Energy	Natural gas (1610 MW) Bituminous coal (1422 MW)		
Curtis H. Stanton	Florida	28°28′56″N 81°09′59″W	1,820	38.76%	1,592 (2019)	632,637 (2019)	Orlando Utilities Commission	Natural gas		
Fort Myers	Florida	26°41′48″N 81°46′57″W	2,681	39.54%	8,420 (2019)	3,455,041 (2019)	Florida Power & Light	Natural gas		
Forney	Texas	32°45′46″N 96°29′00″W	1,824	65.23%	10,527 (2019)	4,130,220 (2019)	Luminant	Natural gas		
Gila River	Arizona	32°58′36″N 112°41′39″W	2,200	32.13%	8,601 (2019)	3,403,479 (2019)	Salt River Project	Natural gas		
Greensville County	Virginia	36°43′10″N 77°39′12.4″W	1,585		9,860 (2019)	3,435,540 (2019)	Dominion Energy	Natural gas		
H Allen Franklin	Alabama	32°36′28″N 85°05′51″W	1,995.7		12,463 (2019)	4,665,532 (2019)	Southern Power	Natural gas		
Hanging Rock	Ohio	38°34′23″N 82°47′2″W	1,430		9,852 (2019)	3,734,342 (2019)	Dynegy	Natural gas		
Hines	Florida	27°47′22″N 81°52′17″W	2,060	74.08%	13,368 (2018)	5,107,531 (2018)	Duke Energy	Natural gas		
H. L. Culbreath Bayside	Florida	27°54′26″N 82°25′23″W	1,800	42.20%	7,863 (2019)	3,094,472 (2019)	Tampa Electric Company	Natural gas		
Jack McDonough	Georgia	33°49′44.2″N 84°28′07.7″W	2,548		19,072 (2019)	7,051,750 (2019)	Georgia Power	Natural gas		
James M. Barry	Alabama	31°0′22″N 88°0′40″W	2,386.9		12,471 (2019)	6,992,896 (2019)	Alabama Power	Natural gas (1268.4 MW) Bituminous coal (1118.5 MW)		
Lackawanna	Pennsylvania	41°28′19.2″N 75°32′49.9″W	1,665		10,163 (2019)	3,491,221 (2019)	Invenergy Services	Natural gas		
Manatee	Florida	27°36′19″N 82°20′47″W	1,150		10,425 (2019)	4,520,216 (2019)	Florida Power & Light	Natural gas		
Martin	Florida	27°03′11″N 80°33′00″W	2,225	66.09%	11,745 (2019)	4,413,919 (2019)	Florida Power & Light	Natural gas (96.6%) Solar (3.4%)		
Midland	Michigan	43°35′10″N 84°13′19″W	1,633	55.20%	8,853 (2019)	4,391,469 (2019)	MCV Limited Partnership	Natural gas		
Midlothian	Texas	32°25′48″N 97°03′18″W	1,650	38.32%	5,537 (2019)	2,249,250 (2019)	American National Power	Natural gas		
Mystic	Massachusetts	42°23′29″N 71°04′01″W	1,998	26.74%	2,188 (2019)	902,707 (2019)	Exelon	Natural gas		
Nine Mile Point	Louisiana	29°56′50.9″N 90°08′49.8″W	2,440		9,833 (2019)	4,598,056 (2019)	Entergy	Natural gas		
Northport	New York	40°55′22″N 73°20′34″W	1,500	20.43%	2,029 (2019)	1,206,207 (2019)	National Grid USA	Natural gas		
Oswego Harbor	New York	43°27′31″N 76°31′55″W	1,804	0.27%	17 (2019)	32,157 (2019)	NRG Energy	Natural gas		
Ormond Beach	California	34°7′45″N 119°10′8″W	1,516	1.40%	161 (2019)	105,136 (2019)	GenOn	Natural gas		
Possum Point	Virginia	37.25°N 86.97°W	1,661	25.59%	2,856 (2019)	1,106,659 (2019)	Dominion Energy	Natural gas		
Ravenswood	New York	40°45′35″N 73°56′45″W	2,480	15.36%	2,299 (2019)	1,097,732 (2019)	Helix Ravenswood	Natural gas		
Sabine	Texas	30°01′24″N 93°52′37″W	1,890	25.32%	3,249 (2019)	2,111,299 (2019)	Entergy	Natural gas		
Sanford	Florida	28°50′34″N 81°19′34″W	2,378	47.85%	8,486 (2019)	3,359,146 (2019)	Florida Power & Light	Natural gas		
Sherwood H Smith	North Carolina	34°50′19.0″N 79°44′22.1″W	2,245		9,393 (2019)	3,874,113 (2019)	Duke Energy	Natural gas		
Turkey Point	Florida	25°26′3″N 80°19′50″W	2,979	75.92%	19,270 (2019)	1,937,291 (2019)	Florida Power & Light	Nuclear (59%) Natural gas (41%)		
Union	Arkansas	33°17′52″N 92°35′18″W	1,980	59.41%	11,267 (2019)	4,344,400 (2019)	Entergy	Natural gas		
Wansley	Georgia	33°24′22.1″N 85°02′11.7″W	1,239		8,847 (2019)	3,287,711 (2019)	Southern Power	Natural gas	Separate from coal fired plant with the same name.	
W. A. Parish	Texas	29°28′34″N 95°38′0″W	3,653	49.53%	14,328 (2019)		NRG Energy	Sub-bituminous coal (73.8%) Natural gas (26.2%)	January 2045 (Units 5, 6, 7 & 8) (Coal)	
Warren County	Virginia	38°58′11.3″N 78°10′39.6″W	1,472.2		8,770 (2019)	3,196,539 (2019)	Dominion Energy	Natural gas		
West County	Florida	26°42′0″N 80°22′30″W	3,750	60.40%	21,486 (2019)	7,921,731 (2019)	Florida Power & Light	Natural gas		

== See also ==
- List of Coal-fired power stations in the United States
- List of Power stations in the United States
- List of largest power stations in the United States
- Natural Gas in the United States
- Natural gas
- Energy in the United States
- Electricity sector of the United States
- List of largest power stations
- List of countries by natural gas production
- List of solar power stations in the United States
