= Nate Monroe =

American newspaper columnist (born 1988)

- Born: 1988 (age 37–38); United States
- Education: Louisiana State University
- Occupation: Journalist
- Years active: 2010–present
- Employer: The Florida Times-Union
- Known for: Investigative reporting on attempted sale of JEA
- Spouse: Erin Kourkounis
- Children: 1
- Awards: Frances DeVore Award for Public Service, Lucy Morgan Award for In-Depth Reporting, Sigma Delta Chi award for column writing

Nate Monroe (born 1988) is an American journalist and executive editor of The Tributary, a nonprofit investigative newsroom based in Jacksonville, Florida. He was previously employed by The Florida Times-Union in Jacksonville, Florida and the USA Today Network, known for his investigative reporting on local government and public utilities and commentary on Florida politics.

== Early life and education ==
Monroe, born in Independence, Missouri, moved to Uptown New Orleans as a child and later grew up in Slidell, a suburb of New Orleans. He attended Louisiana State University, where he graduated in 2010 with a degree in mass communication and media studies.

== Career ==
Monroe's journalism career began in South Louisiana at the Daily Comet in Thibodaux. His time there overlapped with the BP oil spill and its fallout. He then covered local government at the Pensacola News Journal. In 2013, he joined The Florida Times-Union as a beat and investigative reporter covering Jacksonville City Hall and the public utilities. In 2019, he became a metro columnist for the newspaper. His reporting has included coverage of significant local issues and controversies, such as the JEA and Lot J incidents.

In 2022, Monroe was the subject of surveillance by a consulting firm working for Florida Power & Light during the JEA sale attempt. This incident garnered national attention, raising concerns about corporate espionage, journalists' privacy, and media freedom.

Monroe's JEA reporting about the attempted sale of the utility sparked a federal prosecution of JEA executives. Those executives cited Monroe's widespread influence in Jacksonville when asking a court to move their cases outside of the city. Monroe's personal experiences, including the surveillance incident involving his family and pet rat terrier, were reported in various publications.

== Professional Impact and Recognition ==
Monroe's work as a journalist, especially his coverage of Jacksonville's City Hall and various local controversies, has established him as a significant figure in the Jacksonville political sector. His reporting, noted for its depth and impact, has been recognized in local publications such as Folio Weekly. This publication highlighted Monroe's influential columns and the significant role they play in shaping public discourse and understanding of local political issues.

Nate Monroe has been repeatedly recognized as the "Best Local Newspaper Columnist" in Northeast Florida, a title conferred by Folio Weekly. This accolade, most recently awarded in January 2023, acknowledges Monroe's influential role as a metro columnist at The Florida Times-Union.

His investigative work has been recognized with multiple awards, such as the Frances DeVore Award for Public Service, the Lucy Morgan Award for In-Depth Reporting, and a national Sigma Delta Chi award for column writing.

== Personal life ==
Monroe and his wife, a former newspaper journalist, have a son.
