= List of power stations in Florida =

Sources of Florida utility-scale electricity generation in gigawatt-hours, full-year 2025:
1. Natural gas: 195,311 (72.9%)
2. Nuclear: 30,588 (11.4%)
3. Solar: 24,925 (9.31%)
4. Coal: 10,185 (3.80%)
5. Biomass: 3,260 (1.22%)
6. Petroleum: 1,218 (0.45%)
7. Hydroelectric: 165 (0.06%)
8. Other: 2,152 (0.80%)

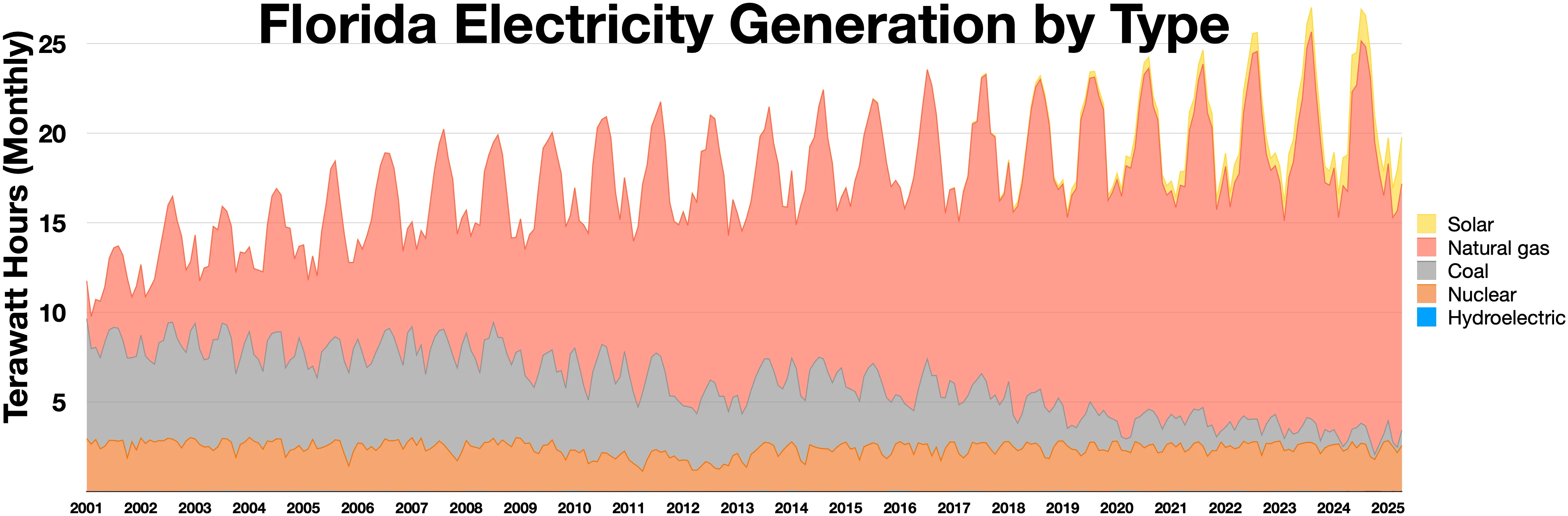
Florida electricity generation by type

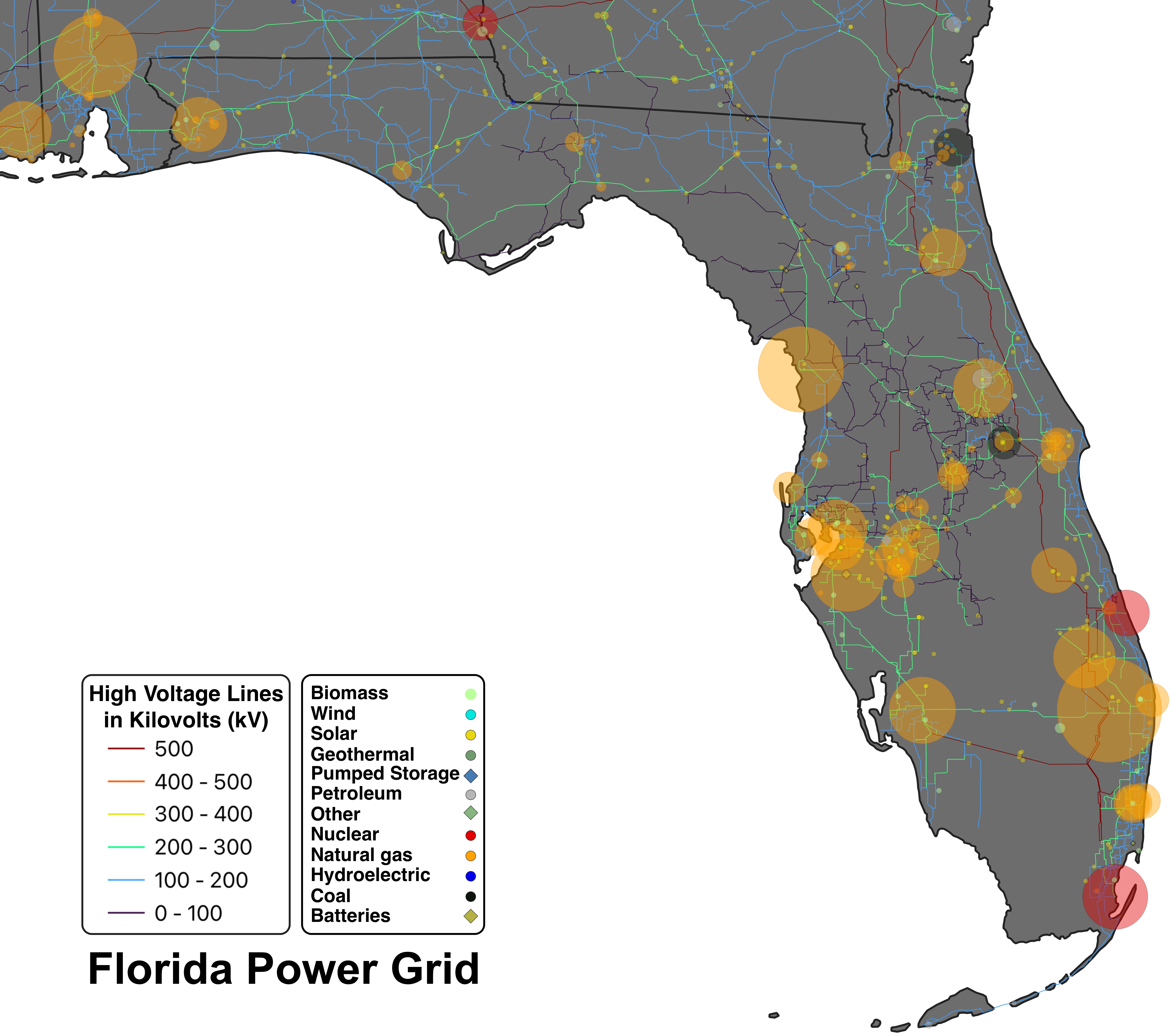
Florida power grid

This is a list of electricity-generating power stations in Florida, sorted by type and name. In 2024, Florida had a total summer capacity of 72.0 GW through all of its power plants, and a net generation of 266,119 GWh.

As of 2024, Florida is the second largest generator of electricity in the nation behind Texas. Major producers include Florida Power & Light, Duke Energy, JEA, and TECO Energy.

In 2020, the average price of electricity in Florida was 10.06 cents per kWh, ranking 21st-highest in the United States. The carbon dioxide produced was 848 lbs per MWh, ranking 24th in the United States. The average price of electricity for residential use was 13.70 cents/kWh in February 2022, compared to 11.92 cents/kWh in February 2021.

The use of coal-fired generation has steadily declined as older equipment has been replaced with cleaner, more efficient natural gas production. The same is true for petroleum. Oil-fired generation fell from 17% in 2002 to 1% in 2022.

The cost of electricity in Florida has been historically lower compared to other states, which made solar investment less attractive, but the number of Photovoltaic power stations have been increasing in recent years as the cost has decreased. The National Renewable Energy Laboratory ranks Florida ninth nationally by strength of resource. The Martin Next Generation Solar Energy Center is the only Concentrated solar power plant in Florida.

Waste-to-energy (WtE) is the process of converting waste material into usable energy, specifically electricity. The Florida Department of Environmental Protection stated that there were eleven WtE facilities in the state as of 2022, all in central or south Florida. Covanta operates a majority of the plants.

The flat terrain in Florida limits the potential use of Hydropower. In fact, the highest point in the state is only 345 feet (105 m) above sea level. As of 2017, there were only two hydroelectric facilities in Florida, and the C. H. Corn Hydroelectric Generating Station was taken out of service in 2022.

Florida had no utility-scale wind generating facilities in 2024 and lawmakers passed legislation to ban offshore turbines. The state has lower wind speeds making it less ideal and the yearly Atlantic hurricane season poses a high risk to wind turbine equipment.

== Active stations ==
Note: Only solar projects larger than 10 MW are listed.

Note: The table of contents only applies when the list is sorted by power station name.

- "Type" denotes PV=photovoltaic; IS=integrated solar; HY=hydroelectric; NG=natural gas; NU=nuclear; PE=petroleum; CO=coal; WA=Waste.
- Left mouse click on the up/down arrows to sort the list.

Name	Type	Location	Capacity (MW)	Area (acres)	Online date	# of panels	Owner	Details	Ref
Anclote	NG	Pasco County	1013	n/a	1974	n/a	Progress	2-unit natural gas steam	
Arvah B. Hopkins	NG	Leon County	484.5	n/a	1971	n/a	City of Tallahassee	2-unit fossil steam; natural gas fired combustion turbine; natural gas fired combined cycle; natural gas internal combustion engine	
Avon Park	NG	Highlands County	24	n/a	1968	n/a	Progress	2-unit combustion turbine	
Babcock Ranch	PV	Charlotte County	75	440	2016/12	343,000	FPL	139 MW planned	
Balm	PV	Hillsborough County	74.5	548	2018/09	736,226	TECO		
Barefoot Bay	PV	Brevard County	74.5	462	2018/03	~330,000	FPL		
Bartow	NG	Franklin County	1133	n/a	2009/06	n/a	Progress	Combined cycle (4 gas, 1 steam turbine) & 4 combustion turbines	
Bayboro	PE	Pinellas County	171	n/a	1973	n/a	Progress Energy	Four combustion turbine units used during times of peak demand	
Big Bend Power Station	NG	Hillsborough County	1600	n/a	1969	n/a	TECO	1-unit NG, 1-unit coal, 2-units retired, 3-unit combustion turbine peaking	
Big Bend Solar	PV	Hillsborough County	20	106	2017/03	202,300	TECO		
Blue Cypress	PV	Indian River County	74.5	432	2018/03	~330,000	FPL		
Bonnie Mine	PV	Polk County	37.5	352		349,439	TECO		
Brandy Branch Generating Station	NG	Duval County	710	n/a		n/a	FPL	170 MW simple-cycle natural gas combustion turbine, 2-on-1 combined cycle unit consisting of two 170 MW natural gas combustion turbines and 200 MW steam turbine-electric generator	
C.D. McIntosh Power Plant	NG	Polk County	360	n/a		n/a	FPL	Combined cycle natural gas	
C. D. Macintosh Jr.	PE	Polk County	5	n/a	1978/12	n/a	Lakeland Electric	Fossil fuel-fired boiler and electric turbine-steam generator (Unit 3); a natural gas-fired combined cycle unit (Unit 5)	
Cape Canaveral	NG	Brevard County	1290	n/a		n/a	FPL	Unit 1 (3X1 combined cycle) gas/oil	
Citrus Combined Cycle Plant	NG	Citrus County	1640	n/a		n/a	FPL	820 MW natural gas combined-cycle turbines (2 units)	
Citrus Ridge Solar	PV	Orange County	52	270	2018	500,000	Walt Disney World	Built by Origis Energy for Walt Disney World/Reedy Creek Improvement District, generates enough power for two of the four theme parks at Walt Disney World	
Citrus Solar	PV	DeSoto County	74.5	841	2016/12		FPL		
Coral Farms	PV	Putnam County	74.5	587	2018/01	~330,000	FPL		
Crystal River Energy Complex	NG	Citrus County	1610	n/a	1982	n/a	Progress	700 MW fossil-fuel fired generators (2 units)	
Crystal River Nuclear Plant	NU	Citrus County	860	n/a	1978	n/a	Duke Energy	700 MW fossil-fuel fired generators (2 units)	
DeBary	NG	Volusia County	237	n/a		n/a	Progress	10-unit combustion turbine	
DeBary Plant	PE	Volusia County	322	n/a	1975	n/a	Progress Energy	10 combustion turbine units used primarily during times of peak demand	
Debary Solar Power Plant	PV	Volusia County	74.5	445	2020/05	300,000	Duke Energy		
Deerhaven Generating Station	NG	Alachua County	185	n/a	1972	n/a	Gainesville Regional Utilities	Simple-cycle combustion turbine	
DeSoto Next Generation Solar Energy Center	PV	DeSoto County	25	235	2009/10	90,000	FPL	300 planned	
Echo River Solar	PV	Suwannee County	74.5	~500		~330,000	FPL		
Field Street	PE	Volusia County	44	n/a	2001	n/a	New Smyrna Beach Utilities Commission		
Fort Drum Solar Energy Center	PV	Okeechobee County	74.5	840	2021/06	309,120	FPL		
Fort Myers Generating	NG	Lee County	2378	n/a		n/a	FPL	Combined cycle (6 x 2) 2 peaking units: 2 gas/oil	
Fort Myers Power Plant	PE	Lee County	108	n/a	2003/06	n/a	FPL		
George E. Turner Power Plant	NG	Volusia County	147	n/a	1970	n/a	Progress Energy	Combustion turbine	
Grange Hall	PV	Hillsborough County	61.1	447		595,213	TECO		
Gulf Clean Energy Center	NG	Escambia County	1047	n/a		n/a	FPL	Natural gas fired combustion turbine; NG gas steam turbine. Formerly Crist.	
Gulf Coast Solar Center I	PV	Valparaiso	30	240	2017	371,325	Gulf Power		
Gulf Coast Solar Center II	PV	Navarre	40	336	2017	472,800	Gulf Power		
Gulf Coast Solar Center III	PV	Bellview	50	366	2017	599,775	Gulf Power		
H.L. Culbreath Bay Side	NG	Hillsborough County	1854	n/a	1999	n/a	FPL	Natural gas	
Hamilton	PV	Jasper, Florida	74.9		2018/12		Duke		
Hammock	PV	Hendry County	74.5	957	2018/03	~330,000	FPL		
Hardee Power Station	NG	Pinellas County	471	n/a		n/a	FPL	2-on-1 combined cycle unit	
Higgins	NG	Pinellas County	114	n/a	1969	n/a	Progress	4-unit combustion turbine	
Hillsborough County SW Energy Recovery Facility	WA	Hillsborough County	47	n/a	1984/12	n/a	Hillsborough County		
Hines Energy Complex	NG	Polk County	2054	n/a	1999	n/a	Progress	4-unit combined cycle	
Horizon Solar Energy Center	PV	Putnam County	74.5	684	2018/01	~330,000	NextEra Energy		
Indian River Power Plant	NG	Brevard County	290	n/a		n/a	FPL	Converted to natural gas, waiting state approval to operate in 2015	
Indian River Solar	PV	Indian River County	74.5	695	2018/01	~330,000	FPL		
Intercession City	NG	Osceola County	534	n/a	1974	n/a	Progress Energy	14-unit combustion turbine	
Intercession City	PE	Osceola County	417	n/a	1993/10	n/a	Duke Energy		
Interstate Solar	PV	St. Lucie County	74.5	543		~330,000	FPL		
J.D. Kennedy Generating Station	NG	Duval County	357.2	n/a	2000/06	n/a	JEA	1-unit oil/gas combustion turbine, 3 peaking units	
Jacksonville Solar	PV	Duval County	15	100	2010	200,000	PSEG Solar Source LLC		
Jim Woodruff Dam	HY	Gadsden County	43.5	n/a	1957	n/a	USACE-Mobile	Net summer	
Lake County Resource Recovery Facility	WA	Lake County	14.5	n/a	1991/03	n/a	Covanta Lake II		
Lake Hancock	PV	Polk County	49.6	356		467,820	TECO		
Lansing Smith Electric Generating Plant	NG	Bay County	543	n/a		n/a	FPL	2-on-1 natural gas combined-cycle (1 unit)	
Larsen Memorial	NG	Polk County	124	n/a		n/a	FPL	Natural gas, diesel backup	
Lansing Smith Electric Generating Plant	PE	Bay County	32	n/a	2002/04	n/a	Florida Power & Light		
Lauderdale Power Station	NG	Broward County	1223.6	n/a		n/a	FPL	2 (2x1 combined cycle) with 2 units gas/oil	
Lee County Waste-to-Energy Facility	WA	Lee County	57.4	n/a	2001	n/a	Reworld	Two 600 ton-per-day (TPD) waterwall furnaces and one 636 TPD with Martin® reverse-reciprocating grates and ash handling system	
Lithia	PV	Hillsborough County	74.5	580		742,194	TECO		
Loggerhead	PV	St. Lucie County	74.5	565	2018/03	~330,000	FPL		
Manatee Power Plant	NG	Hillsborough County	1224	n/a		n/a	FPL	4-on-1 combined-cycle consisting of four 170 MW combustion turbines with 470 MW steam turbine-electric generator	
Manatee Combined Cycle Power Plant	PE	Manatee County	1618	n/a	2005/06	n/a	FPL		
Manatee Solar	PV	Manatee County	74.5	762	2016/12	338,000	FPL		
Marathon Generating Plant	PE	Monroe County	11	n/a		n/a	Marathon Petroleum		
Martin Next Generation Solar Energy Center	IS	Martin County	75	500	2010/12	6,864	FPL	(192,192 mirrors)	
Martin Power Plant	NG	Martin County	2209	n/a		n/a	FPL	500 MW 2-on-1 combined-cycle generators (2 units), 1100 MW 4-on-1 combined-cycle generator	
McKay Bay Refuse-to-Energy Project	WA	Hillsboro County	22.5	n/a	1985	n/a	City of Tampa		
Miami-Dade County Resource Recovery	WA	Miami-Dade County	77	n/a	1978/01	n/a	Miami-Dade County		
Miami-Dade County Solar	PV	Miami-Dade County	74.5	465		~330,000	FPL		
Midulla Power Station	NG	Hardee County	853	n/a		n/a	FPL	2-on-1 combined cycle unit	
North Broward County Resource Recovery	WA	Broward County	68	n/a	1987/03	n/a	Waste Innovations		
Northern Preserve Solar	PV	Baker County	74.5	565	2020	301,948	FPL		
Northside Generating Station	NG	Duval County	524	n/a		n/a	FPL	3-unit steam, 4-unit diesel peaking	
Northside Generating Station	PE	Duval County	212	n/a		n/a	JEA	Unit ST3	
Osprey Energy Center	NG	Polk County	583	n/a		n/a	FPL	1-unit: combined-cycle	
P. L. Bartow Combined Cycle Power Plant	PE	Pinellas County	82	n/a	2009/06	n/a	Duke Energy		
Palm Beach Renewable Energy Facility No. 1	WA	Palm Beach County	62	n/a	1989	n/a	Solid Waste Authority of Palm Beach County		
Palm Beach Renewable Energy Facility No. 2	WA	Palm Beach County	95	n/a	2015/07	n/a	Solid Waste Authority of Palm Beach County		
Pasco County Solid Waste Resource Recovery	WA	Pasco County	49	n/a	1988/08	n/a	Pasco County		
Payne Creek Generating Station	NG	Hardee County	350	n/a		n/a	FPL	Gas-fired combined cycle	
Payne Creek Solar	PV	Polk County	70.3	503		711,012	TECO		
Pea Ridge	NG	Santa Rosa County	12	n/a		n/a	FPL	5 MW natural-gas generators (3 units)	
Peace Creek	PV	Polk County	55.4	422		467,820	TECO		
Pinellas County Resource Recovery Facility	WA	Pinellas County	75	n/a	1979/07	n/a	Pinellas County		
Pioneer Trail	PV	Volusia County	74.5	1,219	2019	~330,000	FPL		
Polk Power Plant	NG	Polk County	1281	n/a		n/a	FPL	Unit 1 integrated coal gasification combined-cycle, units 2&3 gas/oil combustion turbine, units 4&5 natural gas	
Polk Power Plant	PE	Polk County	59	n/a	1994	n/a	TECO		
Port Everglades	NG	Broward County	1237	n/a		n/a	FPL	12 unit gas/oil - repowered to 1 3x1 gas/oil unit	
Rice Creek Solar Energy Center	PV	Putnam County	75	615	2025	213,000	Florida Municipal Power Agency	Built by Origis Energy	
Rio Pinar	NG	Orange County	12	n/a	1970	n/a	Progress Energy	Oil-fired peaker 1-unit combustion turbine	
Riviera	NG	Palm Beach County	1290	n/a		n/a	FPL	1 unit gas/oil (3x1 combined cycle)	
S. O. Purdom	NG	Volusia County	226	n/a		n/a	FPL	Natural gas fired combined cycle	
Sanford	NG	Volusia County	2352	n/a		n/a	FPL	2 4x1 units gas	
Seminole Generating Station	CO	Putnam County	714	2000	1984	n/a	Seminole Electric Cooperative	1-unit coal-fired steam	
Santa Rosa Energy Center	NG	Santa Rosa County	235.9	n/a		n/a	FPL	1-unit: combined-cycle	
South Broward County Resource Recovery	WA	Broward County	66	n/a	1986/06	n/a	Waste Innovations		
Space Coast Next Generation Solar Energy Center	PV	Brevard County (Kennedy Space Center)	10	60	2010/04	35,000	FPL; NASA		
St. Lucie Nuclear Power Plant	NU	St. Lucie County	1968	n/a	1976/12	n/a	FPL	2 × C-E 2-loop nuclear PWR	
Standby Generation Plant	NG	Santa Rosa County	14	n/a		n/a	FPL	Natural gas internal combustion engine	
Stanton Energy Center	NG	Orange County	295	n/a		n/a	FPL	Unit A&B combined cycle, units 1&2 coal, 6 MW solar farm	
Stock Island Power Plant	PE	Monroe County	114.5	n/a		n/a	Keys Energy Services	four combustion turbine, two medium speed diesel and one high speed diesel	
Sub 12	NG	Leon County	18.6	n/a		n/a	FPL	Natural gas internal combustion engine	
Sunshine Gateway	PV	Columbia County	74.5	953	2019/01	~330,000	FPL		
Suwannee River	NG	Suwannee County	99	n/a	1953	n/a	Progress Energy	3-unit combustion turbine	
Suwannee Solar Facility	PV	Suwannee County	8.8	70	2017/12	<44,000	Duke Energy Florida		
Tallahassee Solar Farm 1	PV	Leon County	20	120	2018/01	~200,000	City of Tallahassee		
Tallahassee Solar Farm 2	PV	Leon County	42	240	2020/02	~400,000	City of Tallahassee		
Tiger Bay Cogeneration Facility	NG	Polk County	200	n/a	1999	n/a	Progress Energy	Combustion turbine, heat recovery steam turbine generator, and steam generation boiler	
Tom G. Smith Power Plant	NG	Palm Beach County	57.5	n/a		n/a	FPL	30 MW combined-cycle generator	
Tom G. Smith Power Plant	PE	Palm Beach County	36	n/a	1976	n/a	City of Lake Worth Utilities	30 MW combined cycle unit (Unit S-5), a 30 MW simple cycle gas turbine, a 26 MW fossil fuel steam generating unit (Unit S-3)	
Treasure Coast Energy Center	NG	St. Lucie County	318	n/a		n/a	FPL	1-unit natural gas	
Turkey Point Gas-fired Plant	NG	Miami-Dade County	1253	n/a		n/a	FPL	1 combined-cycle gas-fired turbine	
Turkey Point Nuclear Plant	NU	Miami-Dade County	1658	n/a		n/a	FPL	2 × Westinghouse 3-loop nuclear PWR	
University of Florida	NG	Alachua County	42.5	n/a	1994	n/a	Progress Energy	1-unit combustion turbine	
Vero Beach	NG	Indian River County	117	n/a		n/a	FPL		
West County Energy Center	NG	Palm Beach County	3756	n/a		n/a	FPL	1250 MW 3-on-1 natural gas-fired combined cycle turbines (3 units)	
Whistling Duck Solar	PV	Levy County	74		2025		Florida Municipal Power Agency	Built by Origis Energy	
Wildflower	PV	DeSoto County	74.5	721	2018/01	~330,000	FPL		
Winston Power Station	PE	Polk County	50	n/a	2001	n/a	City of Lakeland	Fuel oil	

== Decommissioned stations and units ==
Name	City	Nameplate capacity (MW)	Owner	Details	Ref
C. H. Corn Hydroelectric Generating Station	Lake Talquin	12	State of Florida		
Crystal River Nuclear Plant	Crystal River	1855	Duke Energy	Coal (2 units), Babcock & Wilcox nuclear PWR (1 unit)	
Indiantown Cogeneration LP	Indiantown	330	Florida Power & Light		
J.H. Phillips Power Station	Highlands County	36	TECO	2 residual or distillate oil-fired diesel engines, placed into long-term reserve standby in September 2009, demolished June 2019	
St. Johns River Power Park	Jacksonville	1264	FPL, JEA	Coal/petroleum coke (whole plant; 2 units) demolished June 2018	
Suwannee River Power Plant	Suwannee County	50	Duke Energy	3-unit oil-fired steam started 1953; retired in December 2016	
Turkey Point Nuclear Generating Station	Homestead	808	Florida Power & Light	Foster-Wheeler gas/oil turbines (2 units)	

== See also ==
- List of power stations in the United States
- Solar power in Florida
