= Solar power in Florida =

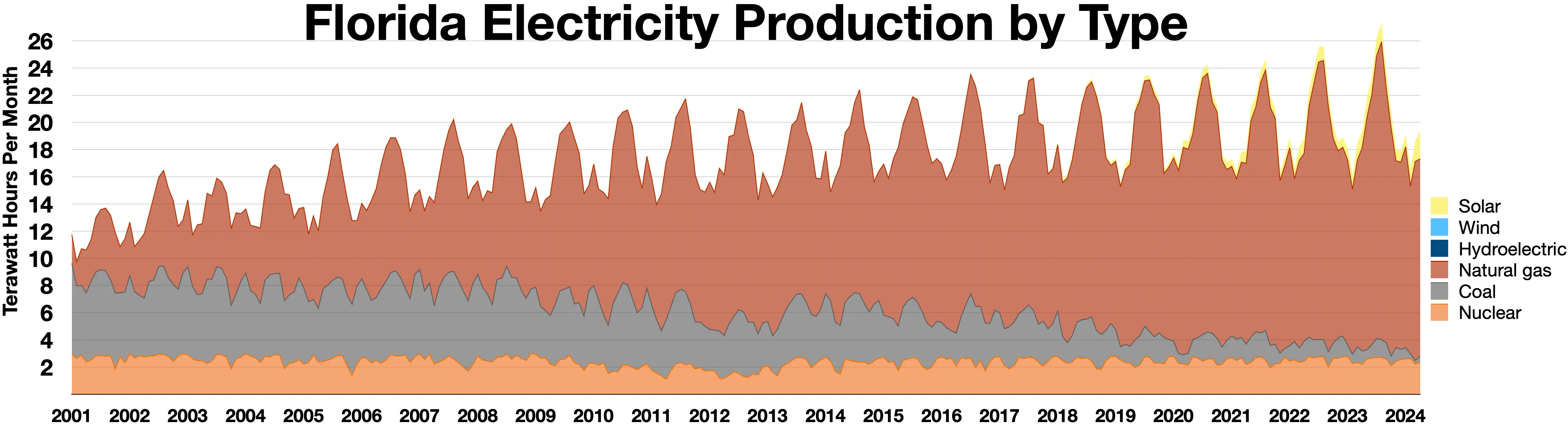
Florida electricity production by type

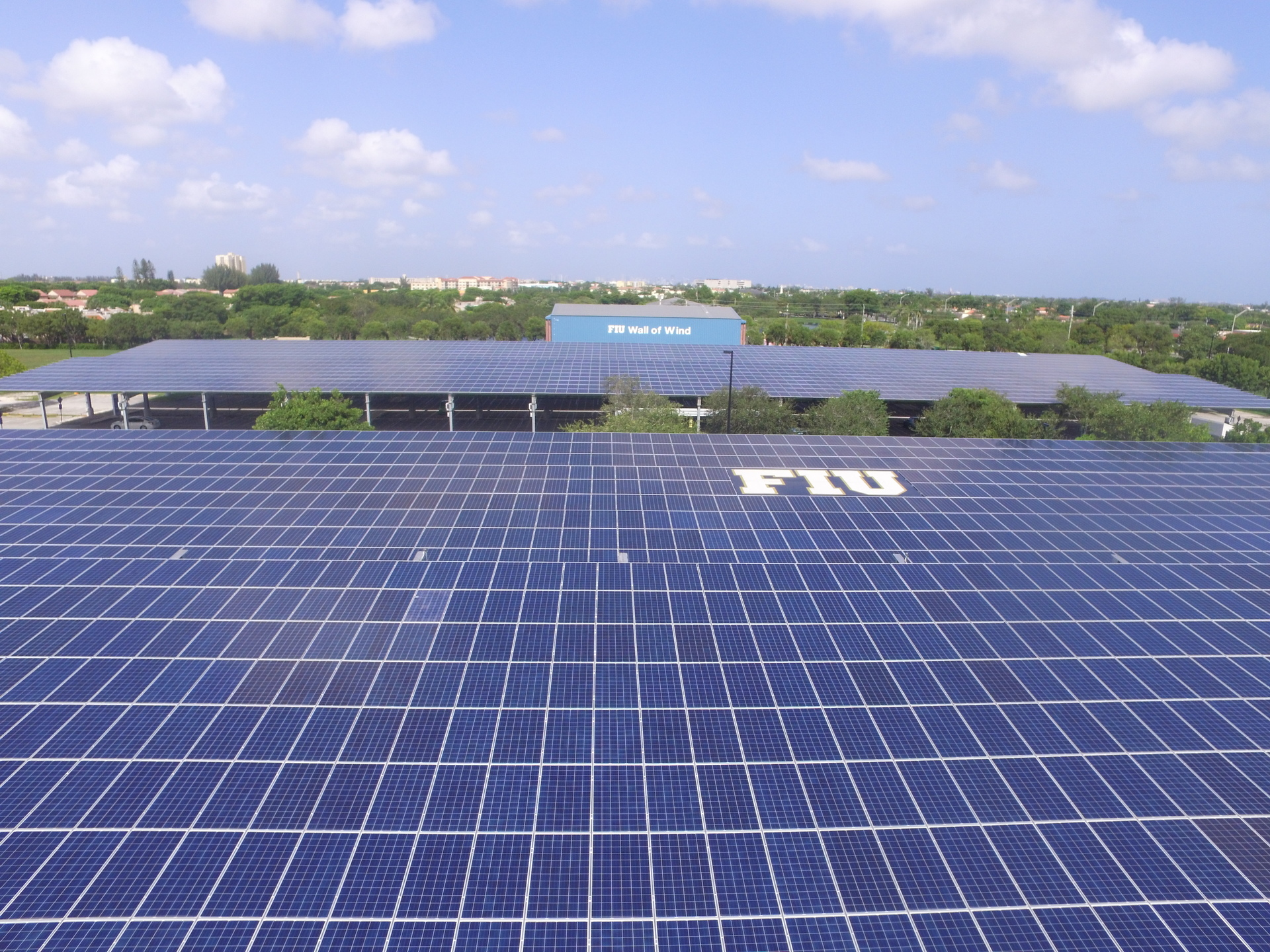
Solar panels on parking lot roof, Miami

Solar power in Florida has been increasing, as the cost of solar power systems using photovoltaics (PV) has decreased in recent years. Florida has low electricity costs compared with other states, which makes individual solar investment less attractive.

Florida ranks ninth nationally in solar resource strength, according to the National Renewable Energy Laboratory and tenth in solar generation, according to the Solar Energy Industries Association.

== Government support ==
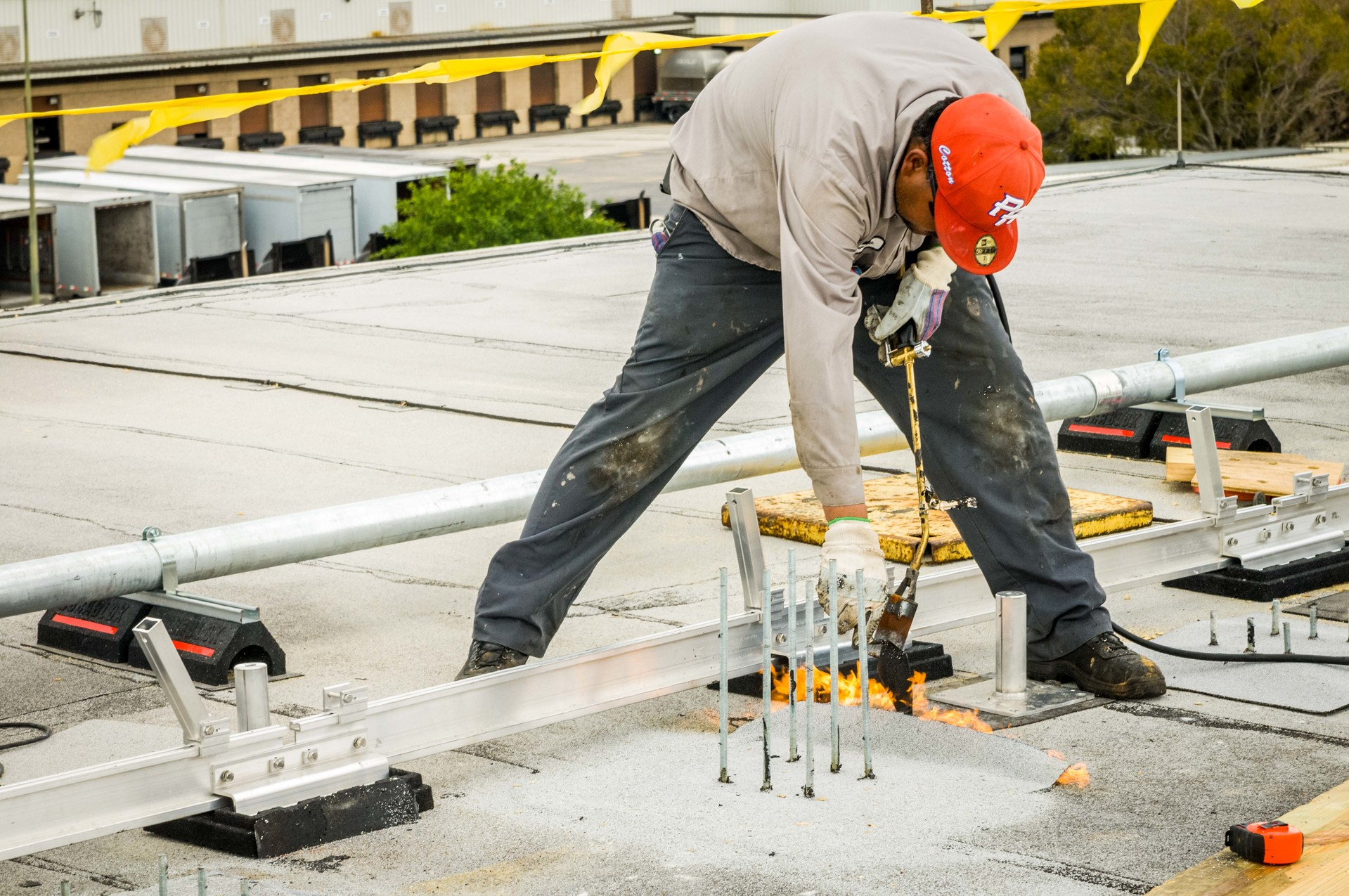
Solar panel installation, Broward County

In 2006, the State of Florida enacted the Florida Renewable Energy Technologies and Energy Efficiency Act, which provided consumers with rebates and tax credits for solar photovoltaic systems. The program was closed in 2010. Later, the Florida Public Service Commission mandated that the state's large utilities offer individual solar rebates. The program opened in 2011 and was closed in 2015 after the Commission deemed it to not be cost-effective for non-solar customers.

In 2008, Florida adopted a net metering rule that allows any electric utility customer generating up to 2 MW (2,000 kW) of power to use net metering, which provides a retail rate credit for kilowatt-hours of electricity delivered to the utility, rolled over from month to month, and paid out in cash by the utility once a year at the avoided cost rate.

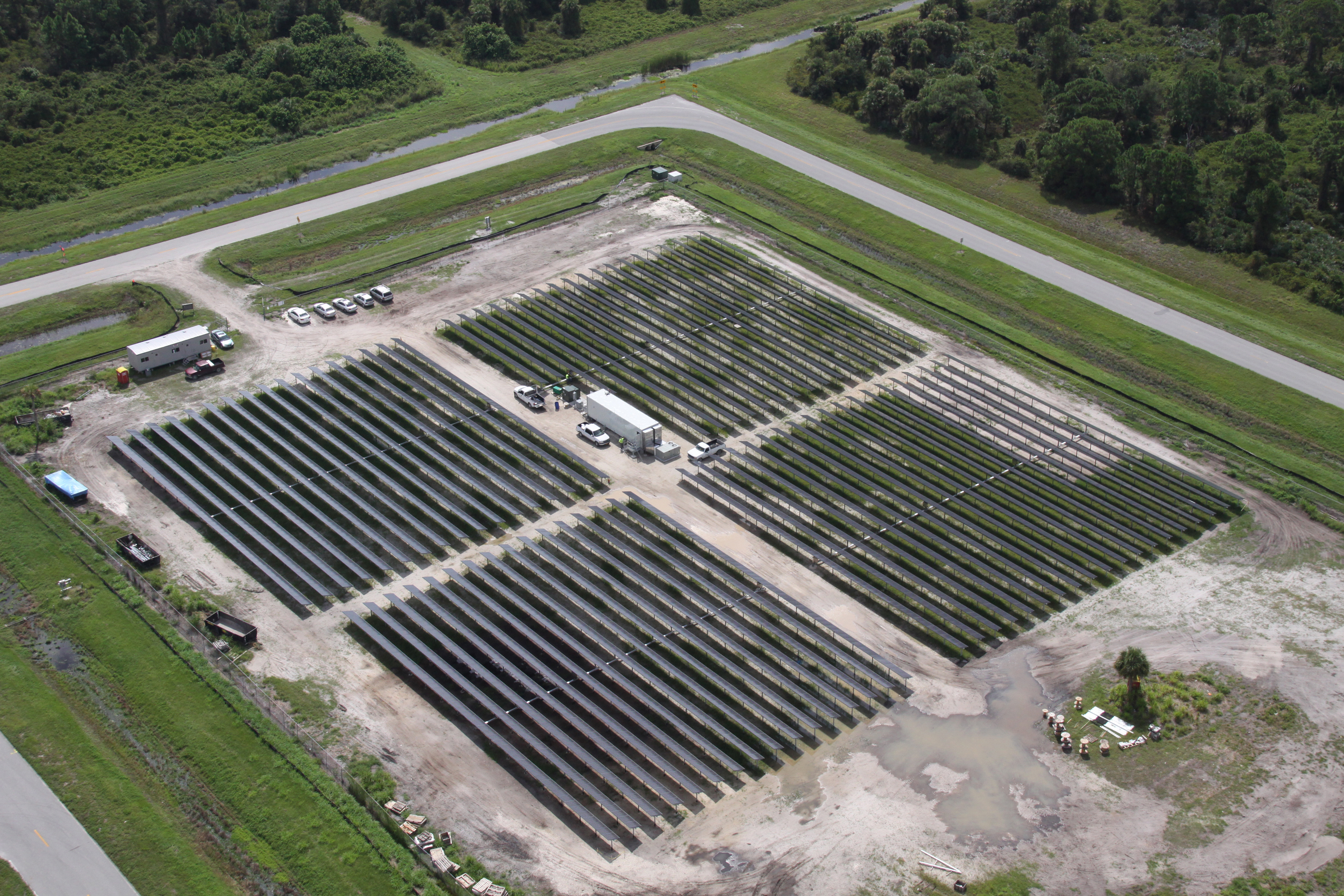
Solar farm at Kennedy Space Center

The federal Residential Energy Efficient Property Credit (income tax credit on IRS Form 5695) for residential PV and solar thermal was extended in December 2015 to remain at 30% of system cost (parts and installation) for systems put into service by the end of 2019, then 26% until the end of 2020, and then 22% until the end of 2021. It applies to a taxpayer's principal and/or second residences, but not to a property that is rented out. There is no maximum cap on the credit, the credit can be applied toward the Alternative Minimum Tax, and any excess credit (greater than that year's tax liability) can be rolled into the following year. Florida's solar capacity has expanded significantly in recent years, surpassing 12 gigawatts (GW) of installed solar capacity in 2024. Much of this expansion is attributed to falling installation costs and the increased adoption of large solar farms across the state.

== Large-scale facilities ==
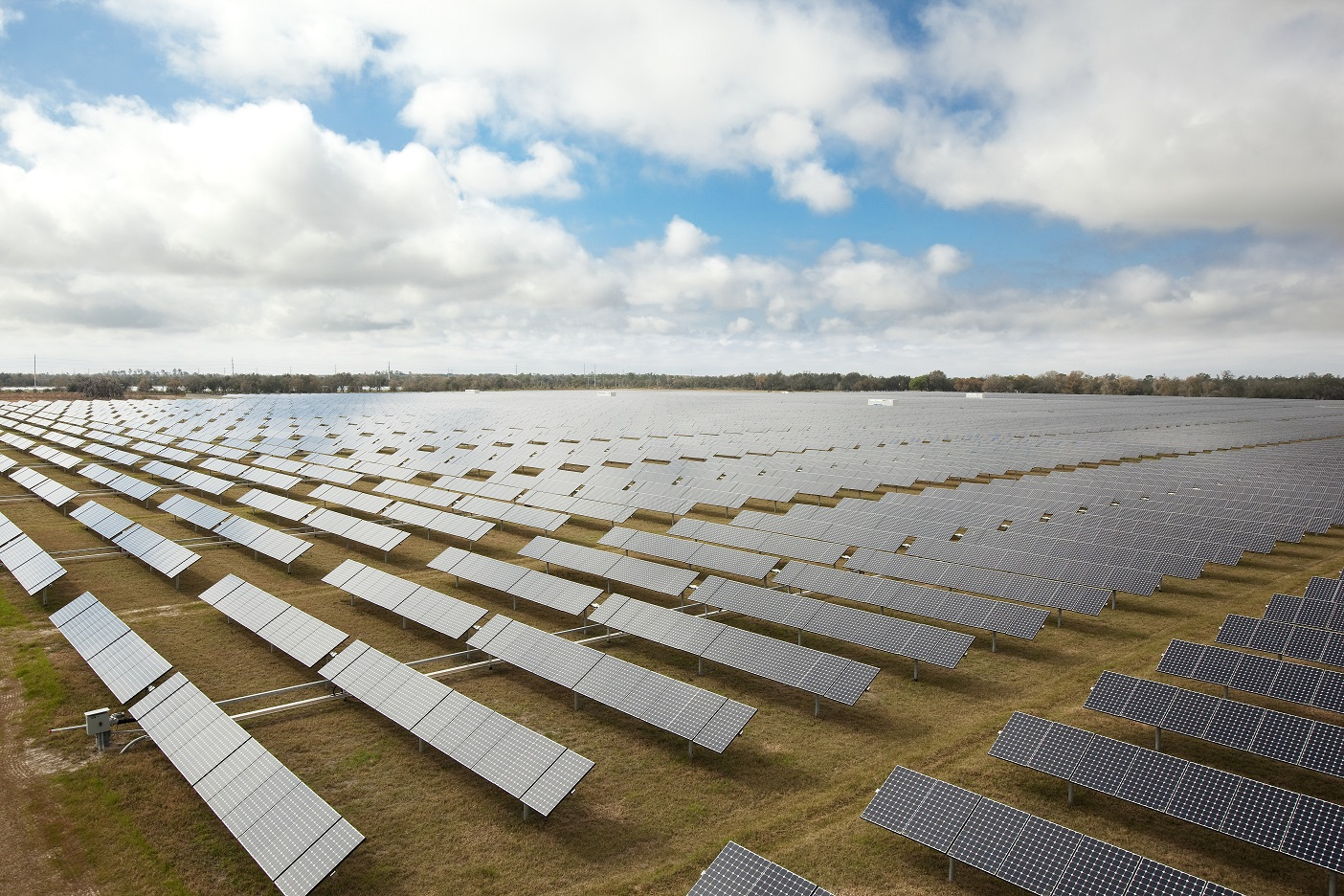
Desoto Solar Plant

=== Currently operating (Note: As of December 31, 2025) ===
==== Central East Florida region ====
Solar Facilities in Florida (Central East Florida Region)
#	Plant Name	Utility Name	County	Capacity (MW)	Operating Year
1	Barefoot Bay Solar Energy Center	Florida Power & Light Co	Brevard	74.5	2018
2	Blue Cypress Solar Energy Center	Florida Power & Light Co	Indian River	74.5	2018
3	Bluefield Preserve Solar	Florida Power & Light Co	St Lucie	74.5	2023
4	Buttonwood	Florida Power & Light Co	St Lucie	74.5	2024
5	Daytona International Speedway Solar	Florida Power & Light Co	Volusia	1.6	2016
6	Debary Solar Power Plant	Duke Energy Florida, LLC	Volusia	74.5	2020
7	Discovery Solar Center	Florida Power & Light Co	Brevard	74.5	2021
8	Fawn	Florida Power & Light Co	Martin	74.5	2025
9	Fox Trail	Florida Power & Light Co	Brevard	74.5	2025
10	Grove	Florida Power & Light Co	Indian River	74.5	2022
11	Ibis	Florida Power & Light Co	Brevard	74.5	2024
12	Indian River Solar Center	Florida Power & Light Co	Indian River	74.5	2018
13	Interstate Solar Energy Center	Florida Power & Light Co	St Lucie	74.5	2019
14	Loggerhead Solar Energy Center	Florida Power & Light Co	St Lucie	74.5	2018
15	Monarch	Florida Power & Light Co	Martin	74.5	2024
16	Orange Blossom Solar Center	Florida Power & Light Co	Indian River	74.5	2021
17	Orchard	Florida Power & Light Co	St Lucie	74.5	2024
18	Palm Bay Solar	Florida Power & Light Co	Brevard	74.5	2021
19	Pelican Solar Center	Florida Power & Light Co	St Lucie	74.5	2021
20	Pineapple	Florida Power & Light Co	St Lucie	74.5	2024
21	Pink Trial Solar Energy Center	Florida Power & Light Co	St Lucie	74.5	2023
22	Pioneer Trail Solar Energy Center	Florida Power & Light Co	Volusia	74.5	2019
23	Space Coast Next Gen Solar Energy	Florida Power & Light Co	Brevard	10.0	2010
24	Sundew	Florida Power & Light Co	St Lucie	74.5	2022
25	Sweetbay Solar Center	Florida Power & Light Co	Martin	74.5	2020
26	Turnpike	Florida Power & Light Co	Indian River	74.5	2024
27	White Tail	Florida Power & Light Co	Martin	74.5	2024

==== Central Florida Region ====
Solar Facilities in Florida (Central Florida Region)
#	Plant Name	Utility Name	County	Capacity (MW)	Operating Year
1	ACE-Stanton A PV	ACE-Stanton A, LLC	Orange	4.1	2017
2	ACE-Stanton PV	ACE-Stanton, LLC	Orange	4.8	2017
3	Alafia Solar	Tampa Electric Co	Polk	60.0	2023
4	Altamonte Mall	Altamonte Mall	Seminole	1.5	2016
5	Bartow Solar Energy LLC	Cardinal Renewables	Polk	7.3	2018
6	Big Water	Florida Power & Light Co	Okeechobee	74.5	2025
7	Bonnie Mine Solar	Tampa Electric Co	Polk	37.5	2019
8	Charlie Creek Solar Power Plant	Duke Energy Florida, LLC	Hardee	74.9	2022
9	Citrus Ridge Solar	FL Solar 5, LLC	Orange	52.0	2018
10	Durrance	Tampa Electric Co	Polk	60.0	2021
11	FPL Cavendish Solar Energy Center	Florida Power & Light Co	Okeechobee	74.5	2023
12	Fort Drum Energy Center	Florida Power & Light Co	Okeechobee	74.5	2021
13	Fort Green Solar Power Plant	Duke Energy Florida, LLC	Hardee	74.9	2022
14	Goldfinch	Goldfinch (Lakeland)	Polk	3.0	2016
15	Half Moon Solar Plant	Duke Energy Florida, LLC	Sumter	74.9	2025
16	Harmony Florida Solar II	Harmony Florida Solar II, LLC	Osceola	74.5	2024
17	Harmony Solar (FL)	Harmony Florida Solar LLC	Osceola	74.5	2020
18	Honeybell	Florida Power & Light Co	Okeechobee	74.5	2024
19	Jamison Solar (FL)	Tampa Electric Co	Polk	74.5	2022
20	LKL BLBD, LLC	LKL BLBD, LLC	Polk	6.0	2015
21	Lake Hancock Solar	Tampa Electric Co	Polk	49.5	2019
22	Lake Mabel Solar and Battery Storage	Tampa Electric Co	Polk	74.5	2023
23	Lake Placid Solar Power Plant	Duke Energy Florida, LLC	Highlands	45.0	2019
24	Lakeland Electric Co. (FL) - Airport II	Sun E N7 Holdings LLC	Polk	3.5	2012
25	Lakeland Electric Co. (FL)-Airport 1	SunE W12DG-B, LLC	Polk	2.3	2011
26	Lakeside Solar Center	Florida Power & Light Co	Okeechobee	74.5	2020
27	Legoland Solar	Tampa Electric Co	Polk	1.4	2016
28	Lockheed Martin Solar	Lockheed Martin RMS	Orange	1.9	2017
29	Magnolia Solar	Tampa Electric Co	Polk	74.5	2021
30	Mount Dora Solar Farm F	Green Street Power Partners	Lake	2.1	2023
31	Mount Dora Solar Farm W	Green Street Power Partners	Lake	1.9	2023
32	Okeechobee Solar	Florida Power & Light Co	Okeechobee	74.5	2020
33	Osceola Solar Facility	Duke Energy Florida, LLC	Osceola	3.8	2016
34	Payne Creek Solar	Tampa Electric Co	Polk	70.3	2018
35	Peace Creek Solar	Tampa Electric Co	Polk	55.4	2019
36	RP-Orlando, LLC	Deriva Energy	Orange	5.1	2011
37	Speckled Perch	Florida Power & Light Co	Okeechobee	74.5	2025
38	Storey Bend Solar	Storey Bend Solar, LLC	Osceola	74.5	2024
39	Taylor Creek Solar	Taylor Creek Solar LLC	Orange	74.5	2020
40	Walt Disney World Solar Facility	Duke Energy Florida Solar Solutions	Orange	4.9	2016

==== Central West Florida region ====
Solar Facilities in Florida (Central West Florida Region)
#	Plant Name	Utility Name	County	Capacity (MW)	Operating Year
1	Balm Solar	Tampa Electric Co	Hillsborough	74.4	2018
2	Big Bend 1 Solar and Battery Storage	Tampa Electric Co	Hillsborough	19.8	2017
3	Big Bend Agrivoltaics	Tampa Electric Co	Hillsborough	1.0	2022
4	Big Bend Floating Solar I	Tampa Electric Co	Hillsborough	1.0	2022
5	Big Bend II Solar	Tampa Electric Co	Hillsborough	45.8	2022
6	Bullfrog Creek Solar	Tampa Electric Co	Hillsborough	74.5	2024
7	Cottonmouth Ranch Solar	Tampa Electric Co	Hillsborough	74.5	2025
8	Dover Solar and Battery Storage	Tampa Electric Co	Hillsborough	25.0	2023
9	Duette Solar Power Plant	Duke Energy Florida, LLC	Manatee	74.5	2021
10	Elder Branch	Florida Power & Light Co	Manatee	74.5	2022
11	English Creek Solar	Tampa Electric Co	Hillsborough	23.0	2024
12	Grange Hall Solar	Tampa Electric Co	Hillsborough	61.1	2019
13	IKEA Tampa 042	IKEA Property Inc	Hillsborough	1.0	2012
14	John Hopkins Middle School Microgrid	Duke Energy Florida, LLC	Pinellas	0.8	2023
15	Juniper Solar (FL)	Tampa Electric Co	Pasco	70.0	2023
16	Laurel Oaks Solar	Tampa Electric Co	Hillsborough	61.2	2022
17	Lithia Solar	Tampa Electric Co	Hillsborough	74.5	2019
18	Little Manatee River Solar	Tampa Electric Co	Hillsborough	74.5	2020
19	Lockheed Martin Solar System	Lockheed Martin Solar System	Pinellas	1.9	2015
20	Long Creek	Florida Power & Light Co	Manatee	74.5	2025
21	Manatee Solar Energy Center	Florida Power & Light Co	Manatee	74.5	2016
22	Mountain View Solar (FL)	Tampa Electric Co	Pasco	54.6	2022
23	Rattler Solar Plant	Duke Energy Florida, LLC	Hernando	74.9	2025
24	Riverside Solar	Tampa Electric Co	Hillsborough	55.2	2022
25	Sambucus	Florida Power & Light Co	Manatee	74.5	2024
26	Southfork Solar	Florida Power & Light Co	Manatee	74.5	2020
27	TIA Solar	Tampa Electric Co	Hillsborough	1.6	2015
28	Three Creeks	Florida Power & Light Co	Manatee	74.5	2024
29	Willow Solar Energy Center	Florida Power & Light Co	Manatee	74.5	2021
30	Wimauma Solar and Battery Storage	Tampa Electric Co	Hillsborough	74.8	2020

==== North Central Florida region ====
Solar Facilities in Florida (North Central Florida Region)
#	Plant Name	Utility Name	County	Capacity (MW)	Operating Year
1	Bay Trail Solar Power Plant	Duke Energy Florida, LLC	Citrus	74.9	2022
2	Bell Ridge Solar	Bell Ridge Solar, LLC	Gilchrist	74.5	2023
3	Bronson Solar	Bronson Solar LLC	Levy	74.5	2025
4	Butler Plaza	Clean Focus Yield, LLC	Alachua	1.2	2010
5	Columbia County Solar	FRP Columbia County Solar, LLC	Columbia	74.5	2024
6	Columbia Solar Power Plant	Duke Energy Florida, LLC	Columbia	74.9	2020
7	County Line Renewable Energy Center	Duke Energy Florida, LLC	Gilchrist	74.9	2024
8	Echo River Solar	Florida Power & Light Co	Suwannee	74.5	2020
9	Falmouth Renewable Energy Center	Duke Energy Florida, LLC	Suwannee	74.9	2024
10	Gilchrist County Solar	FRP Gilchrist County Solar, LLC	Alachua	74.5	2024
11	Hamilton Solar Power Plant	Duke Energy Florida, LLC	Hamilton	74.9	2018
12	Hardeetown Solar Power Plant	Duke Energy Florida, LLC	Levy	74.9	2023
13	High Springs Solar Power Plant	Duke Energy Florida, LLC	Alachua	74.9	2023
14	Hildreth Solar Power Plant	Duke Energy Florida, LLC	Suwannee	74.9	2023
15	MLH 2	CleanCapital Holdings	Alachua	1.0	2013
16	MLH 3	CleanCapital Holdings	Alachua	1.0	2013
17	Norton Creek	Florida Power & Light Co	Madison	74.5	2024
18	Perry Solar Facility	Duke Energy Florida, LLC	Taylor	5.1	2016
19	Santa Fe Solar Power Plant	Duke Energy Florida, LLC	Columbia	74.9	2021
20	Solar Park Gainesville, LLC	Altus Power America Management, LLC	Alachua	1.6	2011
21	Sundance Renewable Energy Center	Duke Energy Florida, LLC	Madison	74.9	2025
22	Sunshine Gateway Solar Energy Center	Florida Power & Light Co	Columbia	74.5	2019
23	Suwannee Solar Facility	Duke Energy Florida, LLC	Suwannee	8.8	2017
24	Trenton Solar Power Plant	Duke Energy Florida, LLC	Gilchrist	74.9	2019
25	Twin Rivers Solar Power Plant	Duke Energy Florida, LLC	Hamilton	74.9	2021
26	Union Springs Solar Center	Florida Power & Light Co	Union	74.5	2020
27	Whistling Duck I	Origis Energy USA, Inc	Levy	75.0	2025
28	Winquepin Renewable Energy Center	Duke Energy Florida, LLC	Madison	74.9	2024

==== Northeast Florida region ====
Solar Facilities in Florida (Northeast Florida Region)
#	Plant Name	Utility Name	County	Capacity (MW)	Operating Year
1	AEP Jacksonville Solar Project	Onsite Partners, LLC	Duval	7.1	2017
2	Anhinga Solar Energy Center	Florida Power & Light Co	Clay	74.5	2023
3	Cedar Trail	Florida Power & Light Co	Baker	74.5	2024
4	Coral Farms Solar Energy Center	Florida Power & Light Co	Putnam	74.5	2018
5	Egret Solar Center	Florida Power & Light Co	Baker	74.5	2020
6	FPL Etonia Creek	Florida Power & Light Co	Putnam	74.5	2023
7	Georges Lake	Florida Power & Light Co	Putnam	74.5	2024
8	Hecate Energy Blair Road LLC	Hecate Energy Blair Road LLC	Duval	4.0	2018
9	Horizon Solar Energy Center	Florida Power & Light Co	Putnam	74.5	2018
10	IKEA Jacksonville Rooftop PV System	IKEA Property Inc	Duval	1.4	2017
11	Imeson Solar	Imeson Solar Farm LLC	Duval	5.0	2019
12	Jacksonville Solar	Jacksonville Solar LLC	Duval	12.6	2010
13	Magnolia Springs Solar Center	Florida Power & Light Co	Clay	74.5	2021
14	Nassau Solar Center	Florida Power & Light Co	Nassau	74.5	2020
15	Nature Trail	Florida Power & Light Co	Baker	74.5	2024
16	Northern Preserve Solar	Florida Power & Light Co	Baker	74.5	2020
17	Old Plank Road Solar Farm, LLC	Southeastern Solar Farm Fund, LLC	Duval	3.0	2017
18	Rice Creek	Origis Energy USA, Inc	Putnam	74.9	2024
19	Starratt Solar	C2 Starratt Solar LLC	Duval	5.0	2017
20	Terrill Creek	Florida Power & Light Co	Clay	74.5	2024
21	Thomas Creek	Florida Power & Light Co	Nassau	74.5	2025
22	Trailside Solar Center	Florida Power & Light Co	St. Johns	74.5	2020
23	Tupelo Solar	FRP Tupelo Solar, LLC	Putnam	74.5	2024
24	Twin Lakes	Florida Power & Light Co	Putnam	74.5	2020

==== Northwest Florida region ====
Solar Facilities in Florida (Northwest Florida Region)
#	Plant Name	Utility Name	County	Capacity (MW)	Operating Year
1	Apalachee	Florida Power & Light Co	Jackson	74.5	2023
2	Bay Ranch Solar Power Plant	Duke Energy Florida, LLC	Bay	74.9	2023
3	Big Juniper Solar	Florida Power & Light Co	Santa Rosa	74.5	2024
4	Blackwater River Solar Energy Center	Florida Power & Light Co	Santa Rosa	74.5	2023
5	Blue Springs	Florida Power & Light Co	Jackson	74.5	2022
6	Canoe	Florida Power & Light Co	Okaloosa	74.5	2024
7	Chautauqua Solar Energy Center	Florida Power & Light Co	Walton	74.5	2023
8	CoTAL Solar Farm	Onward Energy	Leon	20.0	2017
9	Cotton Creek Solar Energy Center	Florida Power & Light Co	Escambia	74.5	2021
10	FL Solar 4, LLC	Onward Energy	Leon	42.0	2019
11	FL Solar D1, LLC	Altus Power America Management, LLC	Gadsden	4.0	2023
12	FL Solar D2, LLC	Altus Power America Management, LLC	Wakulla	2.0	2023
13	FPL Chipola River Solar Energy Center	Florida Power & Light Co	Calhoun	74.5	2023
14	FPL Cypress Pond Solar	Florida Power & Light Co	Washington	74.5	2023
15	FPL Flowers Creek Solar Energy Center	Florida Power & Light Co	Calhoun	74.5	2023
16	FPL Saw Palmetto Solar Energy Center	Florida Power & Light Co	Bay	74.5	2023
17	FPL Shirer Branch Solar Energy Center	Florida Power & Light Co	Calhoun	74.5	2023
18	First City Solar Energy Center	Florida Power & Light Co	Escambia	74.5	2023
19	Fourmile Creek	Florida Power & Light Co	Calhoun	74.5	2024
20	Gadsden County Solar	FRP Gadsden County Solar, LLC	Gadsden	74.5	2024
21	Gulf Coast Solar Center I	Arevon Energy, Inc.	Okaloosa	30.0	2017
22	Gulf Coast Solar Center II	Arevon Energy, Inc.	Santa Rosa	40.0	2017
23	Gulf Coast Solar Center III	Arevon Energy, Inc.	Escambia	50.0	2017
24	Gulf Power Blue Indigo Energy	Florida Power & Light Co	Jackson	74.5	2020
25	Kayak	Florida Power & Light Co	Okaloosa	74.5	2024
26	Mitchell Creek	Florida Power & Light Co	Escambia	74.5	2024
27	Mule Creek Renewable Energy Center	Duke Energy Florida, LLC	Bay	74.9	2024
28	Pecan Tree	Florida Power & Light Co	Walton	74.5	2024
29	Sandy Creek Solar Power Plant	Duke Energy Florida, LLC	Bay	74.9	2022
30	Sparkleberry	Florida Power & Light Co	Escambia	74.5	2024
31	Swallowtail	Florida Power & Light Co	Walton	74.5	2025
32	Tenmile Creek	Florida Power & Light Co	Calhoun	74.5	2025
33	Wild Azalea Solar Energy Center	Florida Power & Light Co	Gadsden	74.5	2023
34	Wild Quail	Florida Power & Light Co	Walton	74.5	2024

==== Southeast Florida region ====
Solar Facilities in Florida (Southeast Florida Region)
#	Plant Name	Utility Name	County	Capacity (MW)	Operating Year
1	Everglades Solar Energy Center	Florida Power & Light Co	Miami-Dade	74.5	2023
2	FIU Solar	Florida Power & Light Co	Miami-Dade	1.2	2016
3	Hibiscus Solar Energy Center	Florida Power & Light Co	Palm Beach	74.5	2020
4	Holopaw	Florida Power & Light Co	Palm Beach	74.5	2025
5	IKEA Miami 327	IKEA Property Inc	Miami-Dade	1.0	2015
6	Miami Dade Solar Energy Center	Florida Power & Light Co	Miami-Dade	74.5	2019
7	Pembroke Lakes Mall	Pembroke Lakes Mall	Broward	1.1	2016
8	Redlands	Florida Power & Light Co	Miami-Dade	74.5	2025
9	Sabal Palm Solar Center	Florida Power & Light Co	Palm Beach	74.5	2021
10	Silver Palm	Florida Power & Light Co	Palm Beach	74.5	2024

==== Southwest Florida region ====
Solar Facilities in Florida (Southwest Florida Region)
#	Plant Name	Utility Name	County	Capacity (MW)	Operating Year
1	Babcock Preserve	Florida Power & Light Co	Charlotte	74.5	2020
2	Babcock Solar Energy Center Hybrid	Florida Power & Light Co	Charlotte	74.5	2016
3	Beautyberry	Florida Power & Light Co	Hendry	74.5	2024
4	Blue Heron Solar	Florida Power & Light Co	Hendry	74.5	2020
5	Caloosahatchee	Florida Power & Light Co	Hendry	74.5	2024
6	Cattle Ranch	Florida Power & Light Co	DeSoto	74.5	2020
7	Citrus Solar Energy Center Hybrid	Florida Power & Light Co	DeSoto	74.5	2016
8	DeSoto Next Generation Solar Energy	Florida Power & Light Co	DeSoto	25.0	2009
9	Ghost Orchid Solar Energy Center	Florida Power & Light Co	Hendry	74.5	2022
10	Green Pasture	Florida Power & Light Co	Charlotte	74.5	2025
11	Hammock Solar	Florida Power & Light Co	Hendry	74.5	2018
12	Hawthorne Creek	Florida Power & Light Co	DeSoto	74.5	2024
13	Hendry Isles	Florida Power & Light Co	Hendry	74.5	2024
14	Hog Bay	Florida Power & Light Co	DeSoto	74.5	2025
15	Immokalee	Florida Power & Light Co	Collier	74.5	2022
16	Prairie Creek FL	Florida Power & Light Co	DeSoto	74.5	2024
17	Rodeo Solar Center	Florida Power & Light Co	DeSoto	74.5	2021
18	Sawgrass Solar Energy Center	Florida Power & Light Co	Hendry	74.5	2022
19	Wildflower Solar Energy Center	Florida Power & Light Co	DeSoto	74.5	2018
20	Woodyard	Florida Power & Light Co	Hendry	74.5	2024

=== History ===
In 2009, Florida Power & Light built the state's first solar power plant, the FPL DeSoto Next Generation Solar Energy Center. At the time, the 25-MW plant was the largest of its kind. In 2010, FPL built the world's first hybrid solar-natural gas energy center.

One of the state's largest solar plants is the 75 MW FPL Martin Next Generation Solar Energy Center, in Martin County operated by Florida Power and Light. It was the world's first hybrid solar-natural gas energy center and is a concentrated solar power (CSP) plant using solar thermal instead of photovoltaic technology. No additional CSP plants are under development in Florida, although in 2007 a 300 MW Fresnel CSP plant had been planned.

The state's largest photovoltaic plant was the 25 MW DeSoto Next Generation Solar Energy Center, operated by Florida Power and Light, completed in 2009. Florida Power and Light also operates the Space Coast Next Generation Solar Energy Center, a 10 MW photovoltaic facility near the Kennedy Space Center.

The 100 MW Sorrento Solar Farm was expected to become Florida's largest photovoltaic solar farm with 40 MW of photovoltaic capacity already under construction in Lake County. However the company Blue Chip Energy became insolvent and the equipment and farm site were sold at a public auction in 2013.

Florida Power and Light announced in October 2014 that it would build three more power plants by the end of 2016. The FPL Manatee Solar Energy Center is located in Manatee County at a natural gas power plant, FPL Citris Solar Energy Center is in DeSoto County, near the FPL DeSoto Next Generation Solar Energy Center, and FPL Babcock Ranch Solar Energy Center is in Charlotte County. The three plants together generate 225 MW, approximately the same as the total solar power installed in the entire state at the time.

Tampa Electric Company is building a 2 MW farm at the Tampa International Airport. Gulf Power Company and the U.S. military announced contracts for the construction of 3 large plants in Florida: a 50 MW project at Saufley Field in Pensacola, a 40 MW project being at Holley Field in Navarre, and a 30 MW project at Eglin Air Force Base.

In April 2015, Duke Energy Florida proposed to build 500MW of solar in the next ten years.

State-level energy initiatives have played a key role in shaping Florida’s solar landscape, particularly through the Florida Energy & Climate Change Initiative, which promotes renewable adoption.

These incentives have expanded residential and commercial access to solar technologies, improving long-term energy resilience across the state.

Tallahassee International Airport (TLH) has two phases of solar projects totaling 83 MWdc.

Duke Energy and Walt Disney World built a 5 MW solar farm near Epcot Center which has been called the Walt Disney World Solar Facility, or 'Hidden Mickey'. It is visible from the air as a giant Mickey Mouse shape. It sells power to Walt Disney World. Disney World will soon be adding a new solar farm ten times larger than the Hidden Mickey farm. Reedy Creek Improvement District and Origis Energy are in agreement to build the farm on the western edge of Disney's property. It will provide renewable solar power to the Reedy Creek Improvement District and to Disney World.

In April 2018, Babcock Ranch began attempting to become fully solar-powered. Florida Power and Light partnered with town founders to build a 75 MW solar-generating facility that's already running. The land was purchased in 2006 and more than 90% is being preserved for wildlife.

As of 2021, Florida has 49 projects just under 75 MWac in capacity all tied for the state's largest solar facilities; this is the maximum size permitted without review under the Florida Power Plant Siting Act. In 2024, Florida’s solar capacity reached over 13,000 megawatts, making it one of the fastest-growing solar energy producers in the United States.

== Solar panels ==
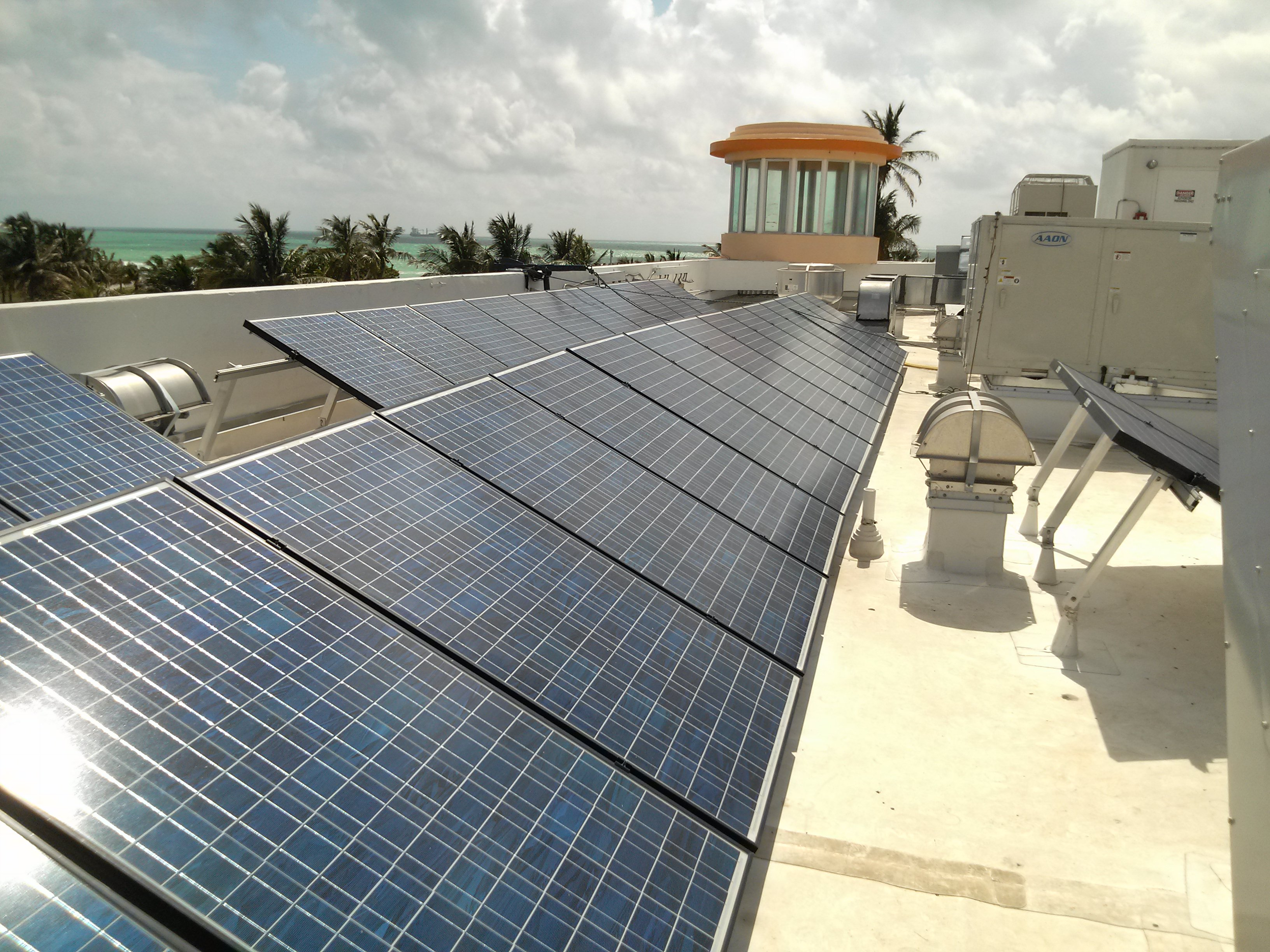
Medium installation on South Beach roof in 2012.

Developers in Florida have announced the addition of solar panels on all new homes in several subdivisions.

In 2013, it was discovered that Blue Chip Energy was selling fraudulent solar panels to hundreds of consumers throughout Florida.

== Statistics ==
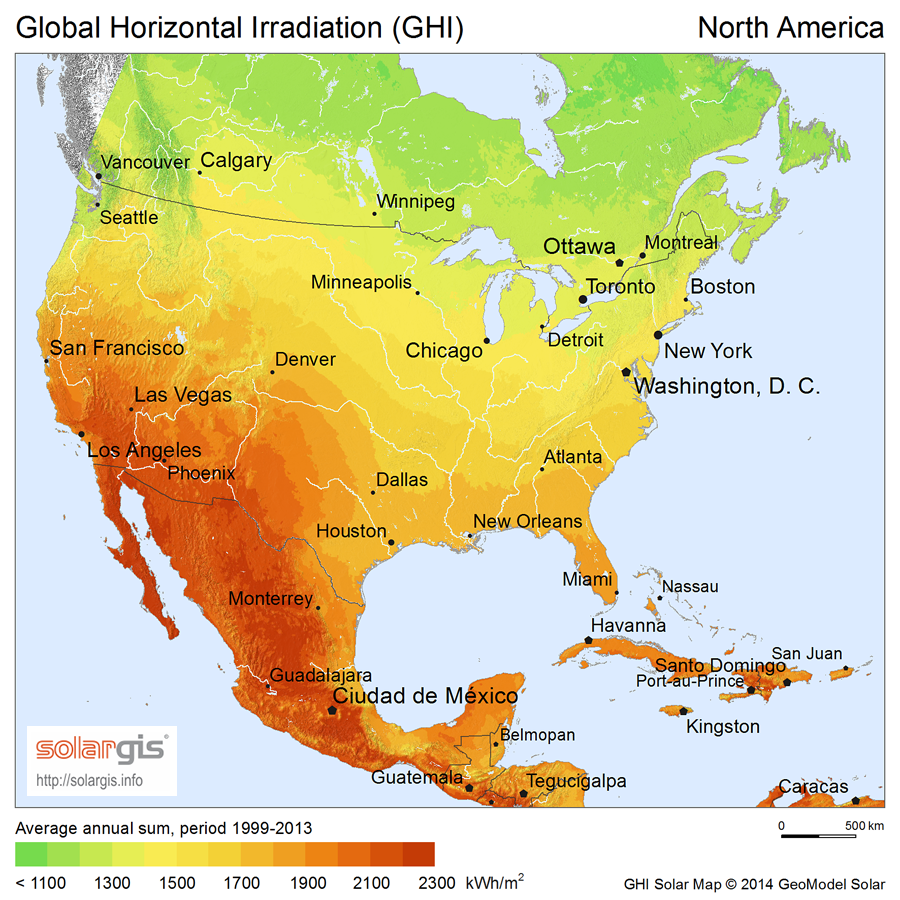
Average solar insolation

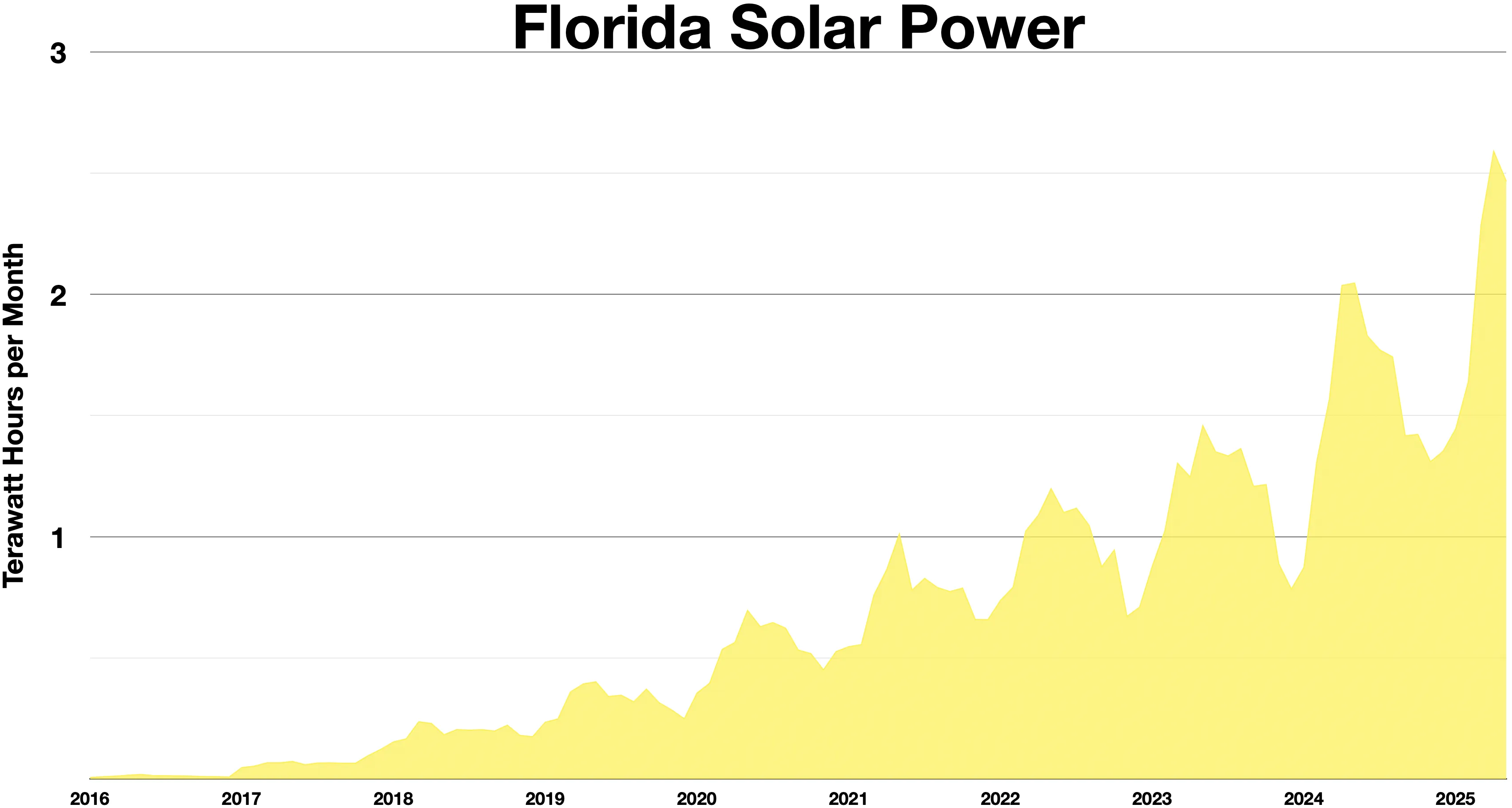
Florida solar power 2016–2025

=== Potential generation ===
Solar energy is the state's most abundant energy resource and estimates have placed the state's potential at 2,902 GW, which would produce about 5,274,479 GWh, an amount much larger than the state and countries' total electricity consumption of 231,210 GWh and 4,125,060 GWh in 2010. Florida is one of only two states in the USA with no potential for conventional wind power, with the other being Mississippi, and will need to either import energy from other states during overcast days and at night, or provide adequate grid energy storage.

Analysts have noted that statistics published before 2018 may not accurately reflect current trends due to rapid growth in the state’s solar sector.

Updated reporting frameworks emphasize separating data by capacity growth, policy changes, and economic impacts to improve clarity and reliability.

Research and innovation efforts in Florida are supported through the Florida Solar Energy Center (FSEC), which leads initiatives in photovoltaic testing and renewable energy development. FSEC's collaborations with universities and government agencies position Florida as a contributor to advancements in solar reliability and grid integration.

Most of the potential is from photovoltaics, which provides no storage. The state has some potential for concentrated solar power, but the potential is estimated at 130 MW. Taller, 140 meter hub height wind turbines allow up to 153 GW of wind turbines in Florida alone.

The economic impact of solar energy in Florida continues to grow, with the industry supporting thousands of jobs statewide.

Increased solar development has also generated economic activity through manufacturing expansion, construction contracts, and long-term operations roles tied to utility-scale solar projects.

=== Installed capacity ===
Florida solar capacity (MWp)
Year	Photovoltaics			CSP		
Year	Capacity	Change	% change	Capacity	Change	% change
2008	3.3	0.9	38%	0	–	–
2009	39.0	35.7	1082%	0	–	–
2010	73.8	34.8	87%	75	75	–
2011	95.0	21.2	30%	75	0	–
2012	116.9	21.9	23%	75	0	–
2013	137.3	20.4	17%	75	0	–
2014	159	22	16%	75	0	–
2015	200	41	26%	75	0	–
2016	682	482	241%	75	0	–
2017	1,432	750	110%	75	0	–
2018	2,289	857	60%	75	0	–
2019	3,690.3	1,401.3	61%	75	0	–
2020	6,539.8	2,849.5	77%	75	0	–
2021	8,205.5	1,665.7	25%			
2022	10,111	1,905.5	23%			
2023	13,912	3,801	38%			
Sources: Interstate Renewable Energy Council (IREC), SEIA

== See also ==
- Florida Amendment 1 (2016)
- List of power stations in Florida
- Renewable energy in the United States
- Solar landfill
- Solar power in the United States
- Thin film solar on standing seam metal roofs
