= JEA Northside Generating Station =

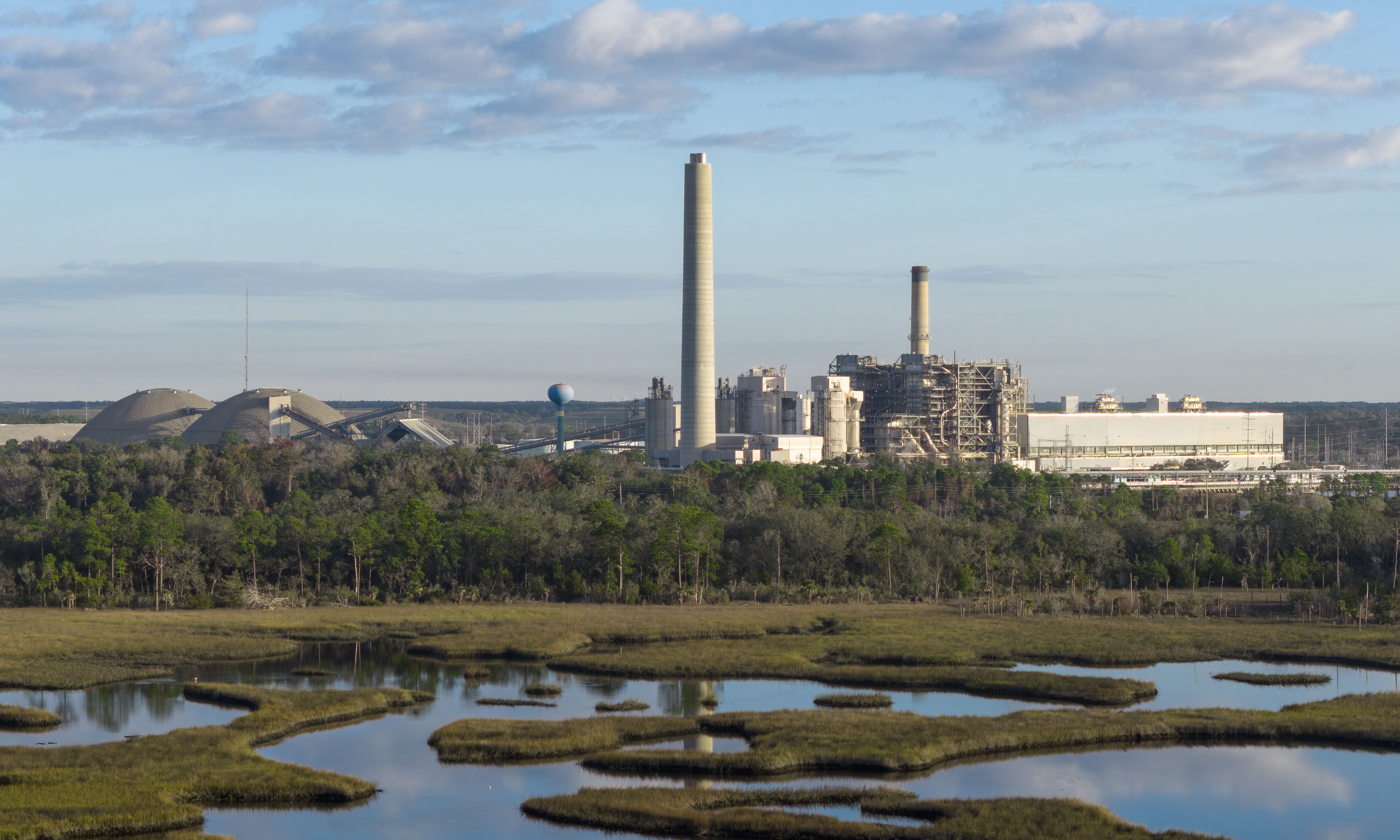
- JEA Northside Generating Station from the south
- Country: United States
- Location: Jacksonville, Florida
- Coordinates: 30°25′43″N 81°33′10″W
- Status: Operational
- Commission date: Unit 1 (Originally #6 fuel oil, now pet coke/coal): 1966; Unit 2 (Originally #6 fuel oil, now pet coke/coal): 1972; NSCT-3 (Gas turbine, distillate fuel oil): 1975; Unit 3 (Utility boiler, #6 fuel oil and natural gas): 1977; NSCT-4 (Gas turbine, distillate fuel oil): 1975; NSCT-5 (Gas turbine, distillate fuel oil): 1974; NSCT-6 (Gas turbine, distillate fuel oil): 1974
- Owner: JEA

Thermal power station
- Primary fuel: Petroleum coke, distillate fuel oil, residual fuel oil, bituminous coal, natural gas
- Turbine technology: Steam, gas turbine
- Cooling source: St. Johns River

Power generation
- Units operational: 7
- Nameplate capacity: 1,300 MWe

JEA Northside Generating Station in Jacksonville, Florida is a major power plant, one of the three power plants owned and operated by JEA, Jacksonville's municipal utilities service. It produces electricity by burning coal and petroleum coke at Units 1 and 2, formerly the largest circulating fluidized-bed combustors, (CFBs), in the world. These combustors, completed in 2002 and rated at 297.5 megawatts each, produce enough electricity to light more than 250,000 households. In addition, Unit ST3 produces 505 megawatts of electricity by burning residual fuel oil and/or natural gas.

== Location ==
The Northside Generating Station is located north-east of the interchange of Interstate 295 and State Road 105 in the city of Jacksonville, Florida. It is 8.5 miles (13.7 km) from the Atlantic Ocean coastline, on the north bank of a back channel of the St. Johns River, which is being used as a waterway for fuel delivery as well as a source of cooling water. The Northside Generating Station also borders Timucuan Ecological and Historic Preserve that consists of North Florida wetlands and contains historic sites of Timucua peoples.

== History ==
The Northside Generating Station began producing electricity for Jacksonville in March, 1966 with oil as its only fuel, when former Unit 1, rated at 275 megawatts, was installed. In June, 1972 a similar Unit 2 was launched, but had to be shut down in 1983 due to major boiler problems. A plant expansion in 1977 added a 564-megawatt Unit 3, which is still in operation today. This expansion enabled the use of oil and natural gas fuels. In 1996, JEA committed to reduce certain pollutants from the Northside Station by at least 10% when it upgraded Unit 2 (non-functional at the time) and Unit 1 by introducing the new clean coal technology. This most recent upgrade was funded by JEA (234 million USD) and the U.S. Department of Energy (75 million USD). Initial synchronization was achieved for Unit 2 on February 19, 2002, and for Unit 1 on May 29, 2002. As a result, the facility generates significantly more power now.

== CFB Technology ==
CFB technology is an advanced method for burning coal and other fuels efficiently while removing air emissions inside the sophisticated combustor system. CFB technology provides flexibility in utility operations because a wide variety of solid fuels can be used, including high-sulfur, high-ash coal and petroleum coke.

In a CFB combustor, coal or other fuels, air, and crushed limestone or other sorbents are injected into the lower portion of the combustor for initial burning of the fuel. The combustion actually occurs in a bed of fuel, sorbent, and ash particles that are fluidized by air nozzles in the bottom of the combustor. The air expands the bed, creates turbulence for enhanced mixing, and provides most of the oxygen necessary for combustion of the fuel. As the fuel particles decrease in size through combustion and breakage, they are transported higher in the combustor where additional air is injected. As the particles continue to decrease in size, unreacted fuel, ash, and fine limestone particles are swept out of the combustor, collected in a particle separator (also called a cyclone), and recycled to the lower portion of the combustor. This is the "circulating" nature of the combustor. Drains in the bottom of the combustor remove a fraction of the bed composed primarily of ash while new fuel and sorbent are added. The combustion ash is suitable for beneficial uses such as road construction material, agricultural fertilizer, and reclaiming surface mining areas.

The limestone captures up to 98% of the sulfur impurities released from the fuel. When heated in the CFB combustor, the limestone, consisting primarily of calcium carbonate (CaCO_{3}), converts to calcium oxide (CaO) and CO_{2} . The CaO reacts with the SO_{2} from the burning fuel to form calcium sulfate (CaSO_{4}), an inert material that is removed with the combustion ash. The combustion efficiency of the CFB combustor allows the fuel to be burned at a relatively low temperature of about 1,650 °F (900 °C), thus reducing NO_{x} formation by approximately 60% compared with conventional coal-fired technologies. Greater than 99% of particulate emissions in the flue gas are removed downstream of the combustor by either an electrostatic precipitator or a fabric filter (baghouse).

The heated combustor converts water in tubes lining the combustor's walls to high pressure steam. The steam is then superheated in tube bundles placed in the solids circulating stream and the flue gas stream. The superheated steam drives a steam turbine-generator to produce electricity in a conventional steam cycle.

== Fuel supply ==
The plant uses a continuous ship unloader, the only one of its type in the continental United States. The solid fuel is transferred from barges onto the fuel conveyor system, which in turn transports it to the two largest fuel storage domes in North America. Pet coke and coal travel from the ship to the domes in about twenty minutes, entirely inside a sealed system to prevent dust particles from escaping into the surrounding environment.

== Water use ==
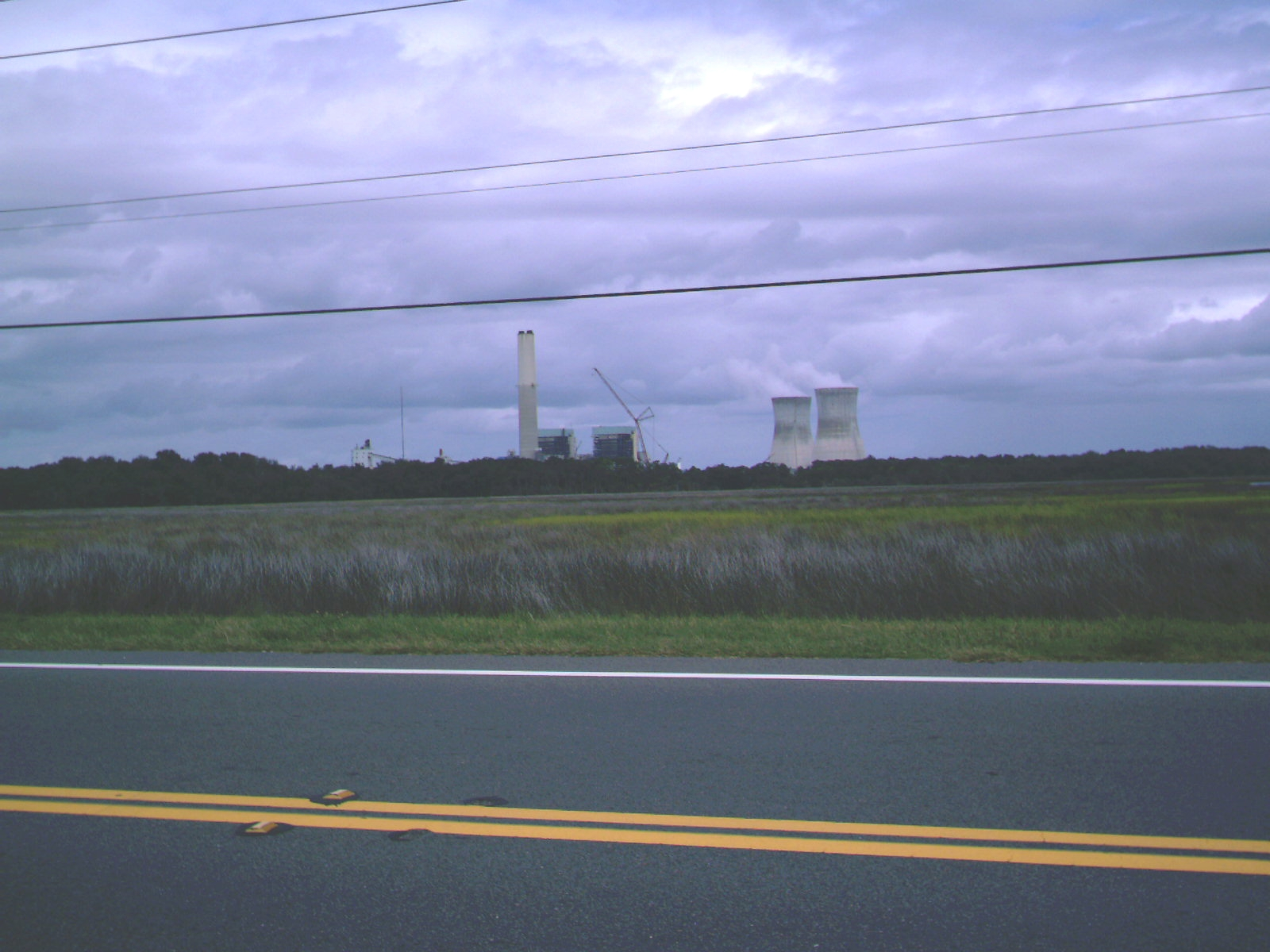
View of cooling towers at the Saint Johns River Power Park, located immediately north of JEA's Northside Generating Station, from SR 105.

Water is delivered by an elevated intake flume from the back channel of the St. Johns River to cool the station's condensers, after which the water is returned to the back channel. This cooling water does not mix with other liquid process streams while in contact with the condensers. Because Unit 2 has been out of service since 1983, the actual demand for cooling water by Northside Generating Station at full load since that time has been approximately 620 million U.S. gallons per day (Mgd), or 430,700 US gallons (1,630 m^{3}) per minute, to operate Units 1 and 3. Operation of the entire 3-unit plant occurred only from about 1978 until 1980. During that time, the demand for cooling water was approximately 827 Mgd (574,000 US gallons (2,170 m^{3}) per minute): 24.5% for Unit 1, 24.5% for Unit 2, and 51% for Unit 3. This amount of surface water supplied to the station was approximately 10% of the average flow passing through the back channel of the St. Johns River.

Before passing through the condensers, noncontact cooling water at Northside Generating Station is treated intermittently with a biocide to prevent biological growth on the heat exchanger tubes. Sodium hypochlorite (NaOCl) and occasionally sodium bromide (NaBr) are used. Treatment occurs no more than 2 hours per day per operating unit. The St. Johns River Power Park taps into the discharge side of the Northside Generating Station condensers to obtain cooling tower makeup. The average surface water flow supplied to the Power Park heat rejection system is 50 Mgd (34,400 US gallons (130 m^{3}) per minute). Approximately 25% of this surface water evaporates into the atmosphere from the cooling towers. Cooling tower blowdown is routed back into Northside Generating Station's discharge collector basin. The daily average temperature of the cooling tower blowdown is limited to 96 °F (36 °C).

== Emissions ==
Preliminary Emission Tests were conducted on Units 1 and 2 over the summer of 2002. Testing was conducted on both units burning coal and petroleum coke. Results are summarized in the table below. Emissions results from both units met all emission requirements for particulate, SO_{2}, acid gases and heavy metals.

Emission Test Results for Units 1 and 2.
Pollutant	Units	Emission Standard	Coal-fired	Petroleum Coke-fired
SO_{2}	lb/million BTU	≤ 0.15	0.0−0.04	0.03−0.13
NO_{x}	lb/million BTU	≤ 0.09	0.04−0.06	0.02
Solid particulate	lb/million BTU	≤ 0.011	0.004	0.007
PM10	lb/million BTU	≤ 0.011	0.006	0.004
SO_{3}	lb/hour	≤ 1.1	0.43	0.0
Fluoride	lb/million BTU	≤ 1.57×10^{−4}	1.06×10^{−4}	0.95×10^{−4}
Lead	lb/million BTU	≤ 2.6×10^{−5}	0.56×10^{−5}	0.59×10^{−5}
Mercury	lb/million BTU	≤ 1.05×10^{−5}	0.095×10^{−5}	0.028×10^{−5}

== Conflicts and controversies ==
Soot coming from the JEA Northside Generating Station has prompted Distribution and Auto Services Inc. to threaten leaving Jacksonville area if the problem persists. Vehicle processing companies such as Auto Services Inc. prepare automobiles for dealers by cleaning, inspecting, customizing, and fixing defects. In 2001, such companies at Jacksonville processed 579,924 vehicles. Auto Services Inc. had to wash 50,000 cars to remove soot, the letter from the company's attorney said in 2002. The soot did not cause any damage to the vehicles, but a fallout occurring during a drizzle or when dew forms on vehicles could release acid that mars plastic equipment, the letter said. The JEA paid $82,000 to the vehicle-processing company to cover the cost of washing automobiles during the summer of 2002, according to JEA spokesman.

== See also ==
- List of power stations in Florida
- Global warming
