= Seminole Generating Station =

Power plant in Florida, US

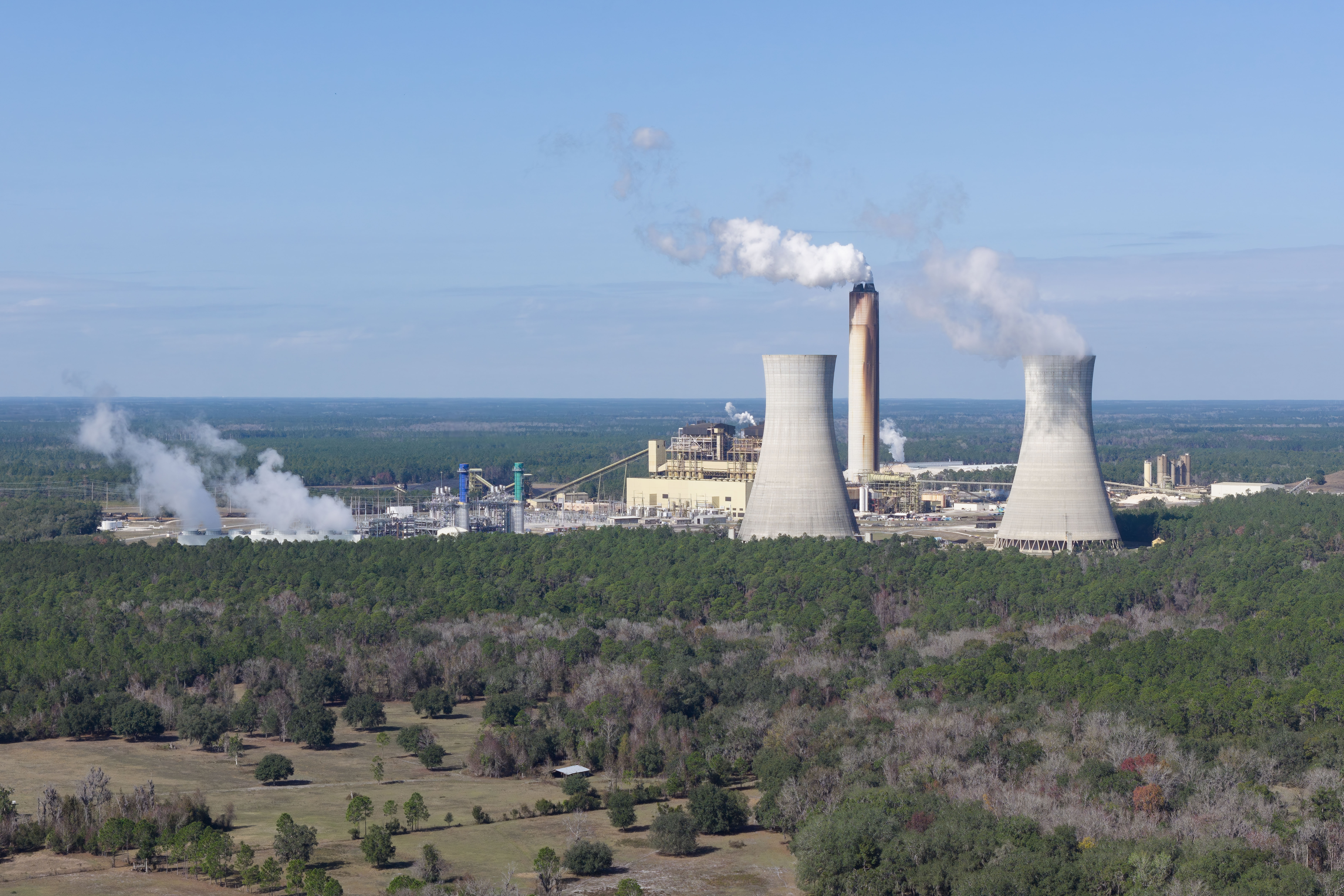
- Seminole Generating Station in 2026
- Country: United States
- Location: Palatka, Florida
- Coordinates: 29.733056°N 81.632778°W
- Status: Operational
- Commission date: Unit 1: January 1984; Unit 2: December 1984
- Decommission date: Unit 1: January 2024
- Owner: Seminole Electric Cooperative

Thermal power station
- Primary fuel: Coal
- Secondary fuel: Petroleum coke
- Tertiary fuel: Fuel oil

Power generation
- Units operational: 1 × 714.6 MW
- Nameplate capacity: 715 MW

The Seminole Generating Station is a large fossil-fuel power plant in Putnam County, Florida, near Palatka, Florida. The station was developed by Seminole Electric Cooperative and originally entered service in the mid-1980s with two 650 MW coal-fired generating units (Units 1 and 2). The units are capable of firing bituminous coal and blends including petroleum coke, and the plant has long included major emissions controls. Scrubber byproducts have been marketed as synthetic gypsum to an adjacent wallboard facility. An approved natural-gas combined-cycle project is intended to replace one of the coal units.

In January 2024, Unit 1 was decommissioned after 40 years of service.

== Power plant ==
Unit	Reactor type	Capacity		Commercial operation	Shutdown
Unit	Reactor type	Net	Gross	Commercial operation	Shutdown
Unit 1	Coal, water-cooled	652 MW	736 MW	January 1984	January 2024
Unit 2	Coal, water-cooled	657 MW	715 MW	December 1984	

== See also ==
- List of power stations in Florida
