= Turkey Point Nuclear Generating Station =

Nuclear and gas-fired power plant located near Homestead, Florida

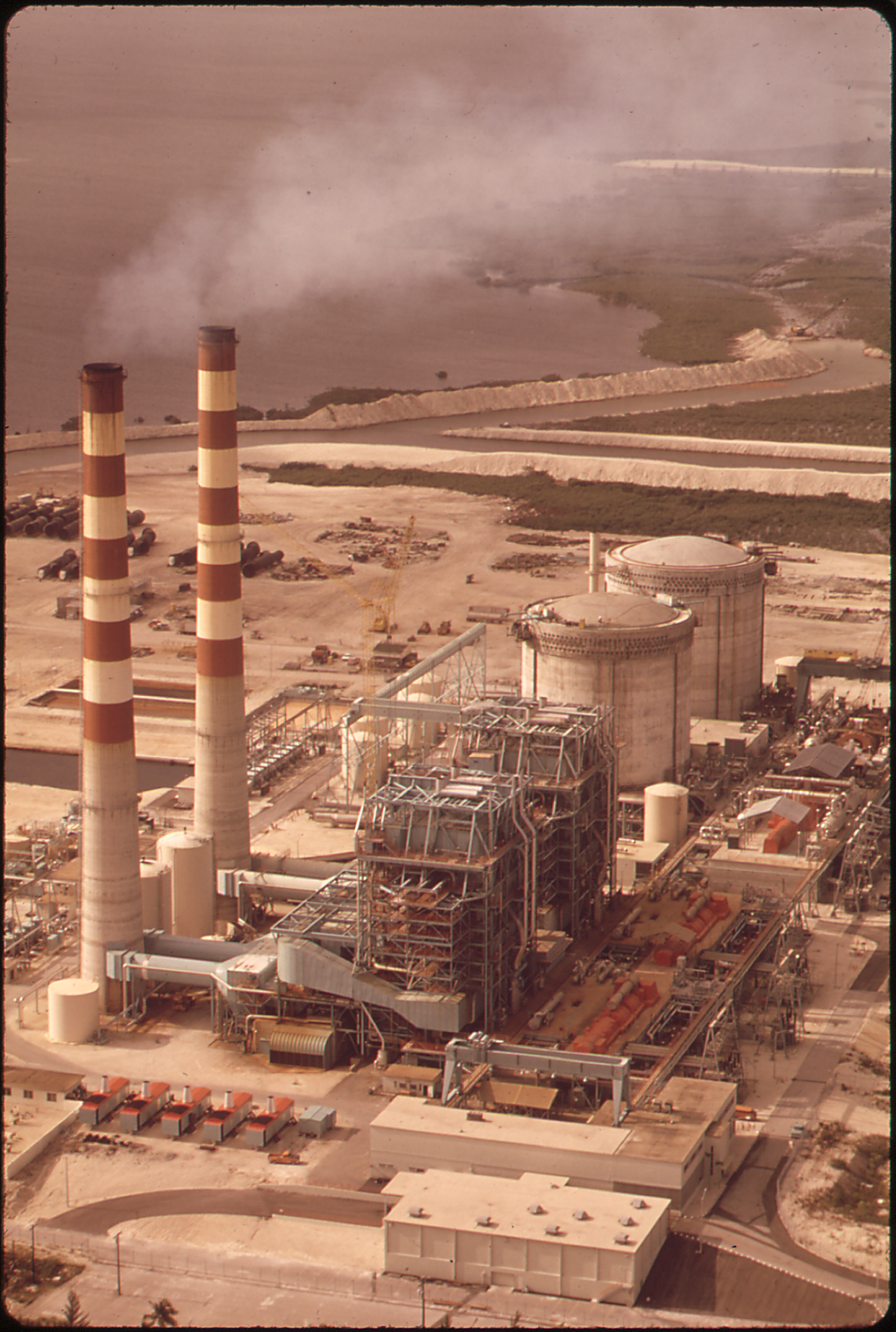
- Turkey Point Nuclear Generating Station in Homestead, Florida
- Official name: Turkey Point
- Country: United States
- Location: Homestead, Florida, U.S.
- Coordinates: 25°26′3″N 80°19′50″W
- Status: Operational
- Construction began: Unit 3–4: April 27, 1967
- Commission date: Unit 1: April 1967; Unit 2: April 1968; Unit 3: December 14, 1972; Unit 4: September 7, 1973; Unit 5: May 2007
- Construction cost: Units 3–4: $1.013 billion (2007 USD); Unit 5: $200 million (2007 USD)
- Owner: Florida Power & Light
- Operator: Florida Power & Light

Nuclear power station
- Reactor type: PWR
- Reactor supplier: Westinghouse

Thermal power station
- Primary fuel: Natural gas
- Secondary fuel: Distillate fuel oil
- Tertiary fuel: Residual fuel oil
- Turbine technology: Steam turbine (Units 1–2, Unit 5), gas turbine (Unit 5)
- Cooling source: Canal system (Units 1–2); Canal system (Units 3–4); Mechanical draft 22-cell cooling tower (Unit 5)
- Combined cycle?: No (Units 1–2); Yes (Unit 5)
- Thermal capacity: 2 × 2644 MW_{th} (nuclear)

Power generation
- Units operational: 2 × 802 MW (nuclear); 1 × 1150 MW (CCGT)
- Make and model: 2 × WH 3-loop (DRYAMB); 4 × 170–180 MW GE 7FA gas turbines 4 × Nooter gas-fired heat recovery steam generators 1 × 470 MW steam turbine
- Units planned: 2 × 1117 MW AP1000
- Units decommissioned: 2 × 404 MW Foster-Wheeler fuel oil/natural gas/used oil/propane steam turbines
- Nameplate capacity: 2754 MW (1604 MW nuclear, 1150 MW CCGT)
- Capacity factor: 74.71% (2017, 90.51% nuclear, 52.65% CCGT)
- Annual net output: 13,904 GWh (2021 - nuclear); 5,431 GWh (2021 - CCGT)

External links
- Website: Turkey Point Nuclear Plant
- Commons: Related media on Commons

Turkey Point Nuclear Generating Station is a nuclear and gas-fired power plant located on a 3,300-acre (1,300 ha) site two miles east of Homestead, Florida, United States, next to Biscayne National Park located about 25 miles (40 km) south of Miami, Florida near the southernmost edge of Miami-Dade County. The facility is owned by Florida Power & Light.

Including the two nuclear reactors, Turkey Point operates three power-generating units. It comprises two retired 404 megawatt fuel oil/natural gas/used oil/propane-fired generation units (Units 1 and 2), two 802 MW_{e} Westinghouse pressurized water reactors (Units 3 and 4), and a 1,150 MW combined-cycle gas-fired Unit 5. With a combined operational capacity of 2754 MW, the site is the third largest generating station in Florida and the eleventh largest power plant in the United States.

The US Nuclear Regulatory Commission has authorized its staff to issue combined licences for Florida Power and Light to build and operate two Westinghouse AP1000 reactors at its Turkey Point site.

== Construction ==
The two pressurized water reactors were completed in 1972 and 1973.

=== Expansion ===
In 2002, the Nuclear Regulatory Commission (NRC) extended the operating licenses for both nuclear reactors from forty years to sixty years. In 2006, Florida Power & Light (FPL) informed the NRC that they planned to apply for new units to be built at Turkey Point. FPL filed an initial proposal for increased capacity with the Florida Public Service Commission in October 2007. The proposal was approved by the PSC in March 2008.

FPL also planned to spend about $1.5 billion to increase the capacity of its existing four reactors at Turkey Point and the St. Lucie Nuclear Power Plant by a total of about 400 MW by 2012.

On June 30, 2009, FPL submitted a Combined Construction and Operating License (COL) application for two 1,117 MWe Westinghouse AP1000 reactors (Units 6 and 7). FPL had considered building two 1,550 MWe GE ESBWR reactors. Construction was expected to begin in 2012, with the new units going online in 2017 and 2019. FPL estimated the total overnight costs of the power plants, including first fuel load, at $6.8–$9.9 billion, and the total project cost at $12.1–$17.8 billion. The COLs for units 6 and 7 were authorized by the NRC in April 2018.

=== Criticism of expansion ===
The expansion received criticism from some South Florida mayors over concerns about water usage, insufficient evacuation zones and increased risks from rising sea levels. However, the mayor of Homestead, the closest community to the FPL facilities, supports it.

== Surrounding population ==
The Nuclear Regulatory Commission defines two emergency planning zones around nuclear power plants: a plume exposure pathway zone with a radius of 10 miles (16 km), concerned primarily with exposure to, and inhalation of, airborne radioactive contamination, and an ingestion pathway zone of about 50 miles (80 km), concerned primarily with ingestion of food and liquid contaminated by radioactivity.

The 2010 U.S. population within 10 miles (16 km) of Turkey Point was 161,556, an increase of 62.8 percent in a decade, according to an analysis of U.S. Census data for msnbc.com. The 2010 U.S. population within 50 miles (80 km) was 3,476,981, an increase of 15.1 percent since 2000. Cities within 50 miles include Miami (25 miles to city center).

== Incident history ==
=== May 8, 1974 ===
A test was performed on all three of the Emergency Feedwater (EFW) pumps serving Unit 3 while the reactor was operating at power. Two of the pumps failed to start as a result of overtightened packing. The third pump failed to start because of a malfunction in the turbine regulating valve pneumatic controller. In an ongoing study of precursors that could lead to a nuclear accident if additional failures were to have occurred, the NRC concluded in October 2005 that this event at Turkey Point Unit 3 was the fifth-highest ranked occurrence.

=== August 24, 1992 ===
Turkey Point was directly hit by Hurricane Andrew on August 24, 1992, destroying two raw water tanks and portions of the fire protection systems, draining another raw water tank, partially disabling the fire protection systems, causing severe damage to various non-nuclear structures, and cracking the smokestack for fossil-fueled Unit 1. The smokestack later had to be demolished and rebuilt. It also suffered a total loss of offsite power, requiring the use of the onsite emergency diesel generators for several days. No significant damage was done to the plant's nuclear containment buildings. The plant was built to withstand winds of up to 235 mph (380 km/h), greatly exceeding the maximum winds recorded by most category 5 hurricanes.

=== March 18, 2017 ===
On March 18, 2017, an electrical fault occurred in a Unit 3 switchgear room, resulting in the loss of a safety related electrical bus and a reactor trip. Other safety systems functioned as required, ensuring adequate reactor cooling. There was no threat to local residents or the environment, and the alert, the second-lowest Nuclear Regulatory Commission (NRC) emergency declaration, was terminated later that same day. The electrical fault caused an arc flash, resulting in a minor burn of a plant worker who was in the room and was treated at a local hospital. On March 22, 2017, the Nuclear Regulatory Commission announced that it had initiated a special inspection into the failure of the electrical bus that resulted in the plant declaring an alert.

== 2008 Florida electricity blackout ==
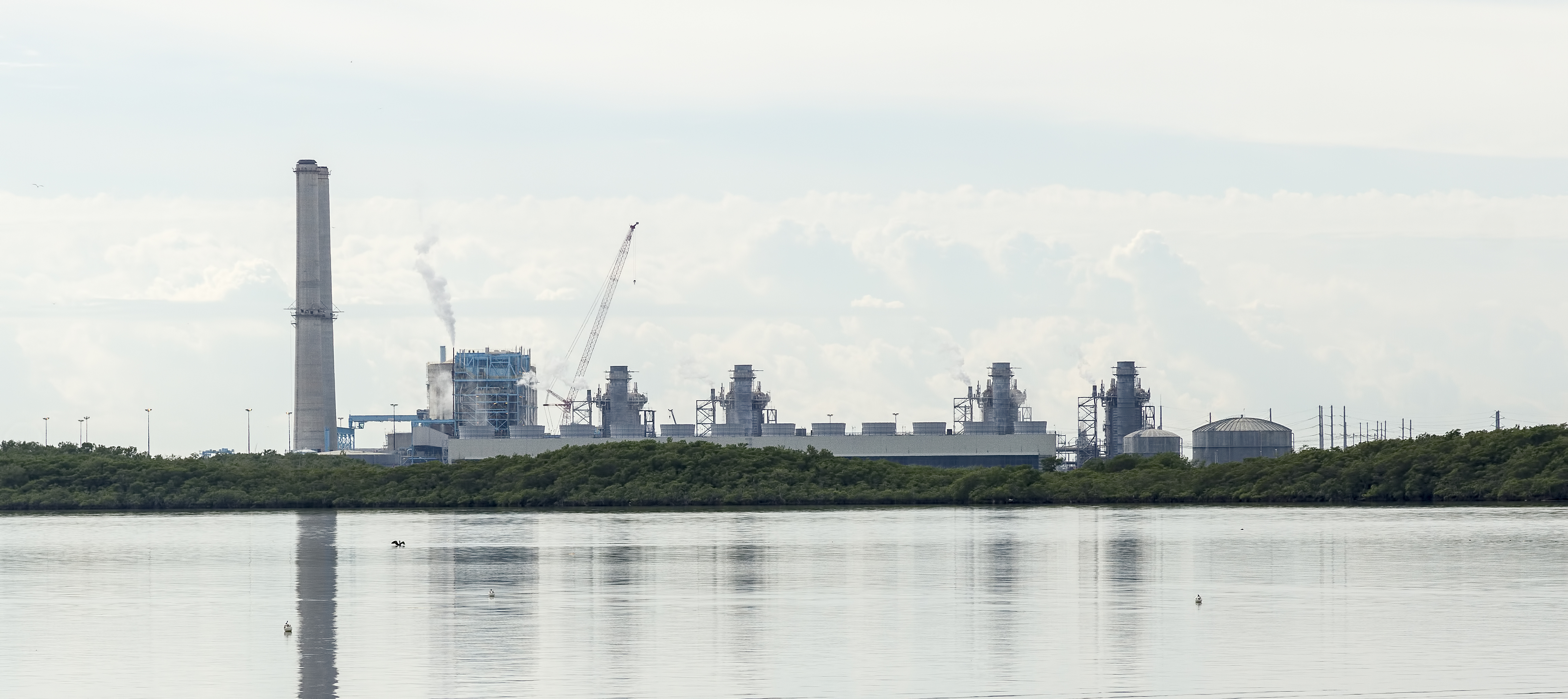
Turkey Point Generating Station from the Biscayne National Park visitor center

On February 26, 2008, both reactors were shut down due to the loss of off-site power during a widespread power outage in South Florida, affecting 700,000 customers.

The fire occurred at 1:08 PM and caused an automatic shutdown of the power plant. This led to a domino effect that caused outages as far north as Daytona Beach and Tampa. Power was restored by 4:30 PM. The reason this malfunction caused such widespread outages was still under investigation a few days later. Walt Disney World Resort, Orlando International Airport, and Miami International Airport were among the places affected by the outage. At least 2.5 million people were without power.

The blackout was initially caused by an overheated voltage switch that soon caught fire at a power substation in Miami, 23 miles (37 km) away from the plant. Although the substation had protective relays to isolate the electrical fault from the broader transmission system, a local engineer was troubleshooting a failure within the substation at the time of the blackout, and had temporarily disabled the protection systems contrary to Florida Power & Light policy. Additional layers of protection eventually removed the substation from service, but required 1.7 s to do so. The long fault duration caused substantial power swings, and many generators tripped off-line to protect themselves from damage; Turkey Point was one such.

David Hoffman, a nuclear supervisor at Turkey Point, resigned over the incident and was subsequently sued by Florida Power and Light for return of a bonus. Hoffman countersued, claiming he was pressured to restart the reactors while they were in a condition which in his judgment made it unsafe to do so. Upper management wanted the reactors restarted during xenon dead time, which would have led to the operators at the controls having to continuously step control rods to safely manage reactor output. Florida Power and Light responded to the allegation, claiming Hoffman's suit was "self-motivated".

== Ecology ==
The site is home to a large wildlife preserve.

Turkey Point has been a contributing force to the reclassification of the American crocodile from endangered to the less serious category of vulnerable, due to the habit and nesting grounds created in the cooling canals.

=== Cooling canals ===
Instead of a cooling tower, the plant has a large five-by-two mile (10 sq mi or 26 km^{2}) network of canals covering nearly 6,000 acres (2,400 ha). Several problems have arisen from this, including pollution of nearby national parks or water supply, particularly the Biscayne Aquifer, issues with overheating, and radioactive material. Overheating in the canals twice caused the plant to shut down reactors in 2014. In September 2016, a controversial cleanup process began that included injecting hypersaline water deep into the boulder zone beneath the aquifer and/or making some of the unlined canals more shallow. Six hundred thousand pounds (270,000 kg) of salt gets into the canal system daily, and the saltwater contamination reaches four miles (6.4 km) west of the system, possibly as far as Biscayne Bay.

== Seismic risk ==
The Nuclear Regulatory Commission's estimate of the risk each year of an earthquake intense enough to cause core damage to the reactor at Turkey Point was 1 in 100,000, according to an NRC study published in August 2010. The plant is located in an area with the lowest earthquake hazard potential described by the USGS.

== Reactor data ==
The Turkey Point Nuclear Generating Station consists of two operational reactors, and two additional units are planned.

Reactor unit	Reactor type	Capacity(MW)		Construction started	Electricity grid connection	Commercial operation	Shutdown
Reactor unit	Reactor type	Net	Gross	Construction started	Electricity grid connection	Commercial operation	Shutdown
Turkey Point-3	Westinghouse 3-loop	693	729	27.04.1967	02.11.1972	14.12.1972	
Turkey Point-4	Westinghouse 3-loop	693	729	27.04.1967	21.06.1973	07.09.1973	
Turkey Point-6 (planned)	AP1000	1117	-	Licensed			
Turkey Point-7 (planned)	AP1000	1117	-	Licensed			

In 2019 the Nuclear Regulatory Commission (NRC) approved a second 20-year licence extension for units 3 and 4, the first time NRC had extended licences to an 80-year total lifetime.

== Name ==
Speculation about the name Turkey Point, first known written reference in 1865, suggests that it is because of the presence of the anhinga.

== See also ==
- List of largest power stations in the United States
- List of power stations in Florida
