= JEA =

Utility company in Florida, United States

JEA, Inc.

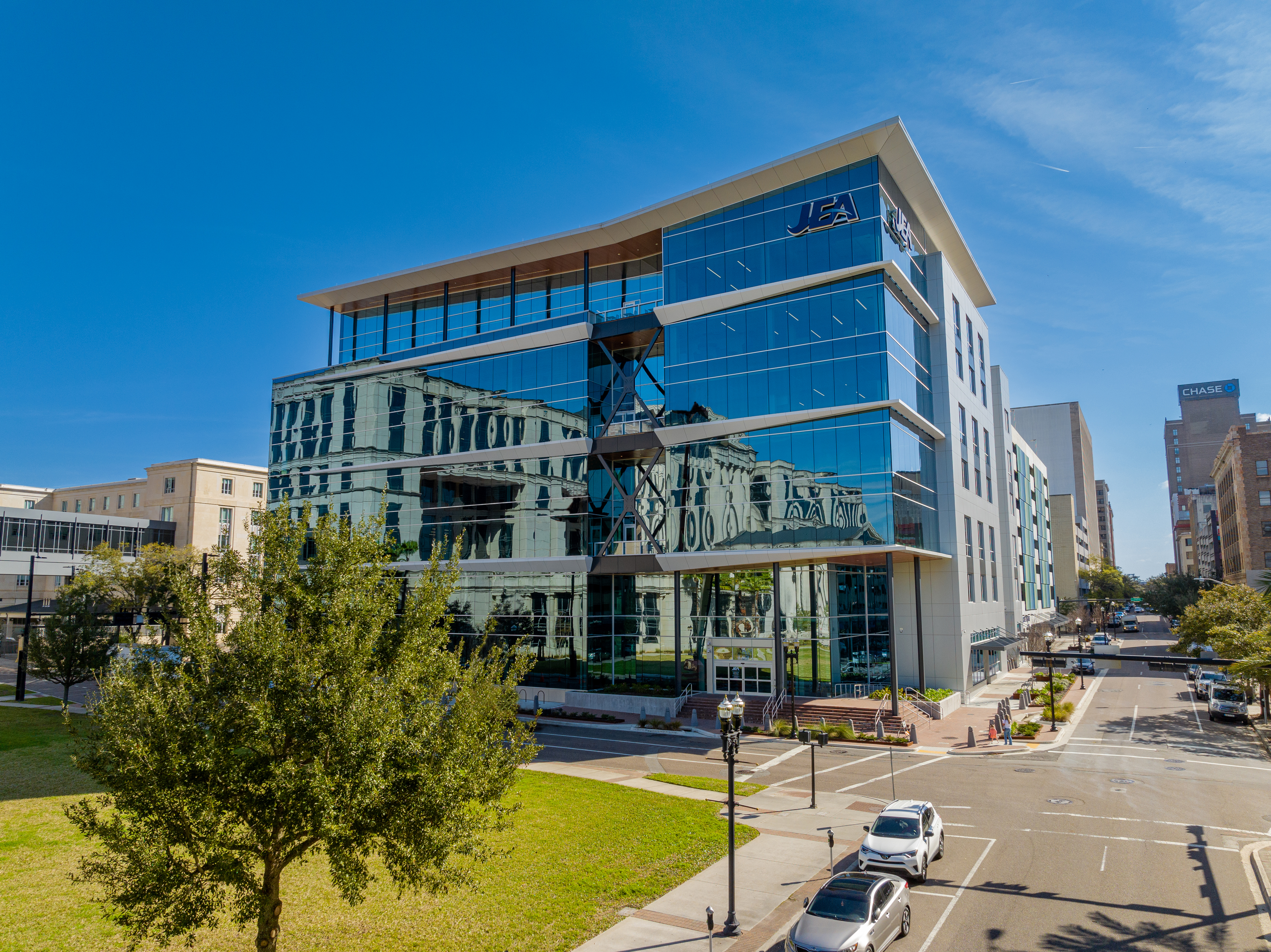
- Old Headquarters in the Northbank area of Downtown Jacksonville
- Type: Public-benefit
- Industry: Public Utility
- Predecessor: City of Jacksonville Electric Department (electricity, prior to 1968); Department of Public Utilities (water and sewer, prior to 1997); Jacksonville Electric Authority
- Founded: 1895
- Headquarters: 225 North Pearl Street, Jacksonville, Florida, US
- Key people: Vickie Cavey, CEO and MD
- Products: Electric utility Drinking water Sewage treatment Chilled water Reclaimed water
- Total assets: $7.9 billion (2021)
- Total equity: $3.5 billion (2021)
- Number of employees: 2,200+ approximate (2025)
- Website: jea.com

JEA, located in Jacksonville, Florida, is the eighth-largest community-owned electric utility company in the United States and the largest in Florida. As of 2022, JEA served more than 1 million Northeast Florida residents with electric, water, sewer and reclaimed water services. JEA also provides some customers with natural gas sales, and access to dark fiber. In addition, JEA works with the City of Jacksonville to maintain its streetlight system. Besides Jacksonville (Duval County), JEA also serves customers in Clay, Nassau and St. Johns counties.

== History ==
Jacksonville's water and sewer systems have been operated by the city since 1880.

=== City of Jacksonville Electric Department ===
The first electric power station, Main Street Power Plant, came online in 1895 and provided night-time lighting for the first time to downtown.

The Baldwin Interconnector came online in 1943, providing backup power to nearby Naval Air Station Jacksonville and Camp Blanding.

The Southside Generating Station came online in 1950, and is hooked up to the city's electric grid.

Hurricane Dora devastated 95 percent of the city's electric grid on September 9, 1964.

=== JEA History ===
As part of the consolidation of the City of Jacksonville and Duval County governments in 1967, the City of Jacksonville Electric Department became an independent body, renamed Jacksonville Electric Authority, operating in accordance with Article 21 of the Jacksonville Code of Ordinance.

According to Article 21 of the Jacksonville City Charter,

"JEA is authorized to own, manage and operate a utilities system within and outside the City of Jacksonville. JEA is created for the express purpose of acquiring, constructing, operating, financing and otherwise have plenary authority with respect to electric, water, sewer, natural gas and such other utility systems as may be under its control now or in the future."

During the 1970s, JEAs electric rates were among the highest in the nation. Royce Lyles became JEA Managing Director on September 1, 1979 and the utility began diversifying its fuel mix. Rates began to drop, eventually becoming the lowest in the state and near the bottom in the Southeast.

Walt Bussells was appointed Managing Director on September 8, 1995, following Royce Lyles' retirement.

On June 1, 1997, Jacksonville's Department of Public Utilities, water and sewer operations merged into the Jacksonville Electric Authority. The utility subsequently became known as JEA as it provided a broader range of services beyond electric service.

Bussells embraced new technology and in 2002, JEA introduced online bill payment and implemented network meter reading. In 2003, JEA’s first chilled water facility became fully operational and began providing chilled water for air conditioning in downtown buildings. Since then, JEA has completed three additional facilities and has contracts to provide sixteen (16) locations with chilled water. Chilled water clients include Vystar Veterans Arena, 121 Financial Ballpark, Downtown Public Library, State Attorney Office, Duval County Courthouse and UF Health Hospital Campus, among others.

During Bussells's tenure, Jacksonville's electric rates had remained artificially low throughout the 1990s and into the 2000s, despite large expenditures following the water/sewer acquisition in 1997, technology improvements, and construction of chilled water equipment. These projects were financed with borrowed money.

Jim Dickenson replaced Walt Bussells when Bussells retired on June 15, 2004 after nine years as CEO. Soon after taking over, Dickenson implemented the first of three temporary fuel rate increases to offset rising fuel costs. In 2007, JEA had the second-lowest electric rates in Florida before they announced a four-year base rate increase package that would raise the average bill from $112 to more than $140 in 2010. The additional revenue was designed to reduce debt.

The utility's debt in 2010 was $6.0 billion, against assets of $7.5 billion. Compared to other similar sized municipal utilities, JEA had 60% more debt per customer, which could lower the utility's bond rating and make it more expensive and difficult to borrow money.

In early 2012, Dickenson announced that he would retire February 1, 2013. On September 7, 2012 JEA Board of Directors named Paul McElroy to fill the role of JEA CEO and Managing Director effective October 1, 2012.

In October 2012, Paul McElroy signed a 3-year contract to serve as JEA's CEO and this contract has been extended once; it ends in September 2018.

Aaron Zahn served as CEO from April 2018 until his termination on Jan. 28, 2020.

COO Melissa Dykes was elevated to Managing Director & CEO on an interim basis until May 5, 2020, when Paul McElroy returned to lead JEA until a permanent replacement was selected. In June 2020, McElroy placed the majority of the leadership team that served under Zahn on paid administrative leave and appointed interim leaders.

Jay Stowe was named Managing Director & CEO in November 2020. Stowe’s new seven-member leadership team was in place by September 2021. The decision was made to leave the 19-story JEA tower and customer center, built in 1963, due to rising cost of repairs and maintenance. Renovation was rejected as too expensive and there was inadequate parking available.

JEA needed less than half the space of the Downtown Center, so it consolidated operations in a leased, seven-story glass front building at 225 N. Pearl Street in April 2023. JEA provides vouchers for customer parking at the Duval County Courthouse Garage across the street.

Following Stowe's resignation in April 2024, JEA veteran Vickie Cavey was named Interim Managing Director & CEO, and she was elevated to the permanent role in September 2024. After a successful year in the position, her salary was elevated from $560,000 to $700,000 annually.

In February 2025, the company announced that they were accepting bids for redevelopment of the vacant buildings at their former headquarters.

=== Attempted sale and aftermath ===
In early 2018, JEA's board of directors became interested in potentially selling the publicly owned JEA.

In late December 2019, a state investigation of JEA's CEO and board of directors launched in response to complaints to the previously mentioned selling of JEA. The State Attorney's Office turned over its investigation to the U.S. Attorney and the FBI, resulting in a federal grand jury indicting former CEO Zahn and former CFO Ryan Wannemacher on charges of conspiracy and wire fraud in 2022. Following a trial, Zahn was found guilty of both charges in March 2024 and sentenced to four years in prison, while Wannemacher was found not guilty on both counts.

== Services ==
- Electricity: JEA owns/operates four generating plants and all transmission and distribution facilities; JEA previously co-owned two additional power plants with Florida Power & Light: the St. Johns River Power Park in northeastern Jacksonville and Unit 4 of Plant Scherer, near Macon, Georgia, both retired on 1/1/2018 and 1/1/2022, respectively.
- Water: 134 artesian wells tapping the Floridan Aquifer are distributed through 35 water treatment plants and 4,208 miles (6,772 km) of water lines.
- Sewer: 3,760 miles (6,050 km) of collection lines and seven regional and eight non-regional sewage treatment plants.
- Chilled water: the company owns one chiller plant in downtown Jacksonville which provides the commodity to nearby facilities to heat and cool their buildings' air and equipment.

== See also ==
- JEA Northside Generating Station
- List of power stations in Florida
