= Fort Myers Power Plant =

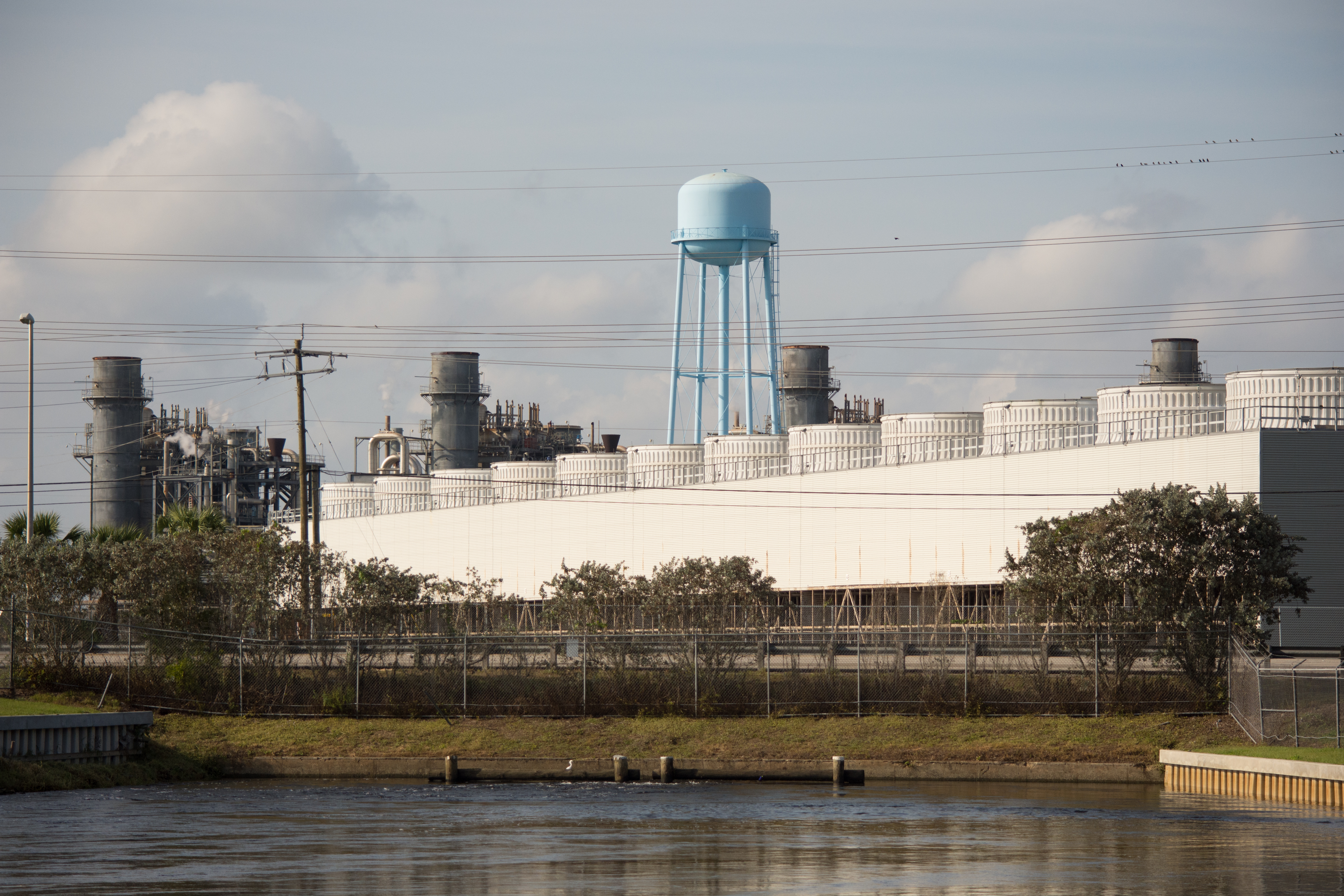
- Country: United States
- Location: Lee County, Florida
- Coordinates: 26°41′48″N 81°46′57″W
- Status: Operational
- Commission date: Unit 1: May 1974; Unit 2: June 2002; Unit 3: June 2003; Unit 9: May 1974
- Owner: Florida Power & Light
- Operator: Florida Power & Light

Thermal power station
- Primary fuel: Natural gas
- Secondary fuel: Fuel oil
- Turbine technology: General Electric Axial Flow Combustion Turbines and expansion steam turbines.
- Cooling source: closed loop cooling via radiators and electric fans
- Combined cycle?: Yes

Power generation
- Units operational: 1 × 1,722.5 MW; 1 × 835.4 MW; 2 x 62 MW (Fuel oil)
- Nameplate capacity: 2,680.9 MW

The Fort Myers Power Plant is a natural gas and fuel oil-fired power station located in Lee County, Florida. The power station is composed of eight GE 7000F combined cycle natural gas-fired units (Blocks 2 and 3) and two fuel oil-fired units (Units 1 and 9), totalling an installed capacity of 2,608.9 MW. It is the third largest power station in Florida by installed capacity.

== See also ==
- List of largest power stations in the United States
- List of power stations in Florida
