= List of decommissioned coal-fired power stations in the United States =

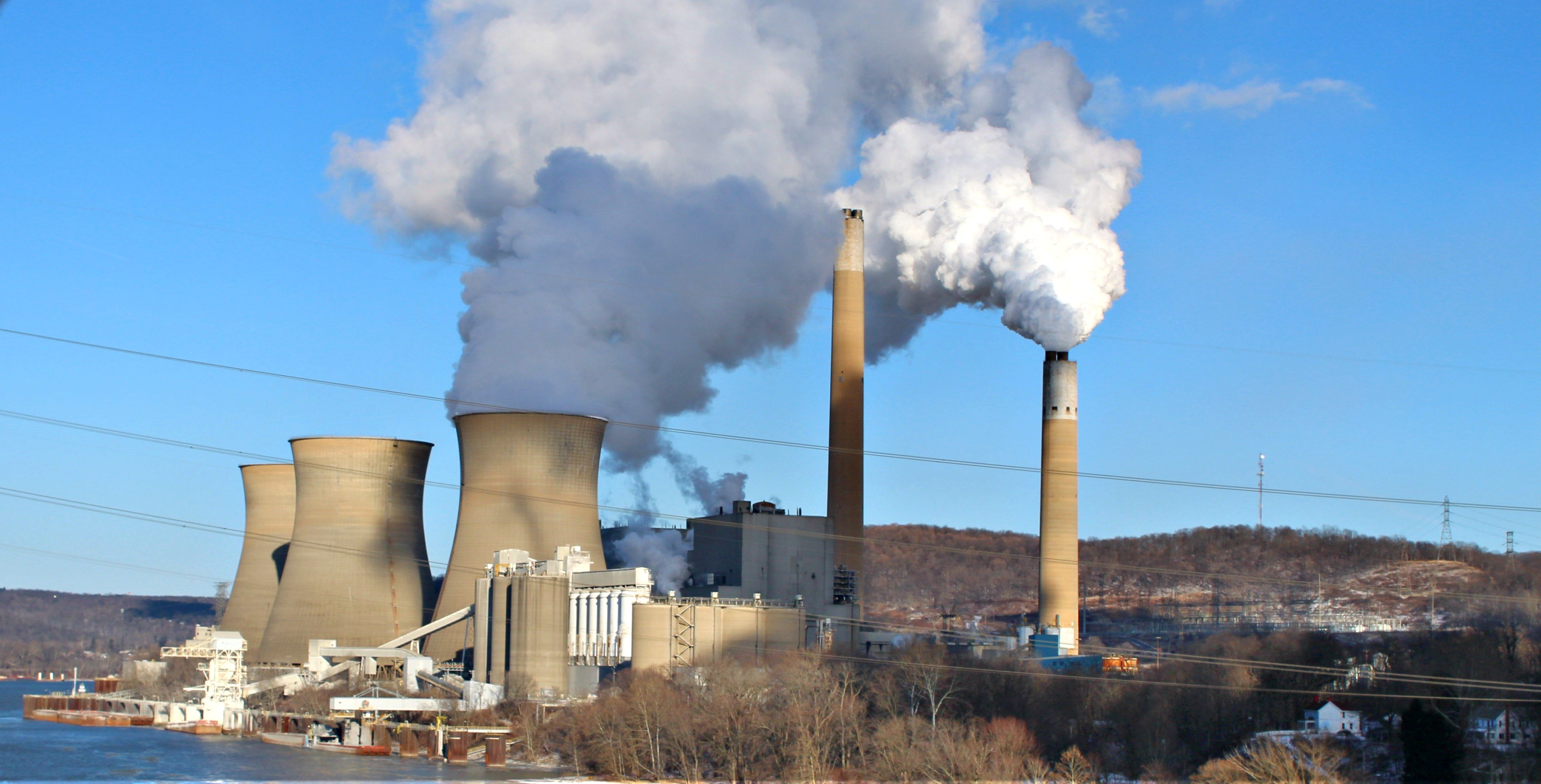
Bruce Mansfield Power Plant, at a capacity of 2,490 MW, is the largest power plant to be decommissioned in the United States.

This is an incomplete list of decommissioned coal-fired power stations in the United States. Coal plants have been closing at a fast rate since 2010 (290 plants closed from 2010 to May 2019; this was 40% of the US's coal generating capacity) due to competition from other generating sources, primarily cheaper and cleaner natural gas (a result of the fracking boom), which has replaced so many coal plants that natural gas now accounts for 40% of the US's total electricity generation, as well as the decrease in the cost of renewables. Some coal-fired power stations listed are not fully decommissioned but have converted to other fuel sources.

== Decommissioned coal-fired power stations ==
Name	State	Location	Capacity(MW)	Capacity Factor	Annual Generation (GWh)	CO_{2} emissions (Tons/year)	CO_{2} emissions/ Annual Generation	Majority Owner	Fuel type	Retired	Ref
Armstrong	Pennsylvania	40°55′45″N 79°27′59″W	356					FirstEnergy	Bituminous coal	September 1, 2012	
Asbury	Missouri	37°21′41″N 94°35′21″W	232					Empire District Electric Company		March 2020	
Birchwood	Virginia	38°15′56″N 77°18′51″W	258		77 (2020)	65,032 (2019)	1355 (2019)	J-POWER General Electric	Bituminous coal	March 2021	
Boardman	Oregon	45°41′36″N 119°48′25″W	550					Portland General Electric		October 2020	
Brayton Point (Note: Last coal-fired power station in Massachusetts to provide power to the regional grid)	Massachusetts	41°42′45″N 71°11′38″W	1537.6					PG&E (1963-2005); Dominion Energy New England (2005-2013); Energy Capital Partners (2013-2015); Dynegy (2015-present)	Bituminous coal	October 2020	
Bridgeport	Connecticut	41°10′17″N 73°11′03″W	995		2,100 (2019)	806,838 (2019)	384 (2019)	Public Service Enterprise Group	Sub-bituminous coal	June 2021	
Bruce Mansfield	Pennsylvania	40°38′4″N 80°25′1″W	2,490					FirstEnergy		November 2019	
Bull Run	Tennessee	36°01′16″N 84°09′22″W	889		641 (2020)	1,337,090 (2019)	862 (2019)	Tennessee Valley Authority	Bituminous coal	December 2023	
Burlington	Iowa	40°44′28″N 91°07′00″W	212		1,130 (2020)	1,194,481 (2019)	1042 (2019)	Interstate Power and Light	Sub-bituminous coal	December 2021	
Carbon Power Plant (Note: Alternate Name: Castle Gate Power Plant)	Utah	39°43′38″N 110°51′51″W	190					PacifiCorp	Sub-bituminous coal	April 16, 2015	
Charles P. Crane	Maryland	39°19′25″N 76°21′59″W	400					Avenue Capital Group	Sub-bituminous coal	June 2018	
Charles R. Lowman	Alabama	31°29′17″N 87°54′38″W	538					PowerSouth Energy Cooperative	Bituminous coal	October 2020	
Cheswick	Pennsylvania	40°32′18″N 79°47′29″W	635		542 (2020)	896,561 (2019)	1135 (2019)	GenOn Energy Holdings	Bituminous coal	April 2022	
Dan E. Karn	Michigan	43°38′32″N 83°50′17″W	544		1,654 (2020)	1,934,954 (2019)	1,063 (2019)	CMS Energy	Sub-bituminous coal	June 2023	
Dolet Hills	Louisiana	32°1′56″N 93°34′10″W	720					SWEPCO; Cleco Power LLC; Northeast Texas Electric Cooperative Inc	Lignite	October 2021	
Eckert	Michigan	42°41′42″N 84°39′43″W	375		384 (2018); 44 (2019); 5 (2020)	484,156 (2018); 46,403 (2019)		Lansing Board of Water and Light	Sub-bituminous coal	April 2021	
Elk River	Minnesota	45°17′43″N 93°33′24″W	35 to 42					Great River Energy	Sub-bituminous coal Oil; Refuse Derived Fuel (Note: Built as a coal and oil-fired facility in 1950; Operated from July 1, 1964 until February 1, 1968 on nuclear power Resumed operating on coal and oil in 1968; Converted in 1989 to use Refuse Derived Fuel (RDF))	January 2019	
Erickson	Michigan	42°41′33″N 84°39′27″W	155		691 (2019)	765,200 (2019)	1,107 (2019)	Lansing Board of Water & Light	Sub-bituminous coal	November 2022	
Escalante	New Mexico	35°24′58″N 108°05′00″W	257		1,209 (2019)	1,292,447 (2018)		TSGTA	Sub-bituminous coal	December 2020	
Frank E. Ratts	Indiana	38°31′12″N 87°16′02″W	250					Hoosier Energy	Sub-bituminous coal	December 29, 2014	
G. G. Allen	North Carolina	35°11′25″N 81°0′30″W	868		895 (2019)	974,310 (2019)	1,089 (2019)	Duke Energy	Bituminous coal	December 2024	
George F. Weaton	Pennsylvania	40°40′2.24″N 80°20′46.03″W	110					Horsehead Corporation	Sub-bituminous coal	July 2012	
Grainger	South Carolina	33°49′33″N 79°03′10″W	170					Central Electric Power Cooperative	Bituminous coal	October 2012	
Harding Street	Indiana	39°42′34″N 86°11′48″W	698					AES Indiana	Bituminous coal	2016	
Harllee Branch	Georgia	33°11′38″N 83°17′59″W	1,539					Georgia Power	Bituminous coal	April 2015	
Hatfield's Ferry	Pennsylvania	39°51′20″N 79°55′39″W	1700					FirstEnergy	Bituminous coal	October 9, 2013	
Henderson Station One (Note: Alternate Name: HMP&L One)	Kentucky	37.84°N 87.59°W	44					City of Henderson	Coal	December 31, 2008	
Henderson Station Two (Note: Alternate Name: William L Newman Power Station)	Kentucky	37.646678°N 87.501403°W	405					Henderson City Utility Commission	Bituminous coal	May 2019	
Homer City	Pennsylvania	40°30′39″N 79°11′37″W	2,022	29%	6,828 (2019)	6,753,709 (2019)	989 2019	NRG Energy	Bituminous coal	July 2023	
Hoot Lake	Minnesota	46°17′27″N 96°02′35″W	129		319 (2019)	356,720 (2019)	1118 (2019)	Otter Tail Power Company	Sub-bituminous coal	June 2021	
Indian River	Delaware	38°35′08″N 75°14′05″W	446		121 (2019)	207,103 (2019)	1,712 (2019)	NRG Energy	Bituminous coal	February 2025	
J.M. Stuart	Ohio	38°38′16″N 83°41′35″W	2,318					Dynegy (39%)		May 2018	
Johnsonville	Tennessee	36°1′40″N 87°59′12″W	1,500					Tennessee Valley Authority		December 2017	
Kenneth C. Coleman	Kentucky	37.9625°N 86.7917°W	521					Big Rivers Electric Corporation	Coal	September 2020	
Kintigh (Note: Last coal-fired power plant in New York) (Note: Alternate Name: Somerset Operating Co. LLC of the Upstate New York Power Producers)	New York	43°21′29″N 78°36′14″W	675					AES Corporation	Bituminous coal	March 31, 2020	
Lewis & Clark	Montana	47°40′44″N 104°09′27″W	50		263 (2019)	314,567 (2018)		Montana-Dakota Utilities	Lignite	March 2021	
Martin Drake	Colorado	38°49′27″N 104°49′53″W	207		740 (2019)	1,046,153 (2018)		City of Colorado Springs	Sub-bituminous coal	August 2021	
Mohave	Nevada	35°8′42″N 114°35′19″W	1,636					Southern California Edison	Bituminous coal	2005	
Merrimack (Note: Peaking plant and last coal-fired power plant in New England)	New Hampshire	43°08′29″N 71°28′07″W	496		302 (2019)	264,399 (2018)		Granite Shore Power	Bituminous coal	September 2025	
Monticello	Texas	33°5′28″N 95°2′17″W	1,880					Luminant		January 2018	
Muskingum River	Ohio	39°35′18″N 81°40′57″W	1,529					American Electric Power	Bituminous coal	May 2015	
Navajo	Arizona; Navajo Nation	36°54′12″N 111°23′25″W	2,250					U.S. Bureau of Reclamation (24.3%)	Bituminous coal	November 2019	
Pleasant Prairie	Wisconsin	42°32′17″N 87°54′17″W	1,210			8.6 million (2018)		WE energies	Coal	April 2018	
R. Gallagher	Indiana	38°15′49″N 85°50′16″W	280		285 (2018)	349,403 (2018)		Duke Energy	Bituminous coal	June 2021	
R. M. Heskett	North Dakota	46°52′01″N 100°53′02″W	100		439 (2019)	645,998 (2018)		Montana-Dakota Utilities	Lignite	March 2022	
River Rouge	Michigan	42°16′14″N 83°07′29″W	651		624 (2019)	690,194 (2018)		Detroit Edison	Sub-bituminous coal	May 2021	
Rivesville	West Virginia	39°31′53″N 80°06′45″W	109.8					Monongahela Power Co	Bituminous coal	2012	
Roanoke Valley	North Carolina	36°26′13″N 77°36′58″W	240.1					Westmoreland Partners LLC	Bituminous coal	2017	
Rush Island	Missouri	38°07′52″N 90°15′46″W	1,242		5,545 (2019)	7,206,695 (2018)		Ameren	Refined coal	October 2024	
Russell	New York	43°15′56″N 77°38′01″W	252.6					Rochester Gas & Electric Corp	Coal (unknown)	2009	
Sammis	Ohio	40°31′45″N 80°37′55″W	2435.6					Energy Harbor Generation LLC	Bituminous coal	2023	
San Juan	New Mexico	36°48′06″N 108°26′19″W	847	30%	4,716 (2019)	4,929,343 (2018)		PNM Resources	Refined coal	September 2022	
Sandow	Texas	30°34′02″N 70°47′03″W	1615.1					Luminant Generation Company LLC	Lignite	2018	
Schiller	New Hampshire	43°05′48″N 70°47′03″W	185					Energy Trading Innovations LLC	Bituminous coal	2025	
Scholz	Florida	30°40′09″N 84°53′16″W	98					NextEra Energy Inc	Bituminous coal	2015	
Shiras	Michigan	46°31′52″N 87°23′31″W	44					City of Marquette (Michigan)	Bituminous coal	April 2019	
Sibley	Missouri	39°10′43″N 94°11′03″W	504					Evergy Inc	Bituminous coal	2018	
Sims	Michigan	43°04′16″N 86°14′02″W	80					Grand Haven Board of Power and Light	Bituminous coal	February 2020	
Silver Lake	Minnesota	44°01′42″N 92°27′37″W	54					Rochester Public Utilities	Coal	2015	
Somerset (Massachusetts)	Massachusetts	41°44′15″N 71°08′45″W	173.7					Somerset Power LLC	Bituminous coal	2011	
Somerset (New York)	New York	43°21′23″N 78°36′13″W	685					Riesling Power LLC	Bituminous coal	2020	
Southampton	Virginia	36°39′08″N 76°59′42″W	71.1					Virginia Electric and Power	Coal (unknown)	2013	
Spiritwood Industrial Park	North Dakota	46°55′32″N 98°30′08″W	106.2					Great River Energy Cooperative	Lignite	2022	
St. Clair	Michigan	42°45′51″N 82°28′18″W	1551					DTE Energy Co	Bituminous coal Sub-bituminous coal	May 2022	
St. Johns River	Florida	30°25′51″N 81°33′03″W	1358					JEA	Bituminous coal	January 8, 2018	
Stanton	North Dakota	47°17′10″N 101°19′55″W	190.2					Great River Energy Cooperative	Sub-bituminous coal	2017	
State Line	Indiana	41°42′27″N 87°31′16″W	614					BTU Solutions	Bituminous coal	March 31, 2012	
Stoneman (Note: Alternate Name: E.J. Stoneman Power Plant.)	Wisconsin	42°42′28″N 90°59′03″W	35					DTE Energy Services	Coal; Biomass	2015	
Streeter	Iowa	42°31′37″N 92°26′21″W	35					Cedar Falls Utilities	Coal	2016	
Stuart (Note: Alternate Name: JM Stuart power station)	Ohio	38°38′10″N 83°41′38″W	2440.8					AES Ohio LLC	Bituminous coal	2018	
Sunbury	Pennsylvania	40°50′17″N 76°49′28″W	437.9					Sunbury Generation LP	Anthracite	2014	
Sutherland	Iowa	42°02′51″N 92°51′35″W	157					Interstate Power and Light Co	Sub-bituminous coal	2016	
Sutton Steam Plant	North Carolina	34°16′58″N 77°59′11″W	671.6					Duke Energy Progress LLC	Bituminous coal	2013	
Taconite Harbor	Minnesota	47°31′52″N 90°54′42″W	252					ALLETE Inc	Bituminous coal	2023	
Tanner's Creek	Indiana	39°04′53″N 84°51′39″W	995					Indiana Michigan Power	Bituminous coal	May 31, 2015	
Tecumseh	Kansas	39°03′13″N 95°34′07″W	231.6					Evergy Kansas Central Inc	Sub-bituminous coal	2018	
Titus	Pennsylvania	40°18′19″N 75°54′31″W	225					GenOn Holdings Inc	Bituminous coal	2013	
Tobaccoville	North Carolina	36°15′04″N 80°22′01″W	80					Reynolds American Inc	Coal	2004	
Trigen Syracuse (Note: Alternate Name: Syracuse Energy power station.)	New York	43°03′55″N 76°12′30″W	90.6					Dynegy Generation NA Inc	Bituminous coal	2013	
Tyrone	Kentucky	38°02′50″N 84°50′53″W	75					Kentucky Utilities Co	Bituminous coal	2013	
Utah Smelter (Note: Alternate Names: KUC Plant power station, KUCC power station)	Utah	40°43′18″N 112°11′53″W	132					Kennecott Utah Copper LLC	Bituminous coal	2019	
Vermilion	Illinois	40.178055°N 87.748055°W	182.3					Dynegy Midwest Generation Inc	Bituminous coal	2011	
W. H. Sammis	Ohio	40°31′48″N 80°37′51″W	2,220		3,957 (2019)			Energy Harbor	Bituminous coal	June 2023 (units 5–7)	
Wabash (Note: Alternate Names: Wabash River Highland Plant, Wabash River IGCC GT1 (Platts) (Unit 1A))	Indiana	39°31′39″N 87°25′23″W	1164.7					Wabash Valley Power Association Inc; Duke Energy Indiana LLC	Bituminous coal (Note: Unit 8 (165MW) is still operational on-site, built to burn natural gas in 2017 and is not a coal conversion)	2016	
Wansley	Georgia	33°24′22″N 85°2′17″W	1,904	17%	2,791 (2018)	2,704,960 (2018)		Southern Power	Bituminous coal	2022	
Warrior Run	Maryland	39°35′46″N 78°44′46″W	205					AES Corporation	Bituminous coal	June 2024	
Warren	Pennsylvania	41°50′09″N 79°11′19″W	84					GenOn Holdings Inc	Bituminous coal (Note: Unit 3 is still operational, built to burn natural gas, fuel oil in 1972 and is not a coal conversion)	2002	
Watts Bar	Tennessee	35.610778°N 84.782167°W	240					Tennessee Valley Authority	Bituminous coal	2011	
Waukegan	Illinois	42°22′58″N 87°49′13″W	681		1,194 (2019)	1,718,814 (2018)		NRG Energy	Sub-bituminous coal	June 2022	
Weadock (Note: Alternate Name: JC Weadock power station)	Michigan	43°38′29″N 83°50′34″W	312.6					The Vanguard Group Inc	Bituminous coal	2016	
Weatherspoon (Note: Alternate Name: WH Weatherspoon power station)	North Carolina	34°35′22″N 78°58′32″W	165.5					Duke Energy Progress LLC	Bituminous coal	2011	
Whiting (Note: Alternate Name: JR Whiting power station)	Michigan	41°47′31″N 83°26′57″W	345.4					Consumers Energy Co.	Bituminous coal	April 2016	
Widows Creek	Alabama	34°53′08″N 85°45′03″W	1968.6					Tennessee Valley Authority	Bituminous coal	September 2015	
Will County	Illinois	41°37′59″N 88°03′43″W	1268.8					NRG Energy	Sub-bituminous coal	June 2022	
William H. Zimmer	Ohio	38°51′59″N 84°13′41″W	1,351					Vistra Corp	Coal	May 2022	
Willow Island	West Virginia	39°22′03″N 81°17′43″W	213.2					FirstEnergy	Bituminous coal	2012	

== Decommissioned coal-fired power stations converted to other fuel sources ==
Name	State	Location	Capacity(MW)	Capacity Factor	Annual Generation (GWh)	CO_{2} emissions (Tons/year)	CO_{2} emissions/ Annual Generation	Majority Owner	Former Fuel Type	New Fuel Type	Conversion Date	Ref
Amalgamated Sugar Twin Falls	Idaho	42°31′55″N 114°25′55″W	10.2		52 (2019)	224,652 (2019)	4,320 (2019)	Amalgamated Sugar Company	Bituminous coal	Natural gas	January 2021(Units 1500 & 2500) April 2023 (Unit 4000)	
Archer Daniels Midland Des Moines	Iowa	41°37′34.0″N 93°34′59.7″W	7.9		25 (2019)	122,310 (2019)	4,892 (2019)	Archer Daniels Midland	Sub-bituminous coal	Natural gas	February 2025	
Archer Daniels Midland Lincoln	Nebraska	40°51′59″N 96°36′53″W	7.9		27 (2019)			Archer Daniels Midland	Sub-bituminous coal	Natural gas	February 2025	
Bailly	Indiana	41°38′36″N 87°07′22″W	604					Northern Indiana Public Service Company (NIPSCO)	Bituminous coal	Natural gas	May 31, 2018	
Big Sandy	Kentucky	38°10′20″N 82°37′03″W	1097					Kentucky Power Company	Bituminous coal	Natural gas	May 30, 2016	
Cane Run	Kentucky	38°10′36.03″N 85°53′28.07″W	640					Louisville Gas and Electric	Bituminous coal	Natural gas	June 2015	
Colbert Fossil Plant (Note: Renamed Colbert Combustion Turbine Plant when converted to natural gas in March 2016)	Alabama	34°44′27″N 87°50′56″W	1350					Louisville Gas and Electric	Bituminous coal	Natural gas	March 23, 2016	
Crist (Note: Renamed Gulf Clean Energy Center when converted to natural gas in January 2021)	Florida	30°33′55″N 87°13′33″W	1,135		1,100 (2020)	2,604,934 (2019)	976 (2019)	Gulf Power Company	Bituminous coal	Natural gas	2021	
Herbert A. Wagner	Maryland	39°10′43″N 76°31′37″W	1,040		159 (2019)	211,687 (2019)	1,331 (2019)	Talen Energy	Bituminous coal	Petroleum Liquids	March 2024	
Ingredion Incorporated	Illinois	41°46′40″N 87°49′27″W	45		242 (2019)	693,731 (2019)	2,867 (2019)	Ingredion Incorporated	Bituminous coal	Natural gas	August 2022	
Intermountain Power Plant	Utah	39°30′27″N 112°34′49″W	840					Intermountain Power Agency	Coal	Green Hydrogen and Natural Gas	2026	
Iowa State University	Iowa	42°01′40″N 93°38′24″W	46		107 (2019)			Iowa State University	Bituminous coal, natural gas	Natural gas	December 2020	
Mount Tom	Massachusetts	42°16′52″N 72°36′18″W	136					Firstlight Power Resources Inc	Bituminous coal	Solar (5.76 MW); Battery Storage (3 - 5 MW)	March 23, 2016	
North Valmy	Nevada	40°52′50″N 117°09′08″W	567	14% (2017)	1,450 (2018)	1,645,434 (2018)		Sierra Pacific Power	Bituminous coal, sub-bituminous coal	Natural gas	December 2025 (Unit 1), April 2026 (Unit 2),	
Pawnee	Colorado	40°13′11″N 103°40′43″W	505		2,510 (2019)	3,503,839 (2018)		Xcel Energy	Sub-bituminous coal (Unit 1)	Natural Gas	December 31, 2025	
Perry K.	Indiana	39°45′46″N 86°10′01″W	604					Citizens Energy Group	Bituminous coal	Natural gas	2016	
Prairie Creek	Iowa	41°56′39″N 91°38′20″W	213		43 (2019)	198,803 (2018)		Interstate Power and Light	Sub-bituminous coal (Units 1-4)	Natural Gas (Units 3-4), Retired (Units 1-2)	2017 (Unit 4), December 2025(Units 1-3)	
Reid Gardner	Nevada	36.657°N 114.634°W	557					NV Energy; California Department of Water Resources	Bituminous coal	Battery Storage	March 2017	
Robert D. Green	Kentucky	37°38′N 87°30′W	528					Big Rivers Electric Cooperation	Bituminous coal	Natural gas	2022	
Robert Reid	Kentucky	37°38′43″N 87°30′10″W	96					Big Rivers Electric Cooperation	Bituminous coal	Natural gas Fuel oil	2015	
Rumford	Maine	44°33′07″N 70°32′33″W	102.6					ND Paper Inc	Coal (unknown)	Bioenergy: (paper mill wastes); Bioenergy: Wood & other biomass (solids); Bituminous coal (Note: In 2015 the cogeneration unit switched from a coal-fired unit that cofired biomass to a biomass unit that cofires coal); Bioenergy: Wastewater and sewage sludge (solids or biogas); Fossil liquids: unknown	2015	
Shawville	Pennsylvania	41°04′02″N 78°21′55″W	625					Midwood Holdings LLC	Bituminous coal	Natural gas	2016	
Spruance	Virginia	37°27′20″N 77°25′51″W	229.6					Spruance Genco LLC	Bituminous coal	Natural Gas	2019	
Stockton Cogeneration (Note: Alternate Name: Stockton Biomass (Port of Stockton District Energy Facility))	California	37°54′45″N 121°15′41″W	60					DTE Energy Co	Bituminous coal	Wood & other biomass (solids); Natural gas	2012	
Syl Laskin	Minnesota	47°31′48″N 92°09′43″W	116					ALLETE Inc	Sub-bituminous coal	Natural gas	2015	
Trenton Channel	Michigan	42°07′20″N 83°10′52″W	775.5					DTE Electric Co	Sub-bituminous coal	Battery Storage (4-hour 220 MW / 880 MWh)	2022	
Valley	Wisconsin	43°01′49″N 87°55′26″W	272					Wisconsin Electric Power Co	Bituminous coal	Natural gas	2015	
Western Sugar	Nebraska	41°51′32″N 103°38′04″W	5		28 (2019)	194,266 (2018)		Western Sugar Cooperative	Sub-bituminous coal	Natural gas	March 2024	
Wyandotte Municipal Power Plant	Michigan	42.208041°N 83.14538°W	32					Wyandotte Municipal Services Commission	Bituminous coal	Natural gas	2017	

== See also ==
- List of coal-fired power stations in the United States
