= Keystone Generating Station =

Coal-fired power plant in Armstrong County, Pennsylvania

- Location of Keystone Generating Station
- Country: United States
- Location: Plumcreek Township, Armstrong County, Pennsylvania
- Coordinates: 40°39′36″N 79°20′27″W
- Status: Operational
- Commission date: Unit 1: 1967; Unit 2: 1968
- Owners: PSEG: 22.84% ArcLight Capital Partners: 20.91% Reliant Energy: 16% Talen Energy: 12.34% NRG Energy: 3.7% DQE: 2.47%
- Operator: Reliant Energy

Thermal power station
- Primary fuel: Coal

Power generation
- Nameplate capacity: 1,711 MW

The Keystone Generating Station is a 1.71-gigawatt (1,711 MW), coal power plant in Plumcreek Township, Armstrong County, Pennsylvania. Occupying roughly 1,500 acres (610 ha) of land north of the community of Idaho, the plant sits along a bend of the Crooked Creek west of Shelocta.

Built in 1967 and expanded in 1968, the plant has had a number of improvements to reduce the level of environmental pollution, especially measures to cut down acidic emissions of nitrogen and sulphur oxides.

The station was scheduled to close by December 31, 2028 due to environmental protection regulations to reduce the amount of mercury, arsenic, and selenium the plant emits into nearby streams and rivers. However, the plant's operators and the Pennsylvania Department of Environmental Protection negotiated by Democratic Governor Josh Shapiro entered into a proposed consent decree to allow the plant and others in the state to remain in operation through 2032 subject to facility improvements to mitigate the environmental and health harm to the area.

== Technical specifications ==
The facility consists of two steam turbines, which began commercial operation in 1967 and 1968, and four cooling towers.

The main turbines run on steam produced by twin 850 MW boilers, each as tall as a 14-story building. The plant uses in excess of 4 million tons of coal a year.

Each unit is a Westinghouse cross-compound dual steam turbine-generator operating at supercritical steam conditions. At the time Keystone was constructed, Units 1 and 2 were the largest generating units in the world. Keystone was the first plant to be constructed away from a significant source of cooling water. The Keystone Reservoir was constructed on the north branch of Plum Creek, a tributary of Crooked Creek to provide a constant source of cooling water for the plant's thermodynamic cycle year-round.

The plant's steam generators each produce approximately 7 million pounds of steam per hour at 3,800 pounds per square inch (26,000 kPa) and 1,005 degrees Fahrenheit (541 °C) with a single reheat to the same temperature. Each unit has two boiler feed pumps, one of which is run by its own steam turbine, and the other of which is powered via the low-pressure turbine-generator through a fluid coupling (so rpm may be varied to maintain the proper boiler feed-water flow and pressure). An auxiliary boiler provides steam for the feed pump with its own turbine in order to provide flow through the boiler at startup without drawing power off the grid. One of the earlier supercritical plants in the country, the boiler design incorporates an improvement over the first full-scale supercritical units at Eddystone Electric Generating Station near Philadelphia. This improvement is a re-circulation circuit that increases water flow through the water walls surrounding the lower furnace in order to protect them during startup with considerably less flow through the entire boiler, thus saving fuel wasted as boiler flow is bypassed to the condenser during startup.

Since the plant's initial commissioning, several environmental control systems have either been upgraded or installed. These include modifications to the electrostatic precipitators, the addition of an ammonia flue gas conditioning system to improve precipitator performance, and a low nitrogen oxide (NO_{x}) burner system to reduce NO_{x} emissions. A selective catalytic reactor further reduces the NO_{x} emissions. In 2009, a wet flue-gas desulfurization system was put in place to reduce sulfur dioxide and heavy metal emissions. The plant has a continuous emissions monitoring system in the stack which must adhere to accuracy and reliability requirements established by the Pennsylvania Department of Environmental Protection.

A consortium of Mid-Atlantic power companies owns the plant. Public Service Enterprise Group owns a 22.84 percent share, while Reliant Resources operates it.

== Owners ==
An incomplete list of owners includes:

- Public Service Enterprise Group: 22.84% or 391 MW
- ArcLight Capital Partners: 20.91% or 358 MW
- Reliant Energy (operator): 16% or 274 MW
- PPL Corporation: 12.34% or 211 MW
- NRG Energy: 3.7% or 63 MW
- Duquesne Light Company: 2.47% or 42.3 MW (previously owned by Atlantic City Electric)

== Emissions ==
Keystone was outfitted with a wet limestone scrubber system in late 2009 to partially remove heavy metals and sulfur dioxide from the emitted flue gas.

While the plant has had SCR technology in place since 2003 to reduce emissions of nitrogen oxides, after 2010 operation of this equipment during the ozone season (May to September) was severely curtailed. Emission rates for nitrogen oxides during the 2011 and 2012 ozone seasons reverted to essentially what they had been prior to SCR start up in 2003, resulting in the release of approximately 9,000 additional tons of NO_{x} per season over what could have been achieved with full operation of this pollution control technology.

Following the implementation of Pennsylvania’s Reasonably Available Control Technology rule (RACT 2) in 2017 which imposed more stringent emission requirements, NO_{x} emission rates fell that year by 79% from 2011, the year of peak SCR curtailment.

== See also ==
- Conemaugh Generating Station
- List of power stations in Pennsylvania
