= Talen Energy =

Energy company in Texas, US

Talen Energy Corporation
- Type: Public
- Traded as: Nasdaq: TLN; S&P 400 component
- Industry: Energy
- Founded: June 1, 2015; 11 years ago
- Headquarters: Houston, Texas, U.S.
- Key people: Mark "Mac" McFarland (Chief Executive Officer); Terry Nutt (President); Cole Muller (Chief Financial Officer); Dan Kelly (General Counsel and Corporate Secretary)
- Revenue: ▲US$2.58 billion (2025)
- Net income: ▼ −US$219 million (2025)
- Number of employees: 2,000
- Website: talenenergy.com

Talen Energy Corporation is an independent power producer and energy infrastructure company.

== History ==
Talen Energy was founded in 2015. The company was formed when the competitive power generation business of PPL Corporation was spun off and immediately combined with competitive generation businesses owned by private equity firm Riverstone Holdings. Following these transactions, PPL shareholders owned 65% of Talen's common stock and affiliates of Riverstone owned 35%, with shares trading on the NYSE under the symbol "TLN".

On December 6, 2016, Riverstone Holdings completed the purchase of the remaining 65% of Talen's common stock, making it a privately owned company.

On November 10, 2020, Talen announced its commitment to transform for a clean energy future. As part of its transformation announcement Talen noted that it would decarbonize its fleet and invest in developing renewable energy, battery storage and digital infrastructure primarily on owned land within its footprint. It also introduced its "Force for Good" philosophy, which includes maintaining its commitment to the communities in which it operates by converting, rather than retiring, its fossil generation facilities and creating new opportunities for these stakeholders through its transformation.

On May 9, 2022, Talen filed for bankruptcy under Chapter 11 of the U.S. Bankruptcy Code as part of a strategic restructuring transaction aimed at reducing $4.5 billion of debt. Its plan of reorganization was approved by the US Bankruptcy Court for the Southern District of Texas on December 15, 2022. The company completed its restructuring and emerged from bankruptcy on May 17, 2023. Upon its emergence, ownership of Talen Energy was transferred to a majority of its unsecured creditors, which consisted of several large financial institutions. Mark "Mac" McFarland assumed the role of President, CEO, and member of the Board, and a new independent board of directors was seated. In June 2023, Talen announced senior leadership changes, including the appointment of Terry Nutt to the role of chief financial officer and John Wander as General Counsel and Corporate Secretary. On June 23, 2023, Talen Energy Corporation stock began to trade on the OTC Market under the ticker "TLNE".

In March 2024, the company announced the sale of its Cumulus data center campus to Amazon Web Services for $650 million. As part of the transaction, Talen's Susquehanna plant will provide power to the campus under a power purchase agreement (PPA).

On July 10, 2024, Talen stock began trading on the NASDAQ Global Select Market under the symbol "TLN" after it ceased trading on the OTCQX Best Market at market close on July 9.

Talen's current leadership team includes CEO Mac McFarland, President Terry Nutt, CFO Cole Muller and General Counsel and Corporate Secretary Dan Kelly.

== Facilities and infrastructure ==
Talen's generation facilities include nuclear, coal, natural gas, and oil-fired power plants.

The largest plant is the Susquehanna Steam Electric Station, a 2.5 gigawatt nuclear power plant, located on the Susquehanna River seven miles (11 km) northeast of Berwick, Pennsylvania. Talen operates and owns a 90% interest in the Susquehanna facility, the sixth largest nuclear-powered generation facility in the U.S. Susquehanna's generation typically accounts for approximately half of Talen's total annual megawatts generated.

Talen's 9.9-GW natural gas and oil fleet includes technologically diverse natural gas and oil generation facilities across the generation stack (including intermediate and peaking dispatch). Certain units are capable of using multiple fuel sources, providing operational flexibility. These assets include significant generation in wholesale markets (primarily PJM), allowing them to generate predictable revenues on cleared capacity while also benefiting from varying market dynamics.

The following is a list of Talen's current generation facilities owned by subsidiaries of Talen:

=== Nuclear ===
- Susquehanna Steam Electric Station – Salem Township, PA

=== Coal ===
- Brandon Shores Generating Station – Pasadena, MD
- Brunner Island Steam Electric Station (also burns natural gas)- York Haven, PA
- Colstrip Power Plant – Colstrip, MT
- Conemaugh Generating Station – New Florence, PA
- Keystone Generating Station – Schelocta, PA

=== Natural Gas ===
- Darby Generating Station - Mount Sterling, OH
- Freedom Generating Station - Salem Township, PA
- Guernsey Power Station - Byesville, OH
- Lawrenceburg Power Plant - Lawrenceburg, IN
- Lower Mount Bethel Power Plant -Bangor, PA
- Martins Creek Power Plant – Bangor, PA
- Montour Power Plant – Washingtonville, PA
- Waterford Energy Center - Waterford, OH

=== Oil ===
Herbert A. Wagner Generating Station – Pasadena, MD
