= Portland Generating Station =

Power station in Northampton County, Pennsylvania

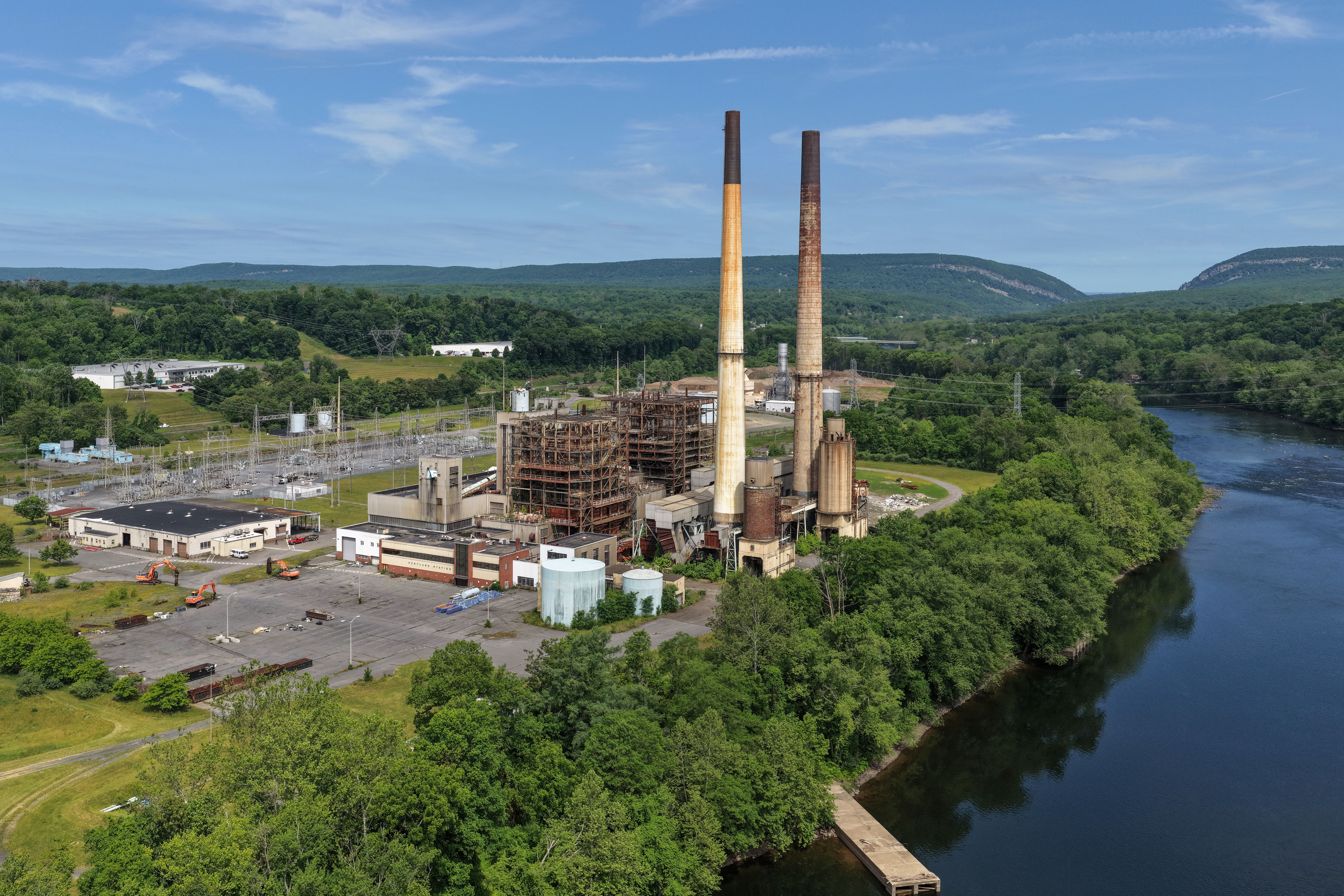
- The station in 2026
- Country: United States
- Location: Upper Mount Bethel Township, Northampton County, Pennsylvania, near Portland, Pennsylvania
- Coordinates: 40.910205°N 75.079398°W
- Status: Operational
- Commission date: 1958
- Owners: Portland Power, LLC

Thermal power station
- Primary fuel: No. 2 fuel oil
- Secondary fuel: Natural gas
- Turbine technology: Simple-cycle combustion turbine

Power generation
- Nameplate capacity: 194 MW

The Portland Generating Station is a natural gas and fuel oil peaking power station and former coal-fired power station in Upper Mount Bethel Township, Northampton County, Pennsylvania, near Portland, Pennsylvania. It is located along the Delaware River, about 1 mi (1.6 km) south of the borough.

Three simple-cycle combustion turbines remain in service, with a combined nameplate capacity of 194 megawatts. The station's two former coal-fired units had a combined net capacity of 401 MW.

== History ==
The first coal-fired unit entered service in 1958 and the second in 1962. Unit 1 was rated at 172 MW gross and 158 MW net, while Unit 2 was rated at 253 MW gross and 243 MW net.

In 2011, the United States Environmental Protection Agency granted a petition filed by New Jersey seeking limits on sulfur dioxide emissions from the plant. It was the first single-source petition granted by the agency.

A 2013 settlement with New Jersey and Connecticut required the owners to stop burning coal in Units 1 and 2 by June 1, 2014, except when needed to maintain the reliability of the electrical grid. Coal firing ended in 2014, while the combustion turbines remained in service.

Demolition of the former coal-handling facilities began in 2022.

== See also ==
- List of power stations in Pennsylvania
