= Panda Patriot Power Plant =

Power station in the United States

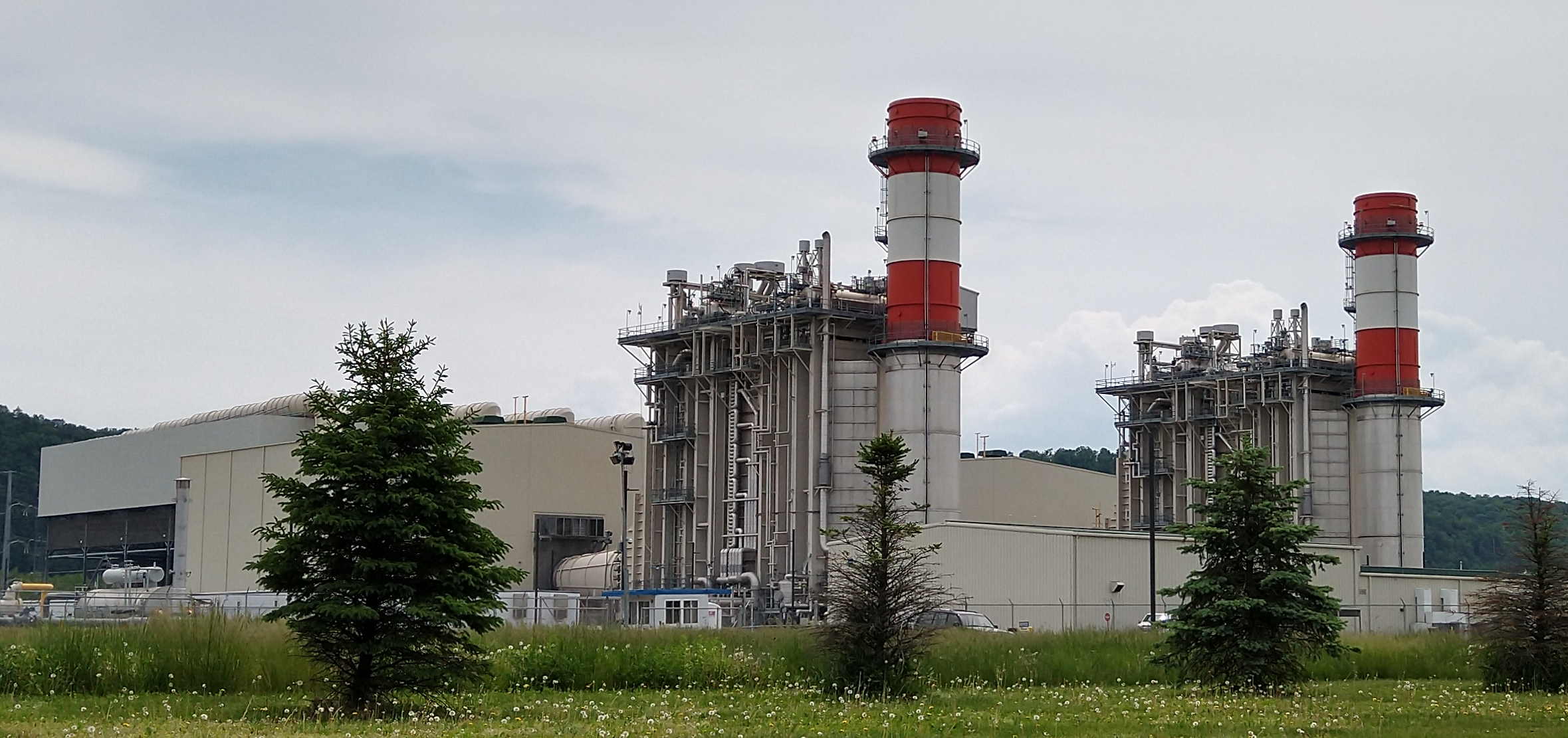
- Panda Patriot Power Plant in May 2021
- Location of Panda Patriot Power Plant
- Country: United States
- Location: Clinton Township, Pennsylvania
- Coordinates: 41.1807°N 76.8393°W
- Status: Operational
- Construction began: December 2013
- Commission date: 3Q 2016
- Construction cost: $ 909 million
- Owner: Panda Energy International
- Operator: Panda Energy International

Thermal power station
- Primary fuel: Natural gas

Power generation
- Units operational: 2 × 400 MW
- Nameplate capacity: 829 MW

The Panda Patriot Power Plant is a natural gas-fired power station that is located in Clinton Township, Lycoming County, Pennsylvania, United States (near Williamsport).

Owned solely by Panda Energy International of Dallas, Texas, the plant was built due to the retirement of roughly a dozen coal-fired power stations in Pennsylvania, New York and Maryland. After three years of planning and approval by local, state and federal agencies, construction on the station began in 2013. It took approximately thirty months to complete the total project.

== Current status ==
The plant has been operational since its commission date in 2016. It generates a total of 829 megawatts of electricity by the use of two 400 MW single-shaft power trains. The plant uses Siemens SGT6-8000H gas turbines, Siemens SST-5000 steam turbines, Siemens SGEN6-H hydrogen-cooled generators, Vogt “Smart-Box” Heat Recovery Steam Generators and Air Cooled Condensers. Gemma also constructed ancillary systems and buildings as well as the electrical interconnection facilities and tie-ins for natural gas, water and wastewater.

As of August 2017 the plant serves just over one million homes in Lycoming, Clinton, Potter, Northumberland, Union, Montour, Columbia, Sullivan, Tioga and Bradford counties in Pennsylvania. Along with Chemung, Broome and Steuben counties in New York.

== See also ==
- List of power stations in Pennsylvania
