= List of power stations in Pennsylvania =

Sources of Pennsylvania utility-scale electricity generation in gigawatt-hours, full year 2025:
1. Natural gas: 143,753 (58.0%)
2. Nuclear: 75,049 (30.3%)
3. Coal: 17,586 (7.10%)
4. Wind: 3,577 (1.44%)
5. Hydroelectric: 2,655 (1.07%)
6. Solar: 1,882 (0.76%)
7. Biomass: 1,449 (0.59%)
8. Other gases: 630 (0.25%)
9. Petroleum: 224 (0.09%)
10. Other: 837 (0.34%)

This is a list of electricity-generating power stations in the U.S. state of Pennsylvania, sorted by type and name. In 2024, Pennsylvania had a total summer capacity of 48.9 GW through all of its power plants, and a net generation of 241,498 GWh. In 2023, the electrical energy generation mix was 58% natural gas, 30.3% nuclear, 7.1% coal, 1.4% wind, 1.1% hydroelectric, 0.8% solar, 0.6% biomass, 0.3% other gases, 0.1% petroleum, and 0.3% other. Small-scale solar, which includes customer-owned photovoltaic panels, delivered an additional net 1,479 GWh of energy to the state's electrical grid in 2025. This was about 20 percent less than the 1,882 GWh of generation by Pennsylvania's utility-scale photovoltaic plants.

The generating mix in Pennsylvania has been shifting from coal to gas, as in other U.S. states. Extraction of the state's fossil-fuel resources for domestic and foreign export sale ranked among the highest in the nation during 2019.

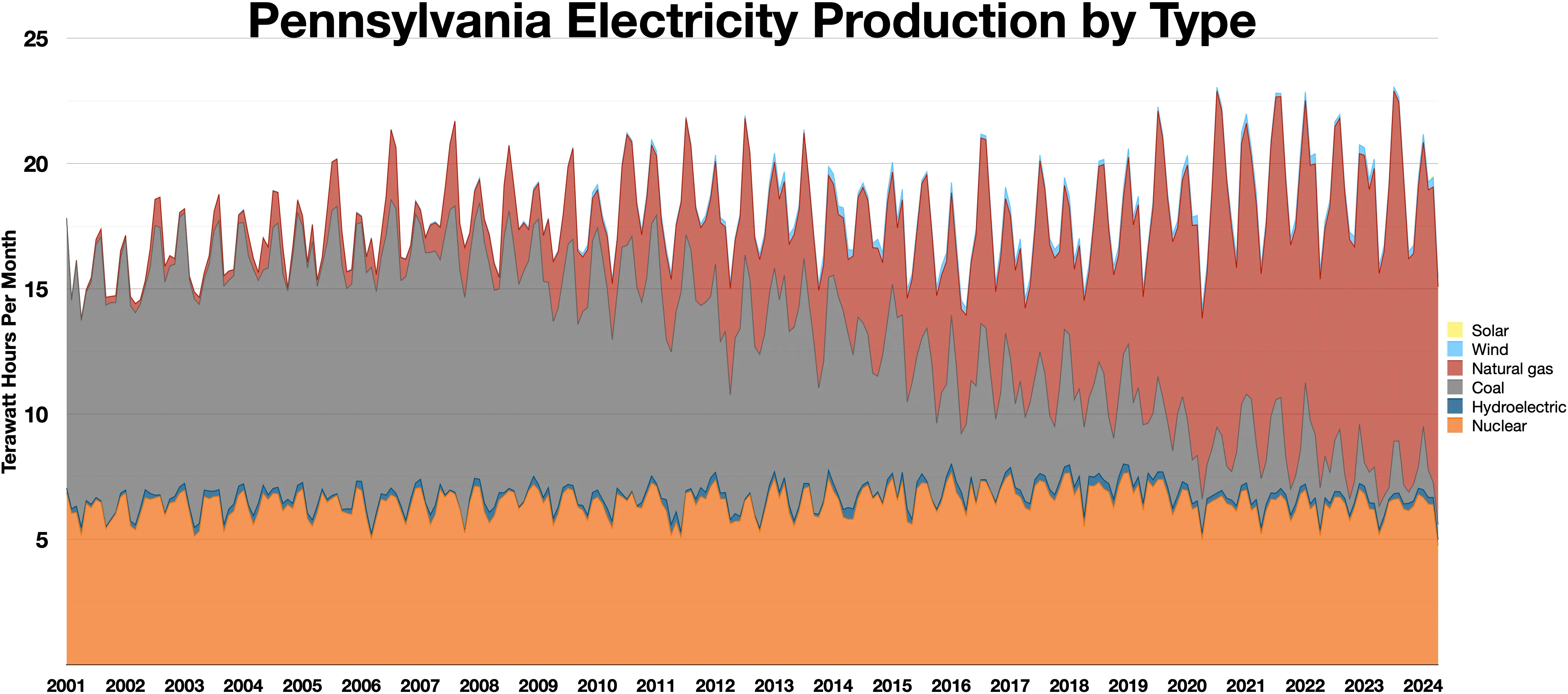
Pennsylvania electricity production by type

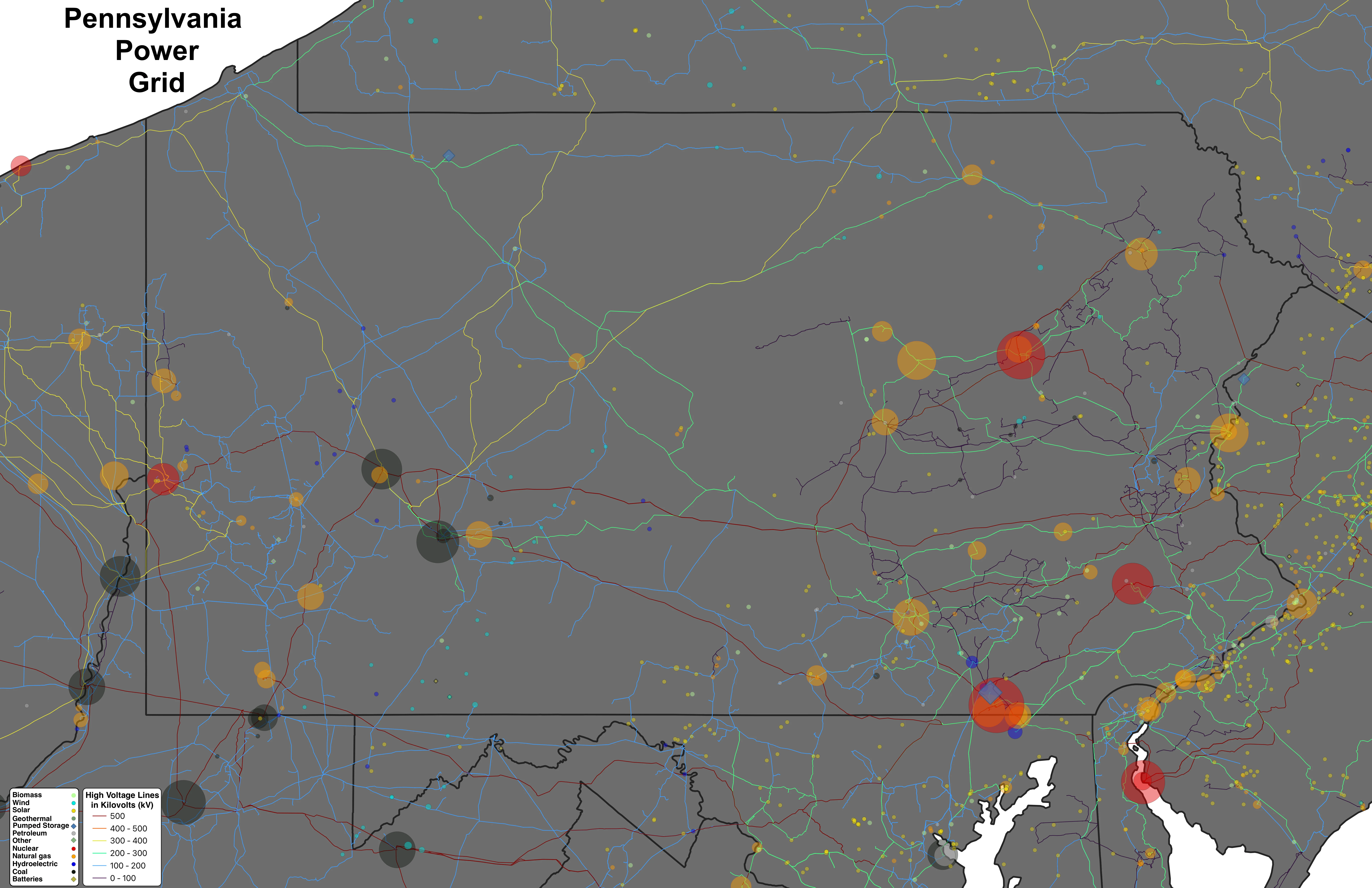
Pennsylvania power grid

== Nuclear power stations ==
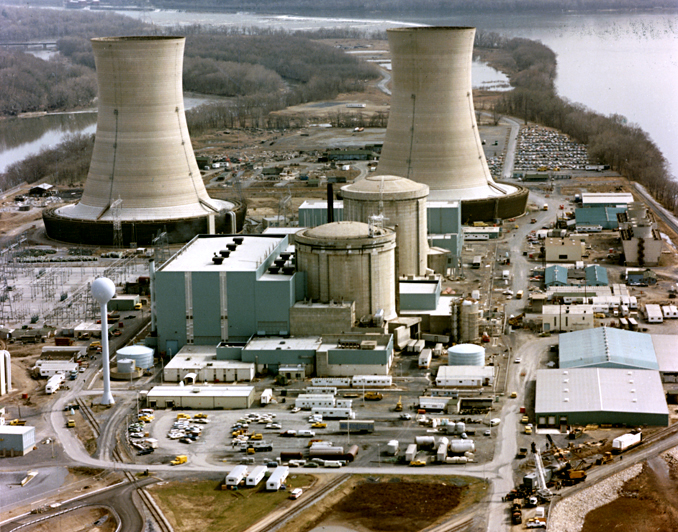
View of former Three Mile Island Nuclear Generating Station NPP along the Susquehanna River near Harrisburg, Pennsylvania

Name	Location (county)	Coordinates	Capacity (MW)	Year opened	Refs
Beaver Valley Nuclear Generating Station	Beaver	40°37′23″N 80°25′50″W	1,835	1976/1987	
Limerick Generating Station	Montgomery	40°13′35″N 75°35′14″W	2,296	1986/1990	
Peach Bottom Nuclear Generating Station	York	39°45′30″N 76°16′5″W	2,251	1974	
Susquehanna Steam Electric Station	Luzerne	41°05′19″N 76°08′56″W	2,520	1983/1985	

Source: U.S. Energy Information Administration (MW totals as of August 2014)

== Fossil-fuel power stations ==
Data from the U.S. Energy Information Administration serves as a general reference.

=== Coal ===
Name	Location (county)	Coordinates	Capacity (MW)	Year opened	Refs
Brunner Island Steam Electric Station	York	40°05′44″N 76°41′49″W	1,567	1969	
Colver Power Project	Cambria	40°33′00″N 78°48′00″W	118	1995	
Conemaugh Generating Station	Indiana	40°23′05″N 79°03′49″W	1,872	1970/1971	
Ebensburg Power	Cambria	40°27′18″N 78°44′50″W	50	1990	
Foster Wheeler Mt Carmel Cogen	Northumberland	40°48′40″N 76°27′11″W	43	1990	
John B Rich Power Station	Schuylkill	40°47′25″N 76°11′54″W	80	1988	
Keystone Generating Station	Armstrong	40°39′36″N 79°20′27″W	1,872	1967/1968	
Northampton Generating Company	Northampton	40°41′30″N 75°28′45″W	134	1995	
Panther Creek	Carbon	40°51′20″N 75°52′41″W	83	1992	
Scrubgrass Generating Plant	Venango	41°16′09″N 79°48′48″W	85	1993	
Seward	Indiana	40°24′22″N 79°02′01″W	585	2004	
Spring Grove Facility	York	39°52′15″N 76°52′05″W	36	1989	
St Nicholas Cogen Plant	Schuylkill	40°49′20″N 76°10′25″W	86	1990	
Westwood Generation	Schuylkill	40°37′09″N 76°27′00″W	30	1987	
Wheelabrator Frackville	Schuylkill	40°48′06″N 76°10′30″W	48	1988	

=== Natural gas ===
Name	Location (county)	Coordinates	Capacity (MW)	Generation type	Year opened	Refs
Allegheny Energy	Allegheny	40°32′43″N 79°46′07″W	556	2x1 combined cycle	2003	
Armstrong	Armstrong	40°38′17″N 79°21′06″W	688	Simple cycle (x4)	2002	
Bethlehem Power Plant	Northampton	40°37′03″N 75°18′53″W	1,153	3x1 combined cycle (x2)	2002/2003	
Birdsboro	Berks	40°16′07″N 75°47′59″W	525	Combined cycle	2019	
Brunner Island	York	40°05′46″N 76°41′46″W	768.3	Steam turbine (x2)	1961/1965	
Brunot Island	Allegheny	40°27′54″N 80°02′38″W	339.9	3x1 combined cycle	1973/1974	
Bucknell University	Union	40°57′18″N 76°52′44″W	5.9	1x1 combined cycle	1991/1998	
Chambersburg	Franklin	39°52′01″N 77°41′09″W	87.6	Simple cycle (x2)	2001	
Clairton Works^{[A]}	Allegheny	40°18′35″N 79°52′55″W	31	Steam turbine (x2)	1955	
CPV Fairview Energy Center	Cambria	40°24′43″N 78°51′18″W	1,197	2x1 combined cycle	2019	
Eddystone Generating Station	Delaware	39°51′29″N 75°19′23″W	782	Steam turbine (x2)	1974/1976	
Fairless Energy Center	Bucks	40°08′51″N 74°44′28″W	1,338	2x1 combined cycle (x2)	2004	
Fayette Energy Center	Fayette	39°51′33″N 79°55′06″W	644.1	2x1 combined cycle	2003	
Gans	Fayette	39°44′51″N 79°50′20″W	87.6	Simple cycle (x2)	2000	
Grays Ferry Cogeneration	Philadelphia	39°56′32″N 75°11′17″W	192.6	Steam turbine, simple cycle	1997 (57.6MW); 1997 (135MW)	
Handsome Lake Energy	Venango	41°17′27″N 79°48′22″W	294.5	Simple cycle (x5)	2001	
Hazleton	Luzerne	40°55′42″N 76°02′27″W	171.5	Simple cycle (x4)	1989/2002	
Hickory Run Energy Station	Lawrence	40°59′41″N 80°25′49″W	950	2x1 combined cycle	2020	
Hunlock Power Station	Luzerne	41°12′02″N 76°04′12″W	189.9	2x1 combined cycle, simple cycle	1959/2011 (145.9MW); 2000 (44MW)	
Hunterstown Power Plant	Adams	39°52′21″N 77°10′02″W	898	3x1 combined cycle	2003	
Ironwood	Lebanon	40°21′03″N 76°21′57″W	777.6	2x1 combined cycle	2001	
Lackawanna Energy Center	Lackawanna	41°28′17″N 75°32′39″W	1,665	Combined cycle (x3)	2018	
Liberty Electric Power Plant	Delaware	39°51′41″N 75°20′09″W	614	2x1 combined cycle	2002	
Lower Mount Bethel Energy	Northampton	40°48′07″N 75°06′27″W	651.6	2x1 combined cycle	2004	
Marcus Hook Energy	Delaware	39°48′37″N 75°25′41″W	836.1	3x1 combined cycle	2004	
Mon Valley Works^{[A]}	Allegheny	40°23′33″N 79°51′23″W	52.5	Steam turbine (x3)	1943/2002	
Freedom Generating Station	Luzerne	41°06′47″N 76°09′29″W	1,045	Combined cycle (x2)	2018	
New Castle	Lawrence	40°56′16″N 80°22′08″W	348	Steam turbine (x3)	1952/1958/1964	
Ontelaunee Energy Center	Berks	40°25′19″N 75°56′08″W	728	2x1 combined cycle	2002	
Panda Hummel Station	Snyder	40°50′20″N 76°49′32″W	1,194.4	3x1 combined cycle	2018	
Panda Liberty Generation (Hamilton Liberty)	Bradford	41°46′03″N 76°23′24″W	870	Combined cycle (x2)	2016	
Panda Patriot Generation (Hamilton Patriot)	Lycoming	41°10′51″N 76°50′21″W	870	Combined cycle (x2)	2016	
Procter&Gamble Mehoopany Mill	Wyoming	41°34′27″N 76°02′36″W	117.6	Simple cycle (x2)	1985/2013	
Shawville	Clearfield	41°04′03″N 78°21′58″W	526	Steam turbine (x4)	1954/1959/1960	
Spring Grove Facility	York	39°52′15″N 76°52′05″W	18.6	Steam turbine (x3)	2019	
Springdale	Allegheny	40°32′48″N 79°46′06″W	87.6	Simple cycle (x2)	1999	
TalenEnergy Martins Creek	Northampton	40°47′52″N 75°06′19″W	1,794.4	Simple cycle (x4), steam turbine (x2)	1971 (94.4MW); 1975/1977 (1700MW)	
TalenEnergy Montour	Montour	41°04′17″N 76°40′02″W	1,508		1972/1973	
Tenaska Westmoreland	Westmoreland	40°10′31″N 79°41′48″W	940	2x1 combined cycle	2018	
West Campus Steam Plant	Centre	40°47′34″N 77°51′53″W	5.1	Steam turbine (x2)	2017	
York Energy Center	York	39°44′15″N 76°18′24″W	1,449.4	3x1 combined cycle, 2x1 combined cycle	2011 (560MW); 2019 (889.4MW)	
York Generation Company	York	39°59′08″N 76°40′34″W	52.2	2x1 combined cycle (x2)	1989	

^{A} The Clairton, Erie, and Mon Valley facilities burn other hydrocarbon gases released during processing of coal to produce coke.

=== Petroleum ===
Name	Location (county)	Coordinates	Capacity (MW)	Generation type	Year opened	Refs
Croydon CT Generating Station	Bucks	40°04′48″N 74°53′30″W	546.4	Simple cycle (x8)	1974	
Portland Generating Station	Northampton	40°54′37″N 75°04′46″W	194	Simple cycle (x3)	1967/1971/1997	

== Renewable power stations ==
Data from the U.S. Energy Information Administration serves as a general reference.

=== Biomass and municipal waste ===
Name	Location (county)	Coordinates	Capacity (MW)	Primary fuel	Generation type	Year opened	Refs
Archbald Power Station	Lackawanna	41°29′06″N 75°32′26″W	32.4	Landfill gas	Steam turbine, simple cycle (x2)	1988 (23.2MW); 2010 (9.2MW)	
Broad Mountain	Schuykill	40°40′11″N 76°22′51″W	11	Landfill gas	Simple cycle (x2)	2009	
Covanta Delaware Valley	Delaware	39°49′35″N 75°23′18″W	90	Municipal solid waste (biogenic & non-biogenic)	Steam turbine	1991	
Covanta Plymouth	Montgomery	40°05′48″N 75°18′37″W	32.1	Municipal solid waste (biogenic & non-biogenic)	Steam turbine	1991	
Fairless Hills	Bucks	40°08′26″N 74°45′02″W	60	Landfill gas	Steam turbine (x2)	1996	
Gettysburg Facility	Adams	39°57′01″N 77°07′31″W	3.3	Other biomass solids	Steam turbine	2013	
Glades Pike Generation Plant	Somerset	40°00′24″N 79°02′28″W	6.5	Landfill gas	Reciprocating engine (x2), simple cycle	2011 (3.2MW); 2011 (3.3MW)	
Green Knight EC	Northampton	40°51′33″N 75°15′46″W	9.9	Landfill gas	Simple cycle (x3)	2001	
Harrisburg Facility	Dauphin	40°14′39″N 76°51′14″W	24.1	Municipal solid waste (biogenic & non-biogenic)	Steam turbine	2006	
Johnsonburg Mill	Elk	41°29′29″N 78°40′33″W	54	Wood/wood waste	Steam turbine	1993	
Keystone Recovery	Lackawanna	41°26′11″N 75°35′54″W	5.6	Landfill gas	Reciprocating engine (x7)	1995/1996	
Lancaster County	Lancaster County	40°04′16″N 76°38′37″W	35.7	Municipal solid waste (biogenic & non-biogenic)	Steam turbine	1990	
Mountain View	Franklin	39°48′05″N 77°47′18″W	14.4	Landfill gas	Reciprocating engine (x48)	2003	
Pennsbury	Bucks	40°09′11″N 74°46′09″W	6.0	Landfill gas	Simple cycle (x2)	1996	
Pine Grove	Schuylkill	40°33′19″N 76°23′19″W	5.4	Landfill gas	Reciprocating engine (x18)	2008	
Pioneer Crossing Energy	Berks	40°16′30″N 75°49′00″W	8.0	Landfill gas	Reciprocating engine (x5)	2008/2013	
PWD Cogen Plant	Philadelphia	39°59′19″N 75°05′00″W	5.6	Other biomass gas	Reciprocating engine (x4)	2013	
Spring Grove Facility	York	39°52′15″N 76°52′05″W	39.1	Wood/wood waste	Steam turbine	1994	
Waste Management Arden	Washington	40°12′21″N 80°15′40″W	4.8	Landfill gas	Reciprocating engine (x6)	2009	
Wheelabrator Falls	Bucks	40°09′45″N 74°46′06″W	53.3	Municipal solid waste (biogenic & non-biogenic)	Steam turbine	1994	
York County	York	40°00′06″N 76°43′06″W	36.5	Municipal solid waste (biogenic & non-biogenic)	Steam turbine	1989	

=== Hydroelectric ===
Name	Location (county)	Coordinates	Capacity (MW)	Number of turbines	Year opened	Refs
Allegheny Hydro Partners No. 5	Armstrong	40°40′58″N 79°39′55″W	6.0	2	1988	
Allegheny Hydro Partners No. 6	Armstrong	40°42′59″N 79°34′38″W	8.0	2	1988	
Allegheny Hydro Partners No. 8	Armstrong	40°53′48″N 79°28′44″W	13.6	2	1990	
Allegheny Hydro Partners No. 9	Armstrong	40°57′22″N 79°33′03″W	17.8	2	1990	
Beaver Valley- Patterson	Beaver	40°37′19″N 80°26′01″W	1.2	3	1982	
Conemaugh Dam	Indiana & Westmoreland	40°27′52″N 79°21′57″W	14.0	2	1989	
Holtwood Dam	Lancaster & York	39°49′37″N 76°20′07″W	109	14	1910-1914/1924/ 2011-2013	
Lake Lynn Hydro	Fayette	39°43′13″N 79°51′22″W	51.2	4	1926/1929	
Mahoning Creek	Armstrong	40°55′16″N 79°16′54″W	6.6	1	2013	
Piney Hydroelectric	Clarion	41°11′32″N 79°26′01″W	27.0	3	1924/1928	
Safe Harbor Dam	Lancaster & York	39°55′14″N 76°23′33″W	422.5	14	1931-1934/1940/ 1985-1986	
Townsend Hydro	Beaver	40°44′01″N 80°18′53″W	4.2	2	1987	
Wallenpaupack	Pike & Wayne	41°28′04″N 75°07′51″W	44.0	2	1926	
Warrior Ridge Hydro	Huntingdon	40°32′24″N 78°02′05″W	2.8	4	1985	
William F. Matson	Huntingdon	40°26′01″N 78°00′24″W	21.0	2	1988	
York Haven Dam	Dauphin, Lancaster & York	40°07′03″N 76°42′55″W	20.0	20	1904-1910	
Yough Hydro Power	Fayette & Somerset	39°48′06″N 79°22′06″W	12.2	2	1989	

=== Solar ===
Name	Location (county)	Coordinates	Capacity (MW_{AC})	Year opened	Refs
CPV Maple Hill Solar	Cambria	40.3489°N 78.6460°W	100	2023	
Great Cove I and II	Franklin, Fulton		220	2024	
Keystone Solar	Lancaster	39.8611°N 76.2211°W	5.0	2012	
PA Solar Park	Carbon	40.8601°N 75.8522°W	10.1	2012	
White Tail Solar	Franklin	40.1414°N 77.6097°W	13.5	2019	

=== Wind ===
Name	Location (county)	Coordinates	Capacity (MW)	Number of turbines	Year Opened	Refs
Allegheny Ridge Wind Farm	Cambria	40°23′02″N 78°34′46″W	80.0	40	2007	
Armenia Mountain Wind Farm	Bradford & Tioga	41°45′43″N 76°51′19″W	100.5	67	2009	
Bear Creek Wind Power Project	Luzerne	41°14′07″N 75°45′11″W	24.0	12	2006	
Big Level Wind	Potter	41°52′09″N 77°39′57″W	90.0	25	2019	
Casselman Wind Power Project	Somerset	39°51′00″N 79°08′17″W	34.5	23	2007	
Chestnut Flats Wind	Blair	40°31′22″N 78°28′37″W	38.0	19	2011	
Forward Wind	Somerset	40°05′07″N 78°51′48″W	29.4	14	2008	
Highland Wind (I&II)	Cambria	40°18′15″N 78°41′27″W	137.5	55	2009/2012	
Laurel Hill Wind	Lycoming	41°31′56″N 77°01′47″W	69.0	30	2012	
Locust Ridge Wind Farm (I&II)	Schuylkill	40°51′18″N 76°07′45″W	128.0	64	2007/2009	
Lookout Wind	Somerset	39°52′46″N 78°55′06″W	37.8	18	2008	
Mehoopany Wind Energy	Wyoming	41°25′14″N 76°02′57″W	140.8	88	2012	
Meyersdale Wind Farm	Somerset	39°47′27″N 79°00′07″W	30.0	20	2003	
Mill Run Wind Energy Center	Somerset	39°54′48″N 79°23′37″W	15.0	10	2001	
North Allegheny Wind	Blair	40°26′17″N 78°32′37″W	70.0	35	2009	
Patton Wind	Cambria	40°37′51″N 78°41′46″W	30.0	15	2012	
PPL Frey Farm Landfill Wind	Lancaster	39°57′33″N 76°27′20″W	3.2	2	2011	
Ringer Hill Wind	Somerset	39°44′41″N 79°11′17″W	39.9	14	2016	
Sandy Ridge Wind Farm	Blair & Centre	40°43′45″N 78°17′15″W	48.2	35	2012	
Somerset Wind Farm	Somerset	39°58′45″N 79°00′46″W	9.0	6	2001	
South Chestnut Wind Project	Fayette	39°45′05″N 79°43′38″W	50.4	23	2012	
Stoney Creek Wind	Somerset	40°01′52″N 78°48′55″W	52.5	35	2009	
Twin Ridges Wind	Somerset	39°45′38″N 78°52′29″W	139.4	68	2012	
Waymart Wind Farm	Wayne	41°33′12″N 75°27′15″W	64.5	43	2003	

== Storage power stations ==
Data from the U.S. Energy Information Administration serves as a general reference.

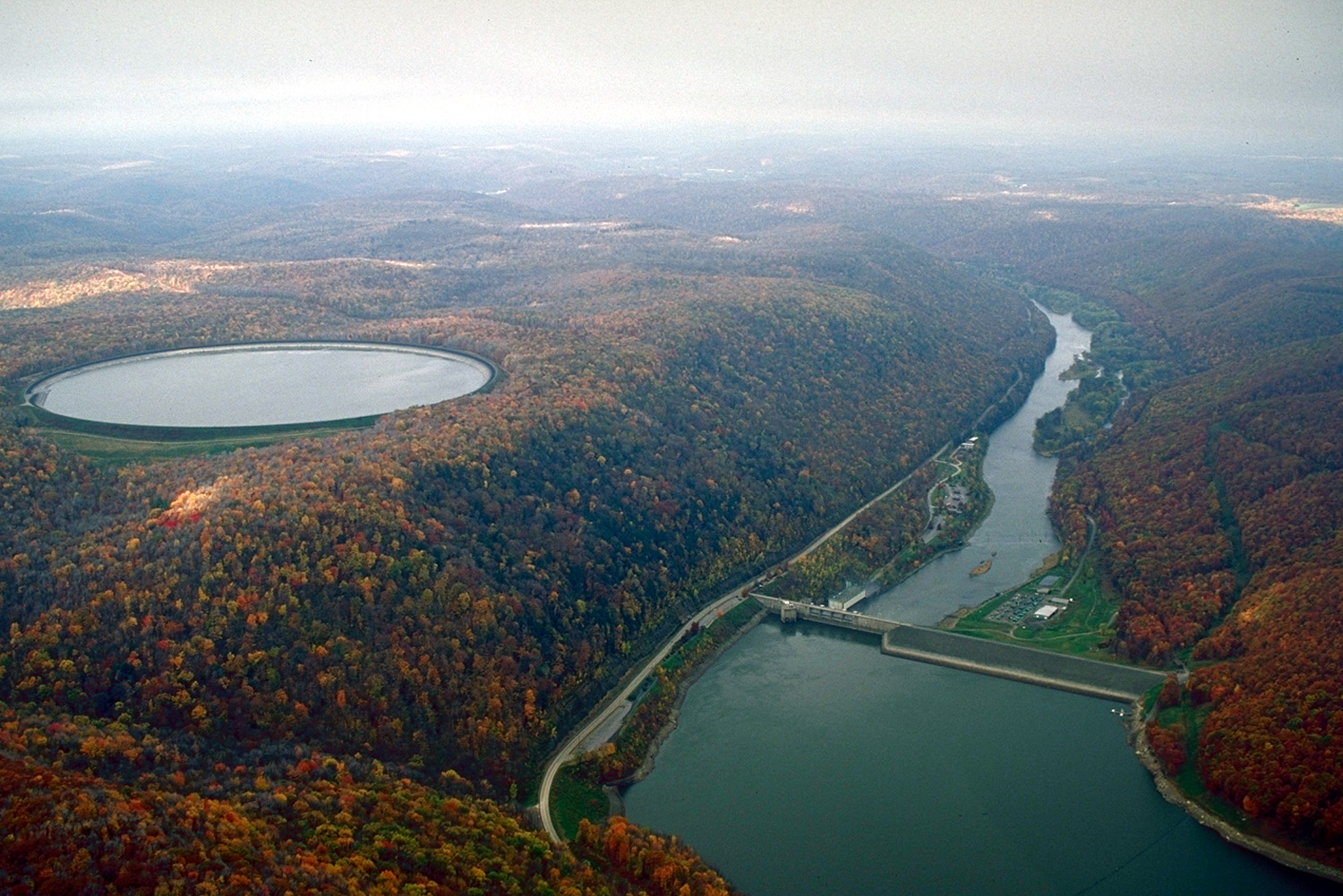
The Seneca Pumped Storage Generating Station reservoir. Kinzua Dam on the Allegheny River is on the right.

=== Battery ===
Name	Location (county)	Coordinates	Capacity (MW)	Year opened	Refs
Green Mountain Storage	Somerset	39°51′05″N 79°04′14″W	10.4	2016	
Meyersdale Battery	Somerset	39°47′27″N 79°00′08″W	18.0	2015	

=== Flywheel ===
Name	Location (county)	Coordinates	Capacity (MW)	Number of flywheels	Year opened	Refs
Hazle Spindle	Luzerne	40°56′50″N 76°03′12″W	20.0	200	2014	

=== Pumped storage ===
Name	Location (county)	Coordinates	Capacity (MW)	Number of turbines	Year opened	Refs
Muddy Run Pumped Storage Facility	Lancaster	39°48′29″N 76°17′53″W	1,071	8	1967/1968	
Seneca Pumped Storage Generating Station	Warren	41°50′21″N 79°00′13″W	435	2	1970	

== Former power stations ==
Name	Type	Location (county)	Coordinates	Capacity (MW)	Decommissioned
Armstrong Power Plant	Natural gas/diesel	Armstrong	40°55′45″N 79°27′59″W	600	2012
Bruce Mansfield Power Plant	Coal	Beaver	40°38′06″N 80°24′55″W	2,490	2019
Chester Waterside Station	Coal, natural gas	Delaware	39°49′45″N 75°23′2″W	1,242	1981
Cromby Generating Station	Coal	Chester	40°9′11″N 75°31′44″W	118	2011
Cheswick Generating Station	Coal	Allegheny	40°32′18″N 79°47′29″W	635	2022
Delaware Station	Coal, oil	Philadelphia	39°58′00″N 75°07′37″W	468	2008
Delta Water Power Co.	Hydro, water	York		0.275	1936?
Frank R. Phillips Power Station	Coal	Beaver	40°34′8″N 80°13′43″W		1990s
George F. Weaton Power Station	Coal	Beaver	40°40′2″N 80°20′46″W	110	2012
Hatfield's Ferry Power Station	Coal	Greene	39°51′20″N 79°55′39″W	1,700	2013
Homer City Generating Station	Coal	Indiana	40°30′39″N 79°11′37″W	2,022	July 1, 2023
Mitchell Power Station	Coal, oil	Washington	40°13′16″N 79°58′6″W	370	2014
Sunbury Generation Plant	Coal	Snyder		400	2014
Three Mile Island Nuclear Generating Station	Nuclear	Dauphin	40°09′14″N 76°43′29″W	805	2019
Titus Generating Station	Coal	Berks	40.305475.908581		

== See also ==
- List of power stations in the United States
