= Brandon Shores Generating Station =

Electric generating station in Anne Arundel County, Maryland, US

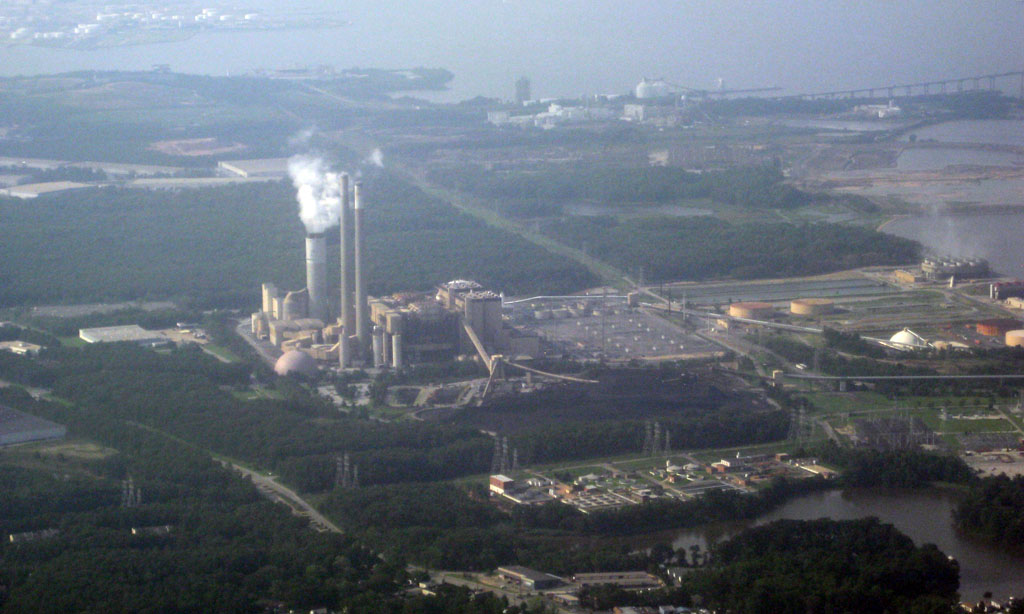
- Brandon Shores Generating Station viewed from the south
- Country: United States
- Location: Anne Arundel County, Maryland
- Coordinates: 39°10′53″N 76°32′16″W
- Status: Operational
- Commission date: Unit 1: May, 1984; Unit 2: May, 1991
- Owner: Talen Energy

Thermal power station
- Primary fuel: Bituminous coal
- Cooling source: Chesapeake Bay

Power generation
- Units operational: 2
- Nameplate capacity: 1370 MW_{e}

External links
- Website: Brandon Shores Plant
- Commons: Related media on Commons

The Brandon Shores Generating Station is an electric generating station located in Anne Arundel County, Maryland, near Glen Burnie, and is operated by Talen Energy. Brandon Shores consists of a pair of Babcock & Wilcox coal-fired boilers which each feed a General Electric steam turbine. The station has a combined nominal generating capacity of 1370 MWe. Unit 1 went into operation in May 1984 and Unit 2 in May 1991.

The station shares a 483-acre (195 ha) site adjacent to the Patapsco River with the Herbert A. Wagner Generating Station. The Brandon Shores plant dominates the site with its 700-foot (210 m) exhaust and 400-foot (120 m) flue-gas desulfurization system stacks. In April 2023, Talen Energy notified its grid operator, PJM, that it intended to close the station on June 1, 2025. While the plant was scheduled to retire on June 1, 2025, Units 1 and 2 will continue to operate beyond this date until May 31, 2029 under a “reliability-must-run” (RMR) agreement to provide power necessary to maintain grid and transmission reliability in and around the City of Baltimore until transmission upgrades to provide reliable power to the area from other sources are complete.

== Coal delivery ==
Coal for Brandon Shores is delivered by barge. Although there is a railroad spur into the site, it is unused and would require improvements to restore it to an operational state.

== Environmental violations ==
Prior to Talen's ownership and operation of the plant, Constellation Energy disposed fly ash from Brandon Shores at a former sand and gravel mine in Gambrills, Maryland from 1996 to 2007. The ash contaminated groundwater with heavy metals. The Maryland Department of the Environment issued a fine of $1 million to Constellation. Nearby residents filed a lawsuit against Constellation and in 2008 the company settled the case for $54 million.

== Renovation ==
In order to meet Maryland requirements for reductions of nitrogen oxides, sulfur dioxide and mercury, the plant was substantially renovated between 2007 and 2010. A new 400 feet (120 m) twin flue-gas desulfurization stack was built to replace the existing 700 feet (210 m) stacks, which have been capped and are inoperative. Flue gas from the boilers is routed through the emissions control system that sprays the exhaust with a limestone slurry and collects gypsum for use in wallboard and fly ash for use in concrete. The system uses treated municipal wastewater from the Anne Arundel County Cox Creek wastewater treatment plant as the source of water for making the limestone slurry.

== 2012 sale ==
The plant was originally constructed by a predecessor company of Constellation Energy, which was purchased by Exelon in 2012. On August 9, 2012, Exelon announced that it had reached an agreement for the sale of the Charles P. Crane, Brandon Shores, and Herbert A. Wagner Generating Stations to Raven Power Holdings LLC, a newly formed portfolio company of Riverstone Holdings LLC, for approximately $400 million. Exelon had committed to divest the plants as condition for regulatory approval of its merger with Constellation Energy to alleviate concerns regarding potential market power in the regional wholesale electricity market. The sale was completed on November 30, 2012. When Riverstone Holdings executed a take-private transaction and became the majority owner of Talen in 2016, Brandon Shores, along with other Riverstone-owned generation assets, became part of the Talen portfolio. Following a strategic restructuring of Talen in 2023, it became a publicly traded company and was no longer privately owned by Riverstone.

== Scheduled closure ==
On November 10, 2020, Talen Energy (parent company of Raven Power) announced that it will stop burning coal at the Brandon Shores and H.A. Wagner plants by the end of 2025. The plants will be converted to use alternative fuel sources.

In April 2023, Talen notified grid operator PJM that they instead intended to close Brandon Shores. However, the PJM Interconnection found that the shutdown would pose significant grid reliability risks. On January 27, 2025, Talen announced that it, PJM Interconnection, and a broad coalition of the Maryland Public Service Commission, Maryland customers, and electric utilities, agreed on the terms by which Talen will operate its Brandon Shores and H.A. Wagner power plants until May 31, 2029, beyond their scheduled May 31, 2025 retirement dates. The agreement, colloquially called a "reliability-must-run" or agreement, is intended to provide the power necessary to maintain grid and transmission reliability in and around the City of Baltimore until necessary transmission upgrades to provide reliable power to the area from other sources are complete and is pending FERC approval.

== Dispatch of electricity ==
The electrical output of Brandon Shores Generating Station is dispatched by the PJM Interconnection regional transmission organization.

== See also ==
- List of power stations in Maryland
