= Armstrong Power Plant =

Former power plant in Washington, Armstrong, Pennsylvania, United States

- Country: United States
- Location: Washington Township, Armstrong County, Pennsylvania
- Coordinates: 40°55′45″N 79°27′59″W
- Status: Decommissioned
- Commission date: 1958; 1959
- Decommission date: 2012
- Owner: FirstEnergy

Thermal power station
- Primary fuel: Coal
- Cooling source: Allegheny River

Power generation
- Units operational: 2
- Nameplate capacity: 356 MW

Armstrong Power Station was a 356 megawatt (MW), coal power plant in Washington Township, Armstrong County along the Allegheny River across from Mahoning Creek and Templeton, Pennsylvania, about 10 miles (16 km) north of Kittanning, Pennsylvania. The plant operated from 1958 to 2012.

== History ==
Armstrong's two units went in service in 1958 and 1959. The chimney of Armstrong Power Station, which was built in 1982 is 1,011 feet (308 m) tall and cost $13 million. The facility was owned by Allegheny Energy Supply before merging with Akron, Ohio based FirstEnergy in February 2011.

The power plant was closed on September 1, 2012, by FirstEnergy, along with six other plants in the tri-county grid to comply with federal Environmental Protection Agency (EPA) guidelines that set new Mercury and Air Toxics Standards (MATS) and other environmental and air quality requirements. The decision was made not to invest in some of the smaller plants considering it would be quite expensive to install a scrubber and other air pollution control upgrades to keep the plant in operation.

== See also ==
- List of power stations in Pennsylvania
