= Keystone Lake (Armstrong County, Pennsylvania) =

- Location within Pennsylvania Location within the United States
- Location: Armstrong County, Pennsylvania, U.S. state
- Coordinates: 40°45′02″N 79°17′09″W
- Type: reservoir
- Basin countries: United States
- Surface area: 120 acres (49 ha)
- Surface elevation: 1,076 feet (328 m)

Keystone Lake (also known as Keystone Reservoir and Plum Creek Reservoir) is a reservoir in Armstrong County in the U.S. state of Pennsylvania. The elevation of Keystone Lake is 1,076 feet (328 m) above sea level.

== See also ==
- List of lakes in Pennsylvania
- List of dams and reservoirs in United States
- List of rivers of Pennsylvania
- List of tributaries of the Allegheny River
