= Pleasant Prairie Power Plant =

Power plant in Wisconsin

- Country: United States
- Location: Pleasant Prairie, Wisconsin
- Coordinates: 42°32′17″N 87°54′17″W
- Status: Decommissioned
- Commission date: Unit 1: 1980; Unit 2: 1985
- Decommission date: Units 1–2: April, 2018
- Owner: We Energies

Thermal power station
- Primary fuel: Coal
- Turbine technology: Steam turbine
- Cooling source: 2 × Mechanical Draft

Power generation
- Units operational: 2 × 605 MW
- Nameplate capacity: 1,210 MW

Pleasant Prairie Power Plant was a 1.21-gigawatt (1,210 MW) coal power plant located in Pleasant Prairie, Wisconsin. In 2009, it was listed by the U.S. Energy Information Administration (EIA) as the largest generating station in Wisconsin and generated roughly 13% of Wisconsin's electricity, burning around 13,000 tons of coal daily.

== Background ==
The 30-year-old power plant has developed and applied a retrofit system that has helped reduce nitrogen oxide (NO_{x}) by up to 90% and sulfur dioxide (SO_{2}) by up to 95%. The Pleasant Prairie plant produces “8.6 million tons of CO_{2} annually – about as much as (that produced by) 1.7 million US cars”, according to The Wall Street Journal. The plant uses experimental technology designed by French Alstom SA to separate carbon dioxide from the exhaust, and is seen as a proving ground for clean coal technology. The plant is owned by We Energies. In an effort to reduce carbon dioxide (CO_{2}) emissions, the plant uses a chilled ammonia (NH_{3}) process developed by Alstom. that captures up to 90% of carbon emissions as it escapes the flue gas. The demonstration project began in March 2008 and would last for two years. The America’s Power Factuality Tour stopped at the Pleasant Prairie Power Plant to report on its role in generating electricity in the United States in 2009.

Pleasant Prairie received its coal from the Powder River Basin in Wyoming. Most of it is sourced from the Cordero Rojo Mine.

On November 28, 2017, WEC Energy Group announced that it would be closing the plant in 2018, pending permission from Midcontinent Independent System Operator (MISO). WEC cited market forces such as cheaper natural gas and renewables for the plant's closure. Pleasant Prairie shut down on April 3, 2018. The plant is expected to cost $1 billion over the next 2 decades while saving $2.5 billion in avoided costs.

== See also ==
- List of power stations in Wisconsin
- Coal pollution mitigation
