= Herbert A. Wagner Generating Station =

Electric generating station in Maryland

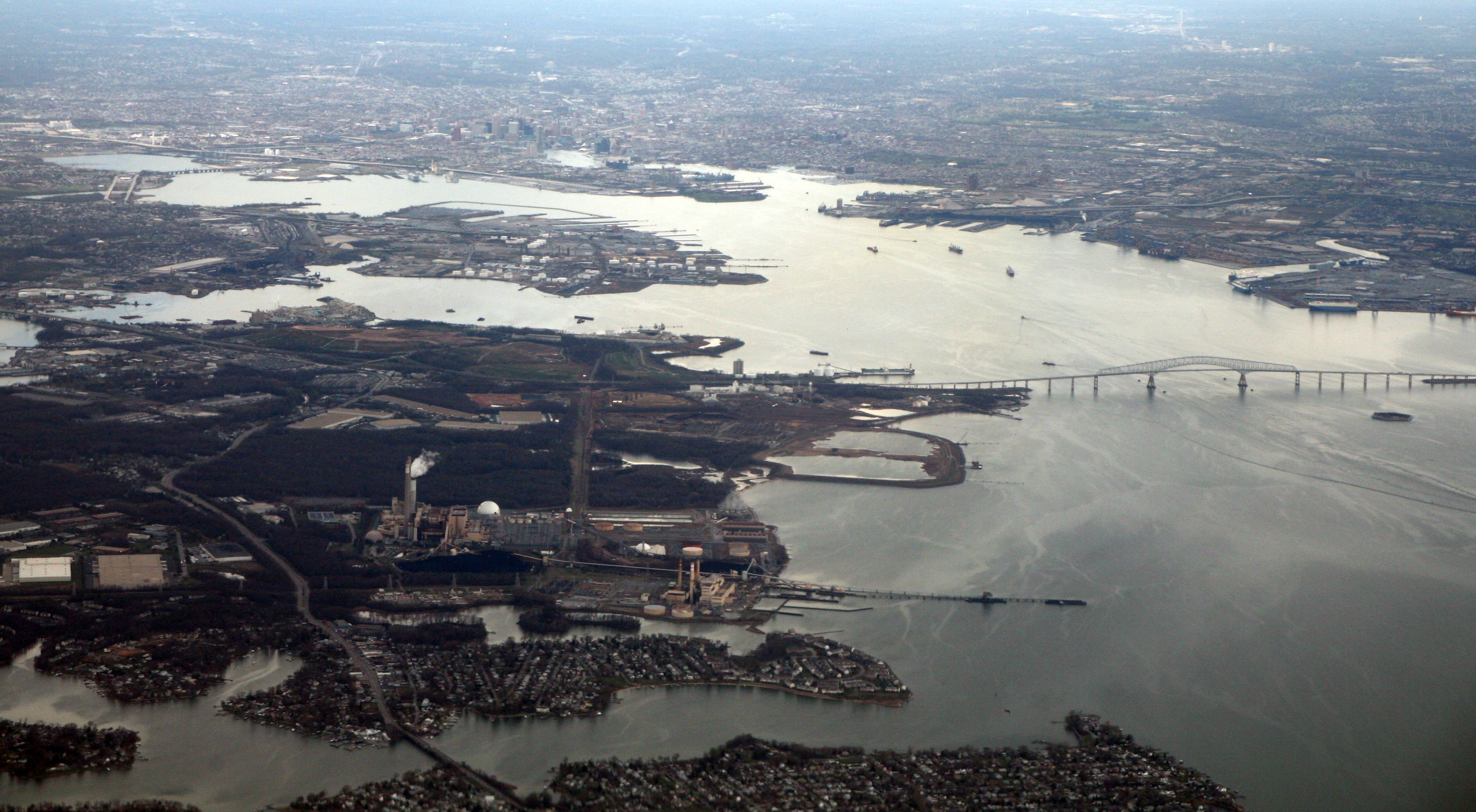
- H.A. Wagner (center, on the water) and Brandon Shores Generating Stations, with Francis Scott Key Bridge
- Country: United States
- Location: Anne Arundel County, Maryland
- Coordinates: 39°10′43″N 76°31′37″W
- Status: Operational
- Commission date: Unit 1: February, 1956; Unit 2: January, 1959; Unit 3: August, 1966; Unit 4: August, 1972; Units 3 and 4 continue to operate
- Owner: Talen Energy June 2015 - Present

Thermal power station
- Primary fuel: Residual fuel oil
- Turbine technology: Steam turbine
- Cooling source: Chesapeake Bay

Power generation
- Units operational: 2
- Nameplate capacity: 702 MW

External links
- Website: Talen Energy
- Commons: Related media on Commons

The Herbert A. Wagner Generating Station is an electric generating station located in Anne Arundel County, Maryland, just east of Glen Burnie, and is operated by the Raven Power Holdings, LLC, a subsidiary of Talen Energy.

Talen Energy had committed to converting the coal-fired units to alternate fuels by 2025 and completed converting H.A. Wagner's active coal-fired units to run on oil in 2024. However, in 2023, Talen announced they would retire the plant, despite grid operator PJM Interconnection finding that this "would adversely affect the reliability of the system." The plant will remain open until 2029 to maintain reliability in the Baltimore area while transmission upgrades are completed.

The station shares a 483-acre (195 ha) site adjacent to the Patapsco River with the Brandon Shores Generating Station. The Brandon Shores plant dominates the site with its 700-foot (210 m) exhaust and 400-foot (120 m) flue-gas desulfurization system stacks.

== History ==
The Wagner Generating Station's oil-fired Unit 1 commenced operations in 1956. Unit 2, consisting of a Babcock & Wilcox 1800 psig steam boiler and General Electric single reheat steam turbine, began operations as a coal-fired plant in 1959. It has since retired. Coal-fired Unit 3, which has a Babcock & Wilcox 3500 psig supercritical boiler and a Westinghouse double-reheat cross compound turbine, commenced operations in 1966 and now runs on oil. The oil-fired Unit 4 began operations in 1972. Units 2, 3, and 4 were also converted to use natural gas during startup operations in 1987. Additional air pollution controls were added to the plants in the 1980s.

The plant is named for Herbert Appleton Wagner (1867–1947), who was president of the Consolidated Gas and Electric of Baltimore, the predecessor company of Constellation Energy, from 1915 through 1942. Wagner also held a patent on a self-starting, single-phase motor and founded in 1891 the Wagner Electric Manufacturing Company in St. Louis, Missouri.

=== 2012 sale ===
The plant was originally constructed by a predecessor company of Constellation Energy, which was later purchased by Exelon in 2012. On August 9, 2012, Exelon announced that it had reached an agreement, subject to regulatory approvals, for the sale of the Charles P. Crane, Brandon Shores, and Herbert A. Wagner Generating Stations to Raven Power Holdings LLC, a newly formed portfolio company of Riverstone Holdings LLC, for approximately $400 million. Exelon had committed to divest the plants as condition for regulatory approval of its merger with Constellation Energy to alleviate concerns regarding potential market power in the regional wholesale electricity market. The sale was completed on November 30, 2012. When Riverstone Holdings executed a take-private transaction and became the majority owner of Talen in 2016, Brandon Shores, along with other Riverstone-owned generation assets, became part of the Talen portfolio. Following a strategic restructuring of Talen in 2023, it became a publicly traded company and was no longer privately owned by Riverstone.

=== Planned closure ===
On November 10, 2020 Talen Energy (parent company of Raven Power) announced a settlement with the Sierra Club that the plant would cease burning coal and convert to alternative energy sources by the end of 2025. However, in 2023, Talen announced they would instead retire the plant, despite grid operator PJM Interconnection finding that this "would adversely affect the reliability of the system."

On January 27, 2025, Talen announced that it, PJM Interconnection, L.L.C., and a broad coalition of the Maryland Public Service Commission, Maryland customers, and electric utilities, agreed on the terms by which Talen will operate its Brandon Shores and H.A. Wagner power plants until May 31, 2029, beyond their scheduled May 31, 2025 retirement dates. The agreement, called a “reliability-must-run” or “RMR” agreement, is intended to provide the power necessary to maintain grid and transmission reliability in and around the City of Baltimore until necessary transmission upgrades to provide reliable power to the area from other sources are complete. The RMR agreement was approved by FERC and Units 3 and 4 will continue to operate beyond this date until May 31, 2029.

== Cooling ==
All four Wagner units are cooled using water from intake structures from a basin on the Patapsco River using two circulating water pumps per unit. Water from units 1, 2, and 3 is returned to the river by a discharge canal upstream of the intake basin while water from unit 4 uses a discharge canal downstream of the intake basin.

== See also ==
- List of power stations in Maryland
