= Henderson Station One =

- Country: United States
- Location: Henderson, Kentucky
- Coordinates: 37.84°N 87.59°W
- Status: Decommissioned
- Commission date: 1956
- Decommission date: 2008
- Owner: City of Henderson

Thermal power station
- Primary fuel: Bituminous coal
- Cooling source: Ohio River

Power generation
- Units operational: 3
- Nameplate capacity: 44 MW

Henderson Station One (HMP&L One) was a coal-fired power station owned and operated by the city of Henderson, Kentucky.

Citing rising costs and mounting environmental regulations, Henderson Municipal Power and Light closed its 58-year-old Station One power plant on Water Street by December 31, 2008.

It has since been replaced by Henderson Station Two (HMP&L Two) as a part of Sebree Station.

== See also ==
- Coal mining in Kentucky
