= Hatfield's Ferry Power Station =

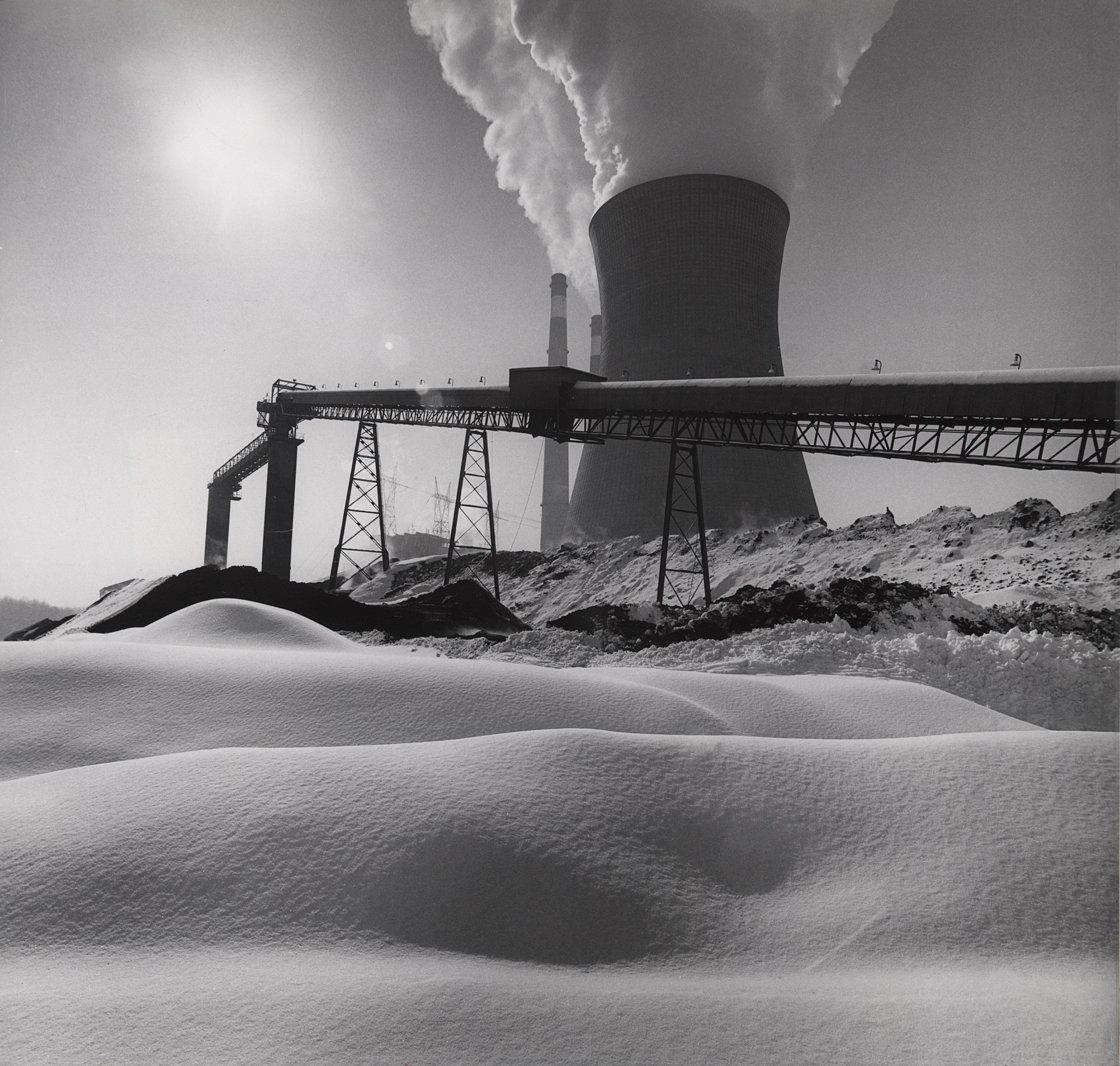
- Hatfield's Ferry Power Station in 1978
- Country: United States
- Location: Greene County, Pennsylvania
- Coordinates: 39°51′20″N 79°55′39″W
- Status: Decommissioned
- Commission date: 1969
- Decommission date: Units 1–3: October 9, 2013
- Owner: FirstEnergy
- Operator: FirstEnergy

Thermal power station
- Primary fuel: Coal
- Cooling source: Monongahela River

Power generation
- Nameplate capacity: 1,700 MW

External links
- Commons: Related media on Commons

Hatfield's Ferry Power Station was a 1.7-gigawatt (1,700 MW), coal power plant located in Greene County, Pennsylvania. The plant was operated by FirstEnergy. It began operations in 1969 and was shut down in 2013. The plant was eventually demolished in 2023.

== History ==
Hatfield's Ferry's construction commenced in 1963 and began generation in 1969 under the operations of Allegheny Energy. FirstEnergy assumed operations of Hatfield's Ferry following its merger with Allegheny Energy in 2010.

== Environmental mitigation ==
In the mid-1990s, Allegheny Energy installed a control system which reduced the plant's nitrogen oxide (NO_{x}) emissions. In 2001, Hatfield's Ferry added a natural gas reburn system. In that same year, Allegheny Energy introduced a passive treatment system where groundwater from the fly ash landfill is treated with wetlands. Allegheny Energy commissioned a flue-gas desulfurization (FGD) system, designed by Babcock & Wilcox, to be installed at Hatfield's Ferry in 2006. The equipment, which cost $700 million to install, removed 95% of sulfur dioxide (SO_{2}) and lowered mercury emissions at the plant when it was activated in 2009.

== Closure and future plans ==
On July 9, 2013, FirstEnergy announced they would be shutting down Hatfield's Ferry by October 9. The company decided against investing $245 million to retrofit Hatfield's Ferry in order to comply with the Environmental Protection Agency's (EPA) Mercury and Air Toxics Standards (MATS). In April 2017, FirstEnergy announced plans to sell part of the power plant site to APV Renaissance Partners Opco, a subsidiary of American Power Ventures LLC. In 2018 APV Renaissance received the final environmental permit required to break ground on a new 1,000-megawatt natural gas power plant on the site of the former coal pile. Completion of the project was expected by mid-2022. However, in June 2022 the Pittsburgh Post-Gazette cast doubt on the planned project, reporting that "the plan ultimately fell through." On March 4, 2023, three emissions stacks were demolished, and the remainder of the structures were demolished on November 17, 2023.

== See also ==
- List of power stations in Pennsylvania
