= Big Sandy Power Plant =

Natural gas power station in Louisa, Kentucky, United States

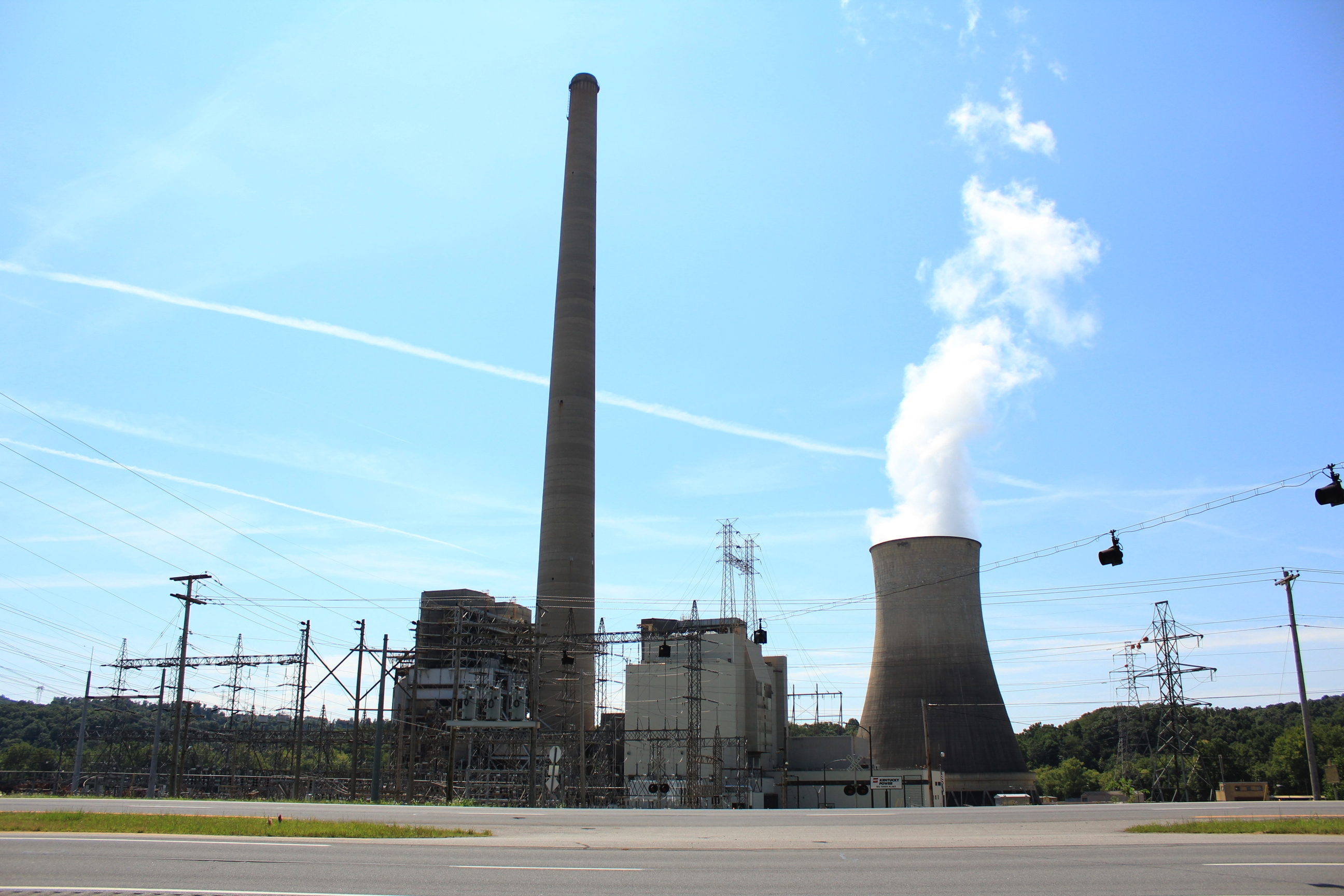
- Big Sandy Power Plant after its conversion to natural gas
- Country: United States
- Location: Lawrence County, near Louisa, Kentucky
- Coordinates: 38°10′20″N 82°37′03″W
- Status: Operational
- Commission date: Unit 1: 1963; Unit 2: 1969
- Decommission date: Unit 2: 2015
- Owner: Kentucky Power Company

Thermal power station
- Primary fuel: Natural gas
- Cooling source: Big Sandy River

Power generation
- Nameplate capacity: 1,097 MW

External links
- Commons: Related media on Commons

The Big Sandy Power Plant is a 268 megawatt (MW), natural gas power plant owned and operated by Kentucky Power Company, a subsidiary of American Electric Power (AEP), on the shores of the Big Sandy River near Louisa, Kentucky. It was established in 1963. It was formerly a coal-fired power plant, but was converted to natural gas in 2016.

== Plant Data ==
- Number of Employees: 135
- Customers: 175,000+

== Emissions Data ==
- 2006 CO_{2} Emissions: 6,830,275 tons
- 2006 SO_{2} Emissions: 46,476 tons
- 2006 SO_{2} Emissions per MWh:
- 2006 NO_{x} Emissions: 13,851 tons
- 2005 Mercury Emissions: 281 lb.

In January 2009, Sue Sturgis of the Institute of Southern Studies compiled a list of the 100 most polluting coal plants in the United States in terms of Coal Combustion Waste (CCW) stored in surface impoundments like the one involved in the TVA Kingston Fossil Plant coal ash spill. The data came from the EPA's Toxics Release Inventory (TRI) for 2006, the most recent year available.

Big Sandy Plant ranked number 40 on the list, with 915,079 pounds of coal combustion waste released to surface impoundments in 2006.

Big Sandy Plant's Fly Ash surface impoundment is on the EPA's official June 2009 list of Coal Combustion Residue (CCR) Surface Impoundments with High Hazard Potential Ratings. The rating applies to sites at which a dam failure would most likely cause loss of human life, but does not assess of the likelihood of such an event.

The data came from the EPA's Toxics Release Inventory (TRI) for 2006, the most recent year available.

== Conversion to natural gas ==
In 2011, Big Sandy's owner AEP announced plans to switch from coal to natural gas to reduce fuel costs, greenhouse gas emissions, and airborne toxins. In 2012, AEP proposed a billion dollar upgrade to allow it to continue to burn coal and asked Kentucky regulators to approve a 30 percent increase in electricity rates to pay for the work.

Conversion to natural gas was completed on May 30, 2016. The station's Unit 2 cooling tower was demolished via implosion on September 24, 2016.
