= Conemaugh Generating Station =

Coal power plant in Pennsylvania, US

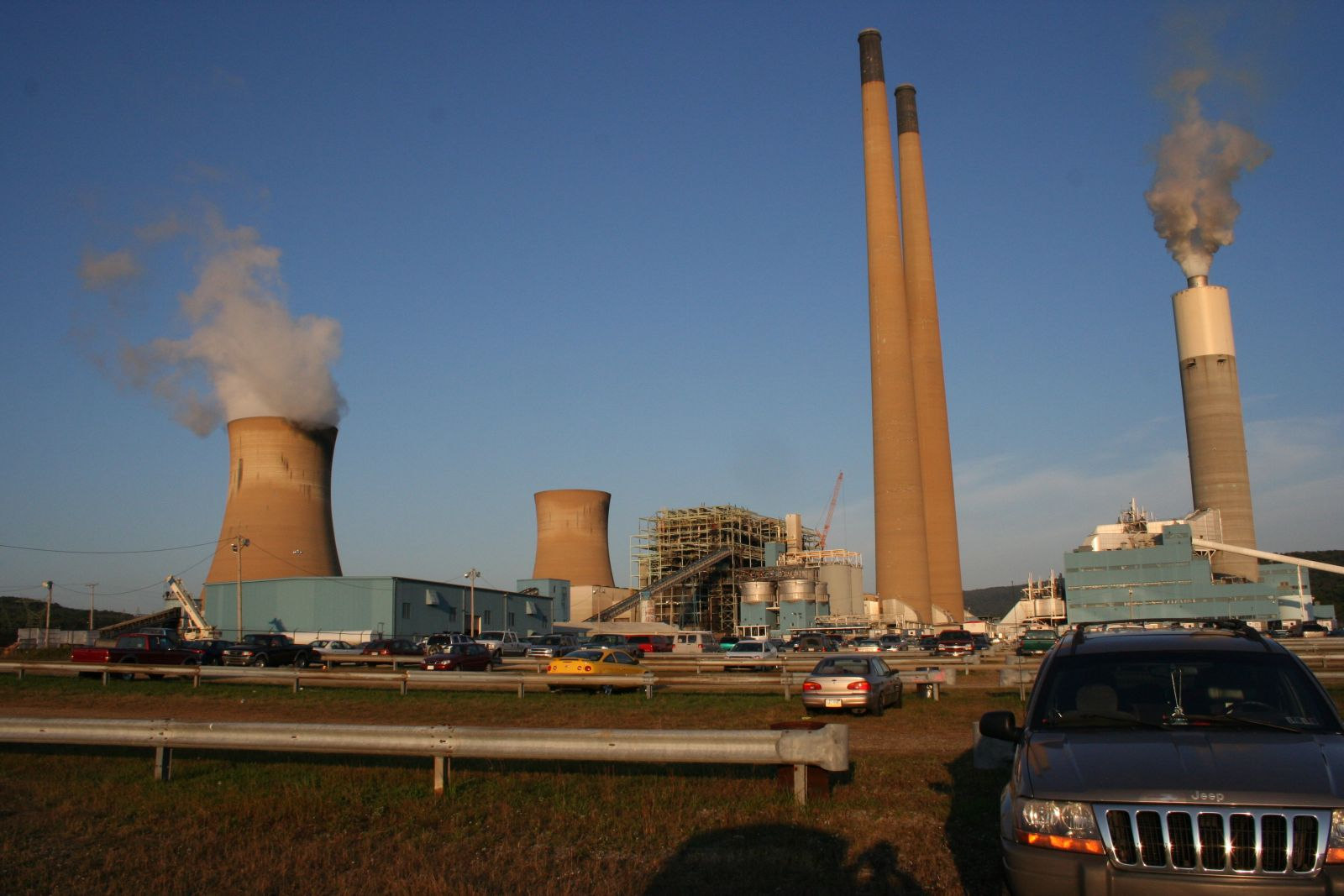
- Conemaugh Generating Station
- Country: United States
- Location: West Wheatfield Township, Indiana County, near New Florence, Pennsylvania
- Coordinates: 40°23′05″N 79°03′49″W
- Status: Operational
- Commission date: Unit 1: May, 1970; Unit 2: May, 1971
- Owners: PSEG Fossil, others

Thermal power station
- Primary fuel: Bituminous coal
- Secondary fuel: Coal synfuel
- Turbine technology: Steam turbine
- Cooling towers: 2 × Natural Draft
- Cooling source: Conemaugh River

Power generation
- Nameplate capacity: 1872 MW

External links
- Commons: Related media on Commons

The Conemaugh Generating Station is a 1,872 MW baseload coal-powered plant located on 1,750 acres (710 ha), across the Conemaugh River from New Florence in Western Pennsylvania. Track 3 of the Norfolk Southern Pittsburgh Line runs next to the power plant.

The power plant will close by or before December 31, 2028, as a result of a new federal wastewater rule that prohibits coal power plants from dumping toxic elements such as mercury, arsenic, and selenium into streams and rivers, along with the Keystone Generating Station and at least 24 other power plants in 14 states.

== Facility ==
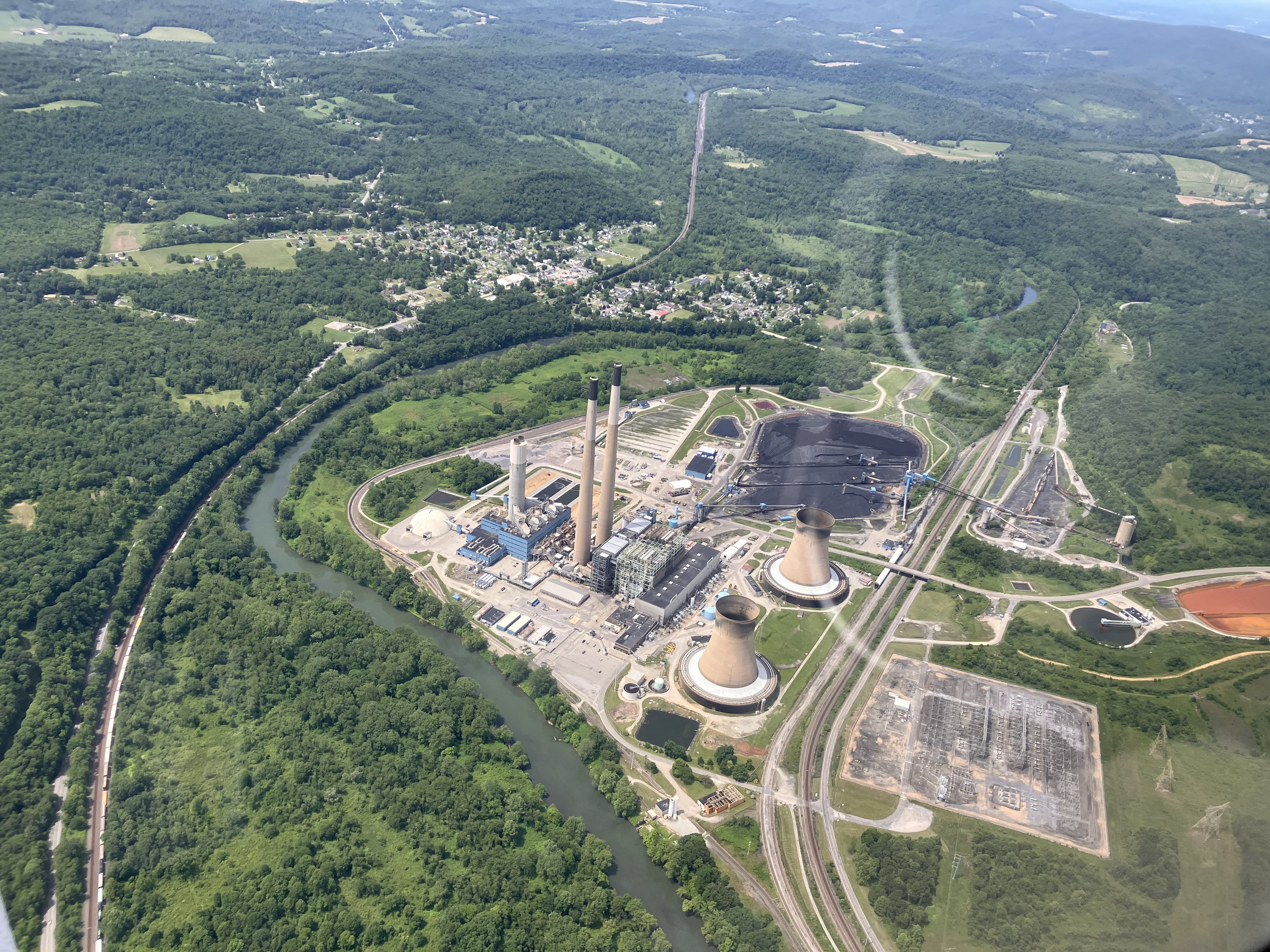
Power plant from 1000ft above the ground.

The station generates enough electricity to light 17 million 100-watt bulbs. The facility consists of two steam turbines, which began commercial operation in 1970 and 1971, and two cooling towers.

The main turbines run on steam produced by twin year-around 850 MWe boilers, each as tall as a 14-story building. The plant uses more than 4 million tons of coal each year. Conemaugh has two hyperbolic natural draft cooling towers which provide recirculating water to cool and condense the steam and to limit the amount of water needed from the river.

The plant is one of several in the area, situated near Pennsylvania deep mines and is basically a twin of the Keystone Generating Station, partially owned by PSEG Power.

=== Controlling emissions ===
To control air pollution emissions, the plant is equipped with electrostatic precipitators and low-NOx burners. A wet limestone flue-gas desulfurization system was installed in the mid 1990s. The plant donated a particularly scenic portion of the site, known locally as Buttermilk Falls, to Indiana County for use as a wildlife refuge.

== Company ==
The plant employs about 200 people and is one of the largest employers in Indiana County. It is a subsidiary of GenOn Energy Inc.

== Water pollution ==
In March 2011, PennEnvironment and the Sierra Club won a favorable court ruling finding that the plant had committed 8,684 violations of the Clean Water Act by discharging wastewater directly into the Conemaugh River. On June 6, 2011 GenOn agreed to a $5 million settlement with $3.75 million going toward the restoration of the river.

== See also ==
- List of power stations in Pennsylvania
