= Allegheny Energy =

US electrical utility company

Allegheny Energy, Inc.
- Type: Subsidiary of First Energy
- Industry: Utility
- Founded: January 31, 1907; 119 years ago (as West Penn Power)
- Defunct: February 6, 2011; 15 years ago
- Fate: bought by FirstEnergy
- Headquarters: Greensburg, Pennsylvania
- Area served: Maryland, Pennsylvania, Virginia, West Virginia
- Key people: Paul J. Evanson, Chairman and CEO
- Products: Electric power
- Revenue: ▲US$3.903 billion (FY 2010)
- Operating income: ▲US$931.5 million (FY 2010)
- Net income: ▲US$411.7 million (FY 2010)
- Total assets: ▲US$12.08 billion (FY 2010)
- Total equity: ▲US$3.442 billion (FY 2010)
- Number of employees: 4,211 (Dec. 2010)
- Website: www.alleghenyenergy.com

Allegheny Energy's service territory.

Allegheny Energy was an electric utility headquartered in Greensburg, Pennsylvania. It owned and operated electric generation facilities and delivered electric services to customers in Pennsylvania, West Virginia, Maryland, and Virginia. Allegheny Energy was incorporated in Maryland in 1925 as West Penn Electric Company. One of its predecessor companies dates back to the formation of West Penn Power on January 31, 1907.

The company had three primary businesses: "merchant generation," which operated power plants primarily in Pennsylvania and West Virginia; "transmission expansion;" and "utility operations," consisting of transmission and distribution operations serving 1.6 million customers, primarily in small towns and rural areas.

Allegheny merged with FirstEnergy in February 2011.

== Subsidiary companies ==
Allegheny Energy operated its electric distribution operations under the trade name Allegheny Power. Its regulated subsidiaries were West Penn Power (serving Southwestern and Central Pennsylvania), Monongahela Power ("Mon Power," serving Northern and Southern West Virginia, as well as Hancock and Brooke Counties in the Northern Panhandle), and the Potomac Edison Company (western Maryland, parts of eastern West Virginia, and (until 2010) northern Virginia). The electric generating plants were operated by subsidiary Allegheny Energy Supply Company and Monongahela Power.

In 1999, Monongahela Power purchased the distribution assets of West Virginia Power, a utility owned by UtiliCorp United based in Lewisburg, West Virginia. West Virginia Power's operations were centered on portions of southeastern West Virginia. It is said UtiliCorp sold the subsidiary to concentrate on its main operations in the midwestern US. UtiliCorp had purchased the division from Dominion Resources in 1986, of which it had operated as the West Virginia Power division of Virginia Electric & Power Company (VEPCO).

Allegheny Energy formerly operated in sections of eastern Ohio, until early 2006, when regulatory issues within Ohio forced them to sell the territory to Columbus Southern Power, a division of American Electric Power, Inc.

In 2010, Allegheny officially sold their Virginia service area. Counties west of the Blue Ridge Mountains were purchased by Shenandoah Valley Electric Cooperative of Mount Crawford, Virginia, while counties to the east were sold to Rappahannock Electric Cooperative of Fredericksburg, Virginia.

== Merger ==
In 1997, Allegheny and Duquesne Light Holding Company (DQE) agreed to a $4.3 billion merger with headquarters remaining in Hagerstown, Maryland. However DQE backed out of the deal by 1998.

In February 2010, Allegheny announced plans to merge with FirstEnergy. The merger was completed on February 25, 2011.

== Customer service ==
Allegheny Power was ranked number one in customer satisfaction among utilities in the northeastern United States in 2010, according to TQS Research. The recent recognition marks the sixth consecutive year large commercial and industrial customers rated Allegheny Power the region's top performer.

Southwestern Pennsylvania, excluding the city of Pittsburgh, provided about half of regulated utility revenues.

== Environmental policies, practice and record ==
Allegheny has indicated that its policy is "to produce and distribute electricity in a reliable and responsible manner that protects its personnel, communities, customers, and the environment."

In February 1995, the company signed a participation accord with the United States Department of Energy as a participant in the Climate Challenge Program. Under this accord, Allegheny Energy agreed to reduce its greenhouse gas emissions (as carbon dioxide equivalents) by two million tons per year by 2000. Through a series of reduction efforts including demand side management programs, heat-rate, and efficiency improvements on generation equipment, transportation alternatives, and land-use management involving forestation and vegetative sequestration efforts, Allegheny was able to achieve just under 8.5 million tons of carbon dioxide-equivalent reductions. These reductions fulfilled the company's Climate Challenge commitment goal by the calendar year 2000.

Carbon dioxide reduction efforts have continued since 2000, and Allegheny has since recorded another 9 million tons of avoided emissions through continued efficiency improvements, demand-side management measures, and vegetative sequestration.

The company complied with current sulfur dioxide emissions standards through a system-wide plan combining the use of emission controls, low sulfur fuel and emission allowances. Allegheny has taken steps to significantly reduce sulfur dioxide emissions at its generating facilities, investing $1.3 billion to install clean air technology at both the Hatfield's Ferry and Fort Martin power stations. With the addition of scrubbers at these plants, 85 percent of its coal-fired fleet now utilizes the best available controls for reducing sulfur dioxide emissions. Allegheny now has one of the cleanest fleets in the United States with respect to sulfur dioxide. The scrubber projects will also significantly reduce mercury emissions at these power stations.

== 2005 litigation ==
In 2005, New Jersey, New York, Pennsylvania, Connecticut, and Maryland filed suit in the United States District Court for the Western District of Pennsylvania against Allegheny Energy. The suit claimed that Allegheny Energy has made major upgrades at its Armstrong, Hatfield's Ferry, and Mitchell electric generating stations, having dramatically increased emissions without installing new pollution controls required by the Clean Air Act.

A trial was held in 2010. But in the five years that elapsed between the filing of the suit and the trial, the company's sulfur dioxide emissions profile improved significantly. The scrubbers at Fort Martin and Hatfield's Ferry, completed in 2009, removed approximately 95 percent of the sulfur dioxide emissions at those facilities, totaling more than 200,000 tons annually from the two plants. Mercury emissions at the facilities have also dropped significantly as result of the scrubbers. In 2014 the suit was dropped.

At the time the suit was filed, opponents claimed that the plants were emitting thousands of tons of pollution each year, including sulfur dioxide and nitrogen oxide emissions, which were allegedly wind-blown into New Jersey. They also claimed this causes smog, acid rain, and different respiratory disease. "New Jersey continues to pursue litigation to protect our citizens' health and meet clean air quality standards," Gov. Jon S. Corzine said. "This decision proves that New Jersey can and will pursue action to enforce the Clean Air Act's protections even when the federal government abdicates its own responsibility to do so." The 2005 suit claimed that three plants at issue in the litigation were at the time emitting in total hundreds of thousands of tons of pollutants a year. It also claimed that the three plants were putting out more nitrogen oxide emissions than all the power plants in New Jersey combined and more than three times the total amount of sulfur dioxide emissions emitted by all New Jersey power plants. The 2005 litigation also claimed that the Hatfield's Ferry plant was at that time the fifth largest single source of sulfur dioxide emissions in the country. The suit claimed violations of Pennsylvania's air pollution laws and regulations. New Jersey sought injunctive relief to require Allegheny to reduce its harmful emissions by installing up to date pollution controls at each of the three plants. The states also asked the court to apply penalties and order Allegheny to take additional appropriate actions to make up for the harm done to public health and the environment by its violations of federal and state law.

== See also ==
- Logans Ferry Mine Tunnel built by West Penn Power (Pennsylvania), a predecessor company
