= George F. Weaton Power Station =

Power station in Pennsylvania, USA

George F Weaton Power Station
- Country: United States
- Location: Potter Township, Beaver County, Pennsylvania
- Coordinates: 40°40′2.24″N 80°20′46.03″W
- Status: Decommissioned
- Commission date: 1958
- Decommission date: 2012
- Construction cost: $30 Million USD
- Owner: Horsehead Corporation

Thermal power station
- Primary fuel: Sub-bituminous coal
- Turbine technology: Steam turbine
- Cooling source: Ohio River

Power generation
- Units operational: 2
- Nameplate capacity: 110 MW

The George F. Weaton Power Station was a coal-fired power plant located in Potter Township, Beaver County, Pennsylvania, along the Ohio River. It was formerly owned by Horsehead Corporation and was completed in 1958 by Kaiser Engineers, later ICF International, at a cost of $30 million. Although the primary purpose of the plant was to supply power to the company's nearby zinc-smelting operation, excess electricity could be sold to the local grid market via the site's 138,000- and 69,000-volt transmission lines, owned and operated by Duquesne Light. The power plant itself consisted of two 375,000 lb/h Combustion Engineering steam generators, two 55-megawatt Westinghouse tandem compound double-flow steam turbines, and two 65-megawatt Westinghouse generators. The plant was idled in September 2011 and officially closed in July 2012, after more than 50 years of service.

== History ==
The George F. Weaton station went online in May 1958, after around 6 years of construction, under the ownership of Horsehead Corporation's predecessor, St. Joe Lead. Its namesake, George Frederic Weaton, was the former manager of the company's Monaca site and the man assigned to oversee the construction of the power plant. Weaton died shortly after the power plant was completed, and a photograph of him turning one of the turbine throttle valves during its initial roll still hung in the main office stairwell until the plant's closure. The plant was originally intended to supply power to the zinc smelter without an interconnection to the local power grid and, as such, was black-start capable. One 1.125-megawatt alternating-current diesel generator and one 100-kilowatt direct current diesel generator were installed for this purpose, as well as to supply power to the plant during emergency tripout situations. Coal was brought to the plant by barge, and was offloaded with a grab-bucket barge unloader.

A unique feature of the station was its relatively high tolerance for phase unbalance situations, necessary due to the use of two-phase furnaces in the zinc smelter conflicting with the power plant's generation of three-phase alternating current. The plant was originally intended to house two 55 MW generators, but larger generators capable of handling a higher degree of phase unbalance were deemed necessary. The final solution was to install 65 MW generators on the originally planned 55 MW turbines. Switches were later installed in the power plant's control room that gave operators the ability to remotely trip the smelter's furnaces during severe phase unbalances in order to prevent damage to the generators or the plant's auxiliary equipment.

Originally designed with only one mechanical cyclone system and two electrostatic precipitators per unit to reduce emissions, an additional three electrostatic precipitators were added to each unit in the mid-1970s to comply with stricter pollution regulations. An experimental citrate scrubber system, co-funded by the United States Bureau of Mines and St. Joe, and intended to extract sulfur from the plant's flue gas, was installed on Unit 1 in the late 1970s, but was used intermittently for only three years.

Power plant operations were reduced to just one unit in late 1979 after the zinc smelter temporarily closed, but returned to two-unit operation when the smelter reopened in 1980. In 2004, the plant was leased by Horsehead to Cinergy Solutions, Inc., of Cincinnati, which was later acquired by Duke Energy. Cinergy introduced the practice of selling excess power not needed for the smelting operation on the US energy market, typically in the PJM Interconnection. Cinergy also discontinued the use of eastern bituminous coal at the G.F. Weaton Station in favor of cheaper, low-sulfur sub-bituminous coal from the Powder River Basin in Wyoming, a practice which remained after their lease of the plant ended. Horsehead regained control of the facility's operations from Duke in late 2006 and retained it until its closure.

== Final years and closure ==
The plant's final years under Horsehead were marked by several major accidents, including the failure of both units' main turbine-generator bearings during a loss of auxiliary power, the explosion of one of the plant's two 138,000-volt substations, the rupture of a high-pressure auxiliary steam line, several coal-pulverizer explosions, and a large electrical explosion resulting from a no-load electrical disconnect mistakenly being opened under full load. The generating capacity of the plant had been reduced to approximately 50% by 2011, due to the company's lack of funding for routine plant outages and maintenance, as well as the low-energy-content, high-moisture coal which had been used at the facility since 2010. On June 30, 2011, Horsehead announced that operations at the station would be idled indefinitely, citing the rising costs of producing power at the facility and a new deal to purchase power for its zinc-smelting operation from FirstEnergy. Units 1 and 2 were shut down on September 10 and 11, 2011, respectively, and most of the hourly workforce was laid off or transferred on September 14. It was later announced after several months of speculation that the company planned to complete a new zinc smelter in North Carolina by 2013 to replace the aging Monaca site.

== Current status ==
Horsehead officially changed the status of the G.F. Weaton Station from "idle" to "closed" in July 2012. The station was demolished in 2014–2015, along with Horsehead's nearby zinc smelter, in anticipation of the property's purchase by Shell Chemicals. Shell has proposed the construction of an ethane cracker plant on the site.

== See also ==
- List of power stations in Pennsylvania
