= Charles P. Crane Generating Station =

Coal power plant

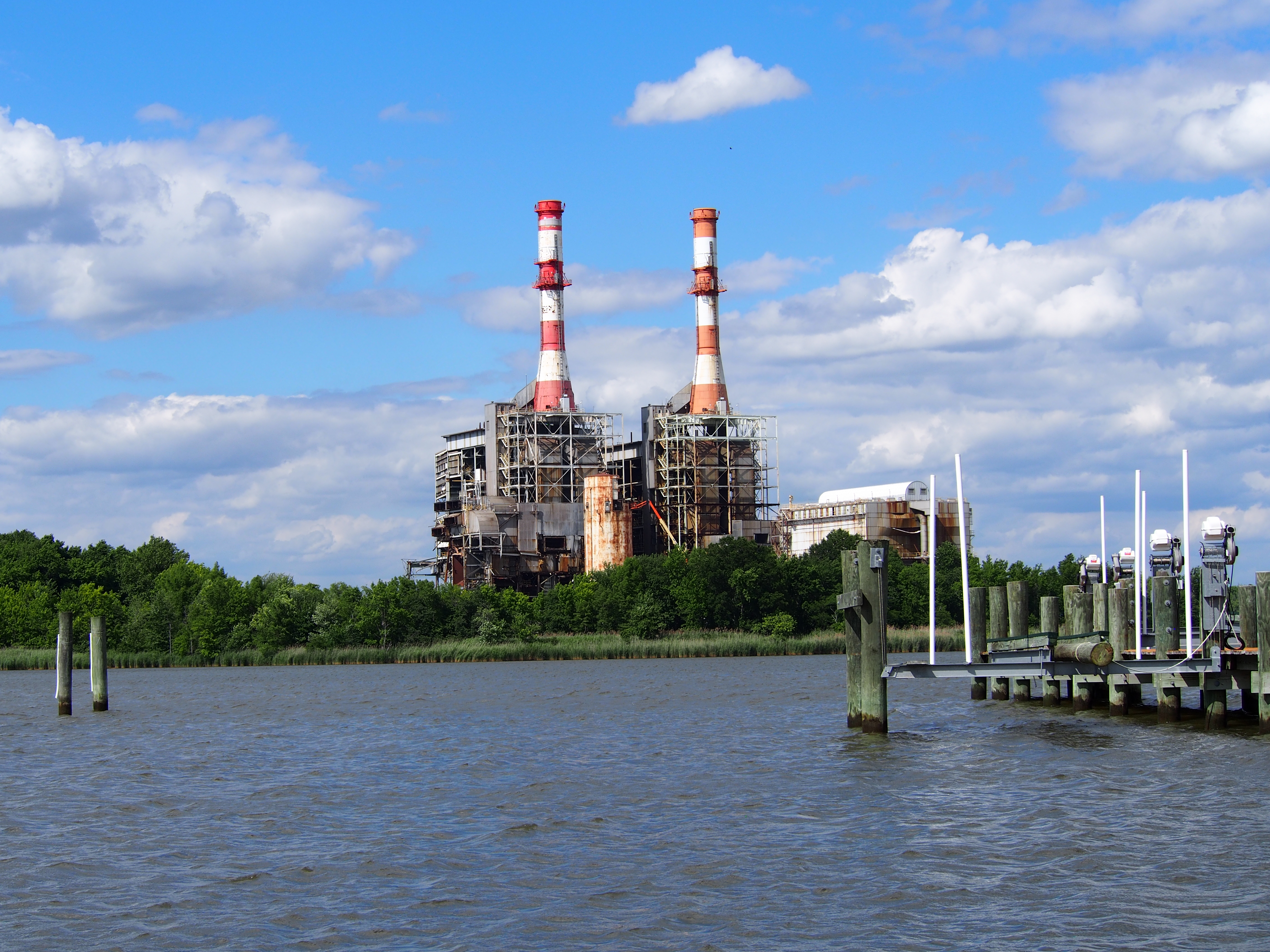
- Crane Generating Station in 2022
- Country: United States
- Location: Bowleys Quarters, Maryland
- Coordinates: 39°19′25″N 76°21′59″W
- Status: Demolished
- Commission date: Unit 1: July, 1961; Unit 2: February, 1963
- Decommission date: Units 1–2: June 1, 2018
- Owner: Avenue Capital Group

Thermal power station
- Primary fuel: Bituminous coal
- Secondary fuel: Fuel oil
- Turbine technology: Steam turbine
- Cooling source: Seneca Creek (Gunpowder River)

Power generation
- Nameplate capacity: 400 MW

The Charles P. Crane Generating Station was a 400 megawatt (MW) coal power plant located on the Carroll Island Road in Bowleys Quarters, Maryland, 14 miles (23 km) east of Baltimore. The power plant was operated by C.P. Crane, LLC, a subsidiary of Avenue Capital Group. The station had two coal-fired generating units, rated at 190 and 209 MW nominal capacity, and powered by cyclone steam boilers. It also had a 16 MW oil-fired combustion turbine. The Crane station occupies 157 acres (64 ha) on the Middle River Neck Peninsula adjacent to the Seneca Creek tributary of the Gunpowder River, and is on the rural side of the Baltimore County Urban Rural Demarcation Line. The plant was closed in June 2018 and demolished via building implosion in August 2022.

== Coal delivery ==
Coal was delivered to the generating station by a dedicated rail spur used by the Norfolk Southern Railway that connects to Amtrak's Northeast Corridor line. Regulatory approval to construct facilities allowing delivery by barge using a dredged channel from the Chesapeake Bay was granted in 2006. The cyclone boilers required the use of medium-sulfur, low-fusion coal, which was supplied mainly using North Appalachian Pittsburgh Seam 8 coal. The station used approximately 950,000 tons of coal each year.

== History ==
The two cyclone boiler units were originally oil-fired. Unit 1 went into operation in 1961 and unit 2 in 1963. These two units were initially fueled by eastern bituminous coal, then modified to use fuel oil as their primary fuel following an order by the Department of Energy under the Energy Supply and Environmental Coordination Act of 1974. They were then converted back to coal in 1980, with the addition of the second and third utility sized baghouses in the US, the first being at Brunner Island Steam Electric Station.

The station was named for Charles P. Crane, who from 1950 to 1957 was president of the Baltimore Gas and Electric Company, the predecessor company of Constellation Energy, and its chairman from 1955 to 1961.

=== 2012 sale ===
On August 9, 2012, Exelon announced that it had reached an agreement, subject to regulatory approvals, for the sale of the Charles P. Crane, Brandon Shores, and Herbert A. Wagner Generating Stations to Raven Power Holdings LLC, a newly formed portfolio company of Riverstone Holdings LLC. Exelon had committed to divest the plants as condition for regulatory approval of its merger with Constellation Energy to alleviate concerns regarding potential market power in the regional wholesale electricity market. The sale was completed on November 30, 2012.

=== Talen Energy and 2016 sale ===
Talen Energy assumed ownership of the plant on June 1, 2015, when the company was established as the combination of Riverstone Holdings, LLC with PPL Corporation's spun off power generation business. As a condition of the merger, Talen was required by FERC to sell about 1,300 MW of generation in the PJM region to avoid dominating the market. Talen announced on October 23, 2015, that the C.P. Crane plant would be sold in early 2016 to an affiliate of Avenue Capital Group as one of its divestitures to fulfill the FERC order. The sale was completed on February 16, 2016, at which time the plant began operating as C.P. Crane, LLC.

=== Closure ===
Crane's owners filed a deactivation notice with PJM Interconnection in November 2016. The plant was closed on June 1, 2018. Although the owners considered retrofitting the plant with natural gas generators, these plans were abandoned in 2022 in favor of demolition. The plant was imploded on August 19, 2022, after which its owners proposed a plan to build 285 townhouses on the site of the plant. Baltimore County councilmember David Marks, whose district included the plant, proposed turning the area into a park, which began to gain support from other area politicians, including U.S. representative Dutch Ruppersberger and Baltimore County executive Johnny Olszewski. In September 2024, the county council unanimously voted to use $10 million in state open space funds to purchase the area with intentions to develop it into a park.

== See also ==
- List of power stations in Maryland
