= List of power stations in Nebraska =

Sources of Nebraska utility-scale electricity generation in gigawatt-hours, full-year 2025:
1. Coal: 18,332 (45.6%)
2. Wind: 11,706 (29.1%)
3. Nuclear: 6,922 (17.2%)
4. Natural gas: 1,585 (3.94%)
5. Hydroelectric: 1,265 (3.15%)
6. Solar: 255 (0.63%)
7. Biomass: 73 (0.18%)
8. Petroleum: 70 (0.17%)

This is a list of electricity-generating power stations in the U.S. state of Nebraska, sorted by type and name. In 2024, Nebraska had a total summer capacity of 10.9 GW through all of its power plants, and a net generation of 37,229 GWh. In 2025, the electrical energy generation mix was 45.6% coal, 29.1% wind, 17.2% nuclear, 3.9% natural gas, 3.2% hydroelectric, 0.6% solar, 0.2% biomass, and 0.2% petroleum. Distributed small-scale solar, including customer-owned photovoltaic panels, delivered 63 GWh to the state's electricity grid in 2025.

Nebraska is the only state where all electricity utilities are publicly owned as municipal systems, public districts, or rural cooperatives. The state has few fossil-fuel reserves but has abundant renewable generation and agricultural resources. It is an increasing harvester of wind energy and a major producer of biofuels (primarily ethanol), with further potential for biomass generation. Nebraska has no renewable portfolio standard while supporting net metering. It was a top-ten state for per-capita energy consumption in 2019 due in large part to its energy-intensive agriculture, meat packing, and food processing industries. About 10% more electricity was generated than was consumed in-state.

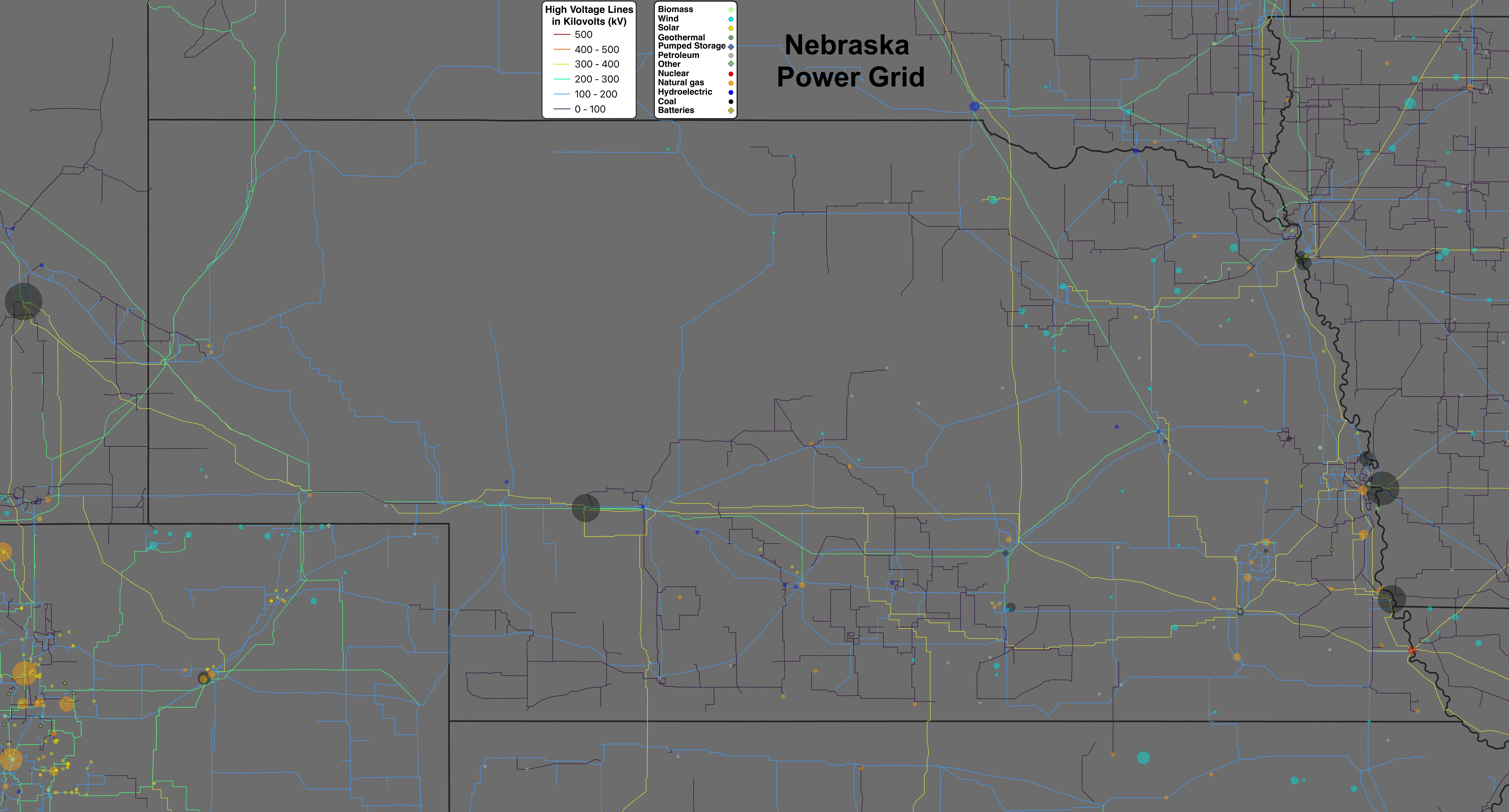
Nebraska power grid

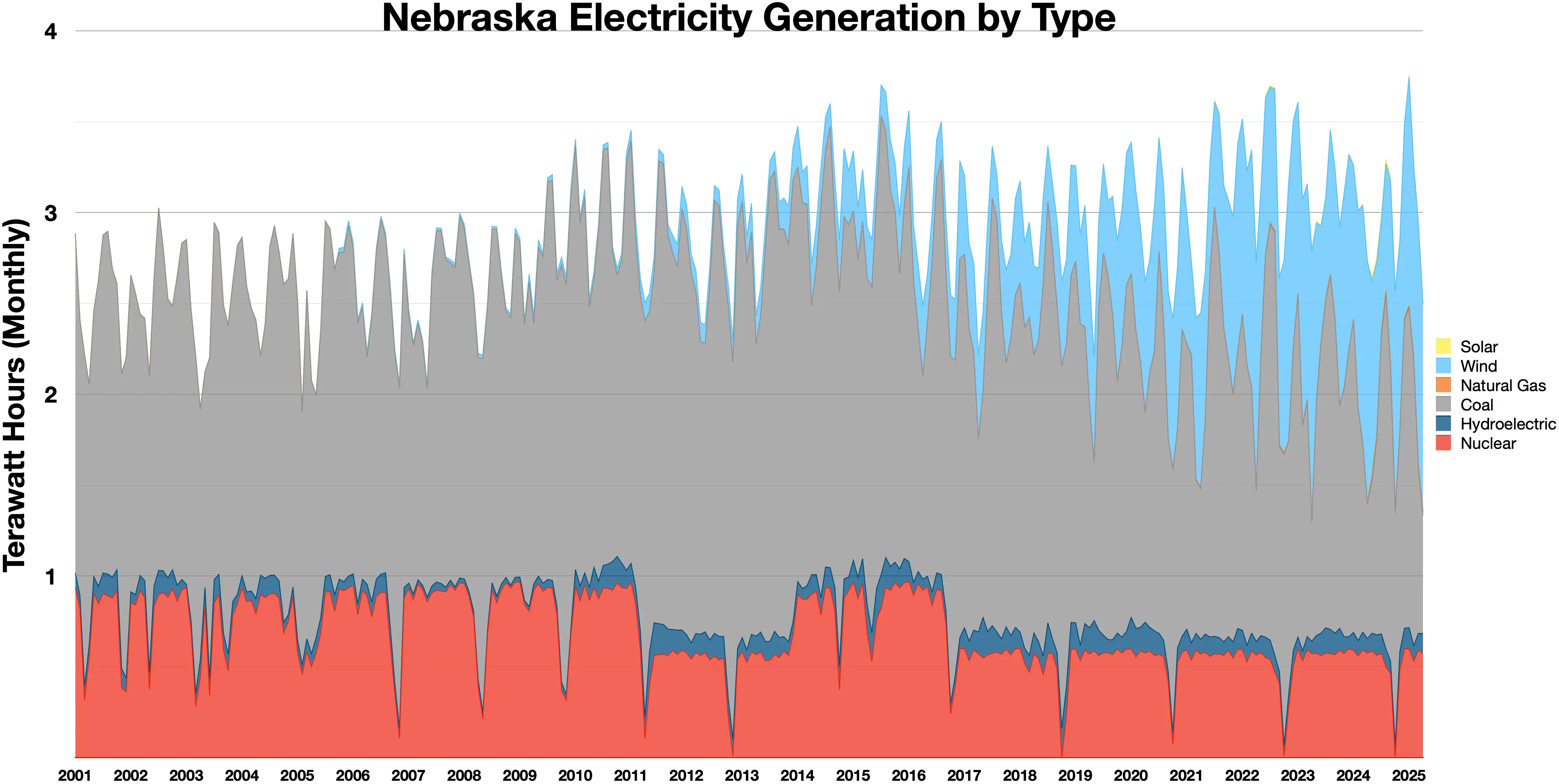
Nebraska electricity generation by type

== Nuclear power stations ==
Plant	Operator	County	Coordinates	Capacity (MW)	Generation type	Year opened	Year closed	Ref
Cooper Nuclear Station	NPPD	Nemaha	40°21′46″N 95°38′27″W	770	Steam turbine	1974	Currently operating	
Fort Calhoun Nuclear Generating Station	OPPD	Washington	40°21′46″N 95°38′27″W	480	Steam turbine	1973	2016	
Hallam Nuclear Power Facility	Atomics International	Lancaster	40°21′46″N 95°38′27″W	75	Steam turbine	1963	1964	

== Fossil-fuel power stations ==
Data from the U.S. Energy Information Administration serves as a general reference.

=== Coal ===
Plant	Operator	County	Coordinates	Capacity (MW)	Year opened	Ref
ADM Columbus	ADM	Platte	41°24′59″N 97°17′11″W	61	2010	
ADM Lincoln	ADM	Lancaster	40°51′59″N 96°36′52″W	7.9	1988	
Gerald Gentleman Station	NPPD	Lincoln	41°04′51″N 101°08′27″W	1362.6	1979 (Unit 1 - 681.3MW); 1982 (Unit 2 - 681.3MW)	
Lon D. Wright Power Plant	City of Fremont	Dodge	41°25′41″N 96°27′44″W	128.5	1957 (Unit 1 - 15.5MW); 1963 (Unit 2 - 21.0MW); 1976 (Unit 3 - 82.0MW)	
Nebraska City Power Station	OPPD	Otoe	40°37′17″N 95°46′35″W	1345.3	1979 (Unit 1 - 654.3MW); 2009 (Unit 2 - 691.0MW)	
North Omaha Power Station	OPPD	Douglas	41°19′45″N 95°56′41″W	336.3	1954 (Unit 1 - 64.8MW); 1957 (Unit 2 - 90.8MW); 1959 (Unit 3 - 86.0MW); 1963 (Unit 4 - 120.1MW); 1968 (Unit 5 - 216.2MW)	
Platte Generating Station	City of Grand Island	Hall	40°51′17″N 98°20′54″W	100	1982	
Sheldon Power Station	NPPD	Lancaster	40°33′32″N 96°47′05″W	219	1961 (Unit 1 - 104.0MW); 1965 (Unit 2 - 115.0MW)	
Western Sugar Cooperative Scottsbluff	Western Sugar Cooperative	Scotts Bluff	41°51′32″N 103°38′04″W	5.0	1987	
Whelan Energy Center	PPGA	Adams	40°34′51″N 98°18′45″W	309	1981 (Unit 1 - 77.0MW); 2011 (Unit 2 - 232.0MW)	

=== Natural gas ===
Name	Operator	County	Coordinates	Capacity (MW)	Generation type	Year opened	Ref
Auburn	Auburn Power Board	Nemaha	40°23′18″N 95°50′47″W	17.5	Reciprocating engine (x6)	1949-1993	
Beatrice Power Station	NPPD	Gage	40°19′52″N 96°48′30″W	220	3x1 combined cycle	2005	
Broken Bow	City of Broken Bow	Custer	41°24′11″N 99°38′21″W	7.2	Reciprocating engine (x4)	1974	
C.W. Burdick Power Plant	City of Grand Island	Hall	40°55′22″N 98°19′37″W	81.6	Simple cycle (x3)	1968/2003	
Canaday Station	NPPD	Gosper	40°41′39″N 99°42′04″W	99.3	Steam turbine	1958	
Cass County	OPPD	Cass	40°56′52″N 95°57′50″W	322.8	Simple cycle (x2)	2003	
Don Henry	City of Hastings	Adams	40°35′00″N 98°25′12″W	18.0	Simple cycle	1972	
Falls City	Falls City Utility Department	Richardson	40°03′18″N 95°36′30″W	26.7	Reciprocating engine (x7)	1946-2018	
J Street	LES	Lancaster	40°48′28″N 96°42′39″W	29.0	Simple cycle	1972	
Lon Wright (Derril Marshall Generating Station)	City of Fremont	Dodge	41°25′41″N 96°28′00″W	38.0	Simple cycle	2003	
Nebraska City #1	City of Nebraska City	Otoe	40°40′50″N 95°50′51″W	21.6	Reciprocating engine (x6)	1955-1979	
Nebraska City #2	City of Nebraska City	Otoe	40°39′58″N 95°52′06″W	7.6	Reciprocating engine (x2)	1998	
North Denver	City of Hastings	Adams	40°35′56″N 98°23′19″W	41.0	Steam turbine (x2)	1957/1967	
North Omaha	OPPD	Douglas	41°19′45″N 95°56′41″W	241.6	Steam turbine (x3)	1954-1959	
Rokeby	LES	Lancaster	40°43′54″N 96°44′11″W	255.1	Simple cycle (x3)	1975/1997/2001	
Sarpy County	OPPD	Sarpy	41°10′14″N 95°58′14″W	314.9	Simple cycle (x5)	1972/1996/2000	
Standing Bear Lake Station	OPPD	Douglas	41°18′58″N 96°05′44″W	150	Reciprocating engine (x9)	2025	
Terry Bundy Generating Station	LES	Lancaster	40°54′35″N 96°36′47″W	121.9	3x1 combined cycle, simple cycle	2004 (77.4MW); 2003 (45.5MW)	
Turtle Creek Station	OPPD	Sarpy	41°05′45″N 96°10′07″W	450	Simple cycle (x3)	2025	
Wahoo	City of Wahoo	Saunders	41°12′42″N 96°36′42″W	13.2	Reciprocating engine (x5)	1947-1973	

=== Petroleum ===
Plant	Operator	County	Coordinates	Capacity (MW)	Generation type	Year opened	Ref
Hebron	NPPD	Thayer	40°11′16″N 97°34′40″W	41.5	Simple cycle	1973	
Jones Street	OPPD	Douglas	41°15′05″N 95°55′22″W	122.6	Simple cycle (x2)	1973	
Kimball Municipal Power Plant	City of Kimball	Kimball	41°14′18″N 103°40′00″W	7.6	Reciprocating engine (x6)	1944-1974	
McCook	NPPD	Red Willow	40°13′17″N 100°39′03″W	42.7	Simple cycle	1973	
Ord	Loup Power District	Valley	41°36′15″N 98°55′34″W	10.8	Reciprocating engine (x5)	1963-1997	
Tecumseh	City of Tecumseh	Johnson	40°21′59″N 96°11′24″W	6.6	Reciprocating engine (x5)	1944-1974	
Wayne	City of Wayne	Wayne	42°13′40″N 97°01′06″W	20.2	Reciprocating engine (x8)	1947-1998	

== Renewable power stations ==
Data from the U.S. Energy Information Administration serves as a general reference.

=== Biomass ===
Name	Location	Coordinates	Capacity (MW)	Fuel type	Generation type	Year opened	Ref
Elk City Station	Douglas County	41°23′02″N 96°15′16″W	6.4	Landfill gas	Reciprocating engine (x8)	2002/2006	
Missouri River WWTP	Douglas County	41°12′12″N 95°55′45″W	3.0	Biogas	Reciprocating engine (x3)	1985/2001	
Papillion Creek WWTP	Sarpy County	41°04′38″N 95°52′12″W	1.5	Biogas	Reciprocating engine (x3)	1987	
Terry Bundy GS	Lancaster County	40°54′35″N 96°36′47″W	4.8	Landfill gas	Reciprocating engine (x3)	2014	

=== Geothermal ===
There were no utility-scale geothermal power facilities in the state of Nebraska in 2019.

=== Hydroelectric ===
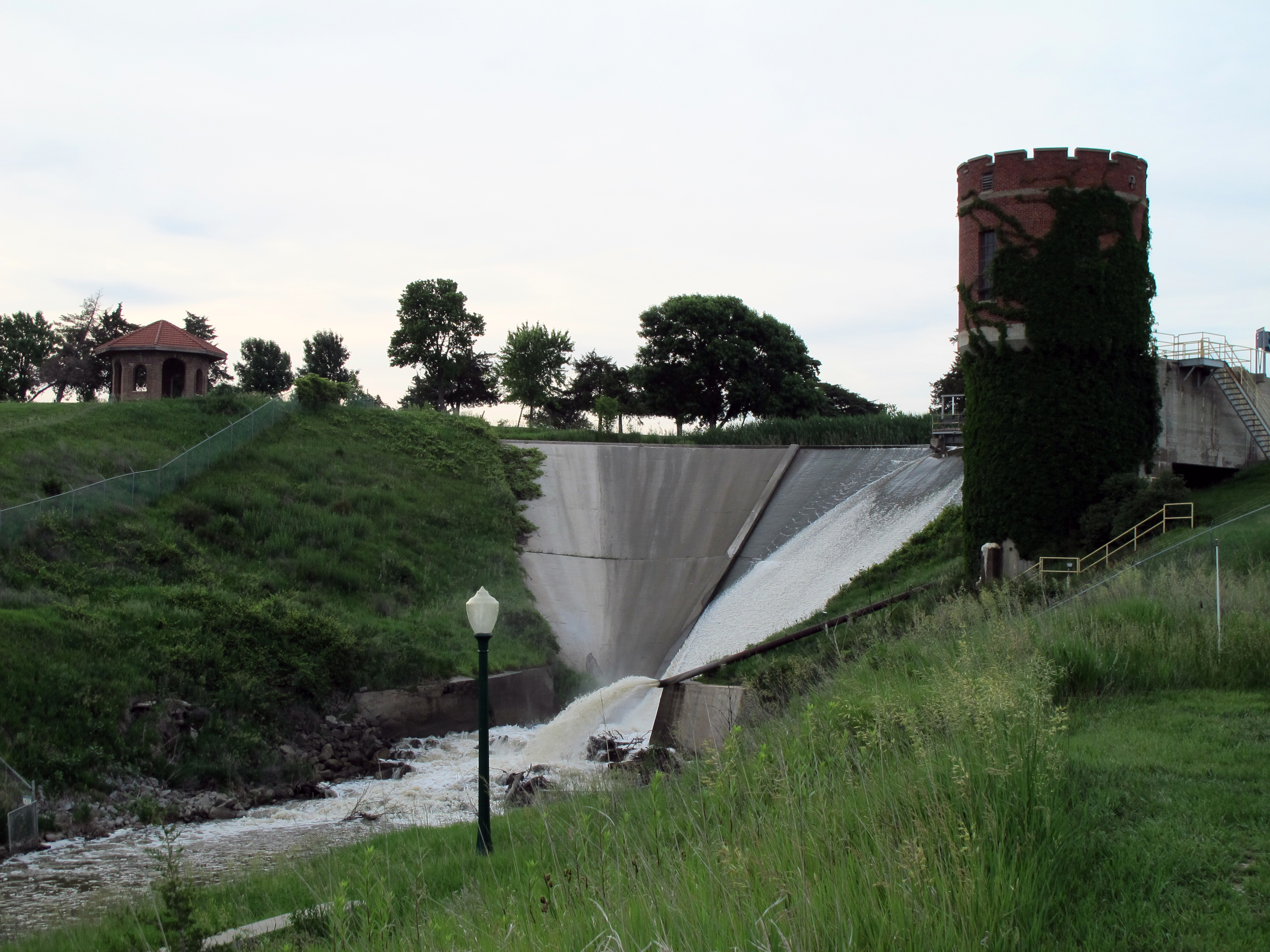
Kearney canal and dam, Nebraska's oldest hydroelectric dam since 1886.^{[A]} The facility was upgraded to include the circular tower powerhouse in 1921.

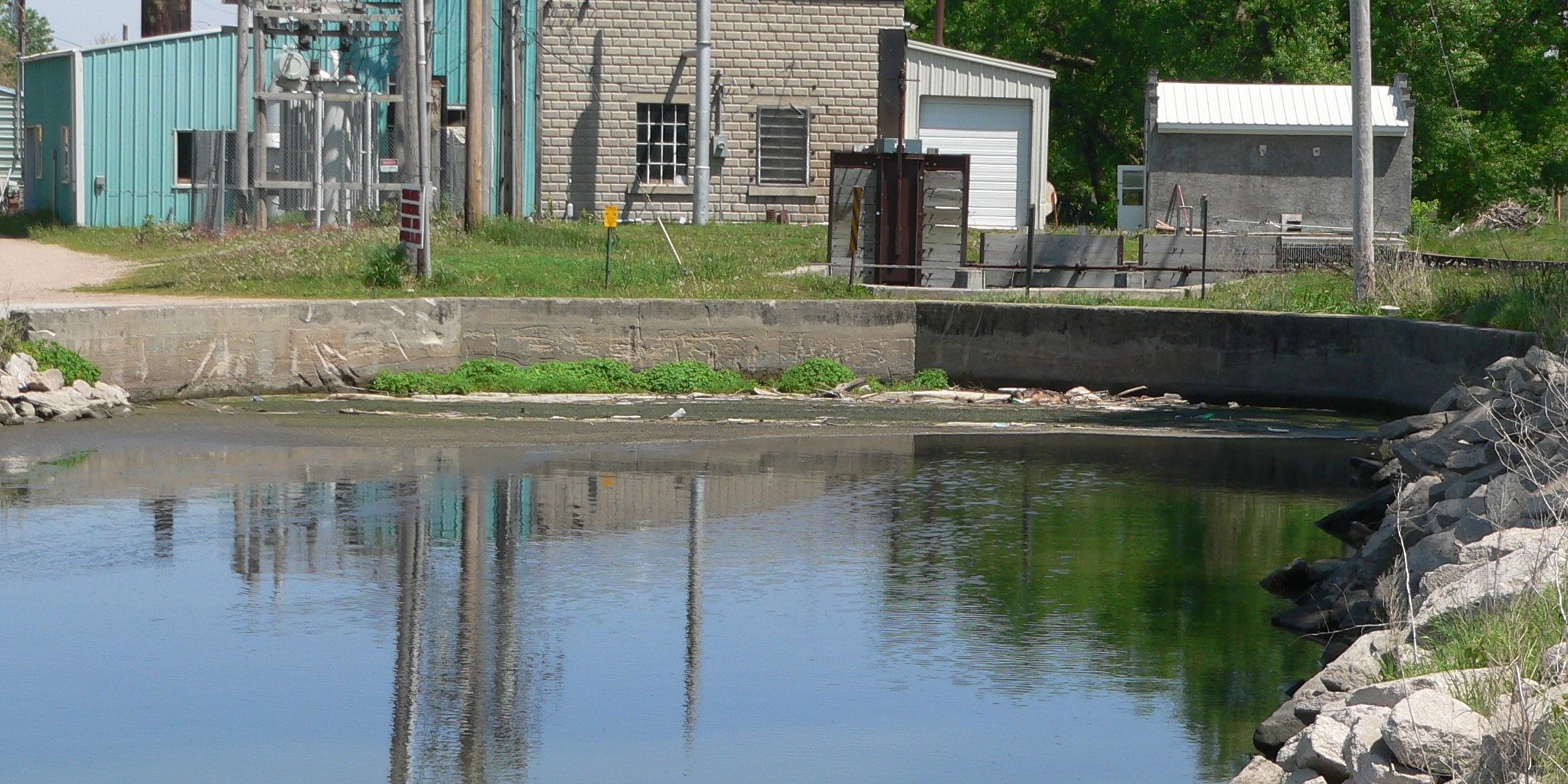
Spalding sluice gate, headrace and powerhouse components of Nebraska's longest continuously operating power plant since 1919

Plant	Location	Coordinates	Capacity (MW)	Number of turbines	Year opened	Ref
Columbus	Platte County	41°27′50″N 97°19′42″W	45.0	3	1936	
Gavins Point	Cedar County	42°50′56″N 97°28′53″W	102.0	3	1956	
Jeffrey	Lincoln County	40°57′34″N 100°23′52″W	21.0	2	1941	
Johnson 1	Gosper County	40°41′37″N 99°49′04″W	20.0	2	1941	
Johnson 2	Gosper County	40°41′02″N 99°44′41″W	22.5	1	1941	
Kearney^{[A]}	Buffalo County	40°42′13″N 99°06′03″W	1.0	1	1921	
Kingsley	Keith County	41°12′41″N 101°40′05″W	41.0	1	1984	
Monroe	Platte County	41°29′14″N 97°36′28″W	3.0	3	1936	
North Platte	Lincoln County	41°05′11″N 100°45′34″W	24.0	2	1935	
Spalding	Greeley County	41°40′53″N 98°22′03″W	0.2	2	1919/1956	

^{A} Kearney canal and dam were completed in 1886, water powered a DC current dynamo by 1889, and an elegant brick powerhouse was constructed in 1890 that also housed a steam engine along with an 800 horsepower turbine. The early system delivered lighting to the city of Kearney and powered a trolley system, but suffered from various equipment and water-delivery issues that persisted after the shift to AC alternating current. Major reworking of bulkhead, penstock and powerhouse components were completed in 1921. The historic powerhouse was ultimately demolished in 2007.

=== Solar ===
Project name	Location	Coordinates	Capacity (MW_{AC})	Year opened	Ref
City of Lexington	Dawson County	40°45′25″N 99°44′02″W	3.6	2017	
Fort Calhoun	Washington County	41°31′14″N 96°04′39″W	5.0	2019	
Hastings	Adams County	40°36′07″N 98°26′13″W	1.5	2019	
Holdrege	Lancaster County	40°49′29″N 96°49′13″W	4.0	2016	
Kearney	Buffalo County	40°43′18″N 99°02′28″W	5.8	2017	
Lon Wright	Dodge County	41°25′41″N 96°27′44″W	2.3	2018	
Platteview Solar	Saunders County	41°11′27″N 96°22′43″W	81	2024	
South Sioux City	Dakota County	42°27′31″N 96°26′23″W	2.3	2016	

=== Wind ===
Additional data reported by the United States Wind Turbine Database
Project name	Location	Coordinates	Capacity (MW)	Number of turbines	Year opened	Ref
Ainsworth Wind	Brown County	42°26′56″N 99°53′30″W	59.4	43	2005	
Broken Bow Wind	Custer County	41°27′17″N 99°34′05″W	152.9	50	2012/2014	
Cottonwood Wind	Webster County	40°14′25″N 98°24′22″W	89.7	40	2017	
Crofton Bluffs Wind	Knox County	42°41′54″N 97°34′48″W	40.0	22	2012	
Elkhorn Ridge Wind	Knox County	42°41′52″N 97°37′08″W	81.0	27	2009	
Flat Water Wind	Richardson County	40°00′04″N 95°55′44″W	60.0	40	2010	
Grande Prairie Wind Farm	Holt County	42°36′29″N 98°25′42″W	400.0	200	2016	
Kimball Wind	Kimball County	41°16′25″N 103°41′54″W	30.0	12	2018	
Laredo Ridge Wind	Boone County	41°52′49″N 98°01′26″W	79.9	54	2011	
Lon Wright Wind	Dodge County	41°25′41″N 96°27′44″W	40.9	19	2017	
Prairie Breeze Wind	Antelope County	41°57′06″N 98°04′36″W	215.7	179	2014/2015/2016	
Rattlesnake Creek Wind	Dixon County	42°22′26″N 96°49′44″W	318.1	101	2019	
Sholes Wind	Wayne County	42°18′43″N 97°21′53″W	160.0	71	2019	
Steele Flats Wind	Jefferson County	40°02′56″N 96°57′44″W	74.8	44	2013	
TPW Petersburg Wind	Boone County	41°51′53″N 97°57′40″W	40.5	27	2011	
Upstream Wind	Antelope County	42°11′03″N 97°57′54″W	202.5	81	2018	

== Storage power stations ==
There were no utility-scale storage power stations in the state of Nebraska in 2019.

== HVDC converter stations ==
Project name	Location	Coordinates	Capacity (MW)	Voltage (kV)	Year opened	Ref
David A. Hamil Converter Station	Scotts Bluff County	41°49′15″N 103°56′32″W	100	50	1977	
Virginia Smith Converter Station	Cheyenne County	41°09′51″N 102°59′15″W	200	50	1988	

== Utilities ==
- Central Nebraska Public Power & Irrigation District
- Lincoln Electric System
- Nebraska Public Power District
- North Central Public Power District
- Northwest Rural Public Power District
- Omaha Public Power District
- Southern Power District
- Southwest Public Power District
