= Southern Power =

Southern Power may refer to:

- The former name of Duke Power, now Duke Energy
- Southern Power District, a publicly owned electric utility in south-central Nebraska
- Southern Power: a wholesale generation subsidiary of Southern Company
- Slave Power, in the Antebellum United States
- The name Australian rules football club Sutherland AFC are known by
