= Omaha Public Power District =

Public electric utility in Nebraska, US

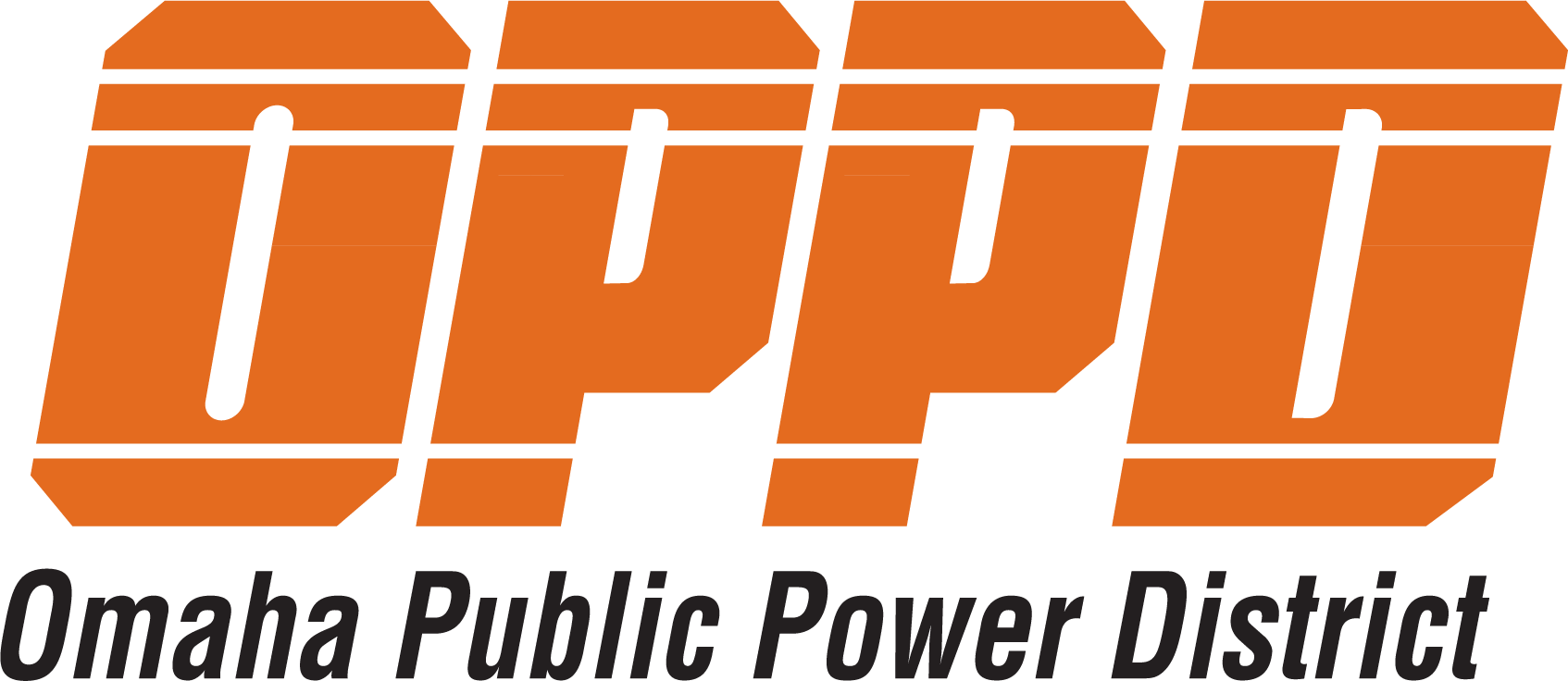
- Company type: Publicly owned
- Predecessor: Nebraska Power Company
- Founded: December 2, 1946; 79 years ago
- Headquarters: Energy Plaza; 444 South 16th Mall, Omaha, Nebraska
- Area served: Eastern Nebraska
- Key people: L. Javier Fernandez (president and CEO); Amanda Bogner (chair of the board of directors)
- Services: Electricity
- Revenue: 1,428,905,000 United States dollar (2023)
- Number of employees: 1,797 (2019)
- Website: www.oppd.com

Omaha Public Power District (OPPD) is a public electric utility in the state of Nebraska. It is wholly owned by the Nebraska state government, and controlled by a special district. OPPD serves more than 855,000 people in Omaha and 13 surrounding counties in southeast eastern Nebraska. OPPD was formed in 1946 as a political subdivision of the State of Nebraska, taking over the operations of the privately owned Nebraska Power Company. Nebraska is the only US state in which all electric utilities are government owned. A publicly elected eight-member Board of Directors sets rates and policies.

== History ==
The Nebraska Unicameral created OPPD as a division of the state government on December 2, 1946. It acquired the Maine-based Nebraska Power Company for $42,000,000 ($677 million in 2024) after a four-year political struggle. Prior to its acquisition, NPC was the only privately owned remaining in the state. In January 1965, the Eastern Nebraska Public Power District was merged into OPPD, adding four counties to its service area. In September 1973, OPPD's Fort Calhoun Nuclear Generating Station entered commercial service. In 1996, OPPD purchased a rail line running from Lincoln to Nebraska City from BNSF Railway. In 2014, OPPD joined the newly created Southwest Power Pool. In December 2019, the board of the Omaha Public Power District voted to commit to net-zero emissions by 2050. A 400- to 600-megawatt solar array is planned, as is the closing of three gas-fired power units, and the conversion of two coal-burning units to natural gas. In 2021, due to a storm, OPPD experienced its largest-ever outage, affecting 188,000 customers.

OPPD was named "Highest in Customer Satisfaction among Midsize Utilities in the Midwest" in the J.D. Power and Associates 2009 Electric Utility Residential Customer Satisfaction Study. In 2012, OPPD was awarded its 12th J.D. Power and Associates award.

== Facilities ==
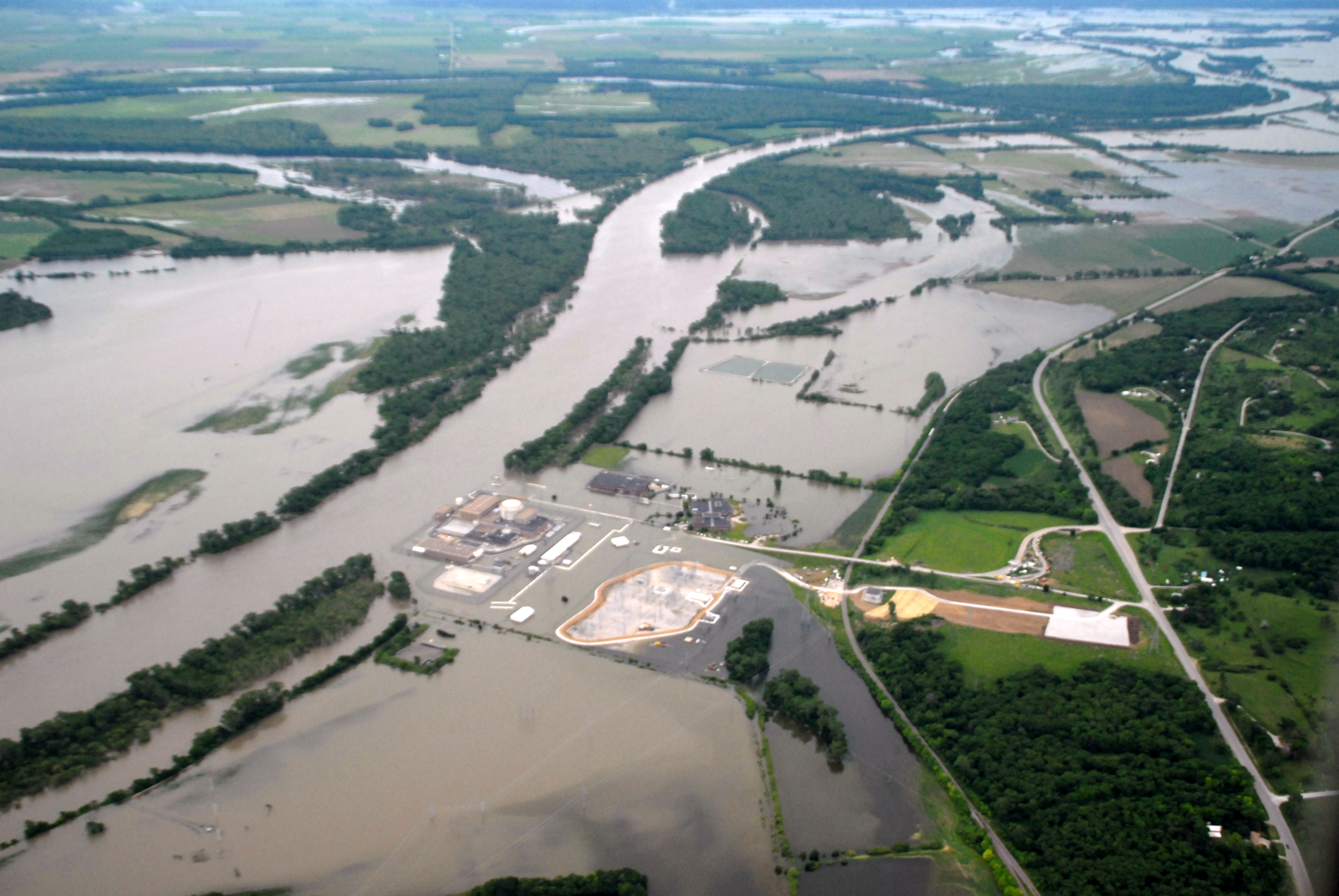
Fort Calhoun on June 16, 2011, during the 2011 Missouri River Floods

OPPD-owned generating facilities
Name	Total units	Began Operating	Location (nearest city)	Fuel	Capacity	Type
Cass County Station	2	2003	40.947913°N 95.96403°W (Murray, NE)	Natural Gas	314 MW	Peaking
Elk City Station	8	2002	41.383993°N 96.254354°W (Bennington, NE)	Landfill gas	5 MW	Baseload
Jones Street Station	2	1973	41.251488°N 95.92268°W (Omaha, NE)	Fuel Oil	115 MW	Peaking
Nebraska City 1	1	1979	40.620486°N 95.774491°W (Nebraska City, NE)	Coal	650 MW	Baseload
Nebraska City 2	1	2009	40.620486°N 95.774491°W (Nebraska City, NE)	Coal	687 MW	Baseload
North Omaha 1–3	3	1954	41.329548°N 95.946311°W (North Omaha, NE)	Natural Gas	240 MW	Peaking
North Omaha 4 & 5	2	1963	41.329548°N 95.946311°W (North Omaha, NE)	Coal	324 MW	Baseload
Sarpy County Station	5	1972	41.170633°N 95.970223°W (Bellevue, NE)	Natural gas	312 MW	Peaking
Standing Bear Lake Station	9	2024	41.315866°N 96.095398°W (Omaha, NE)	Natural gas	162 MW	Peaking
Turtle Creek Station	2	2024	41.096319°N 96.170261°W (Gretna, NE)	Natural gas	550 MW	Peaking

OPPD formerly operated the Fort Calhoun Nuclear Generating Station near Fort Calhoun. After 42 years of operation (interrupted by flooding from 2011 to 2013), the plant was shut down on October 25, 2016, and is in the process of being decommissioned. OPPD operates other generating stations in North Omaha, Nebraska City, Valley, Elkhorn and in Cass County; coal, natural gas, oil, wind turbines, solar, and landfill gas are used to generate electricity at their power plants.

OPPD also purchases 81 megawatts of hydroelectricity capacity from the Western Area Power Administration. OPPD has the exclusive rights to power from two privately-operated solar power stations of 5 and 81 megawatts in Fort Calhoun and Saunders County respectively.

== See also ==
- List of power stations in Nebraska
- Metropolitan Utilities District
