= Derril Marshall Generating Station =

Coordinates: 41.4289°N 96.4515°W

Derril Marshall Generating Station is a 40 MW (megawatt) natural gas/fuel oil heavy-frame General Electric gas turbine owned and operated by the City of Fremont Department of Utilities in Fremont, Nebraska. It was purchased by the city and began commercial operation in late 2003 as a peaking facility to supplement the city's coal-fired facility Lon D. Wright Power Plant.

== Renamed ==
In September 2015, the Fremont mayor, Scott Getzchman announced that the gas fired peaking unit would be renamed Derril Marshall Generating Station.
