= Spalding Power Plant and Dam =

- U.S. National Register of Historic Places
- U.S. Historic district
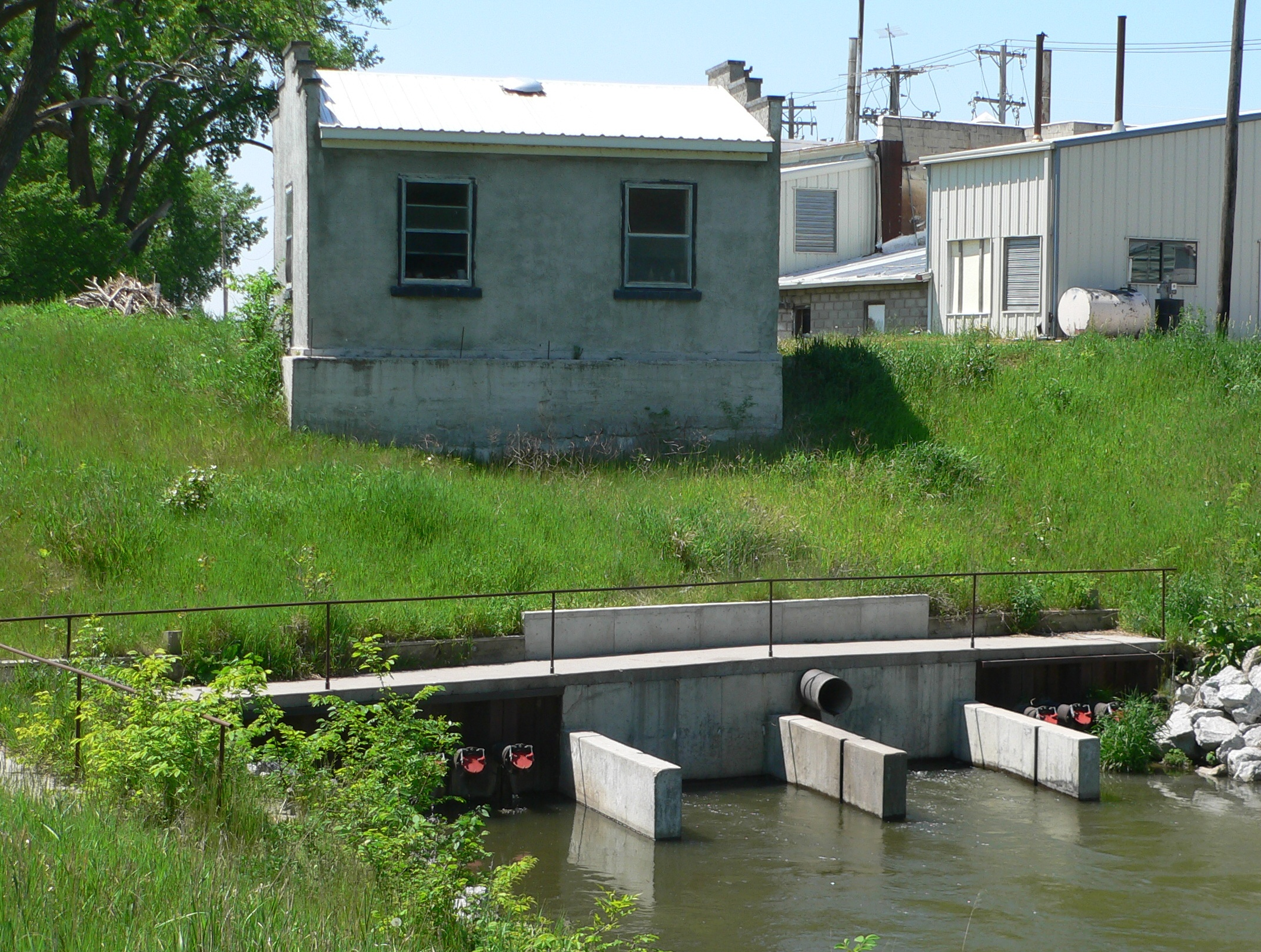
- Wheel house from the east

- Location within Nebraska Location within the United States
- Location: 10 County Rd., Spalding, Nebraska
- Coordinates: 41°40′54″N 98°21′37″W
- Area: 58 acres (23 ha)
- Built: 1919
- NRHP reference No.: 98001569
- Added to NRHP: December 31, 1998

The Spalding Power Plant and Dam, at 10 County Rd. in Spalding in Greeley County, Nebraska, was built in 1919. It was listed on the National Register of Historic Places in 1998.

The 58 acres (23 ha) site listed included two contributing buildings, a contributing structure, and two contributing sites.

The buildings are one housing electrical generating engines and the wheel house which contains water powered turbines. The structure is the combination of the dam, its water race, and headgates. The sites are a golf course and a lake.

== Gallery ==
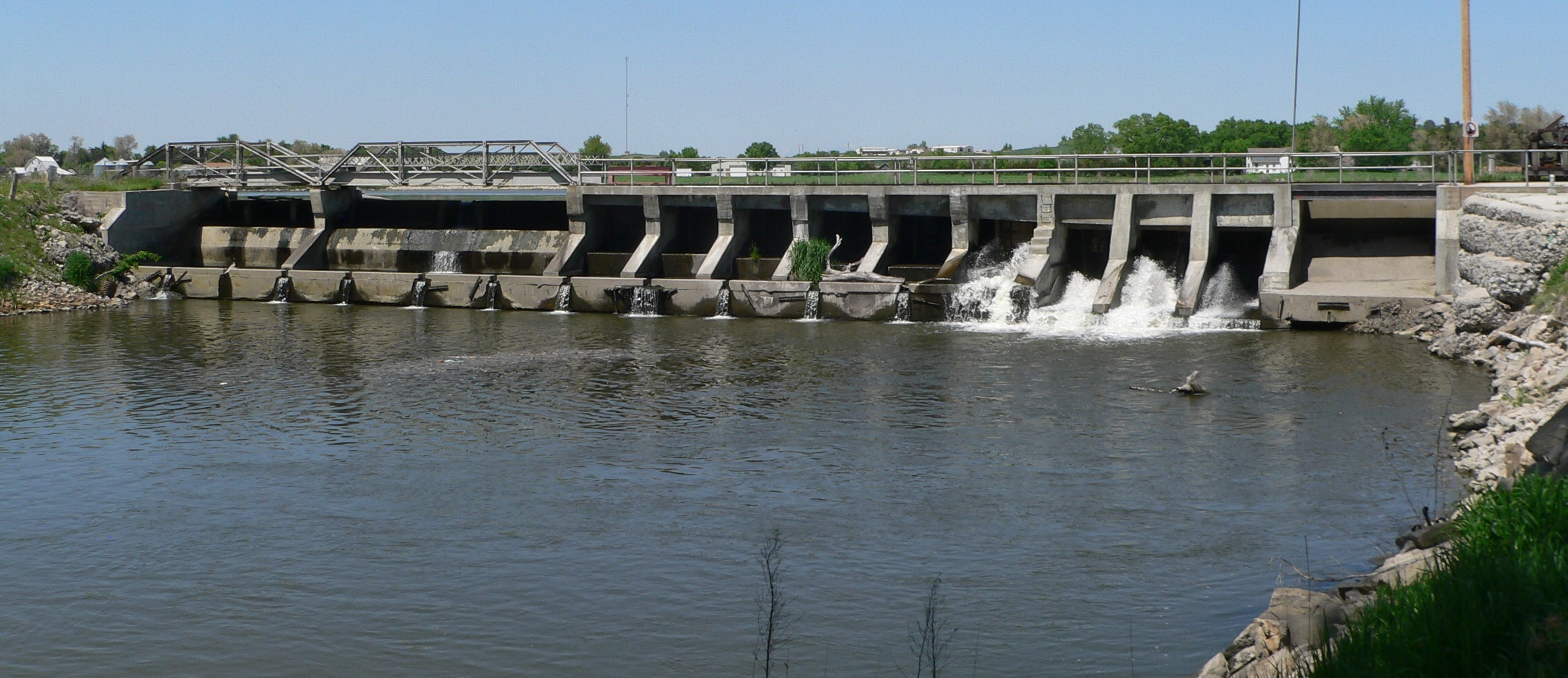
Diversion dam on the Cedar River; from the south (downstream)

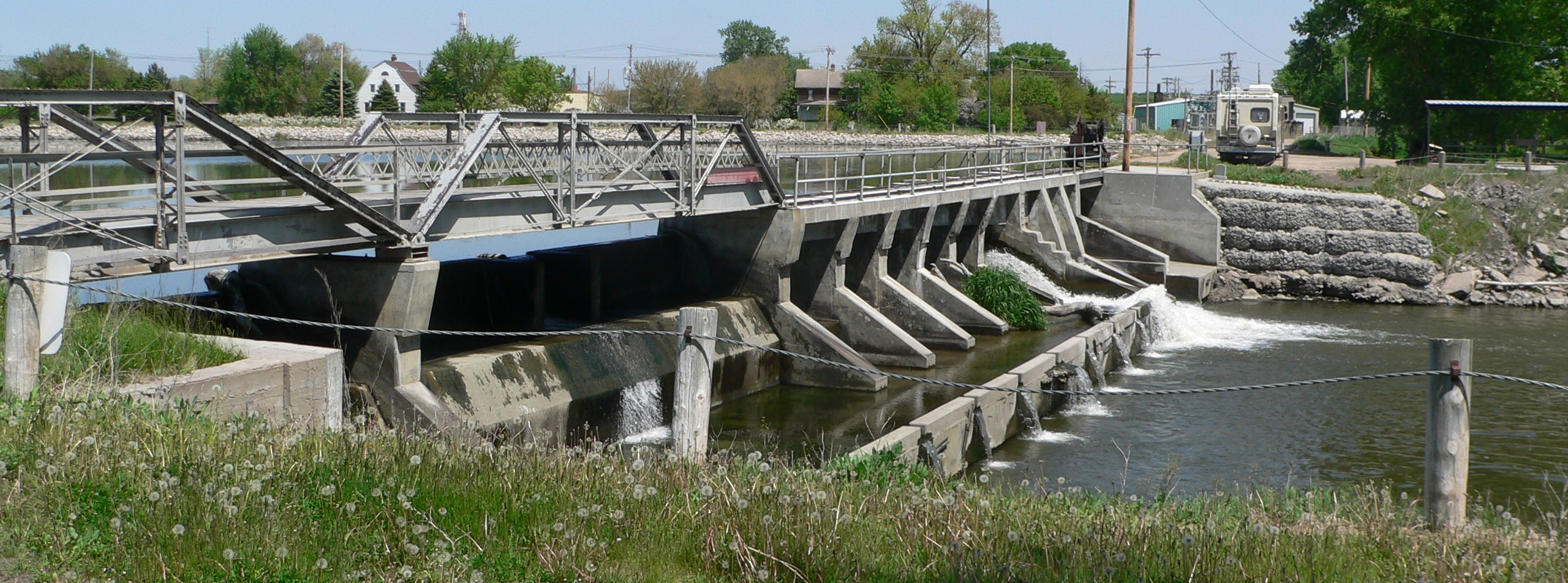
Diversion dam on the Cedar River; from the west

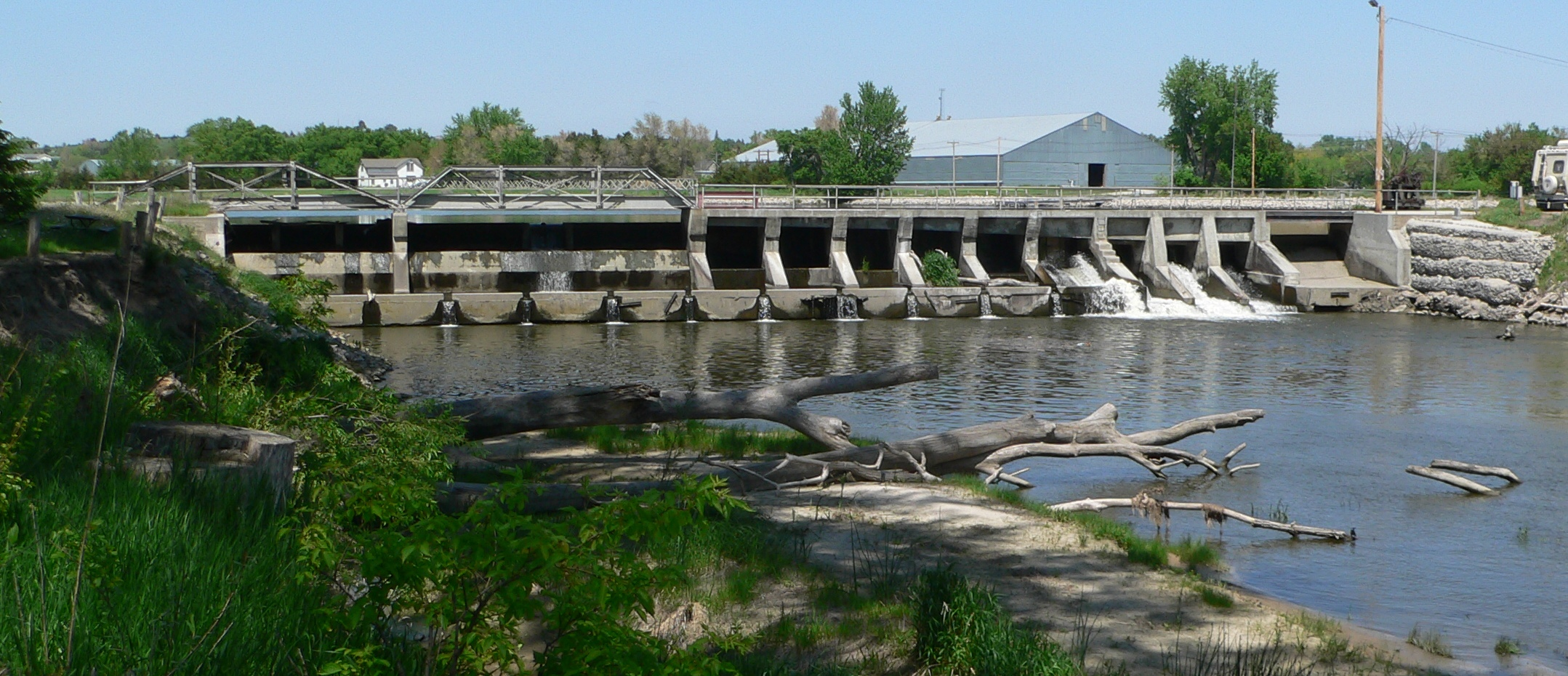
Diversion dam on the Cedar River; from the southwest (downstream)

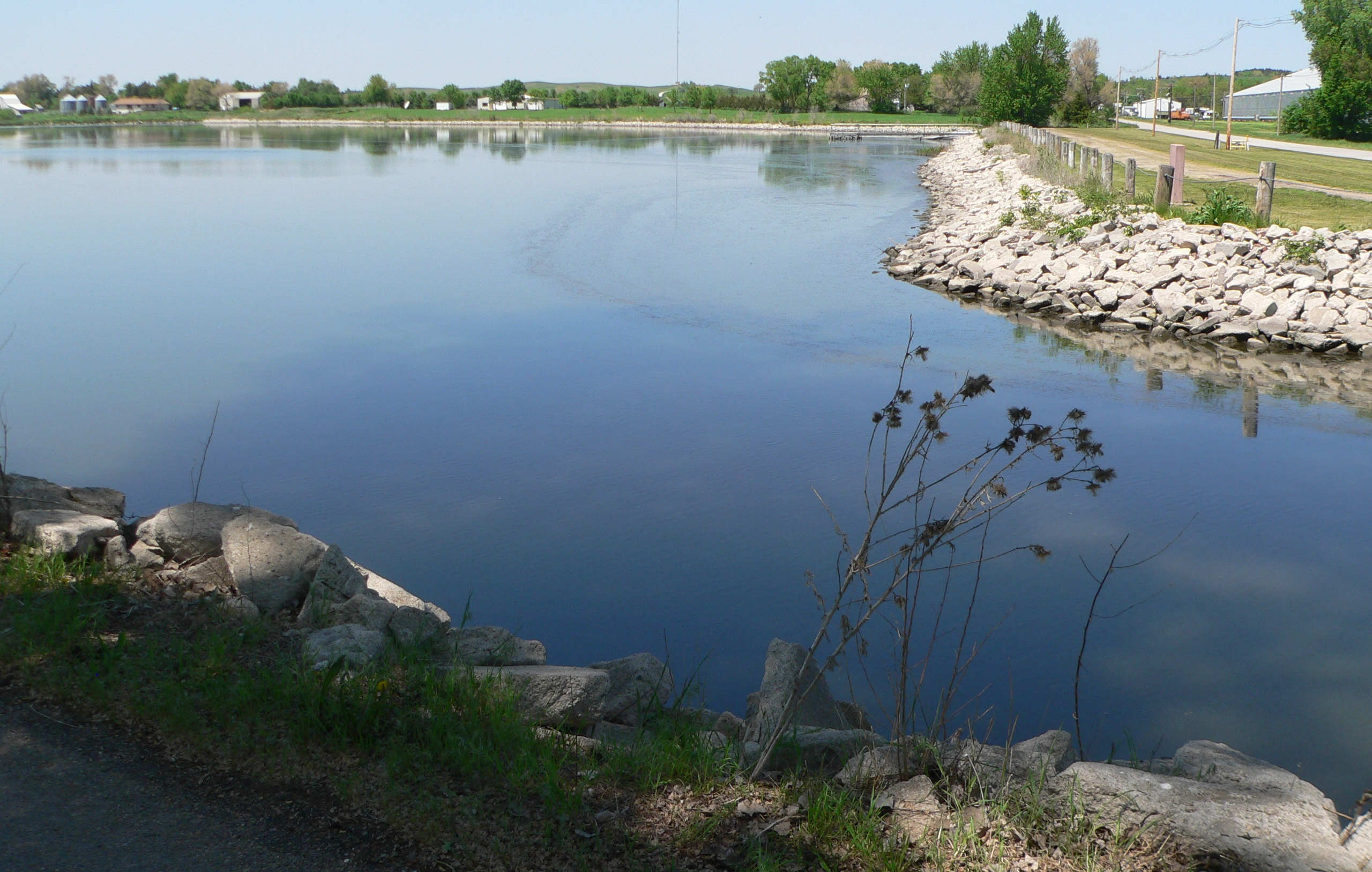
reservoir from downstream

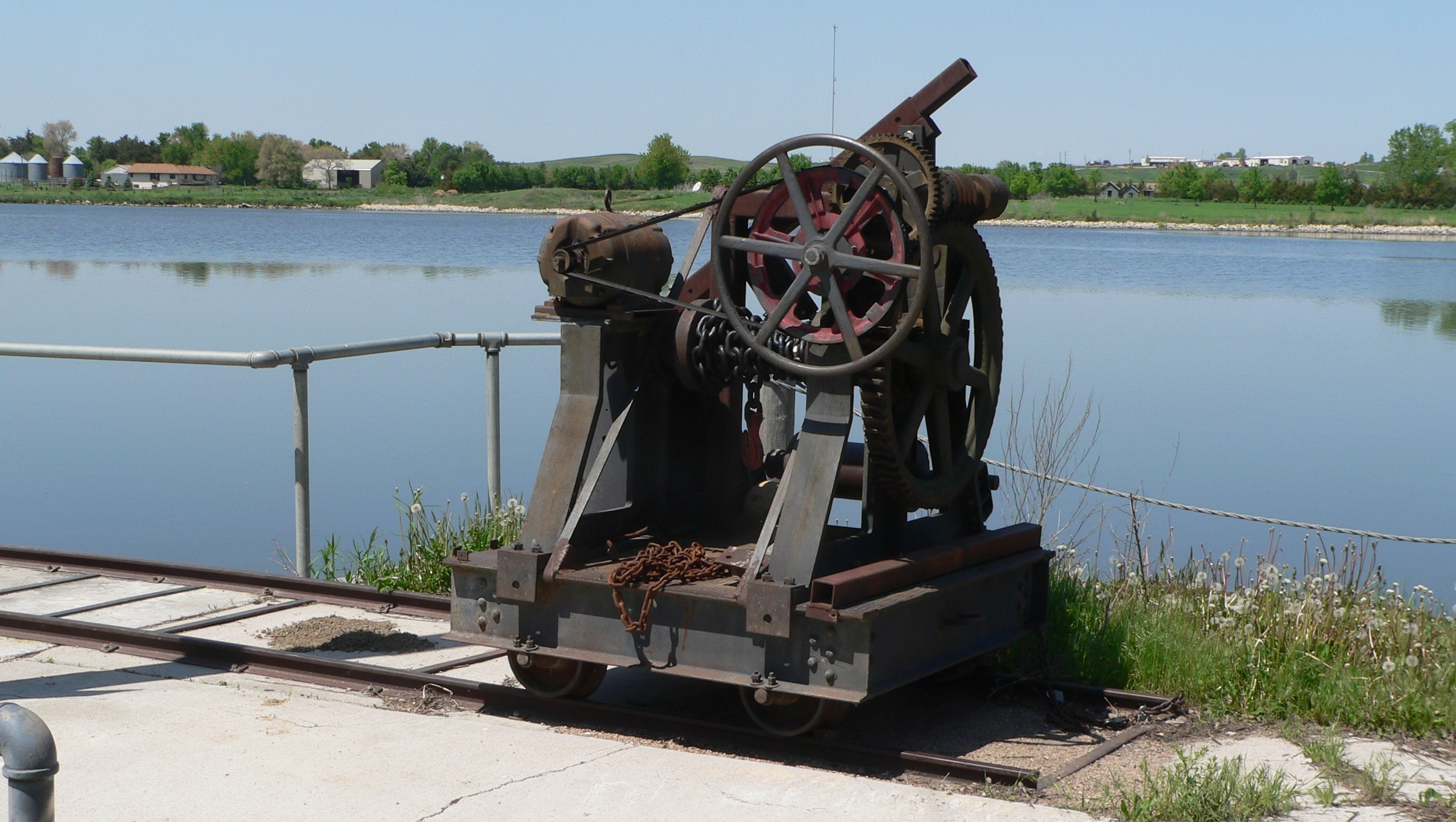
Rail-mounted winch atop diversion dam

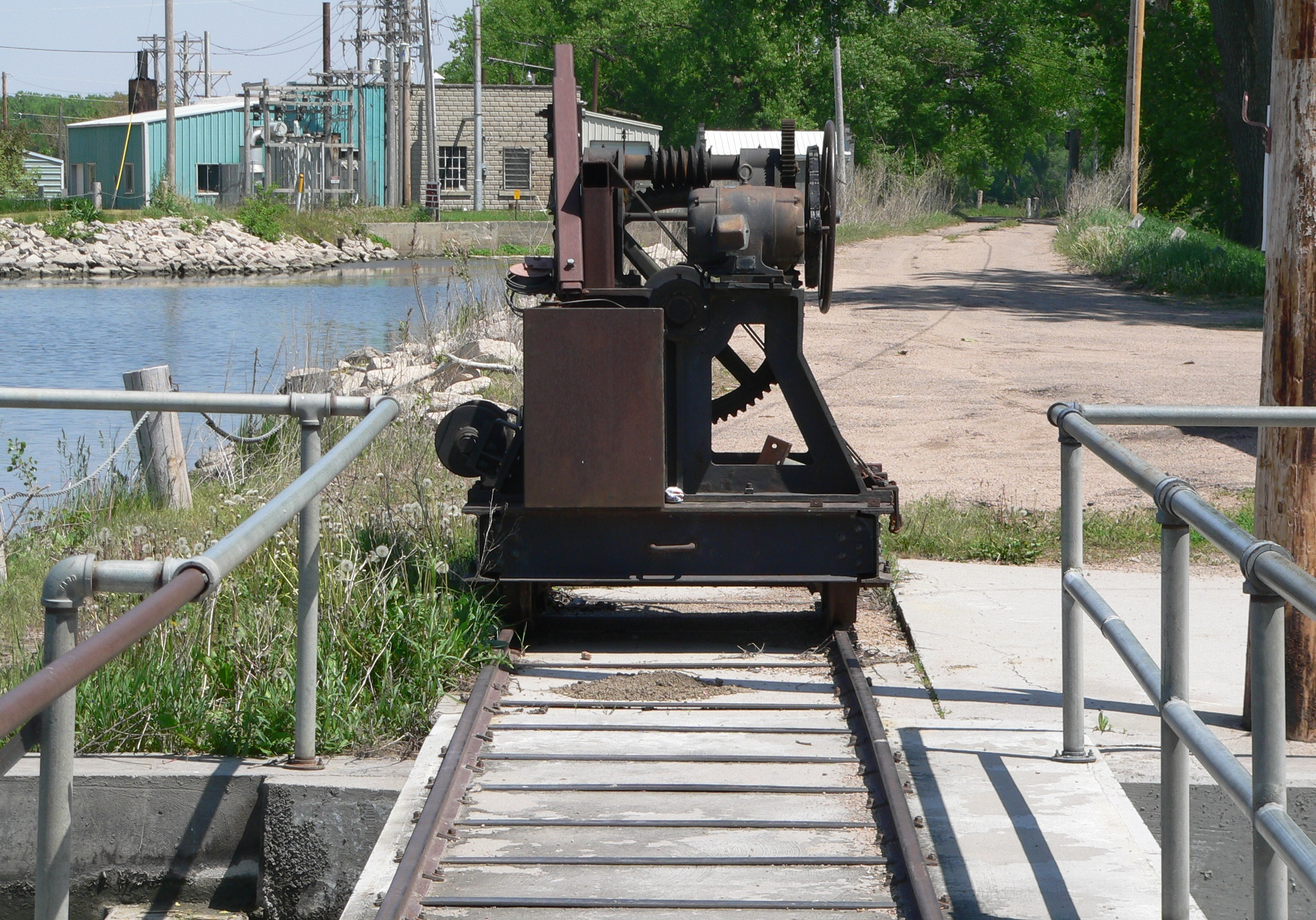
Rail-mounted winch atop diversion dam

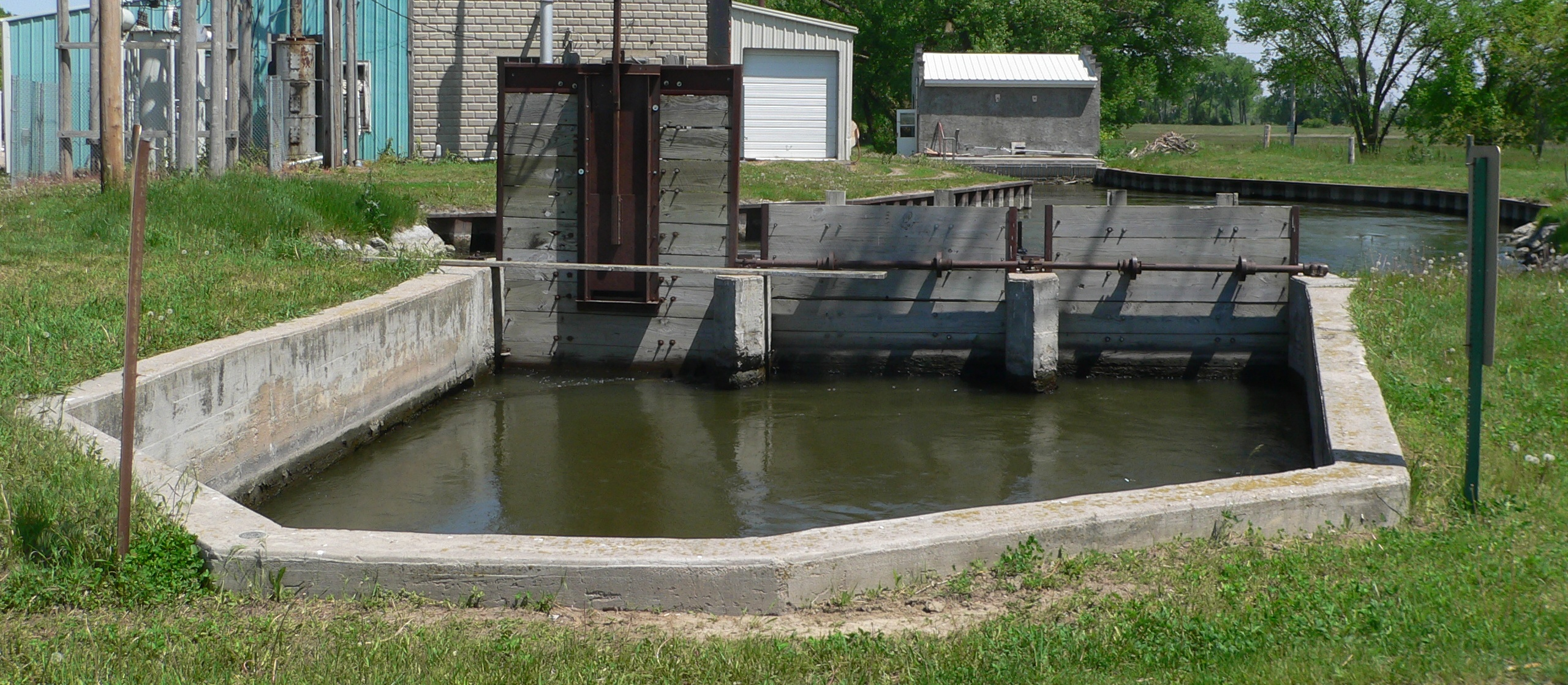
Sluice gates from upstream

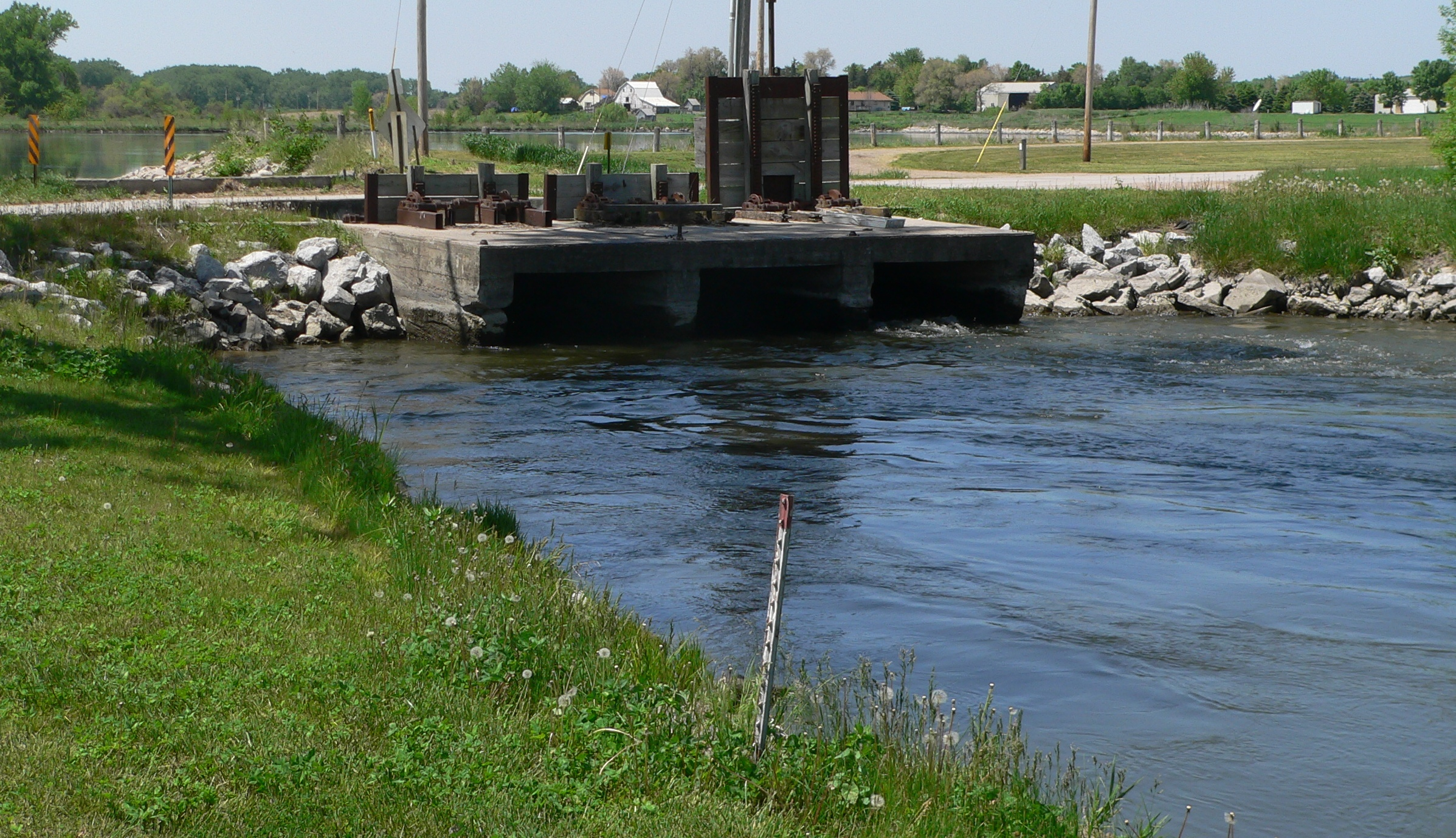
Sluice gates from downstream

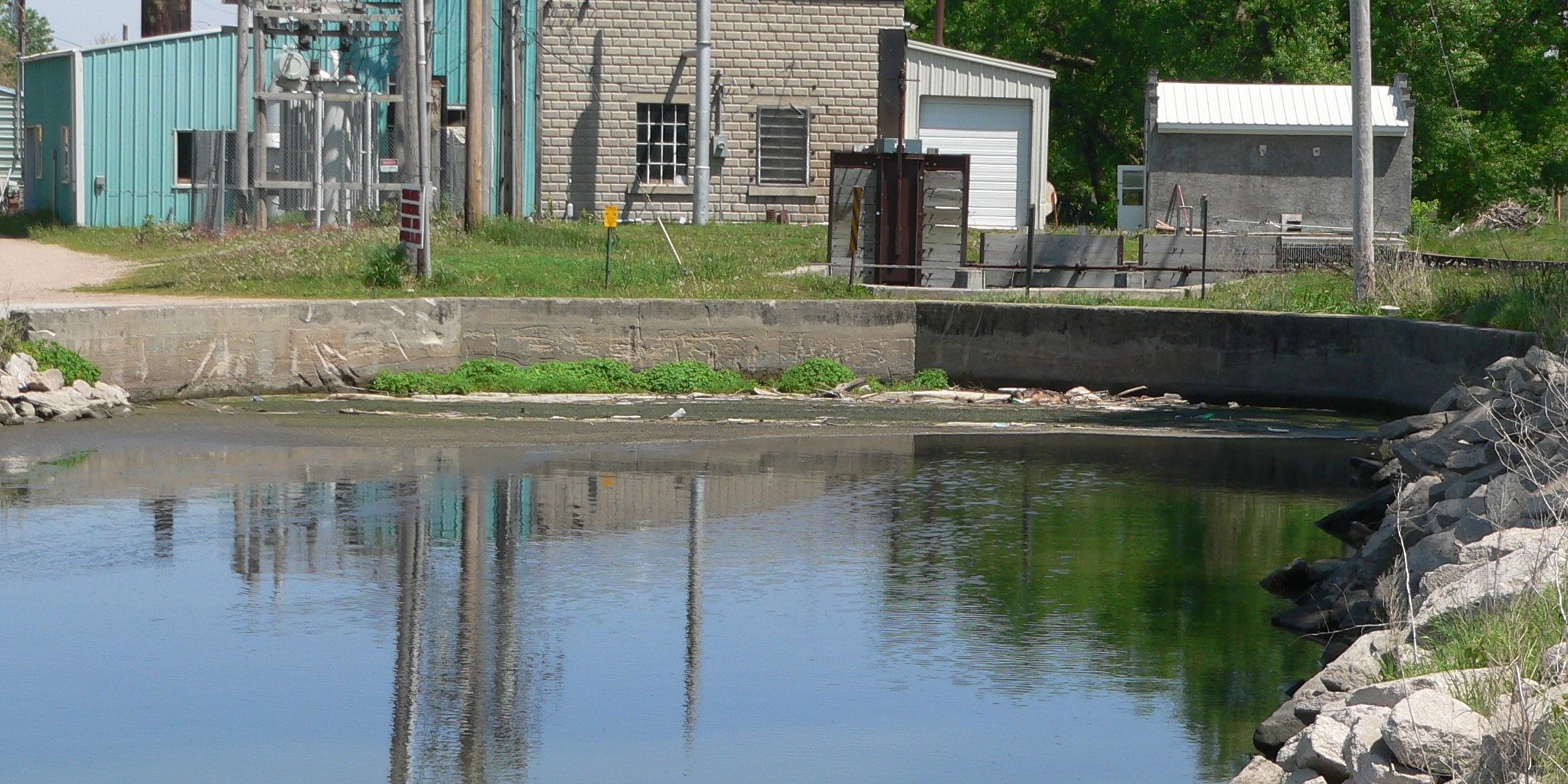
Wheel house from upstream

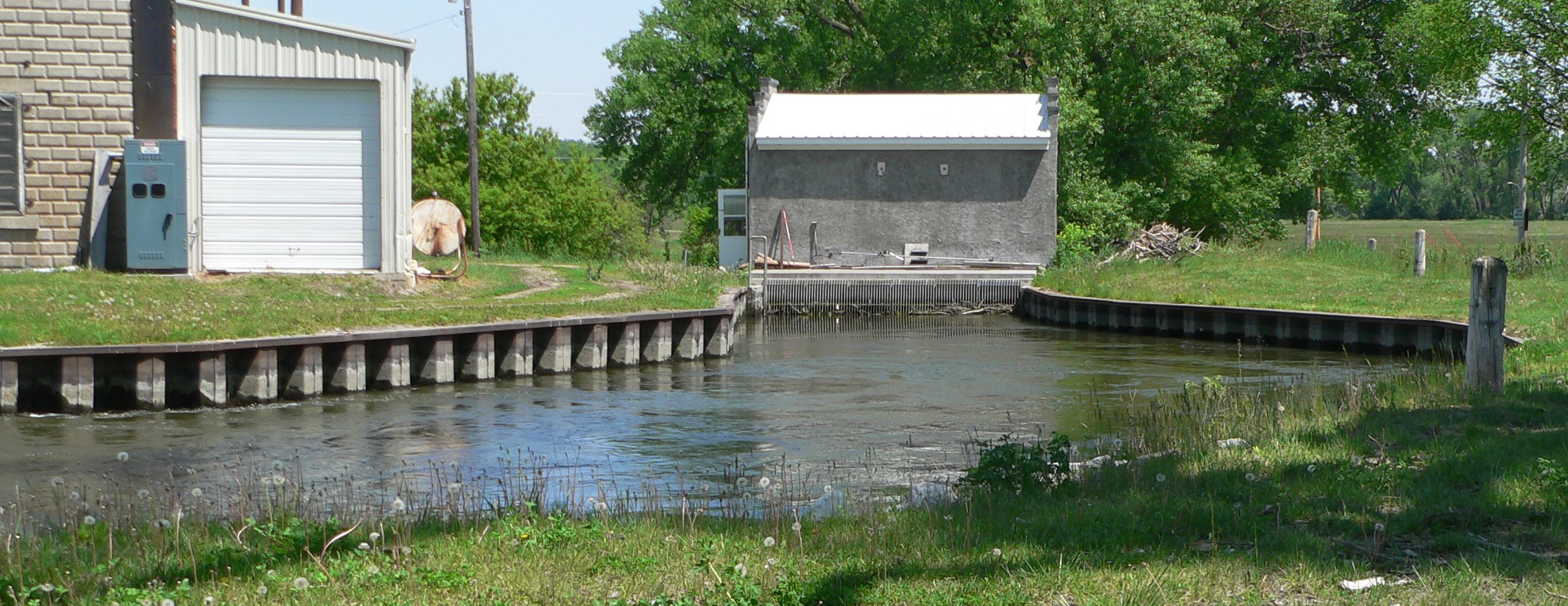
Wheel house from west

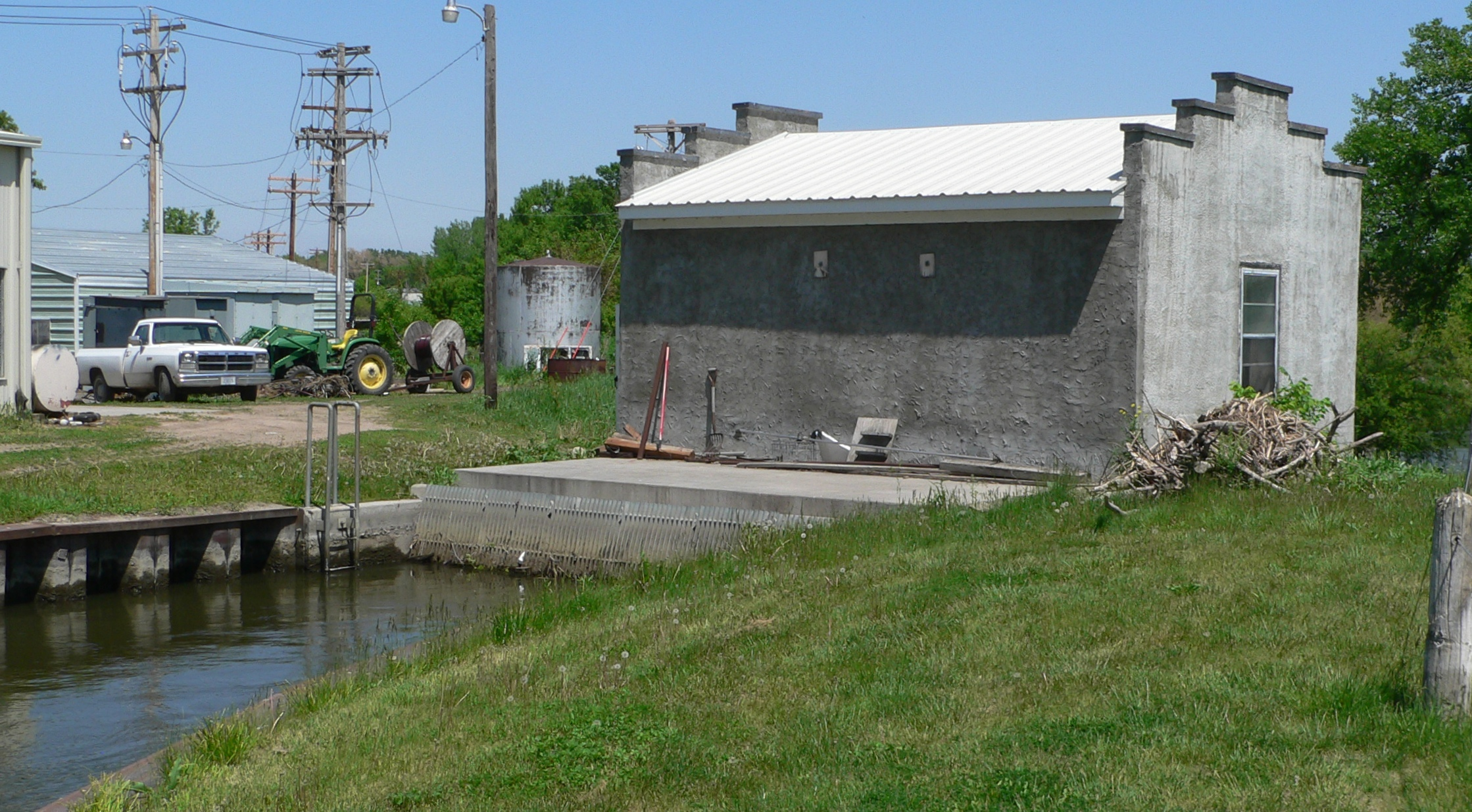
Wheel house from southwest

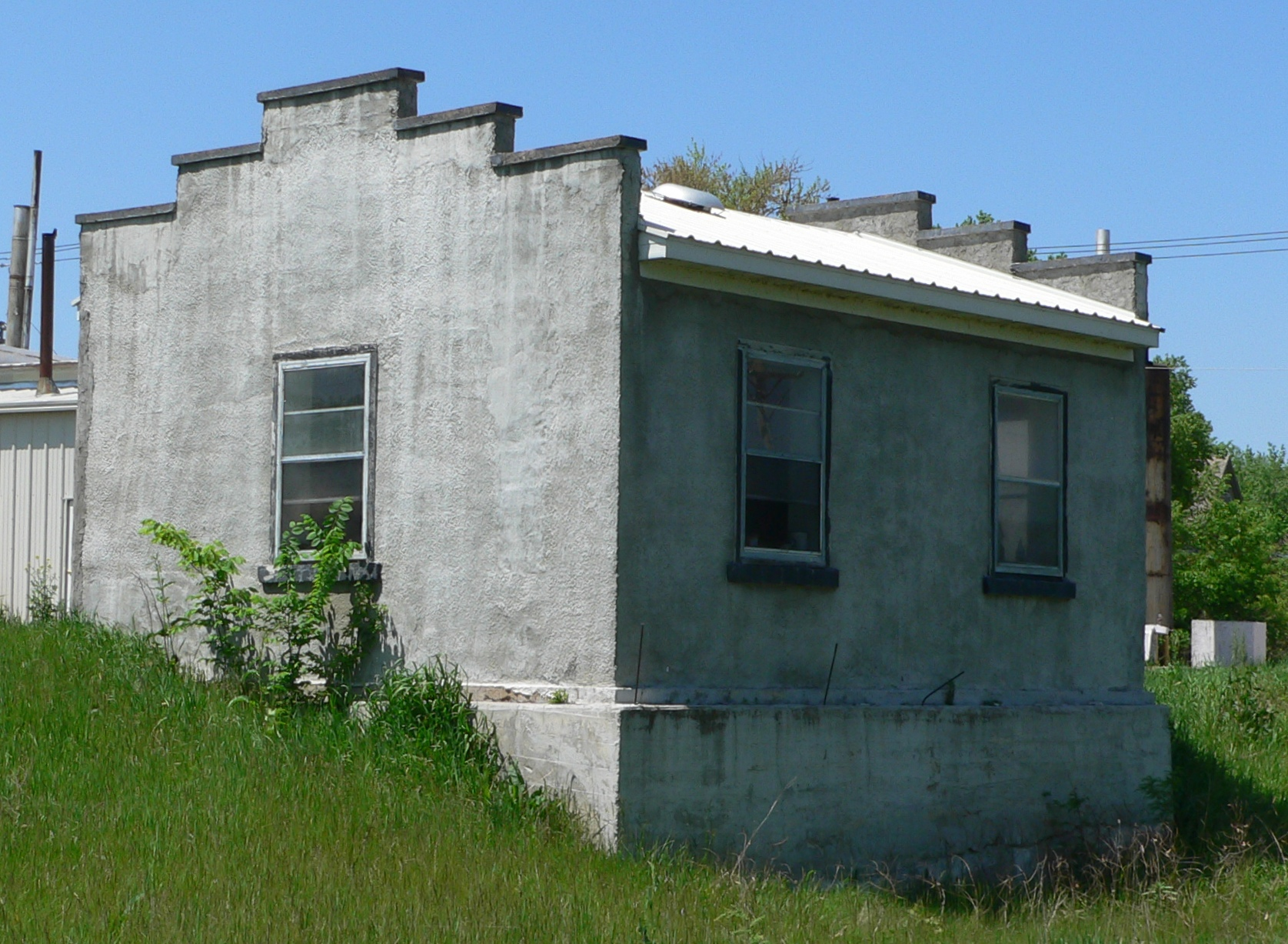
Wheel house from southeast

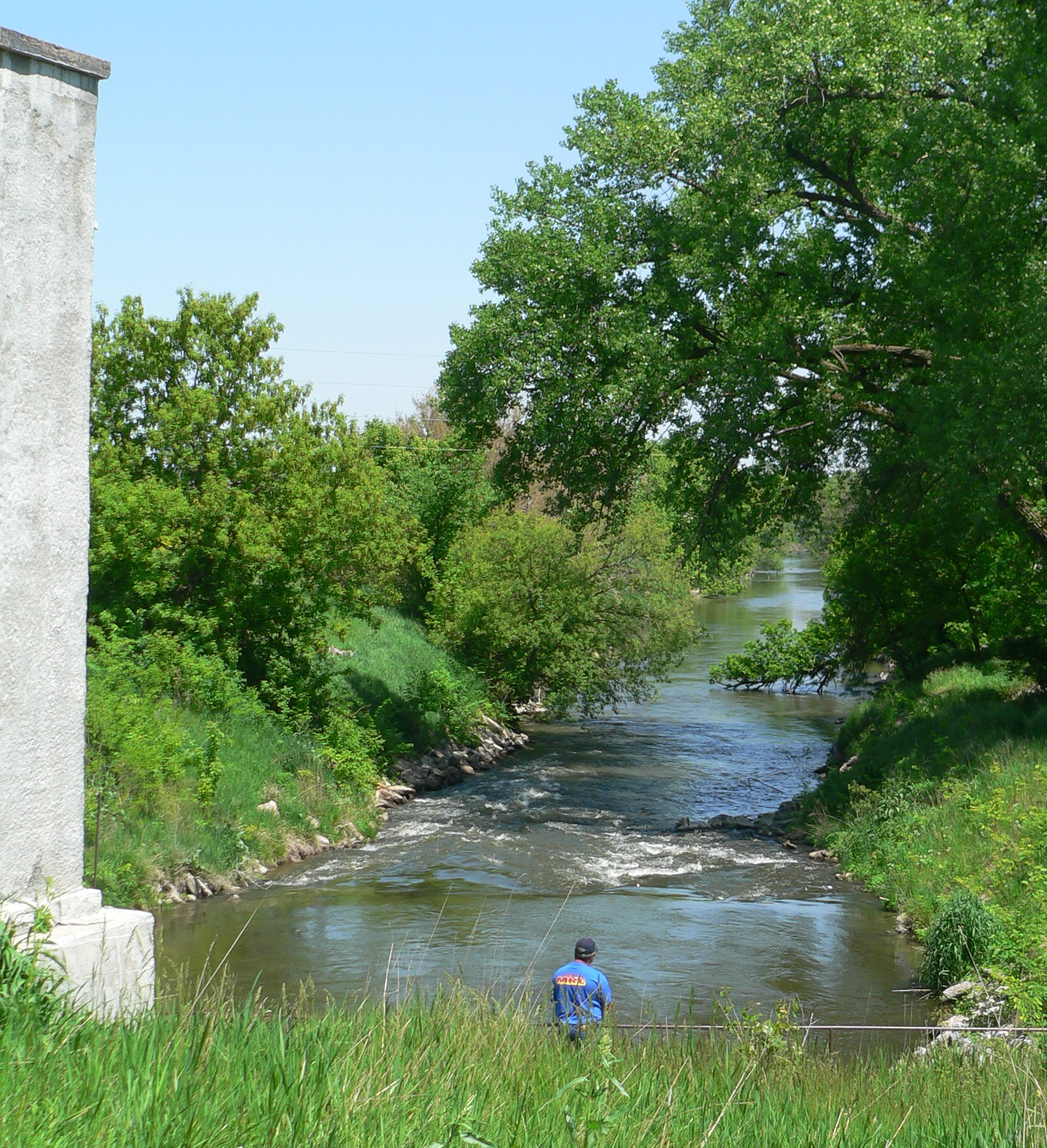
Tailrace from upstream
