= Gerald Gentleman Station =

Nebraska's largest electricity generating plant

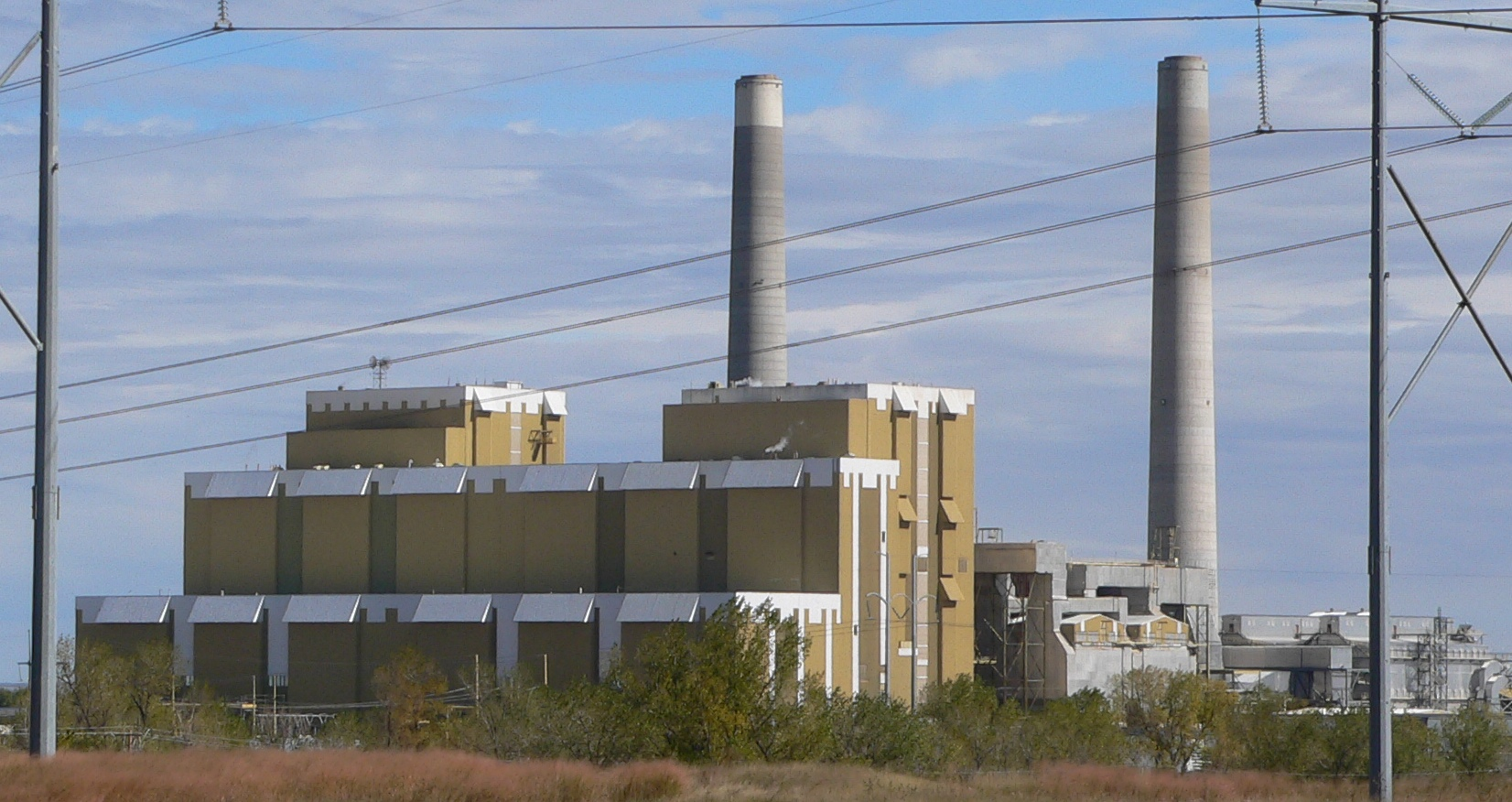
Gerald Gentleman Station, seen from the southwest

Gerald Gentleman Station is the largest electricity generating plant in Nebraska, USA. It is located at 41°04′51″N 101°08′35″W, approximately 7 miles (11 km) south of Sutherland. The plant, owned and operated by Nebraska Public Power District (NPPD), consists of two coal-fired generating units launched into service in 1979 and 1982, which together have the capability to generate 1,365 megawatts of power.

== History ==
The construction of the station began in May 1973 and the first unit entered commercial service in April 1979 at a cost of $335 million. The construction of the second unit began in June 1977 and it began its commercial service in January 1982 with an additional expenditure of $287 million. The facility is named after Gerald Gentleman, a Platte Center, Nebraska, native.

== Coal supply ==
Coal comes from Powder River Basin in Wyoming by railroad, using Union Pacific and BNSF Railway lines as well as tracks that were built for this purpose by NPPD. At full capacity, the station burns 840 tons (762,000 kg) of coal per hour.

== Water use ==
The waste heat is dumped into man-made Sutherland Reservoir, fed by the Sutherland Canal which originates at Kingsley Dam on the North Platte River.
