= Beatrice Power Station =

Power station in United States

- Country: United States
- Location: Blakely Township, Gage County; near Beatrice, Nebraska
- Coordinates: 40°19′47″N 96°48′29″W
- Status: Operational
- Construction began: June 26, 2003
- Commission date: January 7, 2005
- Construction cost: US$190 million
- Owner: NPPD

Thermal power station
- Primary fuel: Natural gas
- Combined cycle?: Yes

Power generation
- Units operational: 2 X 80 MW; 1 X 90 MW
- Make and model: Alstom; Siemens
- Nameplate capacity: 250 MW

Beatrice Power Station is a natural gas-fired combined cycle power station in Gage County, Nebraska, United States. It has installed capacity of 250 MW, including two combustion turbines with capacity of 80 MW each and one steam turbine with capacity of 90 MW, provided by Alstom. The project was approved in April 2002, construction of the power station started on June 26, 2003, and it was commissioned on January 7, 2005.
