= Nebraska Public Power District =

Electric utility in Nebraska, United States

- Type: Public corporation
- Industry: Power generation
- Founded: January 1, 1970; 56 years ago
- Founder: Guy L. Myers
- Headquarters: Columbus, United States
- Products: Electricity generation
- Owner: State of Nebraska
- Website: nppd.com

Nebraska Public Power District (NPPD) is the largest electric utility in the state of Nebraska, serving all or parts of 84 of Nebraska’s 93 counties. It was formed on January 1, 1970, when Consumers Public Power District, Platte Valley Public Power and Irrigation District (PVPPID) and Nebraska Public Power System merged to become Nebraska Public Power District. NPPD's predecessors were created through the efforts of the Nebraska legislature and financial agent Guy L. Myers as part of a system where all the investor-owned utilities operating in the state of Nebraska (Nebraska Power Company, Central Power Company, Southern Nebraska Power Company, and others) were condemned and their properties turned over to 'public power districts' being created at the time (early 1940s).

The NPPD is a public corporation and political subdivision of the state of Nebraska. The utility is governed by an 11-member Board of Directors, who are popularly elected from NPPD's chartered territory. It is a member of the Midwest Reliability Organization.

NPPD's revenue is mainly derived from wholesale power supply agreements with 52 cities/villages and 25 rural public power districts and rural cooperatives. NPPD also serves about 79 communities directly at the retail level. Over 5,200 miles (8,400 km) of transmission lines make up the NPPD electrical grid system, which delivers power to over 600,000 customers.

NPPD's corporate headquarters is located in Columbus, Nebraska.

== Generating facilities ==
=== Nuclear ===
Cooper Nuclear Station — Brownville

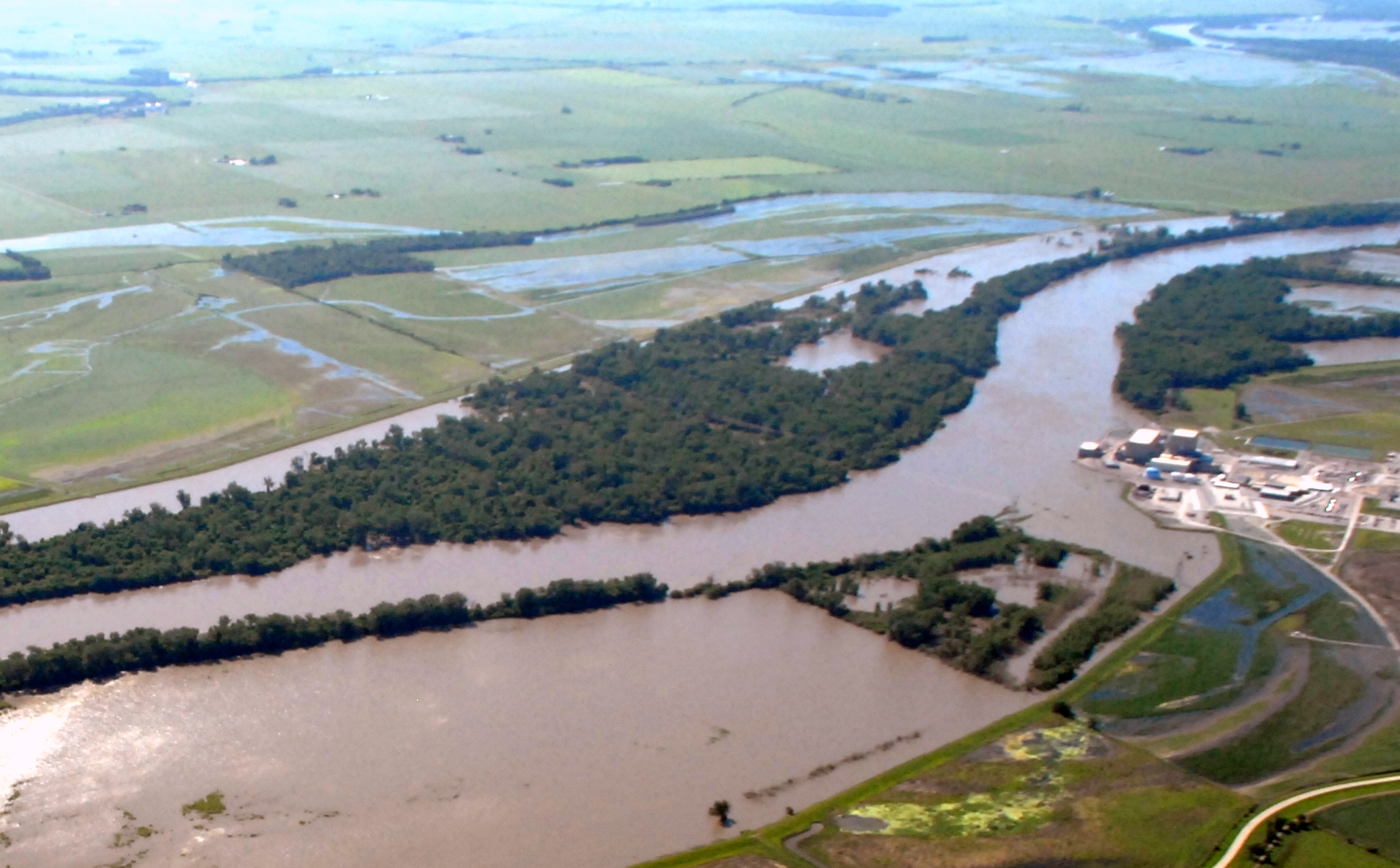
Cooper on June 15, 2011, during the 2011 Missouri River Floods

=== Coal ===
Gerald Gentleman Station — Sutherland

Sheldon Power Station — Hallam

=== Natural gas ===
Canaday Station — Lexington

=== Combined-cycle ===
Beatrice Power Station — Beatrice

In addition, NPPD operates two wind generation facilities, nine hydroelectric facilities, nine diesel plants and three peaking units.

NPPD also purchases electricity from the Western Area Power Administration, which is operated by the United States Department of Energy.

== Irrigation and recreation ==
NPPD also operates the intricate network of irrigation canals, dams and reservoirs along a 150-mile (240 km) stretch of the Platte River which help power its hydro plants. In addition to the essential role the water plays in irrigating farmland and generating electricity in the area, the reservoir system provides fishing, hunting and boating opportunities for all Nebraskans.

=== Lake Maloney ===
Lake Maloney is located along Highway 83, five miles (8.0 km) south of the Interstate 80 exit at North Platte, Nebraska. Lake Maloney is used to regulate the flow of water for generating electricity at NPPD's nearby North Platte Hydro facility. The 1,650-acre (6.7 km^{2}) reservoir is a popular place for fishing, skiing and boating. A handicap-accessible fishing pier, fish-cleaning station and 57 camping pads with electrical hookups are available at the lake's Inlet Recreation Area.

Lake Maloney's Outlet Recreation Area has camp sites, a trailer dump station, two boat ramp/docks, a fish-cleaning station and a shower house. Primitive camp sites are also available at several locations around the lake, and an 18-hole golf course is nearby. Entry to the lake requires a day or season pass from the Nebraska Game and Parks Commission. Camping fees are posted.

=== Lake Ogallala, Sutherland Supply Canal ===
Lake Ogallala and the Sutherland Supply Canal are among the top trout fisheries in the state. The area is also one of the best places in the nation for viewing a wide variety of native and migratory birds, including bald eagles.

The lake is formed by the Keystone Dam on the North Platte River. Canal roads can be accessed east from Highway 61 or north from U.S. 30 at Roscoe and Paxton. Because of steep banks and swift water, no wading, boating or watercraft are permitted in the canal. Anglers fishing from the banks are recommended to wear life jackets. Emergency buoys with ropes are location along the canal. This is a day-use area; no overnight camping is allowed.

=== Sutherland Reservoir ===
The Sutherland Reservoir is a 3,000-acre (12 km^{2}) lake located three miles (4.8 km) south of the Interstate 80 Exit at Sutherland, Nebraska. NPPD owns and manages the Sutherland Reservoir, part of its hydropower system. Nebraska Game and Parks Commission (NGPC) oversees most of the recreation areas at the lake. A day or season pass is required for entry into NGPC areas.

Primitive campsites are located on the east and west sides of the lake, while a private camping area with electrical hook-ups and a nine-hole golf course are located along the north shore. Four boat launching ramps and two swimming areas are available. NPPD maintains a roost and perch tree protection program for eagles and, during the winter months, bird watchers can observe numerous wintering American Bald Eagles.

=== North Platte Trail ===
In North Platte, the city's riding and hiking path continues on the south side of town along NPPD's North Platte Hydro tailrace canal. Trail users travel under Interstate 80 on a low-water bridge along the canal. Hikers and bikers pass along the grass and gravel canal maintenance road to State Farm Road where the route continues west. From the bridge, trail users receive a fine view of the North Platte Hydro. Fishing is allowed north of the bridge, but not immediately downstream of the North Platte Hydro. Boaters and swimmers are restricted from the tailrace canal.

=== Kearney Canal Trail ===
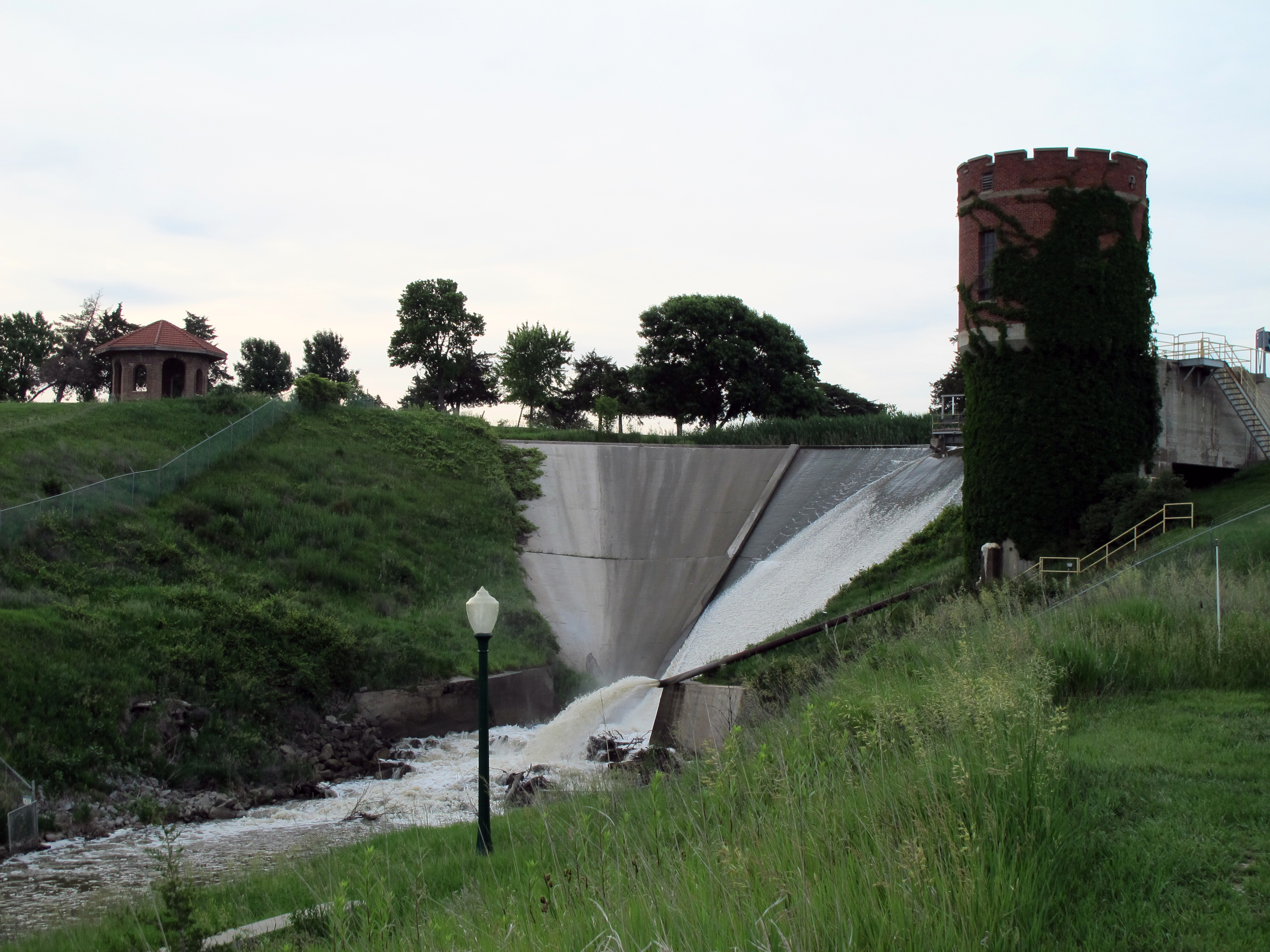
Kearney Dam, Kearney, Nebraska, USA

The City of Kearney and Buffalo County Parks and Recreation Department constructed an 8-foot (2.4 m)-wide concrete trail along NPPD's Kearney Canal in 1996. The 2.6-mile (4.2 km) scenic corridor is a gradual downhill grade from Cottonmill Park to the University of Nebraska at Kearney campus. The 16-mile (26 km)-long canal was built in the 1880s to divert Platte River water for irrigation and electrical generation. Cottonmill Lake once served as a reservoir for a cotton mill and now is a city park. The Kearney Dam & Hydro date to 1889. The 1.485-megawatt hydro-generator in the turret-looking tower was refurbished by NPPD in 1996. Access to NPPD's dam and hydro areas near the trail is restricted with no swimming or boating allowed.

== Districts served by NPPD ==
- Burt County PPD
- Butler PPD
- Cedar-Knox PPD
- Cuming County PPD
- Custer PPD
- Dawson PPD
- Elkhorn RPPD
- Howard-Greeley RPPD
- KBR RPPD
- Loup PD
- Loup Valleys RPPD
- McCook PPD
- Niobrara Valley EMC
- Norris PPD
- North Central PPD
- Northeast NE PPD
- Perennial PPD
- Polk County PPD
- Seward County PPD
- South Central PPD
- Southern PD
- Southwest PPD
- Stanton County PPD
- Twin Valleys PPD

== Wholesale communities served by NPPD ==
- Arapahoe
- Auburn
- Battle Creek
- Beatrice
- Bradshaw
- Brainard
- Central City
- Chester
- Cozad
- Davenport
- David City
- Deshler
- DeWitt
- Dorchester
- Edgar
- Fairmont
- Friend
- Giltner
- Gothenburg
- Hampton
- Hebron
- Hemingford
- Hildreth
- Holdrege
- Lexington
- Lodgepole
- Lyons
- Madison
- Minden
- Neligh
- Nelson
- North Platte
- Ord
- Polk
- Prague
- Randolph
- Scribner
- Seward
- Snyder
- South Sioux City
- Summerfield, KS
- Superior
- Sutton
- Valentine
- Wahoo
- Wakefield
- Walthill
- Wauneta
- Wayne
- Webber, KS
- Wilcox
- Wymore

== Retail communities served by NPPD ==
- Ainsworth
- Alma
- Anoka
- Ashton
- Atkinson
- Aurora
- Barada
- Bassett
- Big Springs
- Bloomfield
- Brandon
- Bristow
- Broadwater
- Brule
- Burchard
- Butte
- Chadron
- Clinton
- Crab Orchard
- Craig
- Crawford
- Creighton
- Crystal Lake
- Dakota City
- Dawson
- DuBois
- Elm Creek
- Elsie
- Emmet
- Fort Robinson
- Geneva
- Gibbon
- Gordon
- Hartington
- Hay Springs
- Homer
- Humboldt
- Inman
- Kearney
- Lewellen
- Lewiston
- Lisco
- Long Pine
- Loup City
- Lynch
- Madrid
- McCook
- McGrew
- Meadow Grove
- Melbeta
- Merriman
- Milford
- Minatare
- Murray
- Mynard
- Nehawka
- Norfolk
- Northport
- Oakdale
- Oakland
- Odessa
- Ogallala
- Oglala Sioux
- O'Neill
- Oshkosh
- Pawnee City
- Pine Ridge
- Plattsmouth
- Ravenna
- Rushville
- St. Mary
- Scottsbluff
- Shelton
- Shubert
- Steinauer
- Stella
- Sterling
- Sutherland
- Table Rock
- Tekamah
- Terrytown
- Tilden
- Union
- Venango
- Verdon
- White Clay
- Whitney
- Winnebago
- York
