= Canaday Station =

Natural gas-fired power station in Nebraska, US

Coordinates: 40.6942°N 99.7011°W

Canaday Power Station is a 119 (MW) natural gas power plant owned and operated by Nebraska Public Power District, located near Lexington, Nebraska. It was constructed in 1958 by Central Nebraska Public Power and Irrigation. It was acquired by NPPD in 1995, who "mothballed" the power plant (i.e. removed it from use, but maintained it so that it could be used as needed).
