= Lincoln Electric System =

Public electric utility in Nebraska, US

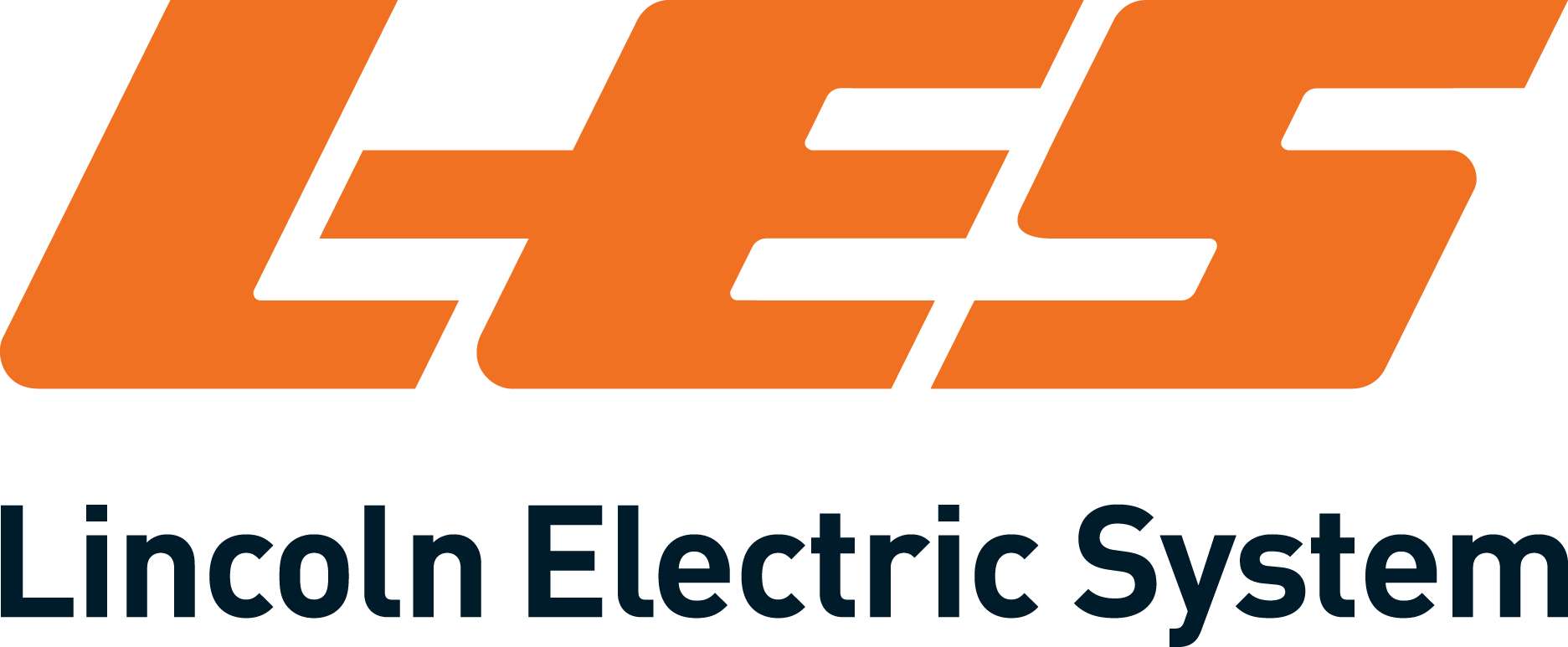
- Company type: Publicly owned
- Founded: February 1, 1966; 60 years ago
- Headquarters: 9445 Rokeby Road, Lincoln, NE
- Key people: Emeka Anyanwu (CEO)
- Services: Electricity
- Number of employees: 1,797 (2019)
- Website: www.les.com

The Lincoln Electric System is a publicly owned electric distribution system providing electricity and related services to customers in Lincoln, Nebraska and the surrounding area. Its nameplate capacity is split approximately equally into coal, natural gas, and renewables. Nebraska is the only state that does not have any privately owned electric utilities. LES is led by a nine-person board of directors, appointed by the mayor of Lincoln. The current CEO is Emeka Anyanwu.
