= Platte Generating Station =

Power station in Nebraska, United States

Coordinates: 40°51′17″N 98°20′53″W

Platte Generating Station is a single unit 100 MW (megawatt) (110 MW nameplate) coal-fired power plant owned and operated by the City of Grand Island located in Grand Island, Nebraska. The plant entered commercial service in 1982.

It serves the city of Grand Island as their primary source of electricity. The city also maintains one other plant, C.W. Burdick Power Plant.
