= Fort Calhoun Nuclear Generating Station =

Shut-down nuclear power plant in Nebraska, USA

Fort Calhoun Nuclear Power Plant
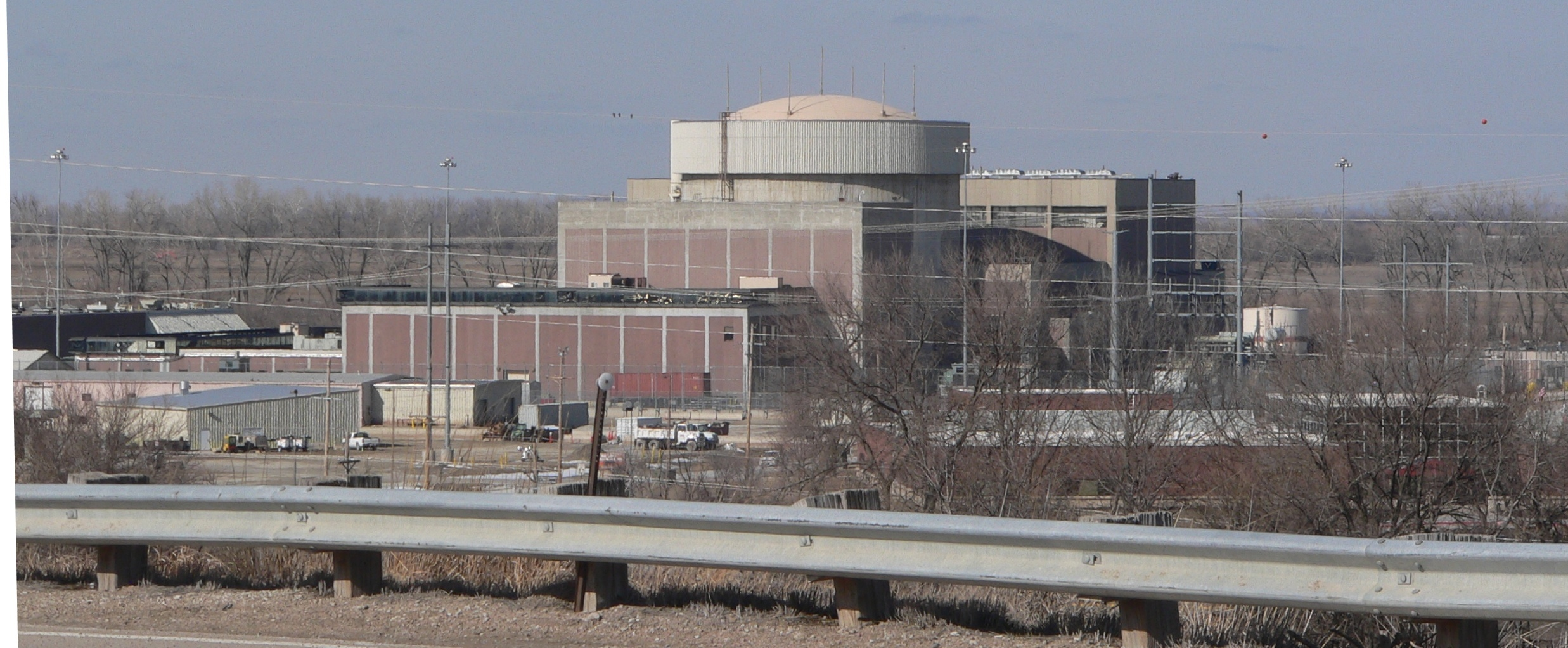
- Fort Calhoun plant, seen from U.S. Highway 75
- Country: United States
- Location: Washington County, near Blair, Nebraska
- Coordinates: 41°31′13″N 96°4′38″W
- Status: Being decommissioned
- Construction began: 1966
- Commission date: August 9, 1973
- Decommission date: 2058
- Construction cost: $754.65 million (2007 USD)
- Owner: Omaha Public Power District
- Operator: Exelon Nuclear Partners

Nuclear power station
- Reactor type: Pressurized Water Reactor (PWR)
- Reactor supplier: Combustion Engineering

Power generation
- Units cancelled: 1 × 1136 MW
- Units decommissioned: 1 × 478.6 MW
- Nameplate capacity: 502 MW

External links
- Commons: Related media on Commons

The Fort Calhoun Nuclear Generating Station is a shut-down nuclear power plant located on 660 acres (2.7 km^{2}) between Fort Calhoun, and Blair, Nebraska adjacent to the Missouri River between mile markers 645.6 and 646.0. The utility has an easement for another 580 acres (2.3 km^{2}) which is maintained in a natural state. The power plant is owned by the Omaha Public Power District of Omaha, Nebraska. When operational, the plant accounted for 25 percent of OPPD's net generation capabilities.

The plant's single Combustion Engineering pressurized water reactor generated 484 megawatts of electricity. This was the smallest rated capacity among all operating commercial power reactors in North America, and as a single-unit plant, this also qualified it as the smallest rated capacity nuclear power plant. OPPD's two Nebraska City coal-fired plants at 682 (opened 2009) and 649 (opened 1979) MW are both significantly larger.

Fort Calhoun houses spent fuel rods in a 40-foot (12 m) deep spent fuel pool next to the reactor, and when the pool had nearly reached capacity in 2006, OPPD began to store spent fuel rods above ground in dry cask storage as well. In total, the Ft. Calhoun reactor has 600,000 to 800,000 pounds (270,000 to 360,000 kg) of high level nuclear waste. The storage was not designed to house spent fuel permanently, but when plans for Yucca Mountain nuclear waste repository were terminated, OPPD stated that they are "prepared to safely store material on-site as long as necessary".

The plant underwent refurbishment in 2006 by having its steam generators, pressurizer, reactor vessel head, low pressure turbines and main transformer replaced. In 2003, the plant had its operating license renewed for an additional twenty years. With the renewal, the license for Fort Calhoun was extended from August 9, 2013, to August 9, 2033.

The 2011 Missouri River floods surrounded the plant with flood water. The nuclear reactor had been shut down and defueled in April 2011 for scheduled refueling. A fire caused electricity to shut off in the spent fuel pools resulting in 90 minutes without cooling qualifying as a "red event", signifying a high-level threat to Fort Calhoun operations. The flood and resulting fire was called "one of the most serious safety incidents in recent years" and resulted in a three-year cold shut-down of the plant.

In August 2012 OPPD signed a deal for Exelon Nuclear Partners to manage the plant although OPPD would maintain ownership. In February 2017, OPPD ended the service contract with Exelon by paying a $5 million fee, but will also be subject to "wind-down" fees.

The plant was shut down on October 24, 2016.

== Surrounding population ==
The Nuclear Regulatory Commission defines two emergency planning zones around nuclear power plants: a plume exposure pathway zone with a radius of about 10 miles (16 km), concerned primarily with exposure to, and inhalation of, airborne radioactive contamination, and an ingestion pathway zone of about 50 miles (80 km), concerned primarily with ingestion of food and liquid contaminated by radioactivity. In 2010, the population within 10 miles of Fort Calhoun was 20,639; the population within 50 miles was 953,410. The closest major city is Omaha, with a population of 408,958, whose center is 18 miles (29 km) from the plant.

== Seismic risk ==
The Nuclear Regulatory Commission's estimate of the risk each year of an earthquake intense enough to cause core damage to the reactor at Fort Calhoun was 1 in 76,923, according to a NRC study published in August 2010.

== Flooding risk ==
A flood assessment performed by the Nuclear Regulatory Commission in 2010 indicated that the Fort Calhoun Nuclear Generating Station, "did not have adequate procedures to protect the intake structure and auxiliary building against external flooding events." The assessment also indicated that the facility was not adequately prepared for a "worst-case" flooding scenario. A number of potential flood water penetration points were discovered that could have impacted the raw feed water supply to the cooling system, the auxiliary water supply and main switchgear (electrical) room. By early 2011, corrective measures had been implemented. In 2009 the NRC did a flood risk assessment which found that the protection measures were only designed to handle floods to 1,009 feet (308 m) above sea level which was below the NRC mandated elevation of 1,014 feet (309 m) for the plant. The risk assessment stated that at 1,010 feet (310 m), flooding would have "led to a 100 percent chance of a fuel damage if the emergency gasoline pumps didn't work."

== 2011 flood and cold shutdown ==
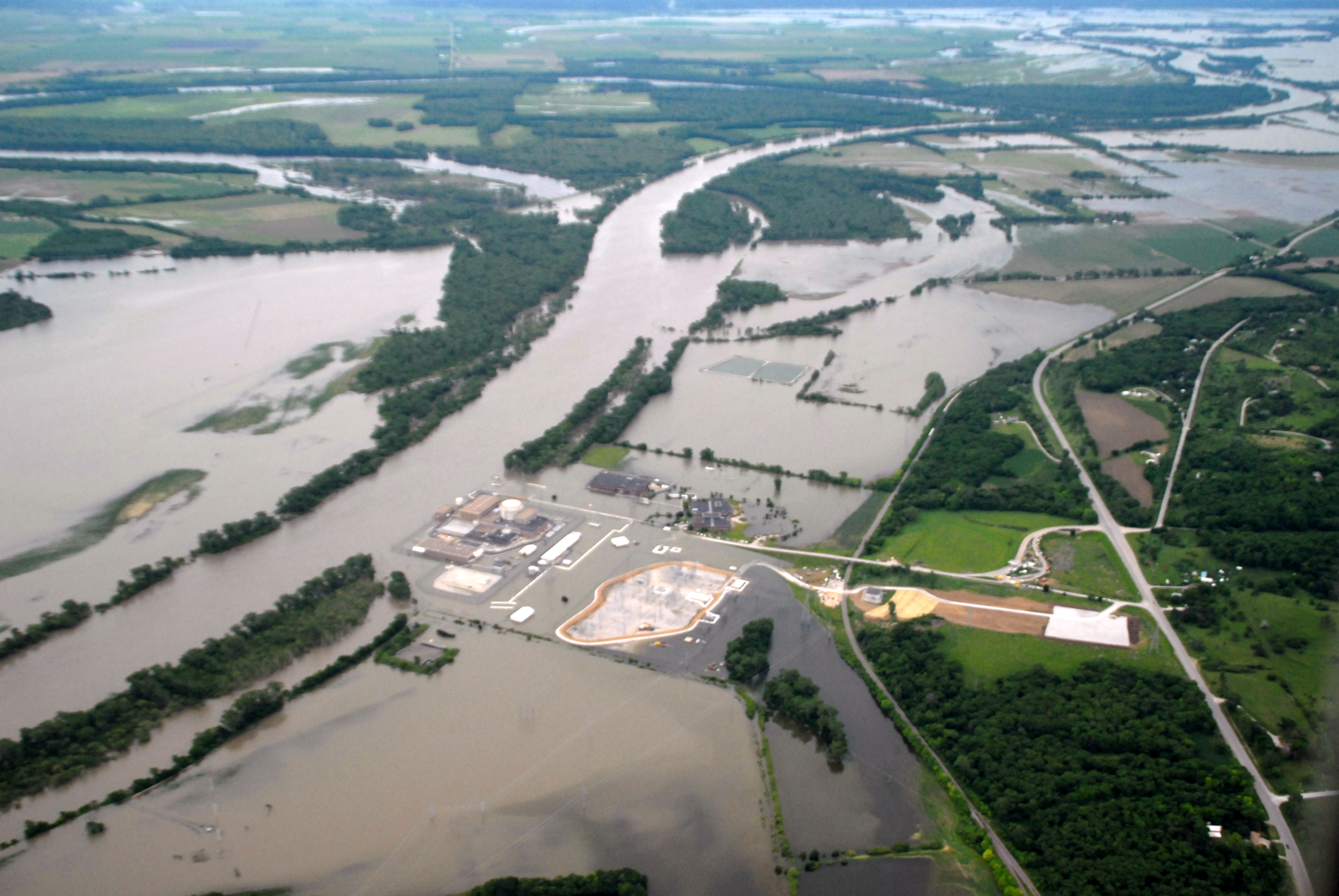
Fort Calhoun plant on June 16, 2011 during the 2011 Missouri River Floods; vital buildings were protected using water-filled perimeter "flood berms"

On June 6, 2011 the Omaha Public Power District, as required by Nuclear Regulatory Commission guidelines, declared a Notification of Unusual Event (minimal level on a 4 level taxonomy) due to flooding of the Missouri River. The Missouri River was above flood stage and expected to rise further, and to remain above flood stage for several weeks to a month. Contractors installed sandbags and earthen berms to protect the facility from flooding. According to officials, the plant was built to withstand a 500 year flooding event and, though by June 14 much of the facility was surrounded by the swollen Missouri River, Omaha Public Power District officials said they were confident that enough redundancies were in place to ensure adequate safety. It was reported on June 17, 2011 that the plant was in "safe cold shutdown" mode for refueling and the anticipation of flooding, and that four weeks' worth of additional fuel had been brought in to power backup generators, should they be needed. The Army Corps of Engineers indicated that with average precipitation, the Missouri River would not go above 1,008 feet (307 m) above sea level and OPPD officials stated that the current flood protection efforts would protect the plant to 1,010–1,012 feet (307.8–308.5 m) feet above sea level. Officials indicated the spent fuel pool is at 1,038.5 feet (316.5 m) above sea level.

On June 7, 2011, an electrical component in a switch gear room caused a small fire with Halon extinguisher activation which forced a partial evacuation. The fire was no longer burning when the on site fire brigade arrived and according to officials, the public was never in any danger. The fire impacted pumping of coolant water through the spent fuel pool. Cooling was interrupted for an hour and a half while the estimated time for the pool to reach boiling temperature was over 88 hours. In response, the Omaha Public Power District declared an alert (second level on a 4 level taxonomy). The evacuation was the first at the facility since 1992, when 20,000 US gallons (76,000 L; 17,000 imp gal) (ca. 76 t) of coolant leaked into a containment building from the reactor.

On June 23 a helicopter contracted by OPPD to survey transmission lines made an unplanned landing 1.5 miles (2.4 km) south of the plant. Reports described it as an unplanned landing although photographs showed it on its side in a field. Nobody was injured. The Federal Aviation Administration had declared a "temporary flight restriction," in a 2 nautical miles (3.7 km) radius, centered on the Fort Calhoun nuclear facility. This restriction went into effect on June 6, 2011, at 4:31 PM, and remains in effect "until further notice." Officials noted that the June 6 FAA directive was actually a reminder to a standing order creating no flight zones over all U.S. nuclear power plants which had been in effect after the 2001 9/11 attacks.

On June 26, at 1:30 a.m., an 8-foot (2.4 m) high, 2,000-foot (610 m) long water filled rubber "flood berm" that surrounded portions of the plant was punctured by a small earth mover ("Bobcat") and collapsed. The collapse of the flood berm allowed flood waters to surround the auxiliary and containment buildings at the plant, and also forced the temporary transfer of power from the external electricity grid to backup electrical generators. It was reported more than 2 feet (0.61 m) of water rushed in around buildings and electrical transformers. Backup generators were then used to ensure the facility maintained electrical power for cooling. The rupturing of the flood berm also resulted in approximately 100 US gallons (380 L; 83 imp gal) of petroleum being released into the river as many fuel containers were washed out. The fuel/oil containers were staged around the facility to supply fuel for pumps which remove water within the flood containment barriers. The rubber berm was a secondary measure not mandated by the NRC and was put in place by OPPD to provide additional room for work immediately outside the reactor buildings. According to the NRC, the water-filled berm "protects several pieces of equipment that have been brought onsite, including an additional emergency diesel generator for supplying AC electrical power, water pumps, firefighting equipment and sandbagging supplies". On July 11 OPPD installed a new 8-foot (2.4 m) inflatable berm as a replacement.

According to OPPD, the plant is designed to withstand waters up to 1,014 feet (309.1 m) above mean sea level. The river was not expected to exceed 1,008 feet (307.2 m). NRC officials were at the plant at the time and NRC statements said the plant remains safe. NRC Chairman Gregory Jaczko confirmed the plant's safety when he visited the plant on June 27.

On June 30 one of the pumps used to remove seepage caught fire when a worker was refilling it with gasoline. The worker put the fire out with a fire extinguisher but was burned on his arms and face and he was airlifted via helicopter to Lincoln, Nebraska. OPPD said the fire was in an auxiliary security building area and not in the reactor area and that the plant was never in danger.

=== Restart ===
Before restarting OPPD spent $180 million recommissioning the plant, and cleared a list of 450 corrective items issued by the NRC. The utility company raised rates twice whilst the plant was down, 5.9 percent in 2012 and 6.9 percent in 2013, citing these costs among other things. The newer problems discovered in 2012 inspection were not included in the calculations. After three years in cold shutdown, the plant regained full power again on December 26, 2013.

Two weeks later on January 9, 2014, the plant had to stop producing power again after workers discovered a damaged sluice gate. In mid-March 2014, during maintenance work on the plant's generator, the turbine cooling system began losing water, prompting the automatic failsafe system to shut down the turbines, then the reactor, according to a report filed with the Nuclear Regulatory Commission. The shutdown was expected to be temporary.

== Post-flood inspections ==
Inspections of the plant in 2012 meant to determine damage from the 2011 flooding led to the discovery that there were "problems inside the nuclear containment" that were not related to the flood, but had been ongoing for decades, according to a presentation by the NRC and detailed in a public meeting held by the Omaha Public Power District. OPPD discovered that under extreme circumstances, some of the structural supports inside the building that houses the reactor weren't strong enough to support the building. Nuclear industry whistleblower Arnie Gundersen said that the plant was "designed with hand calculations and slide rules in the 1960s" and that the Fort Calhoun plant managers had known about the "systemic" problems for "years if not decades", but had not told the NRC. He discussed the report:

They discovered that those calculations from the 60′s had errors ... also some of them are missing, and then some of them are just plain incomplete. But Omaha Public Power District admits ... that there were "incorrect and incomplete or missing calculations. There were inconsistencies between the calculations and the drawings. There were incomplete considerations of all load combinations and there were simple numerical errors."

David Lochbaum, the director of the Nuclear Safety Project for the Union of Concerned Scientists, said the structural problems should have been caught much earlier, and that if the NRC conducted "more than just spot checks," it might have uncovered them in 2003.

Wallace Taylor, an attorney on behalf of the Sierra Club, told the NRC that structural problems at the plant should have kept it from being licensed for operation:

At the public meeting in Blair, Nebraska, on September 11, 2012, it was revealed for the first time that there are design and construction problems in the original construction of the plant. It was not made clear how these design and construction defects can be corrected. This is a structural problem that would seemingly require significant reconstruction of the facility.

It also seems obvious that if these defects had been known at the time the reactor was originally licensed, this was a condition that would have warranted refusal to grant a license. Exactly one of the criteria for revoking a license.

Besides problems with the math used in its design, the plant came under scrutiny for failing to replace the Teflon used originally, as directed by the NRC in 1985. In that year, experts revealed that Teflon tends to disintegrate in the presence of high radiation. The plant replaced the Teflon in some places, but left it in others, making Fort Calhoun the only nuclear power plant in the US to use Teflon.

Subsequently, Teflon penetrations were replaced prior to the plant restart in 2014.

== Closure ==
On June 16, 2016 the Omaha Public Power District board voted unanimously to shut down the Fort Calhoun Plant. This decision was based on financial interest to both OPPD and its customers.

"Once closed, a nuclear plant must undergo a decommissioning process to remove or decontaminate materials and equipment that have been exposed to radioactivity. The Nuclear Regulatory Commission requires decommissioning to be completed within 60 years of a plant's closure."

Nuclear decommissioning options considered include the Safstor method, or Decon method. The Safstor method involves placing the facility into safe storage for 40 to 60 years, and proceeding with the decontamination after that time. "The Safstor decommissioning process — estimated at $1.2 billion through 2055 — would begin this year and be completed within 60 years." The Decon Method involves immediate dismantling of the site which would release the site for use in as few as 5 years.

On October 24, 2016 the plant was shut down.
