= C.W. Burdick Power Plant =

Municipal power plant in Nebraska, US

Coordinates: 40.922°N 98.328°W

C.W. Burdick Power Plant is a six-unit 187.5 MW natural gas/fuel oil power plant located in Grand Island, Nebraska. The facility is owned and operated by the City of Grand Island. It serves as a backup to the city's primary generating station, Platte Generating Station.

From 1906 to 1963, the Pine Street Station continued to supply most of Grand Island's electric power. In 1957, the C. W. Burdick station located on South Cherry and Bischeld streets started to take over for the aging Pine Street Station and to meet Grand Island's growing demand for electricity. Continued increases in electrical use and limited supplies of natural gas and oil forced the city to build another power plant.

In 2017 the C. W. Burdick station was decommissioned. The demolition and removal process is expected to be completed by July 2023.

== Pine Street Station ==
The first two electric generators were built where the original Pine Street station continues to stand today (about 1/2 block south of 4th and Pine Streets) and were accepted by the city on April 9, 1906. The electric generators were engine driven with a combined capacity of 325 kilowatts. By today's standards, that's enough generation to supply the needs of one or two large grocery stores, or about 50 homes. It is not known if these engines that turned the generators were steam driven (piston) engines or internal combustion engines.

From 1906 to 1963, the Pine Street Station continued to supply most of Grand Island's electric power. In 1957, the C.W. Burdick station located on south Cherry and Bischeld streets started to take over for the aging Pine Street Station and to meet Grand Island's growing demand for electricity. Continued increases in electrical use and limited supplies of natural gas and oil forced the city to build another power plant.

== Units ==
- Unit 1 is a 16.5 MW natural gas/No. 6 fuel oil Allis-Chalmers turbine that entered service in 1957.
- Unit 2 is a 22 MW natural gas/No. 6 fuel oil Allis-Chalmers turbine that entered service in 1963.
- Unit 3 is a 54 MW natural gas/No. 6 fuel oil General Electric turbine that entered service in 1972.

== Gas turbines ==
- GT1 is a 15 MW natural gas/No.2 fuel oil General Electric turbine that entered service in 1968.
- GT2 is a 40MW natural gas/No.2 fuel oil General Electric turbine that entered service in 2003.
- GT3 is a 40MW natural gas/No.2 fuel oil General electric turbine that entered service in 2003.
