= Southern Power District =

Southern Power District is a publicly owned electric distribution system providing electricity and related services to customers in south-central Nebraska. Based in Grand Island, Nebraska, its wholesale power provider is Nebraska Public Power District.

Southern Power District Service Area

Southern Power's additional offices are at Central City, Franklin, Hastings, and Holdrege.

== Employee information ==
Southern Power employs 108 people across its entire service area:

- Grand Island: 62
- Holdrege: 14
- Hastings: 12
- Central City: 14
- Franklin: 6
