= Lon D. Wright Power Plant =

Power station in Fremont, Nebraska

Lon D. Wright Memorial Power Plant
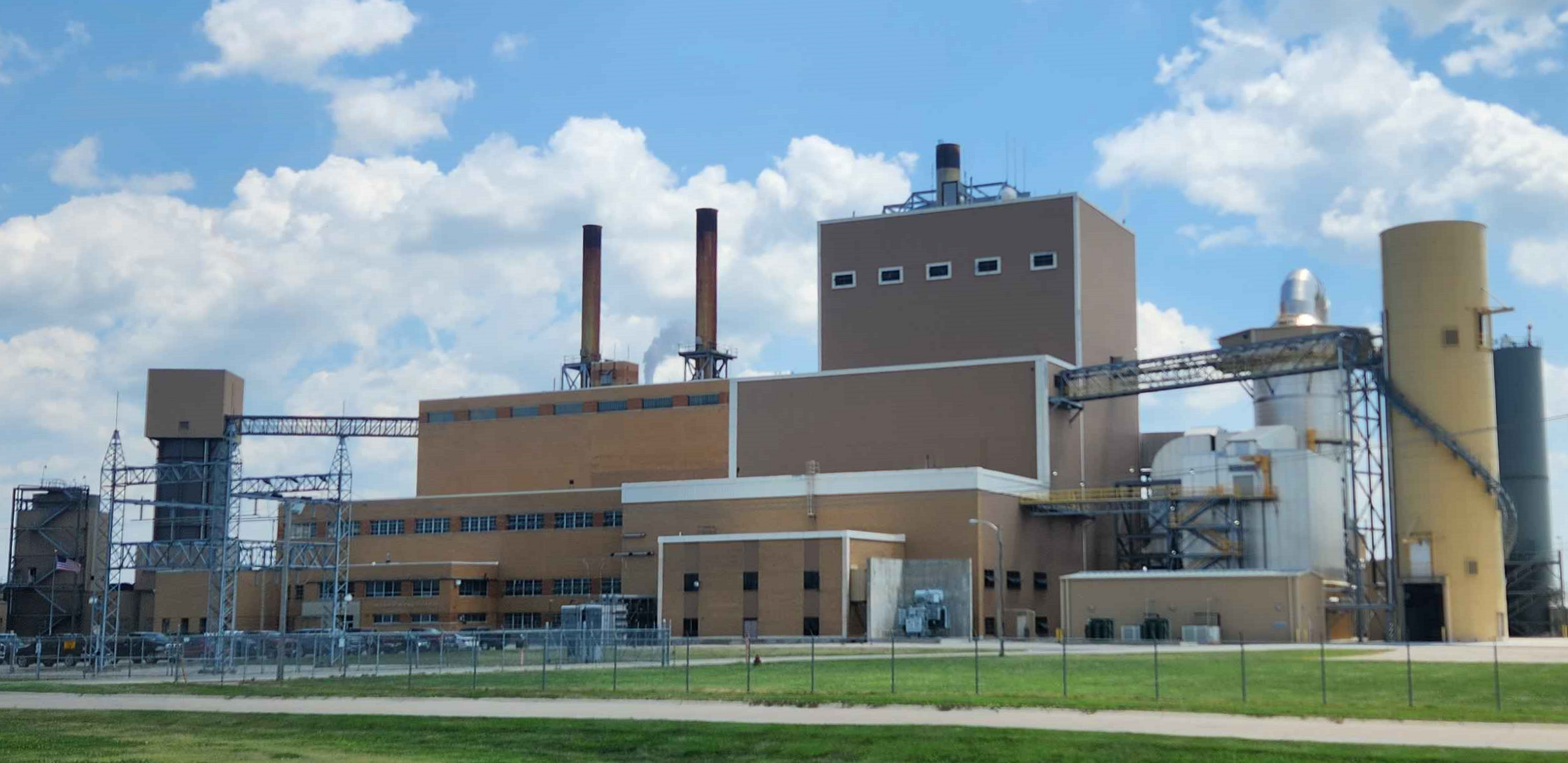
- The Lon D. Wright Memorial Power Plant in July 2024
- Country: United States
- Location: 3000 E 1st St; Fremont, Nebraska 68025
- Coordinates: 41.4279°N 96.4622°W
- Status: Commissioned
- Owner: City of Fremont Department of Utilities
- Operator: City of Fremont Department of Utilities

Power generation
- Nameplate capacity: 172.3 MW; 213.2 MW

External links
- Commons: Related media on Commons

The Lon D. Wright Memorial Power Plant is a 130-megawatt (MW) coal-fired power plant owned and operated by the City of Fremont Department of Utilities located in Fremont, Nebraska.The plant consists of 3 units labeled 6, 7, and 8 as a continuation of five units that were previously housed in a facility located in downtown Fremont.

== Units ==
=== Unit 6 ===
Unit 6 is a 17 MW coal-fired Babcock & Wilcox water tube boiler with a General Electric turbine and generator that entered commercial service in 1957. The unit can also be run on natural gas.

=== Unit 7 ===
Unit 7 is a 22 MW Babcock & Wilcox water tube boiler with a General Electric turbine and generator that entered commercial service in 1963. The unit can also be run on natural gas.

=== Unit 8 ===
Unit 8 is a 92 MW Babcock & Wilcox water tube boiler with a General Electric turbine and generator that entered commercial service in 1977. The unit can also be run on natural gas.

=== Air Quality Control System (AQCS) ===
In July 2013, the Fremont City council awarded a US$46.7 million bid to Fagen Inc. to add emission control equipment to Unit 8 to meet the Environmental Protection Agency's clean air standards. The project was completed and commissioned in late 2015.
