= Maryland Public Service Commission =

Independent administrative agency regulating public utilities

Agency overview
- Formed: 1910
- Jurisdiction: Maryland, United States
- Website: https://www.psc.state.md.us/

The Maryland Public Service Commission (PSC) is an independent administrative agency within the state government which regulates public utilities and certain taxi cab and other passenger services in Maryland. Similar to other state public utilities commissions, the Maryland PSC regulates and sets tariff rates for natural gas, electricity distribution, local telephone, water, and sewage disposal companies. The PSC also sets the tariff rates for pilot services for vessels and privately owned toll bridges, approves the construction of electric generating plants and overhead transmission lines with a voltage above 69 kV, and licenses retail natural gas and electricity suppliers. The PSC offices are located in Baltimore in the William Donald Schaefer Building.

== Members of the Public Service Commission ==
The five PSC commissioners serve staggered five-year terms, are appointed by the Governor, and are confirmed by the Senate of the Maryland General Assembly. Commissioners may begin serving immediately upon appointment, but the governor may withdraw the appointments of unconfirmed commissioners. By statute the commissioners must be representative of the state's regions and demographics.

Current Commissioners
Name	Appointed By	Date First Appointed	Date Reappointed	Current Term Expires
Chair Kumar Barve	Gov. Moore (D)	January 12, 2026		June 30, 2028
Ryan C. McLean	Gov. Moore (D)	July 1, 2025		June 30, 2030
Bonnie Suchman	Gov. Moore (D)	June 2023		June 30, 2027
Odogwu Obi Linton	Gov. Moore (D)	2025		June 30, 2026
Frederick H. Hoover	Gov. Moore (D)	January 12, 2026		June 30, 2029

Kumar Barve was initially appointed to finish a partial term ending June 30, 2024, and was later reappointed to a full five-year term that will begin on July 1, 2024 and run through June 30, 2029.

== Agency operations ==
The PSC enforces the state statutes in the Public Utilities article of the Annotated Code of Maryland. Hearings on matters subject to the jurisdiction of the PSC are conducted before the Commission or by its public utility law judges (PULJs). The PSC has an independent division of PULJs who issue proposed orders, which may be appealed to the Commission. Most hearings are held in the PSC offices in Maryland, but state statutes require public hearings for some subject matter to be held in the county or municipality affected by the proceeding. Final orders are issued by the Commission and are subject to judicial review in the state circuit courts. The PSC publishes a selection of its orders each year along with its annual report to the Maryland General Assembly in its own case reporter.

== History ==
Supported by a plank in the Maryland Democratic Party state electoral platform to enact a regulatory utility law and by Governor Austin Crothers, the PSC was established in 1910. The initial purpose of the PSC was to fix the rates of steam railroads, street railways, ferries, toll bridges, and gas, electric, heating, water, telegraph, telephone, and water utilities, but the PSC also had the authority to hear complaints about service.

In December 1911, William Ashbie Hawkins represented several plaintiffs before the PSC protesting against the segregated conditions both in boats and trains under the state's Jim Crow laws. In October 1911, Hawkins, outraged at poor sleeping and eating conditions for black people on Chesapeake Bay ferryboats, took the Baltimore, Chesapeake and Atlantic Railway Company to court. Though his complaint was dismissed, the PSC did recommend, on February 13, 1912, that the company upgrade its facilities for black people and occasionally required upgrades to facilities consistent with the "separate but equal" requirements of that time. A series of complaints were filed in 1911 challenging conditions faced by African-Americans on steam boats regulated by the PSC due to the segregated facilities provided under the recently enacted Maryland Jim Crow laws.

In 1999, legislation titled the Electric Customer Choice and Competition Act of 1999 was enacted to restructure the electric industry and electric generation was deregulated.

== Electric generating plants ==
Although the PSC, as a result of the 1999 deregulation of the state electric industry, no longer regulates the cost of electricity generated in plants located in Maryland, it still is responsible for the approval of electric generating plants and transmission lines and for the approval of certain modifications. An entity planning to construct or modify a generation plant or transmission line must receive a Certificate of Public Convenience and Necessity (CPCN) from the PSC. An application for a CPCN must first be filed with the PSC and is then reviewed before a PULJ in a formal adjudicatory process, which includes an opportunity for public participation. Since the PSC is an independent commission, the Maryland Department of Natural Resources (DNR) Power Plant Research Program (PPRP) is responsible for the coordination of the State agencies' review. This coordinated review process allows the State to examine potential impacts upon its natural and cultural resources, environment and economy and typically culminates in a set of recommended licensing conditions. In addition, the PSC Staff and a State agency charged with protecting the interests of electricity ratepayers, the Office of People's Council (OPC), intervenes in the case and can present their arguments and opinions. Upon completion of the adjudicatory and public hearings, the PULJ will issue a proposed order. After a period which an appeal can be made to the full commission, a final order is released either granting or denying the application. Certain small generating plants, including most emergency generators, are approved using an abbreviated process.

Although there are approximately 40 generating plants that provide power for customers in the state, Maryland imported about 35% of its electricity from neighboring states in 2008.

Electric generating stations in Maryland larger than 50 MW
Station	Type	Operator	Location	Capacity (MW)
Brandon Shores	Bituminous coal	Raven Power	Orchard Beach	1370
Charles P. Crane	Bituminous coal	Raven Power	Bowleys Quarters	416
Calvert Cliffs	Nuclear	Exelon, Électricité de France	Lusby	1829
Chalk Point	Oil, gas	NRG Energy	Eagle Harbor	2647
Conowingo	Hydroelectric	Exelon Corporation	Conowingo	507
Criterion Wind Project	Wind	Constellation	Oakland	70
Dickerson	Coal, oil, gas	NRG Energy	Dickerson	930
Easton		Easton Utilities	Easton	72
Gould Street	Natural gas	Constellation	Baltimore	103
Herbert A. Wagner	Coal, oil, gas	Raven Power	Orchard Beach	1058
Luke Mill		NewPage Corporation	Luke	65
Montgomery County; Resource Recovery Facility	Waste	Northeast Maryland; Waste Disposal Auth.	Dickerson	68
Morgantown	Coal	NRG Energy	Morgantown	1548
Notch Cliff		Constellation	Glen Arm	144
Panda Brandywine		Panda Energy	Brandywine	289
Perryman		Constellation	Perryman	404
Philadelphia Road		Constellation	Baltimore County	83
Riverside	Natural gas	Constellation	Dundalk	257
Rock Springs	Natural gas	The Carlyle Group	Rock Springs	773
Sparrows Point		Severstal	Sparrows Point	120
Vienna	Oil	NRG Energy	Vienna	167
Warrior Run	Bituminous coal	AES Corporation	Cumberland	229
Westport		Constellation	Baltimore	122
Wheelabrator Baltimore	Waste	Waste Management, Inc.	Baltimore	65

Future electric generating stations in Maryland (larger than 50 MW)
Station	Type	Operator	Location	Capacity (MW)
Waldorf	Natural gas	Competitive Power Ventures	Waldorf, Charles County	725
	Natural gas	Panda Energy	Brandywine, Prince George's County	858
	Natural gas	Public Service Enterprise Group		755

Former electric generating stations in Maryland (larger than 50 MW)
Station	Type	Operator	Location	Capacity (MW)
R. Paul Smith (closed 2012)	Bituminous coal	FirstEnergy	Williamsport	109

Base load coal and nuclear generating plants generate the greater portion of electricity in Maryland. Coal-fired plants producing 39.3% of the state's electric generation in 2008 with nuclear plants generating 13.8%, oil and gas plants 41.2%, and hydroelectric plants and other renewables providing the remainder. In a 2010 report the PSC reported that 70% of the electric generating capacity in the state came from plants that were over 30 years old. As of 2015, the Supreme Court of the United States was reviewing whether Maryland is allowed to subsidize new power plants.

== Passenger carriers ==
Passenger carriers (including taxicabs) operating intrastate in Maryland must obtain a certificate to operate in Maryland. Carriers operating in Montgomery or Prince George's Counties that will also operate interstate into Washington, DC, or the cities and counties in Virginia that border Washington must also register with the Washington Metropolitan Area Transit Commission.
