= List of power stations in Maryland =

Sources of Maryland utility-scale electricity generation in gigawatt-hours, full-year 2025:
1. Natural gas: 16,015 (42.5%)
2. Nuclear: 14,795 (39.3%)
3. Coal: 2,294 (6.09%)
4. Hydroelectric: 1,575 (4.18%)
5. Solar: 1,329 (3.53%)
6. Wind: 685 (1.82%)
7. Petroleum: 381 (1.01%)
8. Biomass: 297 (0.79%)
9. Other: 300 (0.80%)

This is a list of electricity-generating power stations in the U.S. state of Maryland, sorted by type and name. In 2024, Maryland had a total summer capacity of 11.7 GW through all of its power plants, and a net generation of 35,425 GWh. In 2025, the electrical energy generation mix was 42.5% natural gas, 39.3% nuclear, 6.1% coal, 4.2% hydroelectric, 3.5% solar, 1.8% wind, 1% petroleum, 0.8% biomass, and 0.8% other. Small-scale solar, which includes customer-owned PV panels, delivered an additional net 1,681 GWh of energy to Maryland's electrical grid in 2025. This was about 25 percent more than the generation of the state's utility-scale PV plants.

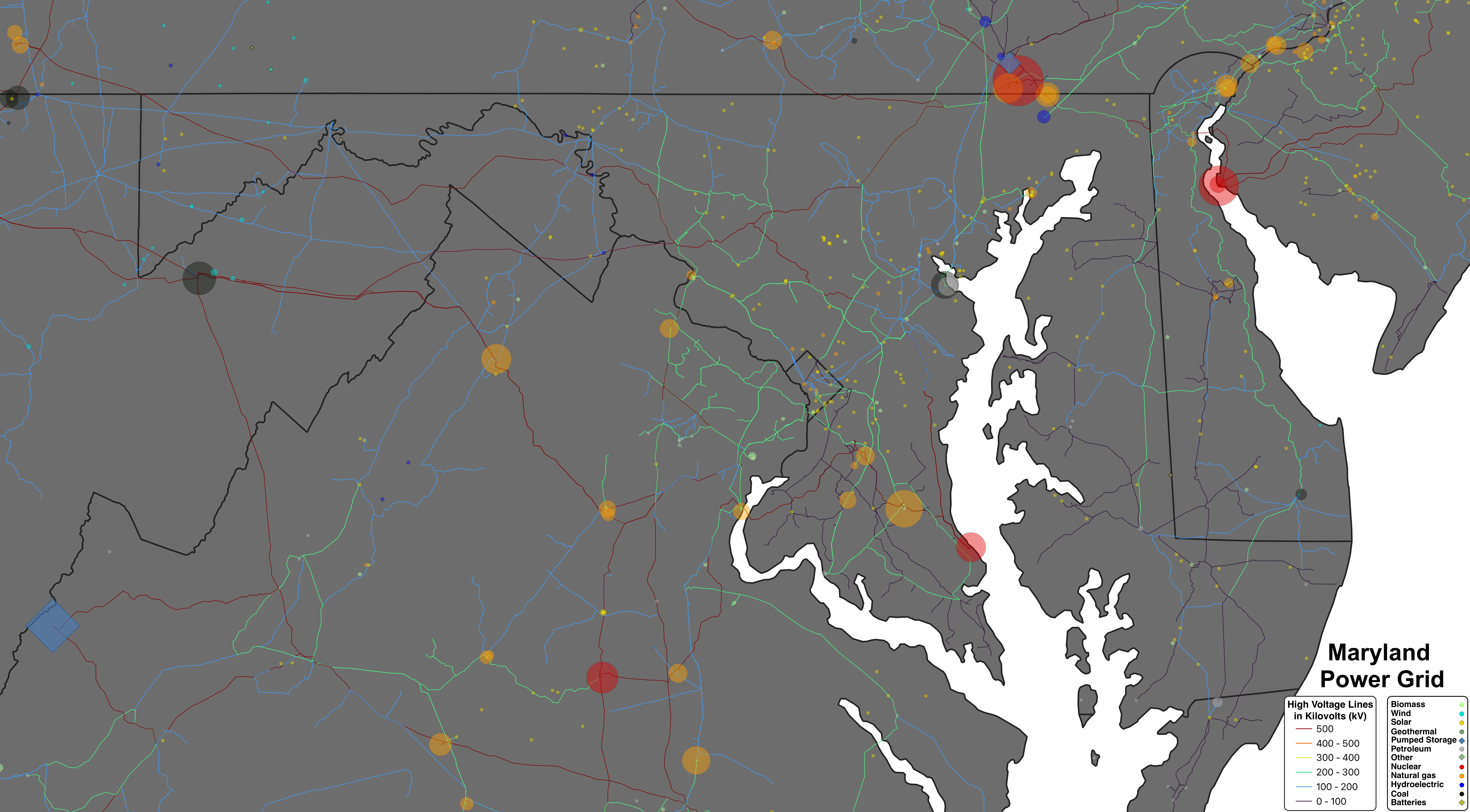
Maryland power grid

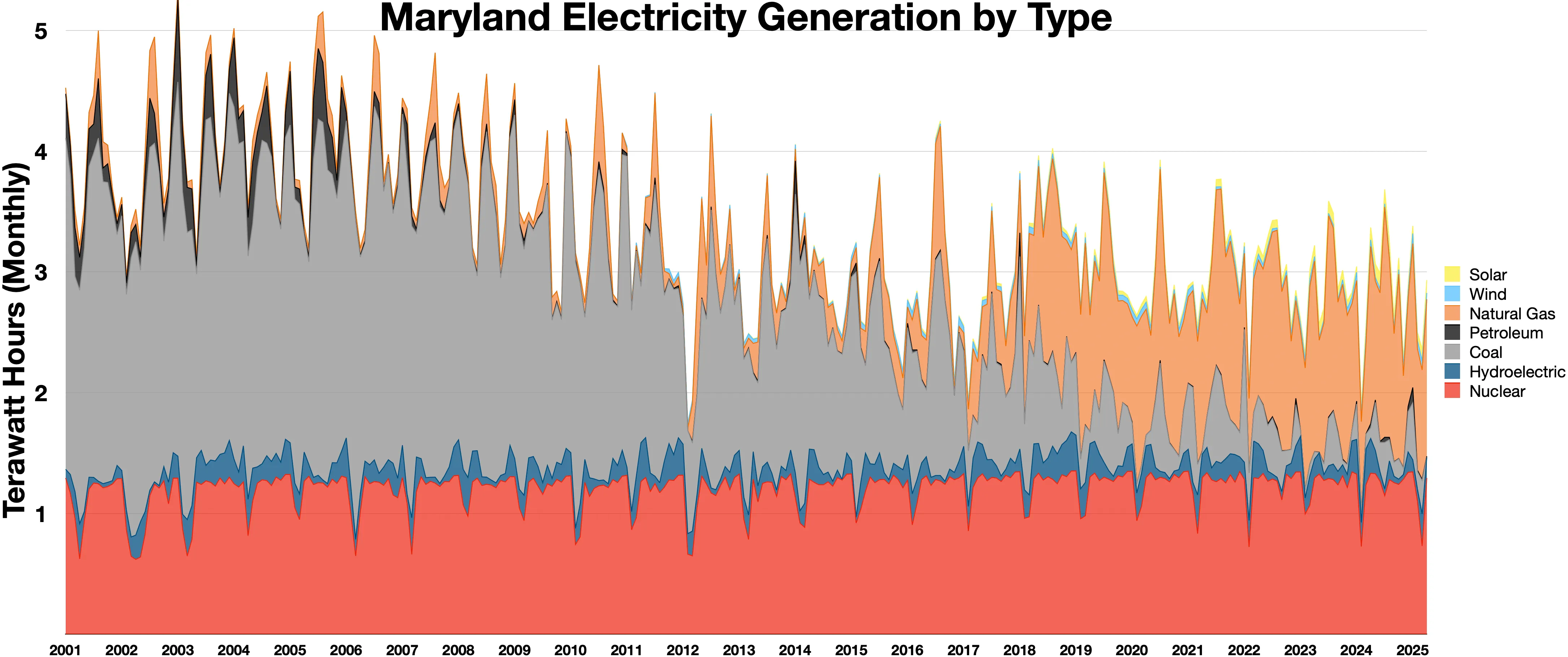
Maryland electricity generation by type

== Nuclear plants ==
Name	Location	Capacity (MW)	Operator	Year opened	Ref
Calvert Cliffs Nuclear Power Plant	Calvert County	1,707.8	Constellation Energy	1975/1977	

== Fossil-fuel plants ==
=== Coal ===
Name	Location	Capacity (MW)	Operator	Year opened	Scheduled closure
Brandon Shores Generating Station	Anne Arundel County, Maryland	1,370	Talen Energy	1984	2029

=== Retired coal ===
Name	Location	Capacity (MW)	Operator	Year opened	Year retired
Charles P. Crane Generating Station	Bowleys Quarters, Maryland	399	Avenue Capital Group	1961	2018
Dickerson Generating Station	Montgomery County, Maryland	588	NRG Energy	1959	August 2020
Luke Mill Power Plant	Luke, Maryland	65	Verso Corporation	1958	2019
R. Paul Smith Power Station	Williamsport, Maryland	116	FirstEnergy	1927	2012
Morgantown Generating Station	Newburg, Maryland	1,252	NRG Energy	1970	May 2022
Chalk Point Generating Station	Eagle Harbor, Maryland	728	NRG Energy	1964	June 2021
Warrior Run Generating Station	Cumberland, Maryland	229	AES Corporation	2000	June 2024

=== Natural gas ===
Name	Location	Capacity (MW)	Operator	Year opened	Current status
Chalk Point Generating Station	Prince George's	1,868	NRG Energy	1975/1981/1990/1991	
Dickerson Generating Station	Montgomery	326	NRG Energy	1992	
Gould Street Generating Station	Baltimore City	103	Constellation Power	1952	Demolition (2020)
Herbert A. Wagner Generating Station	Anne Arundel	133	H.A. Wagner	1956	
Notch Cliff Generating Station	Baltimore	144	Constellation Power	1969	Decommissioned
Panda Brandywine Power Plant	Prince Georges's	289	KMC Thermo	1996	
Perryman Generating Station	Harford	333	Constellation Power	1995/2015	
PSEG Keys Energy Center	Prince George's	755	PSEG Power	2018	
Rock Springs Generation Facility	Cecil	772	Essential Power Rock Springs	2003	
St. Charles Energy Center	Charles	746	CPV Maryland	2017	
Westport Generating Station	Baltimore City	121	Constellation Power	1969	Decommissioned 1993

=== Petroleum ===
- Chalk Point Generating Station
- Crisfield Energy Center
- Dickerson Generating Station
- Easton Power Plant
- Herbert A. Wagner Generating Station
- Morgantown Generating Station
- Perryman Generating Station
- Philadelphia Road Generating Station
- Vienna Generating Station
- Westport Generating station

== Renewable plants ==
Data from the U.S. Energy Information Administration serves as a general reference.

=== Waste-to-energy ===
- Montgomery County Resource Recovery Facility
- Wheelabrator Baltimore

=== Wind ===
- Criterion Wind Project
- Fair Wind
- Fourmile Ridge
- Roth Rock Wind Farm

=== Solar ===
- Annapolis Solar Park
- Fort Detrick Solar
- Great Bay Solar
- Longview Solar
- Maryland Solar
- Mount Saint Mary's
- Rockfish Solar
- Wye Mills

=== Hydroelectric ===
- Conowingo Dam
- Deep Creek Dam

=== Biomass ===
- Back River Waste Water Treatment
- Brown Station Road Plant
- East Correctional Institute
- Eastern Landfill Gas
- Millersville LFG
- Montgomery County Oaks LFG
- Wicomico

== See also ==
- List of power stations in the United States
