= Southern Maryland Electric Cooperative =

Headquartered in Hughesville, Maryland, US

Southern Maryland Electric Cooperative, Inc.
- Type: Cooperative
- Industry: Electric utility
- Founded: 1937
- Headquarters: Hughesville, Maryland, US
- Key people: Sonja Cox
- Products: Electricity
- Revenue: US$370 million (2006)
- Website: smeco.coop

The Southern Maryland Electric Cooperative (SMECO) is an electric distribution cooperative headquartered in Hughesville, Maryland, United States. SMECO serves approximately 161,000 customers in Calvert, Charles, Prince George's, and St. Mary's counties of southern Maryland. Under its rules as a nonprofit cooperative, SMECO passes on its costs to its customer-members without markup or profit.

== History ==
In 1937, two committees of citizens from three counties sought aid to construct a local rural electric distribution system under the New Deal's Rural Electrification Administration. They formed the Southern Maryland Tri-County Electric Cooperative Association, which was reorganized as a cooperative under the SMECO name in 1942. Customers were allowed to select suppliers of electricity beginning in 2001 under the Maryland Electric Deregulation legislation enacted in 1999. From 2007 to 2011, SMECO won the J.D. Power and Associates award for best customer service for a midsize utility.

SMECO owned a 77 MW gas turbine generator located at the Chalk Point Generating Station, which began operation in 1990 and was operated and maintained by NRG Energy. In 2015, NRG acquired the turbine plant from SMECO.

== FERC solar complaint ==
SMECO has filed a complaint with the US Federal Energy Regulatory Commission (FERC), alleging that the Maryland Public Service Commission (PSC) coerced utilities into purchasing excess solar power generated by the state's community solar program at much higher retail rates, rather than paying the amount it would have cost these utilities to generate the power themselves, also known as the avoided cost. This would be in violation of the federal Public Utility Regulatory Policies Act (PURPA), which establishes that any payment given to such qualifying power plants should equate to the utility's avoided cost. In addition, PURPA mandates that these plants do not exceed 80 MW of power.

Recently, the development of community solar programs has become increasingly prevalent to meet the ever-growing demand for new, viable energy sources. However, there has been much controversy regarding the surge in net metering consumers due to the resulting cost shifts, which negatively affect the non-solar community now facing much higher payments to offset the increased benefits given to solar projects.

Because of the continual reduction in the cost of power, FERC has become more concerned with the discrepancy between avoided costs and prevailing wholesale prices. This has placed more focus on PURPA's roles and responsibilities in maintaining and balancing the current energy market.
