= Chalk Point Generating Station =

Electricity-generating plant in Maryland, US

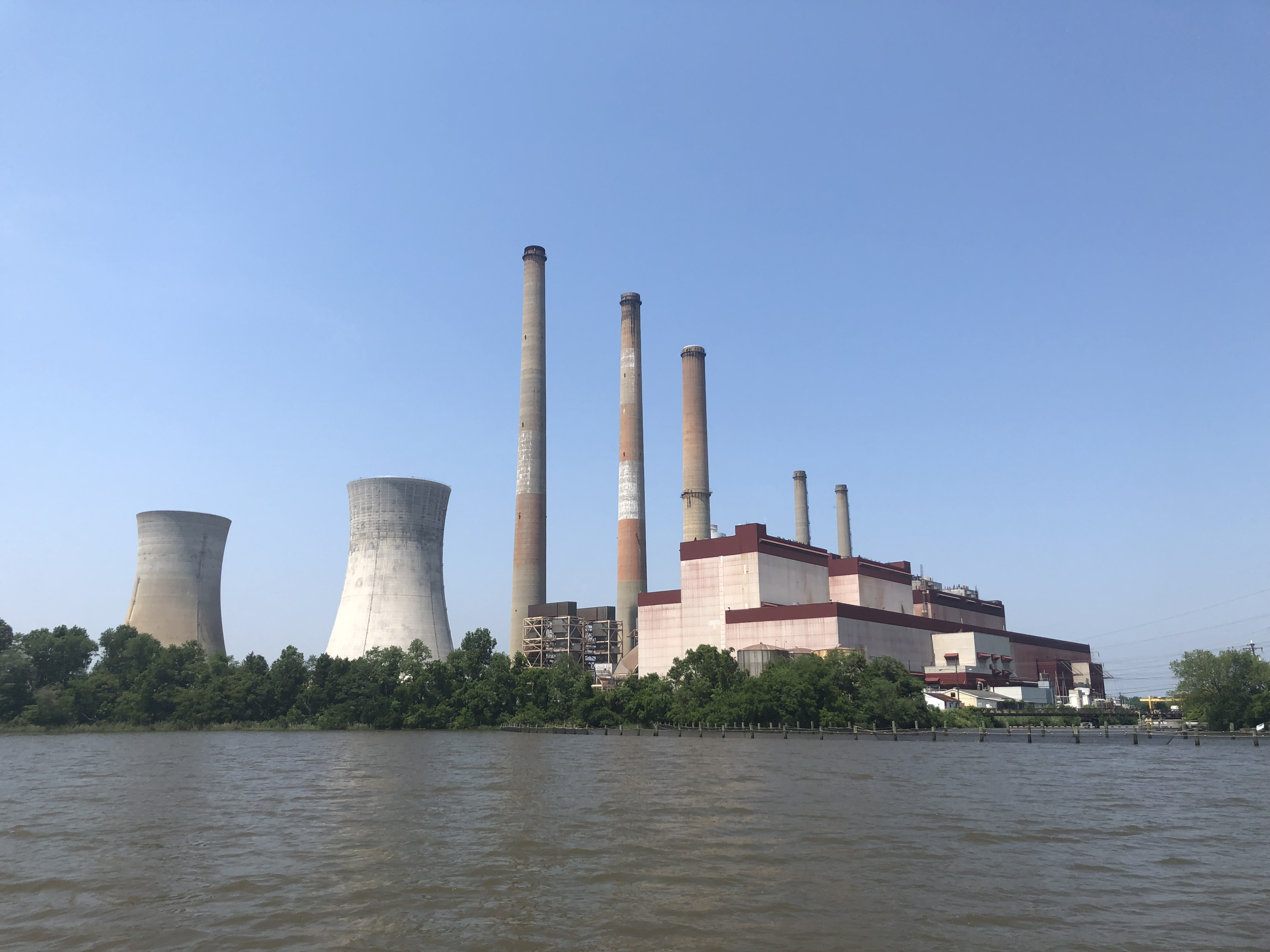
- Chalk Point Generating Station in 2019
- Country: United States
- Location: Eagle Harbor, Maryland
- Coordinates: 38°32′37″N 76°41′19″W
- Status: Operational
- Commission date: 1964
- Decommission date: June 2021 (Unit 1 & 2)
- Owner: NRG Energy

Thermal power station
- Primary fuel: Oil and natural gas (Units 3 & 4)

Power generation
- Units operational: 2 × 659 MWe (Units 3 & 4)
- Nameplate capacity: 1,809 MW; 2,553 MW

External links
- Commons: Related media on Commons

The Chalk Point Generating Station is an electricity-generating plant, comprising oil and natural gas fired units, owned by NRG Energy, located near the town of Eagle Harbor, Maryland, United States, on the Patuxent River.

Plant operator GenOn Energy Holdings closed the two coal-fired units at the plant in June 2021. Environmental and community advocates supported the closure, but highlighted the lack of plan in Maryland to support a "Just Transition" for the community and employees of the plant.

== Individual Units ==
The facility consists of Units 3 and 4, which are oil and natural gas fired units rated at 659 MWe each, put into service in 1975 and 1981. These units are cooled by natural draft cooling towers. The units comprise seven combustion turbines owned and operated by NRG.

- Oil-fired units GT1 and GT2 (put into service in 1967 and 1974) are rated at 16 MWe and 35 MWe.
- Oil/gas-fired units GT3–GT6 (put into service in 1991) are rated at 103, 103, 125, and 125 MWe respectively.
- Unit SGT1, an oil/gas-fired combustion turbine, is rated at 94 MWe and was put into service in 1990. The turbine was owned by the Southern Maryland Electric Cooperative (SMECO) until 2015, when it was acquired by NRG.

The combined name-plate capacity of all seven combustion turbines is 601 MWe.

Units ST1 and ST2, closed in 2021, are coal-fired dry-bottom, wall-fired steam generating plants rated at 364 MWe each. They were put into service in 1964 and 1965.

== History ==
The Chalk Point plant began service in 1964. All of the GenOn generating units at the Chalk Point Generating Station were built by the Potomac Electric Power Company, which sold them to the Southern Company in December 2000 as a result of the restructuring of the electricity generating industry in Maryland. The station was included in the Mirant spin-off from the Southern Company in April 2001. Mirant was merged into GenOn Energy in 2010, and GenOn merged into NRG in 2012.

In 2013 NRG signaled that it planned to retire the Chalk Point Generating Station and Dickerson Generating Station in May 2017 but the plant held on for at least another decade. GenOn announced in August 2020 that it planned to shut down the two coal-fired units in June 2021. Environmental and community advocates supported the closure, but highlighted the lack of plan in Maryland to support a Just Transition for the community and employees of the plant.

== Fuel delivery ==
Coal was delivered to the Chalk Point generating station by CSX Transportation trains via the Herbert Subdivision, a former Pennsylvania Railroad (PRR) line. This line is accessed via the Amtrak Northeast Corridor line. The coal was delivered from trains staged at the CSX Benning Yard (also former PRR facilities) in Anacostia, Washington, DC.

== Dispatch of electricity ==
The electrical output of Chalk Point Generating Station is dispatched by the PJM Interconnection regional transmission organization.

== Environmental impacts ==
In 2006 the U.S. Environmental Protection Agency (EPA) reported that the Chalk Point plant emitted over 21 lbs/MWh of sulfur dioxide (SO_{2}), ranked as the 24th largest such emitter in the United States. It was ranked as the 43rd largest emitter of nitrogen oxides (NO_{x}). In 2010 EPA reported that Chalk Point emitted 4.7 million metric tons of carbon dioxide (CO_{2}). In 2019 the plant emitted 0.6 million metric tons of CO_{2}.

In August 2018, the Maryland Department of the Environment (MDE) required three generating stations across the state, including Chalk Point, to meet current federal wastewater standards (effluent guidelines) by November 2020. The coal-fired units at these plants discharged arsenic and mercury to their respective receiving waters, as allowed by 1980s-era pollution standards under expired permits. Upgrading the plants' treatment systems to Maryland's current standards "could reduce discharges of toxic metals by 97 percent." EPA published the updated federal standards in 2015.

== See also ==
- List of largest power stations in the United States
- List of power stations in Maryland
