= Dickerson Generating Station =

Electric generating plant near Dickerson, Maryland, US

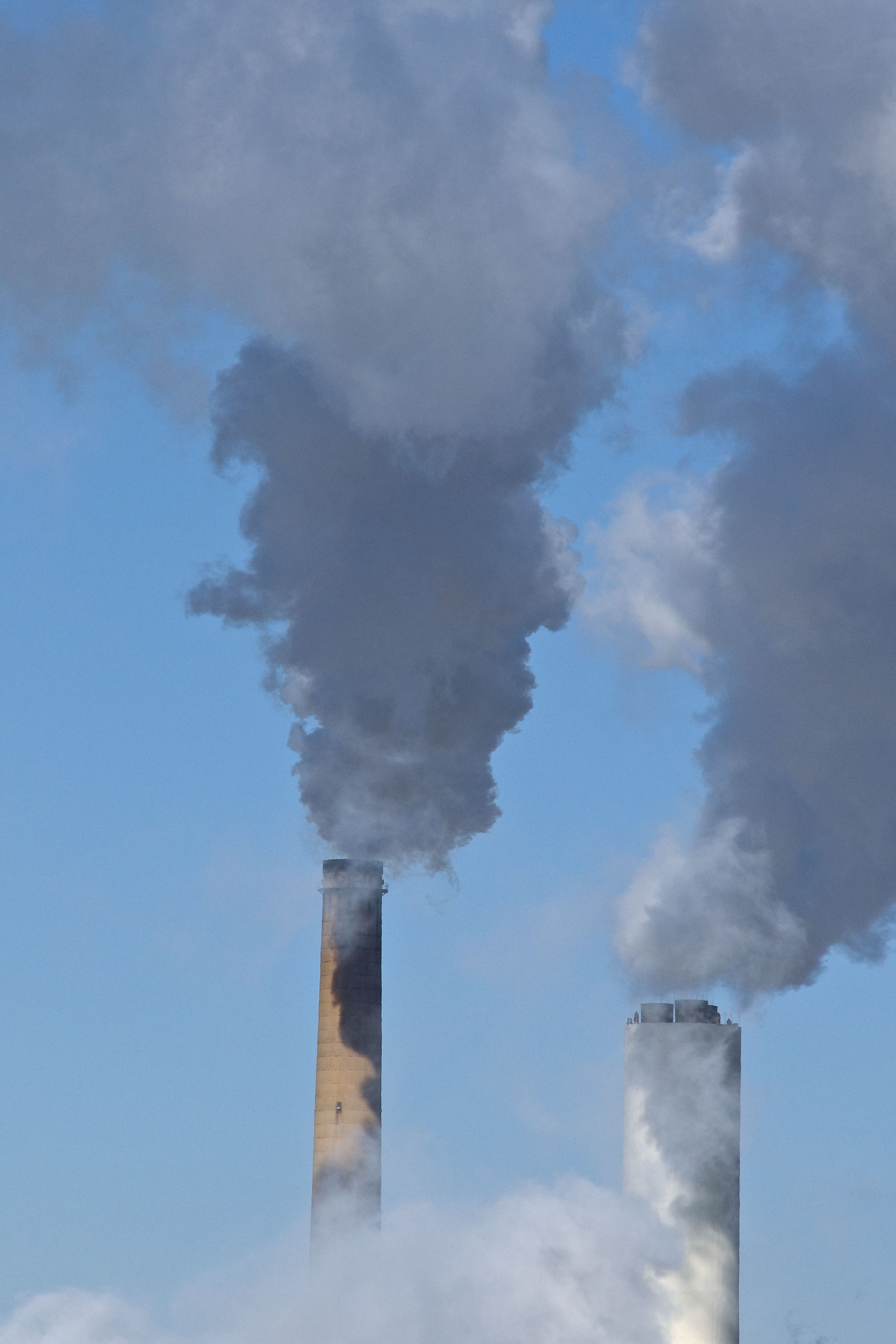
- Montgomery County, Maryland co-generating facility in 2009
- Country: United States
- Location: Montgomery County, near Dickerson, Maryland
- Coordinates: 39°12′36″N 77°27′54″W
- Status: Decommissioned
- Commission date: 1959
- Decommission date: August 2020
- Owner: NRG Energy

Thermal power station
- Primary fuel: Bituminous coal, natural gas, fuel oil

Power generation
- Units operational: 6
- Make and model: General Electric
- Nameplate capacity: 853 MW

The Dickerson Generating Station is an 853 MW electric generating plant owned by NRG Energy, located approximately two miles west of Dickerson, Maryland, on the eastern banks of the Potomac River.

== Description ==
The facility consists of three 182 MW coal-fired steam generating plants, two 147 MW gas and oil-fired simple cycle combustion turbines, and one 13 MW black start and peaking turbine. The three coal-fired units are base-loaded and went into operation in 1959, 1960, and 1962 respectively. Condenser cooling for these units is accomplished with once-through cooling water from the Potomac River at a rate of up to 400 million US gallons (1,500,000 m^{3}) per day. Coal was delivered to the Dickerson Generating Station by CSX Transportation train. The two combustion turbines are General Electric Frame 7F gas turbines which went into operation in 1992 and 1993, and are normally fired with natural gas from a Consolidated Natural Gas company pipeline which traverses the Dickerson site.

The generation plant's site property abuts the Chesapeake and Ohio Canal National Historical Park, which follows along the Potomac River. The C&O Canal structures nearest to the plant are Lock 27 and the Monocacy Aqueduct.

== History ==
The Dickerson plant began service in 1959. All of the generating plants were built by the Potomac Electric Power Company, which sold them to the Southern Company in December 2000 as a result of the restructuring of the electricity generating industry in Maryland. The station was included in the spin-off from the Southern Company of Mirant in April 2001. Mirant was merged into GenOn Energy in 2010, and GenOn merged into NRG in 2012.

In 1991, the 900-foot-long (270 m) cooling water discharge channel from the power plant, which empties into the Potomac River, became the Dickerson Whitewater Course, a canoe and kayak training facility for the 1992 Olympic Games.

In December 2009, a $1.1 billion emissions upgrade was completed. A new stack and cooling system reduced the amount of waste heat going into the cooling water discharge channel.

In 2013, NRG filed notice that it planned to decommission the coal generators by 2017, citing state emissions requirements. In May 2015, NRG filed notice to delay deactivation until May 2019. In February 2016, NRG withdrew its de-activation notice for the coal-fired units.

In May 2020, GenOn Holdings announced it would retire the three coal generating units, citing unfavorable market conditions and increased costs associated with environmental compliance. The coal units were shut down later in 2020.

== Pollution ==
In August 2016 the Maryland Department of the Environment (MDE) fined Dickerson $1 million for releasing illegal amounts of nitrogen into the Potomac River.

In August 2018 MDE required the Dickerson plant to meet current federal wastewater standards (effluent guidelines) by November 2020. The plant discharges arsenic and mercury to the Potomac River according to 1980s-era standards under expired permits. Upgrading the plant's treatment systems to Maryland's current standards "could reduce discharges of toxic metals by 97 percent." The U.S. Environmental Protection Agency published the updated federal standards in 2015.

== Operations ==
NRG operates the combustion turbines as peaking generation. The Dickerson Generating Station is dispatched by the PJM Interconnection regional transmission organization.

In 2008 the plant's flue-gas desulfurization system consumed 190,000 tons of limestone and generated 310,000 of synthetic gypsum.

== Montgomery County Resource Recovery Facility ==
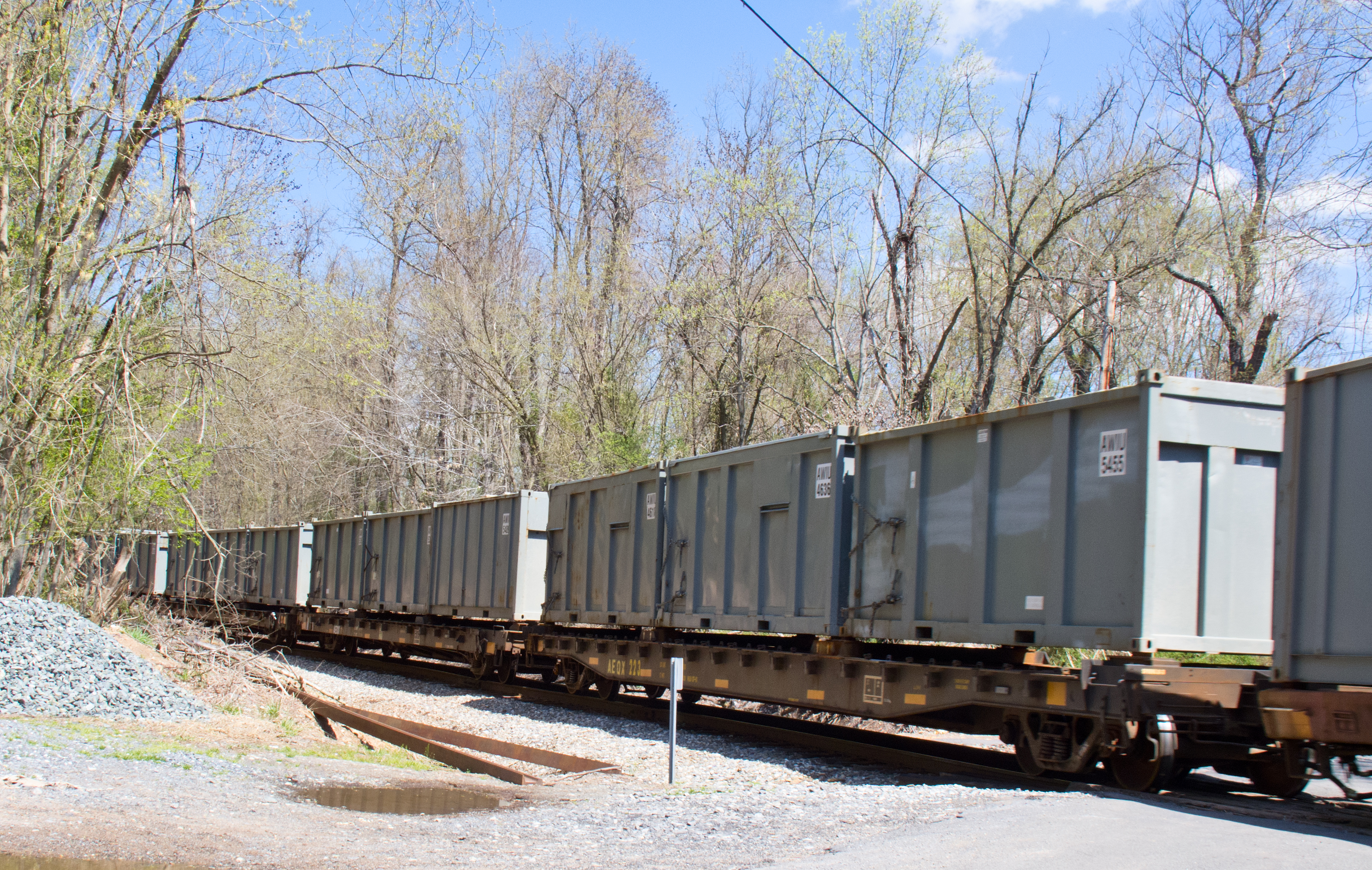
Trash train returning from Dickerson plant (on Dickerson spur line), going back to Derwood, Maryland

The Montgomery County Resource Recovery Facility, a 56 MW generating incineration plant that burns municipal garbage and waste, is next to the Dickerson Generating Station. This waste-to-energy plant is served by the CSX railroad line, which delivers trash from a central collection center in Derwood to the plant. The facility began operations in 1995 and is operated by the Northeast Maryland Waste Disposal Authority, a state-owned corporation.

== See also ==
- List of power stations in Maryland
