= Riverside Generating Station =

Electric generating station in Dundalk, Maryland, US

Coordinates: 39°14′18″N 76°30′56″W

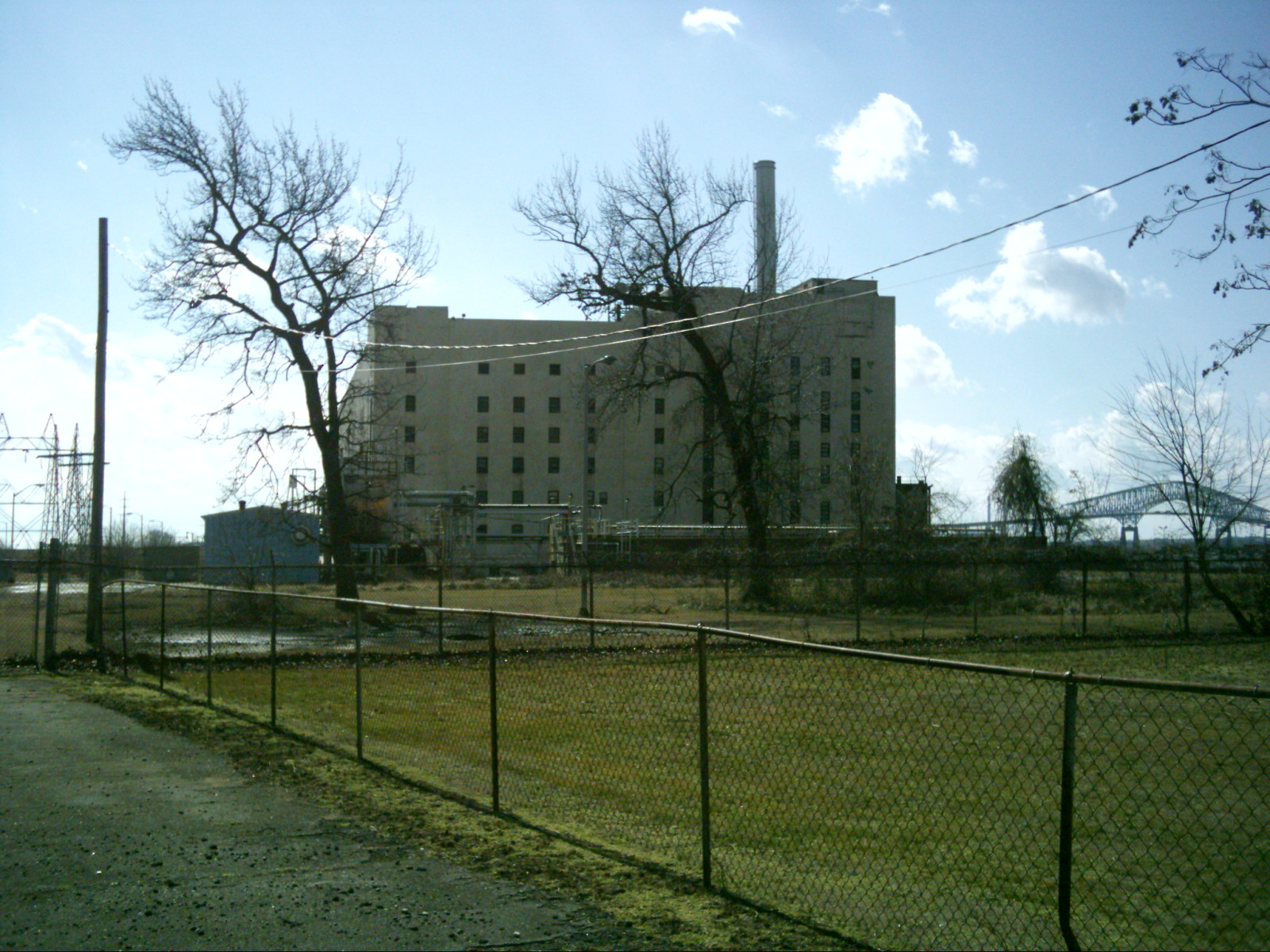
The Riverside Generating Station with the Francis Scott Key Bridge in the background right

The Riverside Generating Station is a 261 MW electric generating station operated by Exelon that is located at 4000 Broening Highway in Dundalk, Maryland. The station is on Sollers Point on the Patapsco River.

== Plant description ==
Riverside consists of Unit 4, a natural gas-fired steam electric unit with a nominal capacity of 78 MW, Unit 5, an 85 MW steam generating unit, Unit 6, a 135 MW natural gas and fuel oil-fired gas turbine, and Units 7 and 8, each 25 MW natural gas-fired gas turbines. Water from the Patapsco River is used as the heat sink of the condensers of the steam turbines.

== History ==
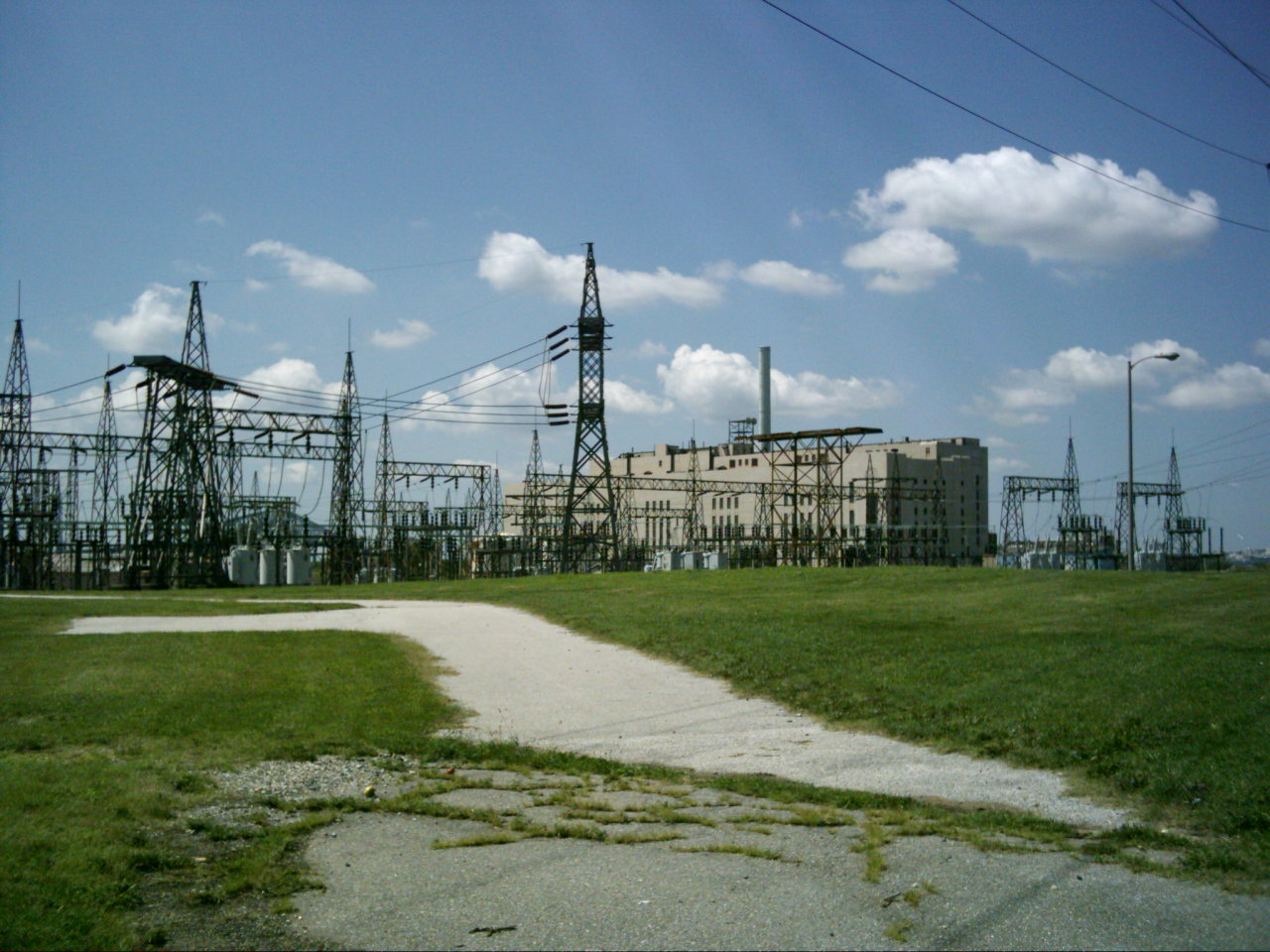
Riverside Generating Station and adjacent electrical substation.

The site of the Riverside Generating Station was originally purchased by the Consolidated Gas and Light Company of Baltimore, a predecessor company to Constellation Energy, in 1922 for the location of a manufactured gas facility that was never built. In 1942, the 60 MW steam turbine and boiler Unit 1 was installed at a cost of US$6.5 million. Two additional 60 MW steam electric units, Unit 2 and Unit 3, were placed in service in 1944 and 1948, and Units 4 and 5 entering commercial operation in 1951. Units 1, 2, 3, and 5 were shut down in 1993.

In 2008, authorization was granted to modify and reactivate Unit 5 to operate only on natural gas at an estimated cost of US$25 million. Constellation Energy merged with Exelon in 2012. Exelon announced plans to shut down Unit 4 by mid-2016.

== Operations ==
Exelon normally operates the Riverside Generating Station as a peaking power plant. As the mid-Maryland region is a summer peaking load, most of the plant's operating time will be during hot summer days. The Riverside Generating Station is dispatched by the PJM Interconnection regional transmission organization.

== See also ==
- List of power stations in Maryland
