= Waverley (Morgantown, Maryland) =

Historic house in Maryland, United States

- U.S. National Register of Historic Places
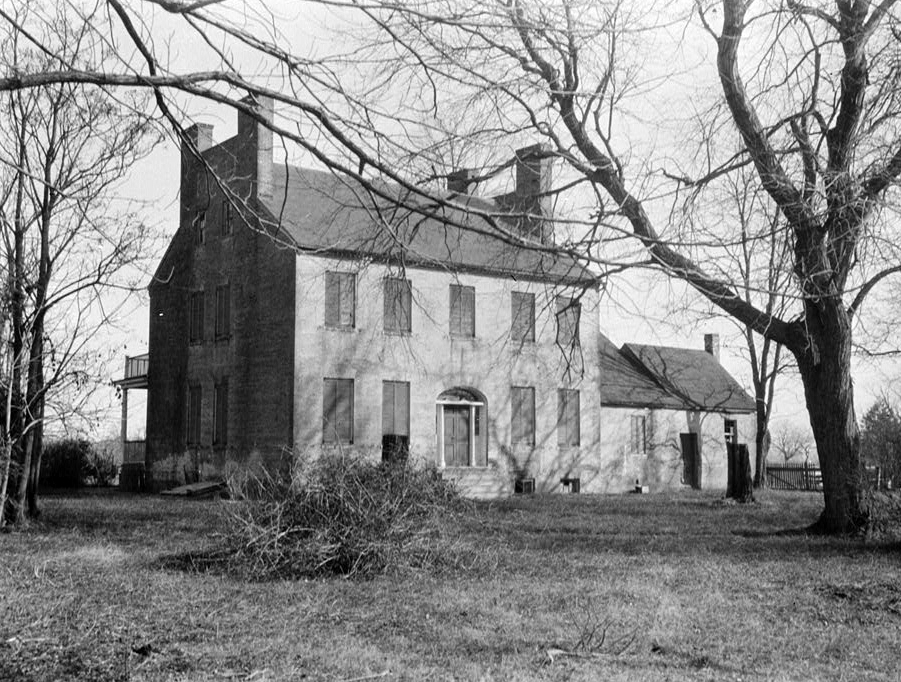
- Waverly in 1934

- Location within Maryland Location within the United States
- Location: 13535 Waverly Point Road, near Morgantown, Maryland
- Coordinates: 38°20′19″N 76°57′36″W
- Area: 136 acres (55 ha)
- Built: 1774
- Architectural style: Federal
- NRHP reference No.: 75000886
- Added to NRHP: August 11, 1975

Waverley is a historic home located near Morgantown, Charles County, Maryland. It is a large two story, five-bay, Flemish bond brick house, that faces the Potomac River. All interior woodwork is characteristic of the Federal period.

It was listed on the National Register of Historic Places in 1975.
