= Perryman Generating Station =

Power station in Maryland, USA

Coordinates: 39°26′30″N 76°13′10″W

The Perryman Generating Station is a 353 MW electric generating peaking power plant owned by Constellation Energy, located near Aberdeen, Maryland. Perryman has five units; four are oil-fired, and one is natural gas-fired.

== See also ==
- List of power stations in Maryland
