= Monocacy Site =

- U.S. National Register of Historic Places
- Nearest city: Dickerson, Maryland
- NRHP reference No.: 75000151
- Added to NRHP: July 30, 1975

The Monocacy Site is an archeological site located along the Potomac River. The site spans several eras ranging from Archaic period to the early Woodland period. Projectile points, pottery and soapstone vessels have been found here, with pottery dated to c. 1145-865 BC. The site is the deepest known stratified site in Maryland.
