= Morgantown Generating Station =

American energy generation

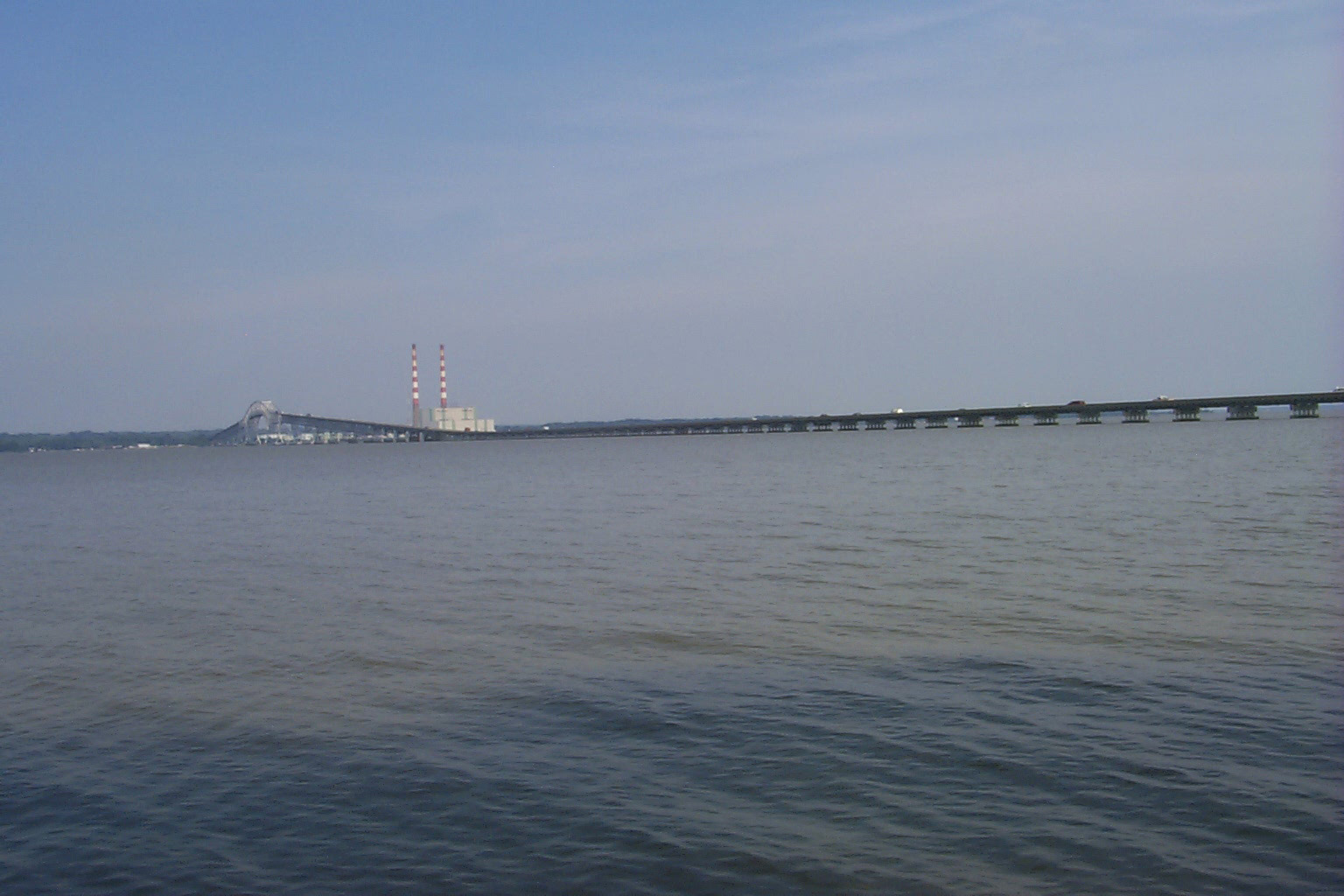
- Country: United States
- Location: Newburg, Maryland
- Coordinates: 38°21′33″N 76°58′36″W
- Status: Operational
- Commission date: 1970
- Owner: NRG Energy

Thermal power station
- Primary fuel: Coal
- Secondary fuel: Fuel oil

Power generation
- Units operational: 2 × 624 MW (base load units ) 4 × 65 MW (peaking units); 2 x 18 MW (peaking units)
- Make and model: General Electric
- Nameplate capacity: 1,477 MW

The Morgantown Generating Station is a 1,477 MW electric generating plant owned by GenOn Holdings LLC., located in the unincorporated town of Newburg, Maryland, near Morgantown, on the Potomac River. The station was built in 1970.

== Plant description ==
The facility consists of two base loaded 624 MW coal-fired steam generating units, four 65 MW oil-fired peaking combustion units, and two 18 MW black start peaking turbines. The two coal-fired units are base-loaded supercritical steam units which went into operation in 1970 and 1971. The four peaking units are General Electric Frame 7 units which went into operation in 1973, while the two black start peaking units are General Electric Frame 5 units which went into operation in 1970 and 1971.

Coal is delivered to the Morgantown generating station by CSX Transportation train using the Pope's Creek Subdivision rail line. Construction of a coal barge unloading pier on the Potomac River began in 2007.

An article in the Baltimore Sun dated December 21, 2020 stated: "A 50-year-old power plant in Charles County is the latest in Maryland to announce its plans to stop burning coal in the years to come. The coal-fired units at the Morgantown plant, which is run by GenOn Holdings, will be deactivated in 2027, the company said. The plant still will generate energy using natural gas and oil."

On June 9, 2021 GenOn revised its schedule for ending coal burning at Morgantown, stating "the retiring units at the Morgantown Generating Station are anticipated to retire as of June 1, 2022."

== History ==
All of the generating plants at the Morgantown Generating Station were built by the Potomac Electric Power Company, which sold them to the Southern Company in December 2000 as a result of the restructuring of the electricity generating industry in Maryland. The station was included in the Mirant spin-off in April 2001. Mirant was merged into GenOn Energy in 2010, and GenOn merged into NRG in 2012.

== Operations ==
The Morgantown Generating Station is dispatched by the PJM Interconnection regional transmission organization.

== Pollution ==
In August 2018, the Maryland Department of the Environment (MDE) required three generating stations across the state, including Morgantown, to meet current federal wastewater standards (effluent guidelines) by November 2020. The coal-fired units at these plants discharge arsenic and mercury to their respective receiving waters, as allowed by 1980s-era pollution standards under now-expired permits. Upgrading the plants' treatment systems to Maryland's current standards "could reduce discharges of toxic metals by 97 percent." The U.S. Environmental Protection Agency published the updated federal standards in 2015.

== Planned transition from coal ==
In December 2020, GenOn Holdings announced that the coal-fired units at the Morgantown Generating Station will be deactivated in 2027. The station will remain online generating energy using natural gas and oil.

On June 9, 2021 GenOn revised its schedule for ending coal burning at Morgantown, stating "the retiring units at the Morgantown Generating Station are anticipated to retire as of June 1, 2022." The plant is currently running on oil.

== See also ==
- List of power stations in Maryland
