= Warrior Run Generating Station =

Power plant in Maryland

- Country: United States
- Location: Allegany County, near Cumberland, Maryland
- Coordinates: 39°35′46″N 78°44′46″W
- Status: Retired
- Commission date: 2000
- Decommission date: June 1, 2024
- Owner: AES Corporation

Thermal power station
- Primary fuel: Bituminous coal
- Cogeneration?: Yes

Power generation
- Nameplate capacity: 205 MWe

External links
- Website: aes.com

Warrior Run Generating Station, owned by the AES Corporation, was a 205 megawatt cogeneration plant located south of Cumberland, Maryland, United States, at 11600 Mexico Farms Road. The plant was dispatchable from 72 to 180 MW. In addition to electric power, the plant also produced food-grade carbon dioxide.

== Design and operation ==
The plant used fluidized bed combustion (FBC) technology, in which bituminous coal and finely ground limestone are injected, using air, into the boiler. Air keeps the limestone and coal suspended in a fluid-like condition. The limestone reacts with sulfur dioxide, released during combustion of the coal, removing this pollutant from the plant's emissions. With the enhanced sulfur dioxide removal due to the FBC technology, Warrior Run burned approximately 400,000 short tons (360,000 tonnes) of coal from Maryland each year, which tends to be of a higher sulfur content. During 2007, 100 percent of the coal burned at Warrior Run was mined in Maryland.

The FBC boiler operated at a lower temperature compared to other coal-fired boiler technology, reducing production of nitrogen oxides. Injection of ammonia and a selective non-catalytic reduction system were also used to remove nitrogen oxides. A baghouse removed particulates from the plant's air emissions.

Water used by the plant was supplied by the City of Cumberland water system. Fly and bottom ash from Warrior Run, which is highly alkaline due to the limestone used by the FBC boiler, was used as fill at four nearby surface coal mines. The plant produces about 370,000 short tons (340,000 t) of ash each year.

== Warrior Run surcharge ==
Warrior Run became operational on February 10, 2000. As provided by the Public Utility Regulatory Policies Act of 1978 (PURPA), the local utility, the Potomac Edison Company, which is a unit of FirstEnergy, is required to purchase the electric output of Warrior Run at its "avoided cost" rate under a contract for thirty years. However, this "avoided cost" rate, which was determined at the time of the contract, is higher than the current wholesale price of electricity, so Potomac Edison recovers the difference in this price through a surcharge on the bills of its customers. The PURPA surcharge was scheduled to end in April 2030. In 2007 the Maryland Public Service Commission (PSC) approved a plan permitting the Warrior Run electric output to be sold into the PJM Interconnection day-ahead wholesale market and the capacity bid into the PJM forward capacity market, with the proceeds used to reduce the surcharge. In 2023, the PSC approved a Termination Agreement in which the obligation to purchase power would end on June 30, 2024, in exchange for a reduced 78-month PURPA surcharge payment totaling $357 million.

== Retirement ==
In 2023, AES Corporation announced its intent to retire this coal plant in June 2024 This is seen as boost to Maryland's 2007 joining of Regional Greenhouse Gas Initiative (RGGI) to reduce greenhouse gas emissions. However, in a 2025 filing with the Federal Energy Regulatory Commission, AES stated that, due to the need for electric capacity in PJM to support load growth driven by data centers, artificial intelligence, and other factors, it has reevaluated the economic viability of Warrior Run and was planning to avoid the permanent deactivation of the plant and restore its operational status.

In June 2026, President Donald Trump invoked the Defense Production Act of 1950 to spend $85 million in federal funds to restart the Warrior Run coal plant.

== See also ==
- List of power stations in Maryland
