= Rock Springs Generation Facility =

Power station in Maryland, USA

Coordinates: 39°43′11″N 76°09′34″W

The Rock Springs Generation Facility is a 684 MW natural gas-fired electric generating peaking plant located in Rising Sun, Maryland. The plant comprises four gas turbines and went online in 2003. The plant was originally co-owned by Old Dominion Electric Cooperative and Consolidated Edison, and was sold to AllCapital and Industry Funds Management in 2007. The Carlyle Group, an asset management company, acquired the plant in 2016.

== See also ==
- List of power stations in Maryland
