= R. Paul Smith Power Station =

Former electric generating plant

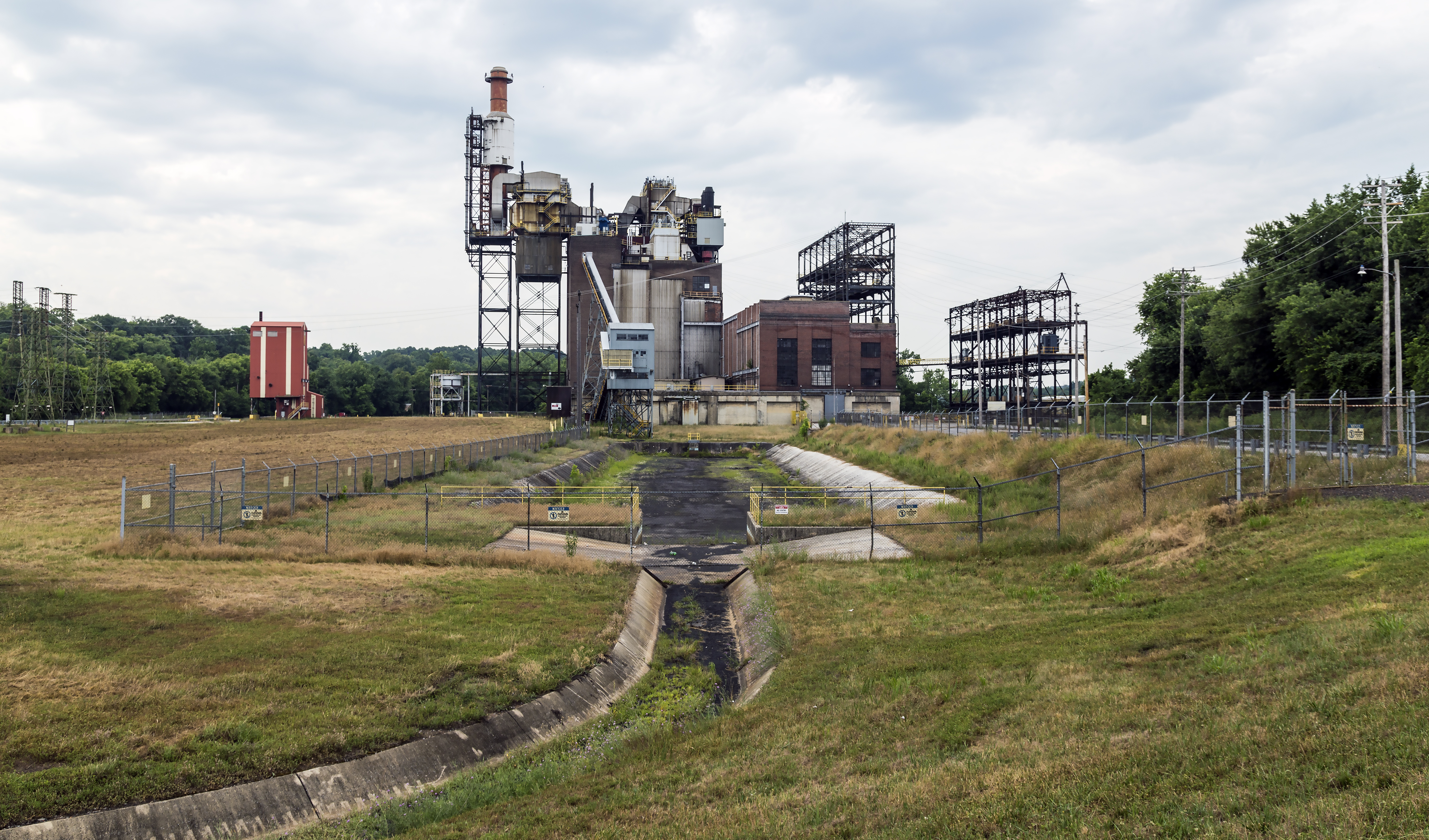
- R. Paul Smith Power Station in 2014
- Country: United States
- Location: Williamsport, Maryland
- Coordinates: 39.595278°N 77.827222°W
- Status: Decommissioned
- Construction began: 1922
- Commission date: 1927; 1947; 1958
- Decommission date: 2012
- Owner: FirstEnergy

Thermal power station
- Primary fuel: Bituminous coal
- Secondary fuel: Fuel oil

Power generation
- Nameplate capacity: 116 MW

The R. Paul Smith Power Station is a closed electric generating plant owned by FirstEnergy (formerly Allegheny Energy) in Williamsport, Maryland.

== Description ==
The facility consists of 2 coal-fired steam generating units generating a total capacity of 116 MW. The units can use fuel oil as an alternate energy source. Condenser cooling for these units is accomplished with once-through cooling water from the Potomac River.

The plant is located on land in between the Potomac River and the Chesapeake and Ohio Canal, north of Lock 44 of the canal. Coal was delivered to the plant originally by rail until the mid-1950s, and intermittently by rail and trucks until late 1974 when all coal deliveries were diverted to trucks. Coal ash from the plant was disposed at ash ponds in West Virginia, across the river from the plant.

The plant is subject to the federal Clean Air Act. Because of the age of the power plant units, and the need to maintain the plant's capabilities to ensure reliability of the regional power grid, the Maryland Department of the Environment (MDE) had exempted the plant from compliance with a state law, the Healthy Air Act, which sets stringent air pollution limits for sulfur oxide and NOx. However, FirstEnergy decided to cease plant operations in 2012, and in 2013 MDE proposed reinstating the stringent state emission requirements, in case the plant resumes operations in the future.

== History ==
Construction of the first power plant at Williamsport began in 1922 by the Potomac Public Service Company. In 1923, the company became part of the Potomac Edison Company. In 1925, Potomac Edison joined West Penn Electric Company. The first generating unit began service in 1927. Coal was delivered to the plant by the Western Maryland Railway. The plant was named for R. Paul Smith, the company's first president.

The 1927 unit was replaced by a new unit in 1947 with a nameplate capacity of 34.5 MW. An additional 75 MW operating unit was constructed in 1958. In 1960 the West Penn Electric Company was renamed Allegheny Power System, Inc. Circa 1970 the plant began to receive coal deliveries by truck, and rail deliveries ended.

On January 26, 2012 parent company FirstEnergy announced that the station would be closed due to the cost of retrofitting the plant to comply with environmental regulations due to take effect in 2015. The R. Paul Smith station was one of six FirstEnergy stations to be retired in 2012. In its last years the plant was operated intermittently. FirstEnergy ceased plant operations on September 1, 2012.

== See also ==
- List of power stations in Maryland
