= Gould Street Generating Station =

Former electric generating plant in Baltimore, Maryland, US

Coordinates: 39°15′59″N 76°36′14.5″W

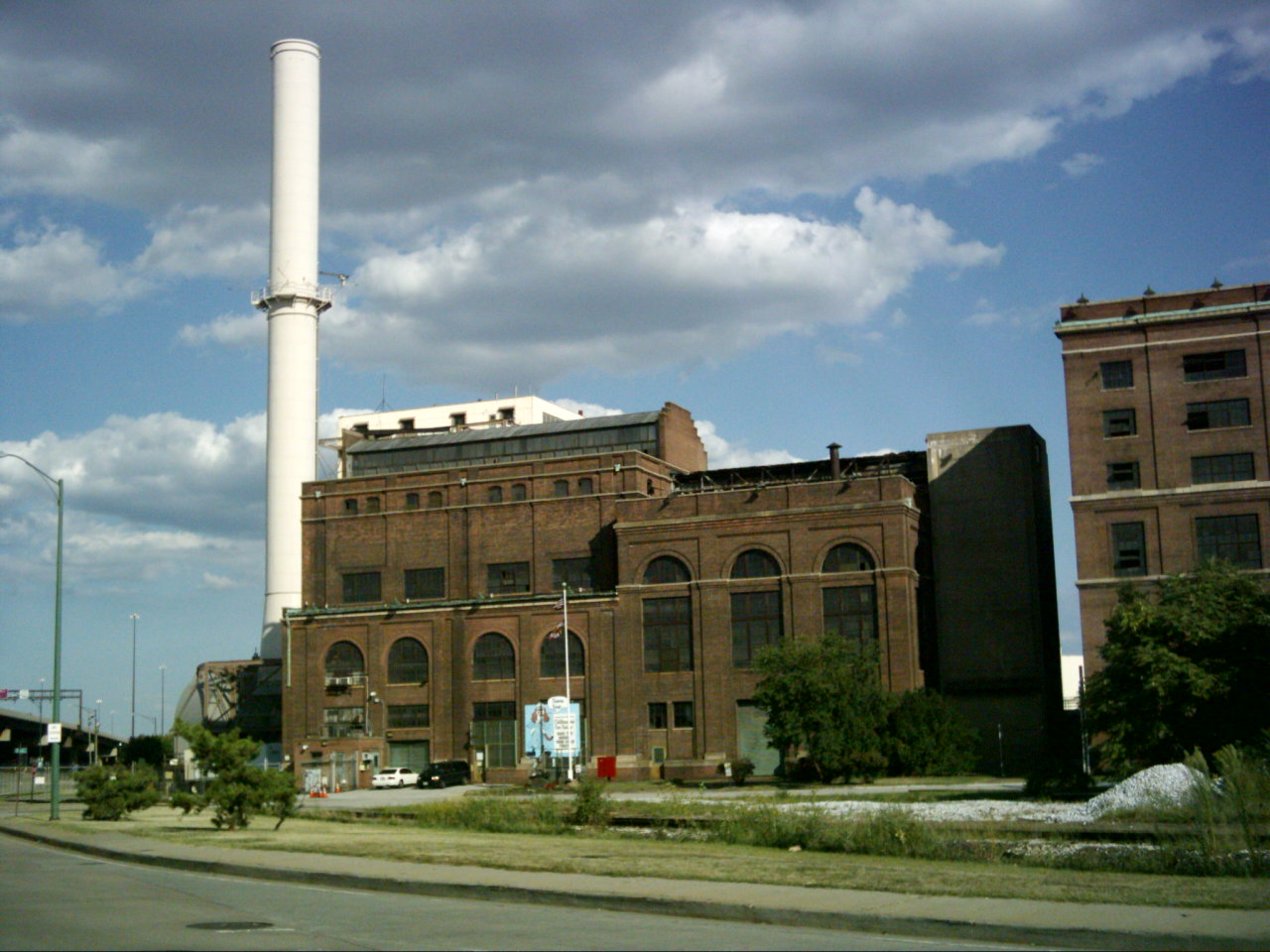
The Gould Street Generating Station in Baltimore

The Gould Street Generating Station was a former 100 MW electric generating plant operated by Exelon that was located on Gould Street in south Baltimore, Maryland, USA. The plant was adjacent to an elevated section of freeway I-95 and was south of the Riverside neighborhood and west of the Locust Point neighborhood of Baltimore. The plant site, located on the shore of the Middle Branch of the Patapsco River, was used for the generation of electric power for over one hundred years before being shut down on June 1, 2019. The site was purchased by Greenspring Realty Partners, Inc. for $3.1 million in December 2019. Demolition began in October 2020. The original brick buildings, the large storage tanks behind them, and other minor structures on the southwest portion of the property were demolished as of March 2021, but as of April 2022 the larger steel building to the northeast on the property remains. A large portion of the property was acquired by Weller Development in July 2021 and the future of the remaining structure and the property is not known.

== Plant description ==
Electric output from the Gould Street Generating Station was provided by Unit 3, which consists of a natural gas-fired boiler and steam turbine. Water from the Patapsco River was used as the heat sink of the condenser for the steam turbine. The plant also had a 250 kW emergency generator for use during power outages to provide black start power to start Unit 3.

== History ==
The plant site was first used to generate electricity in 1905, when the Baltimore Electric Power Company installed three 2 MW, 60 cycle, 6,600 volt generators driven by steam turbines. The electricity was then converted to direct current by motor-generator sets at an electrical substation on Sharp Street, where it was sold to customers at prices below that being offered by its competitor in the city, the Consolidated Gas Electric Light and Power Company (a predecessor company of Constellation Energy). The resulting price war resulted in destructive competition, with electricity being sold at prices lower than its cost of production. The situation was solved in 1907 by the acquisition of the assets of the Baltimore Electric Company under a 999-year lease by Consolidated Gas. The turbines and generators at the plant, not being necessary to serve the electric load at that time, were then sold and shipped to a silver mining company in Mexico.

Two replacement steam-powered 35 MW generators numbered as Units 1 and 2 were installed in a new building at the site in 1927. A boiler which burned pulverized coal provided 450 psi steam for the turbines that was superheated to 750 °F (399 °C). These two generators operated until they were decommissioned in 1977.

The 100 MW generator of Unit 3, installed in 1952, was originally powered by a turbine with steam provided from a coal-fired boiler, but was later converted from coal to burn No. 6 fuel oil and natural gas. This unit was shut down in 2003 due to an equipment failure involving the steam turbine. Constellation Energy repaired the turbine, modified Unit 3 to burn natural gas only, and reactivated the plant in June 2008. Constellation merged into Exelon in 2012. Exelon shuttered and sold the plant in 2019.

== Operations ==
Before the plant was closed, Exelon operated it as a peaking power plant with a capacity factor of up to 10%. As the mid-Maryland region is a summer peaking load, the majority of the plant's operating time was during hot summer days. The Gould Street Generating Station was dispatched by the PJM Interconnection regional transmission organization.

== See also ==
- List of power stations in Maryland
