= Eagle Harbor, Maryland =

- Town
- Seal

- Location of Eagle Harbor, Maryland
- Coordinates: 38°34′0″N 76°41′13″W
- Country: United States
- State: Maryland
- County: Prince George's
- Incorporated: 1929

Area
  - Total: 0.12 sq mi (0.32 km^{2})
  - Land: 0.12 sq mi (0.32 km^{2})
  - Water: 0 sq mi (0.00 km^{2})
- Elevation: 13 ft (4 m)

Population (2020)
  - Total: 67
  - Density: 548/sq mi (211.7/km^{2})
- Time zone: UTC-5 (Eastern (EST))
  - Summer (DST): UTC-4 (EDT)
- ZIP code: 20608
- Area codes: 301, 240
- FIPS code: 24-24200
- GNIS feature ID: 0597360
- Website: www.townofeagleharborincmd.org

Eagle Harbor is an incorporated town in the far southeast corner of Prince George's County, Maryland, United States, and near the rural community of Aquasco that is known as a historic African American community founded in 1925. Per the 2020 census, the population was 67. The Chalk Point Generating Station, owned by NRG Energy, which was sold to Mirant by the Potomac Electric Power Company (PEPCO) in 2000, is located adjacent to the town.

== Geography ==
Eagle Harbor is located at 38°34′0″N 76°41′13″W (38.566709, -76.686841).

According to the United States Census Bureau, the town has a total area of 0.12 square miles (0.31 km^{2}), all land.

=== Climate ===
The climate in this area is characterized by hot, humid summers and generally mild to cool winters. According to the Köppen Climate Classification system, Eagle Harbor has a humid subtropical climate, abbreviated "Cfa" on climate maps.

== History ==
Eagle Harbor was originally known as Trueman Point, a river port established in the early 18th century to serve as a shipping point for tobacco plantations located in the Aquasco area. In 1747, it was considered by the Maryland colony as an official tobacco inspection station, but it never realized that designation. In 1817, George Weems established the Weems Steamboat Company, connecting Trueman Point to other landings along the Patuxent River. He also built a tobacco warehouse, and ships routinely stopped at Trueman Landing. The steamboat traffic continued into the 1930s. Trueman Point Landing is a local historic site identified by the Maryland-National Capital Park and Planning Commission.

Located just 30 miles (48 km) from Washington, D.C., in 1925, developer Walter L. Bean purchased land adjoining Trueman Point with the vision of creating a resort community for middle-class African Americans from the area. Lots were offered for $50.00 or less, and the community was advertised as "a high class summer colony for the better people." After a number of summer cottages were constructed, the community incorporated as the town of Eagle Harbor in 1929.

== Demographics ==
Historical population
Census	Pop.	Note	%±
1930	3		—
1940	2		−33.3%
1950	7		250.0%
1960	15		114.3%
1970	14		−6.7%
1980	45		221.4%
1990	38		−15.6%
2000	55		44.7%
2010	63		14.5%
2020	67		6.3%
U.S. Decennial Census; 2010 2020

=== 2020 census ===
Eagle Harbor town, Maryland – Racial and ethnic composition Note: the US Census treats Hispanic/Latino as an ethnic category. This table excludes Latinos from the racial categories and assigns them to a separate category. Hispanics/Latinos may be of any race.
Race / Ethnicity (NH = Non-Hispanic)	Pop 2000	Pop 2010	Pop 2020	% 2000	% 2010	% 2020
White alone (NH)	17	5	19	30.91%	7.94%	28.36%
Black or African American alone (NH)	36	58	35	65.45%	92.06%	52.24%
Native American or Alaska Native alone (NH)	1	0	0	1.82%	0.00%	0.00%
Asian alone (NH)	0	0	0	0.00%	0.00%	0.00%
Native Hawaiian or Pacific Islander alone (NH)	0	0	0	0.00%	0.00%	0.00%
Other race alone (NH)	0	0	1	0.00%	0.00%	1.49%
Mixed race or Multiracial (NH)	1	0	8	1.82%	0.00%	11.94%
Hispanic or Latino (any race)	0	0	4	0.00%	0.00%	5.97%
Total	55	63	67	100.00%	100.00%	100.00%

=== 2010 census ===
As of the census of 2010, there were 63 people, 22 households, and 16 families living in the town. The population density was 525.0 inhabitants per square mile (202.7/km^{2}). There were 58 housing units at an average density of 483.3 per square mile (186.6/km^{2}). The racial makeup of the town was 7.9% White and 92.1% African American.

There were 22 households, of which 27.3% had children under the age of 18 living with them, 50.0% were married couples living together, 22.7% had a female householder with no husband present, and 27.3% were non-families. 13.6% of all households were made up of individuals. The average household size was 2.86 and the average family size was 3.38.

The median age in the town was 47.8 years. 28.6% of residents were under the age of 18; 1.6% were between the ages of 18 and 24; 14.3% were from 25 to 44; 39.6% were from 45 to 64; and 15.9% were 65 years of age or older. The gender makeup of the town was 50.8% male and 49.2% female.

=== 2000 census ===
As of the census of 2000, there were 55 people, 24 households, and 15 families living in the town. The population density was 474.9 inhabitants per square mile (183.4/km^{2}). There were 56 housing units at an average density of 483.5 per square mile (186.7/km^{2}). The racial makeup of the town was 30.91% White, 65.45% African American, 1.82% Native American, and 1.82% from two or more races.

There were 24 households, out of which 16.7% had children under the age of 18 living with them, 29.2% were married couples living together, 29.2% had a female householder with no husband present, and 37.5% were non-families. 37.5% of all households were made up of individuals, and 20.8% had someone living alone who was 65 years of age or older. The average household size was 2.29 and the average family size was 3.00.

In the town, the population was spread out, with 21.8% under the age of 18, 5.5% from 18 to 24, 20.0% from 25 to 44, 36.4% from 45 to 64, and 16.4% who were 65 years of age or older. The median age was 46 years. For every 100 females, there were 89.7 males. For every 100 females age 18 and over, there were 79.2 males.

The median income for a household in the town was $58,750, and the median income for a family was $65,625. Males had a median income of $80,138 versus $20,417 for females. The per capita income for the town was $16,255. There were 15.4% of families and 22.4% of the population living below the poverty line, including 56.3% of under eighteens and none of those over 64.

== Government ==
Prince George's County Police Department District 5 Station in Clinton CDP serves the community.

== Transportation ==
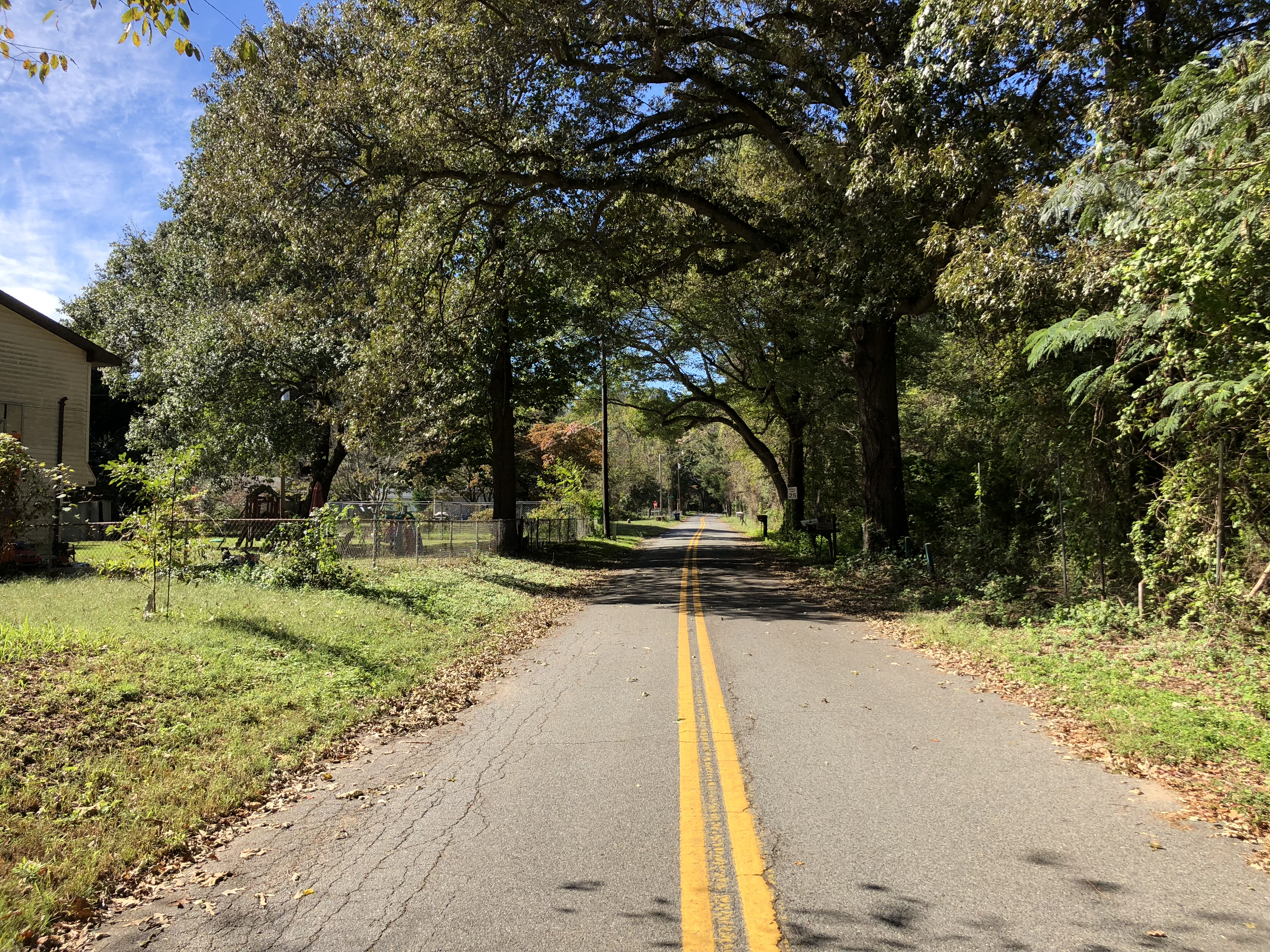
Trueman Point Road, the largest road in Eagle Harbor

The only method of transportation to Eagle Point is by road. No state highways serve the town. The main road within Eagle Harbor is Trueman Point Road. Ending at Trueman Point along the Patuxent River, it extends southwest, becoming Eagle Harbor Road, and connects with Maryland Route 381.

== Education ==
Residents who live in Eagle Harbor are zoned to Prince George's County Public Schools:

- Baden Elementary School
- Gwynn Park Middle School
- Gwynn Park High School
