= GenOn Energy Holdings =

Defunct American energy company

- Formerly: Mirant Corporation
- Type: Subsidiary
- Industry: Electric utility
- Predecessor: Southern Company
- Founded: April 2, 2001; 25 years ago
- Defunct: December 2012; 13 years ago
- Fate: Acquired by NRG Energy
- Successor: NRG Energy
- Parent: GenOn Energy

GenOn Energy Holdings, formerly Mirant Corporation, was a subsidiary of GenOn Energy, and is now a part of NRG Energy.

The company was spun off from its former parent, Southern Company, on April 2, 2001. The company was merged into GenOn Energy on 3 December 2010. The company then became part of NRG Energy in December 2012.

Mirant operated 13 plants in the states of California, Georgia, Maine, Maryland, Massachusetts, Michigan, New York, and Virginia and has the capacity to generate approximately 10,300 MW of electricity.

== History ==
=== Southern beginnings and spinoff ===
Mirant began its corporate existence in 1981 as Southern Electric International (SEI), a small consulting division of Southern Company that provided engineering and technical services to industrial companies, domestic and international utilities. With the Energy Policy Act of 1992 deregulation arrived in the US electric power sector, and SEI ventured into global markets with the acquisition of a 50% stake in Freeport Power, a Bahamian utility. In the years to come, other acquisitions followed, notably the acquisition of a British distribution utility - South Western Electricity Board later renamed SWEB (now known as Western Power Distribution); a controlling interest in Hong Kong based Consolidated Electric Power Asia (CEPA), a stake in a German utility BEWAG, controlling interest in Empresa Electrica del Norte Grande, S. A. (EDELNOR) in Chile, and a hydroelectric generating facility in Argentina known as Hydroelectrica Alicura; giving it worldwide business interests in the Caribbean, Asian, South American and European energy markets. On the domestic front the company forged a joint venture in 1999 with Houston-based Vastar Energy to create Southern Company Energy Marketing, an electricity and gas trading company. That same year the company also acquired power generation facilities in New England (Canal station, Martha's Vineyard Diesels, Kendall Station), New York (Lovett and Bowline stations), California (Pittsburg, Potrero and Contra Costa stations). That same year SEI was renamed Southern Energy, in keeping with the broader theme of the products and markets that it pursued. Soon afterwards, its biggest domestic acquisition to date came in December 2000 with the purchase of the Morgantown, Chalk Point, Dickerson and Potomac River power generating assets from Potomac Electric Power Company (PEPCO). After an initial public offering of Southern Energy common stock in the fall of 2000, parent Southern Company completely spun off its interests in Southern Energy in April 2001 and a new publicly listed entity named Mirant Corporation began trading on the New York Stock exchange with the ticker symbol MIR. Between 2000 and 2003, the company continued its expansion in the U.S. markets with the acquisition or greenfield development of various gas-fired power plants in markets like Nevada, Texas, Wisconsin, Indiana, Arkansas, Louisiana, Georgia and Florida.

=== 2003 bankruptcy ===
Following the disruption to the independent power industry precipitated by the bankruptcy of Enron, on July 14, 2003, after months of attempting to restructure its debt, the company sought Chapter 11 bankruptcy protection.

The Mirant bankruptcy proceedings were unusual in that the court agreed to the appointment of a committee of equity holders. The usual reasoning is that if there is any positive equity in a company, the company should not be in Chapter 11—and if there isn't, there is no reason for a committee of people without such an interest. But the judge did find it sufficiently likely in Mirant that there would be equity interest after re-organization to create such a committee.

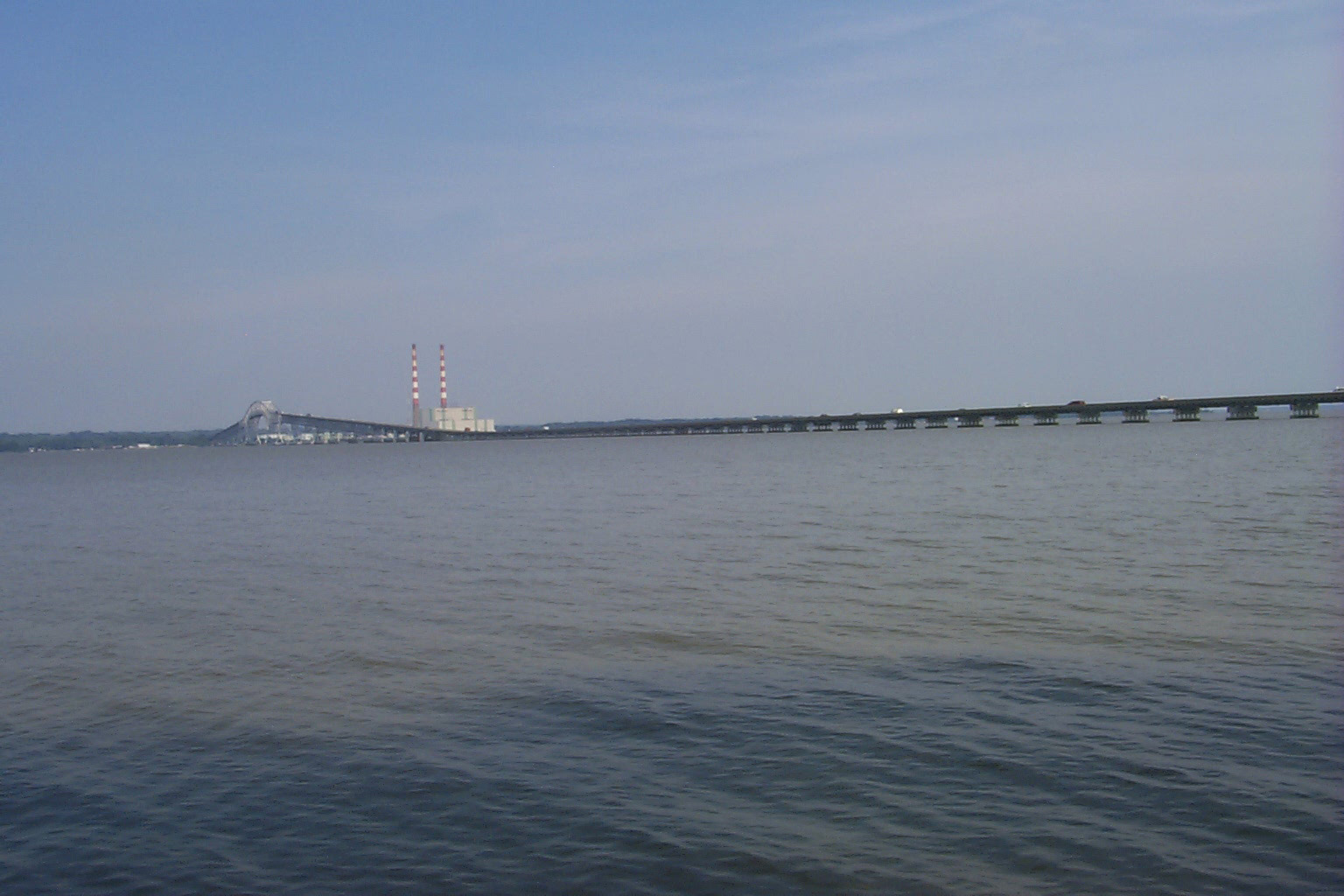
Mirant's Morgantown Generating Station and the Governor Harry W. Nice Memorial Bridge

In January 2006, Mirant emerged from bankruptcy and the company was relisted to the New York Stock Exchange under the symbol MIR. The equity holders from the pre-bankruptcy Mirant did retain a portion of the equity of the re-organized entity.

Prior to the bankruptcy filing, Mirant had attempted to expand the Potrero plant, but neighborhood and community activists fought the proposal for five years and on March 2, 2006, the California Public Utilities Commission announced its rejection of Mirant's expansion plans. The plant was scheduled to be shut down sometime in 2007 in preparation for constructing a more modern replacement, but subsequently plans were scaled back and now call for the existing plant to simply be upgraded.

In 2007, Mirant sold some gas-fired generating plants and its overseas power plants in the Philippines and in the Caribbean.

=== 2010 Merger ===
On Sunday, April 11, 2010 Mirant announced it was merging with RRI Energy, a company formerly known as Reliant Energy. The merger, which was completed on December 3, 2010, resulted in a company known as GenOn Energy.

== Operations ==
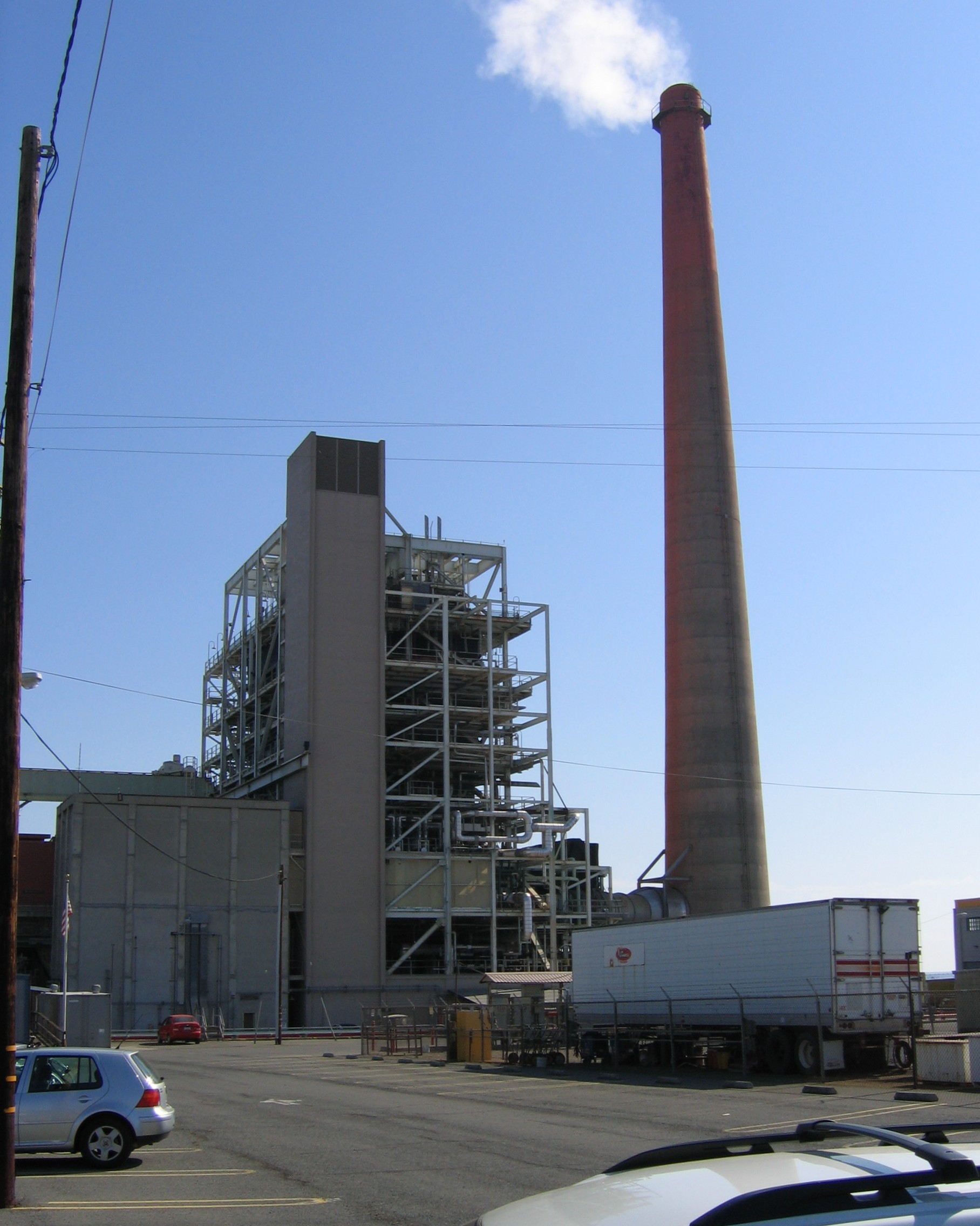
Unit 3 of Mirant's Potrero Generating Station in San Francisco.

- Mirant's Morgantown Generating Station, located near the unincorporated town of Morgantown, Maryland, was ranked as the best coal-fired plant in terms of heat-rate efficiency in the United States in Electric Power & Light magazine's 2004 survey of power plants.
- The Dickerson Generating Station, located near Dickerson, Maryland, and other Mirant Mid-Atlantic sites are Wildlife Habitat Council (WHC) certified and have received national recognition for their contributions to wildlife habitat conservation. Efforts include providing artificial nesting structures and planting native trees, shrubs, and aquatic plants.
- In 2004, Mirant's Canal generating plant (Sandwich, Massachusetts) became the first power plant in Massachusetts to reduce emissions as part of a new state effort to achieve the nation's toughest air emission standards for steam-electric plants.
- The Potrero Generating Station in San Francisco is among the oldest electrical power facilities in California and located at the site of the first power station run by the company that eventually became Pacific Gas and Electric. It is now shut down.

== Controversy ==
=== Environmental record ===
Researchers at the University of Massachusetts Amherst identified Mirant as the 63rd-largest corporate producer of Air pollution in the United States, based on 2002 data, with roughly 19 million pounds of toxic chemicals released annually into the air. Major pollutants indicated by the study include sulfuric acid, hydrochloric acid, and chromium compounds.

=== Chesapeake Climate Action Network blockade of Dickerson Power Plant ===
On November 10, 2004, a group of Chesapeake Climate Action Network activists, students, farmers, and religious officials held a protest against the coal-fired Dickerson Power Plant in Montgomery County, Maryland. During the protest, six people were arrested for trespassing on private property. The protestors called on the plant's owner, the Mirant Corporation, to stop opposing state and federal legislation against power plant pollution.

=== Tax issues ===
Mirant, which owns and operates two power plants in the Hudson Valley Region of New York State, failed to pay its property taxes in a dispute with tax authorities, claiming over-assessments by the Towns of Stony Point and Haverstraw New York, as well as the North Rockland School District. Under the terms of bankruptcy, Mirant held payment in excess of $180 million due this last several years while a settlement could be reached. This case, which has caused local residents to themselves file bankruptcy, cost the average taxpayer over $2000 in increased property taxes.

The higher than average assessments paid to the local municipalities were part of a strategy used by the Consolidated Edison and Orange and Rockland Utilities, whose plants Mirant assumed after deregulation, to site their plants in the Hudson River Valley Area.

Following proceedings in state court, a settlement was reached between Mirant and the towns in December 2006, with taxes based on lower assessed values of the two power plants.

== Federal Court Cases ==
Local 369 of the Utility Workers Union of America (UWUA) recently succeeded in enforcing an arbitration award in the United States District Court for the District of Massachusetts. The court determined that Mirant did not have just cause to discharge two workers for viewing pornographic materials on a computer. Federal Judge Douglas P. Woodlock denied Mirant’s motion to vacate the award, and the union’s motion for judgment was granted.
