= Vienna Generating Station =

Power station in Maryland, USA

Coordinates: 38°29′15″N 75°49′19″W

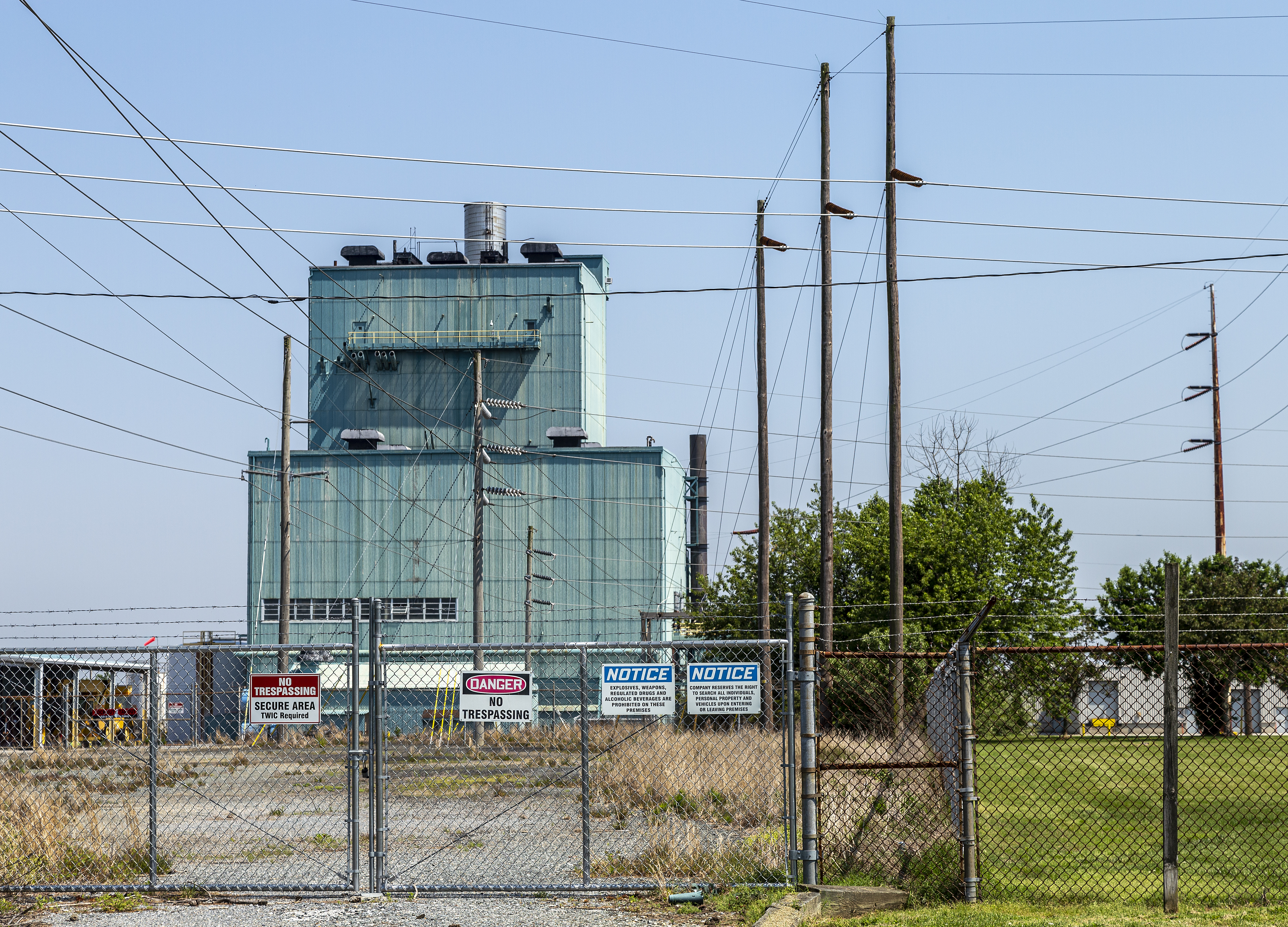
Vienna Generating Station in 2019

The Vienna Generating Station is a 167 MW oil-fired electric generating plant owned by NRG Energy, located in Vienna, Maryland.

The generating station is a peaking facility, that operates less than 2% of the year to supplement generation during times of high demand.

== See also ==
- List of power stations in Maryland
