= Morgantown, Maryland =

Unincorporated community in Maryland, United States

- Unincorporated community
- Location within the state of Maryland Morgantown (the United States)
- Coordinates: 38°20′43″N 76°58′16″W
- Country: United States
- State: Maryland
- County: Charles
- Time zone: UTC-5 (Eastern (EST))
  - Summer (DST): UTC-4 (EDT)
- GNIS feature ID: 590827

Morgantown is an unincorporated community in Charles County, Maryland, United States. It lies south of the Governor Harry W. Nice Memorial Bridge on the Potomac River at Lower Cedar Point. Morgantown is known for the Mirant Morgantown Generating Station smokestacks. The community had ferryboat service to Potomac Beach in Virginia before the present bridge opened in 1940. Waverley was listed on the National Register of Historic Places in 1975. In 2007, a controversial coal barge loading facility was under construction at the power plant on Popes Creek.
