= Constellation Energy =

American energy company

Constellation Energy Corporation
- Type: Public
- Traded as: Nasdaq: CEG; Nasdaq-100 component; S&P 500 component
- Industry: Energy
- Founded: 1999; 27 years ago (spun off from Exelon in 2022)
- Headquarters: Baltimore, Maryland, U.S.
- Key people: Joseph Dominguez (president and CEO)
- Products: Electric power; Natural gas
- Revenue: ▲US$25.5 billion (2025)
- Operating income: ▼US$3.09 billion (2025)
- Net income: ▼US$2.32 billion (2025)
- Total assets: ▲US$57.2 billion (2025)
- Total equity: ▲US$14.5 billion (2025)
- Number of employees: 15,339 (2025)
- Website: constellationenergy.com

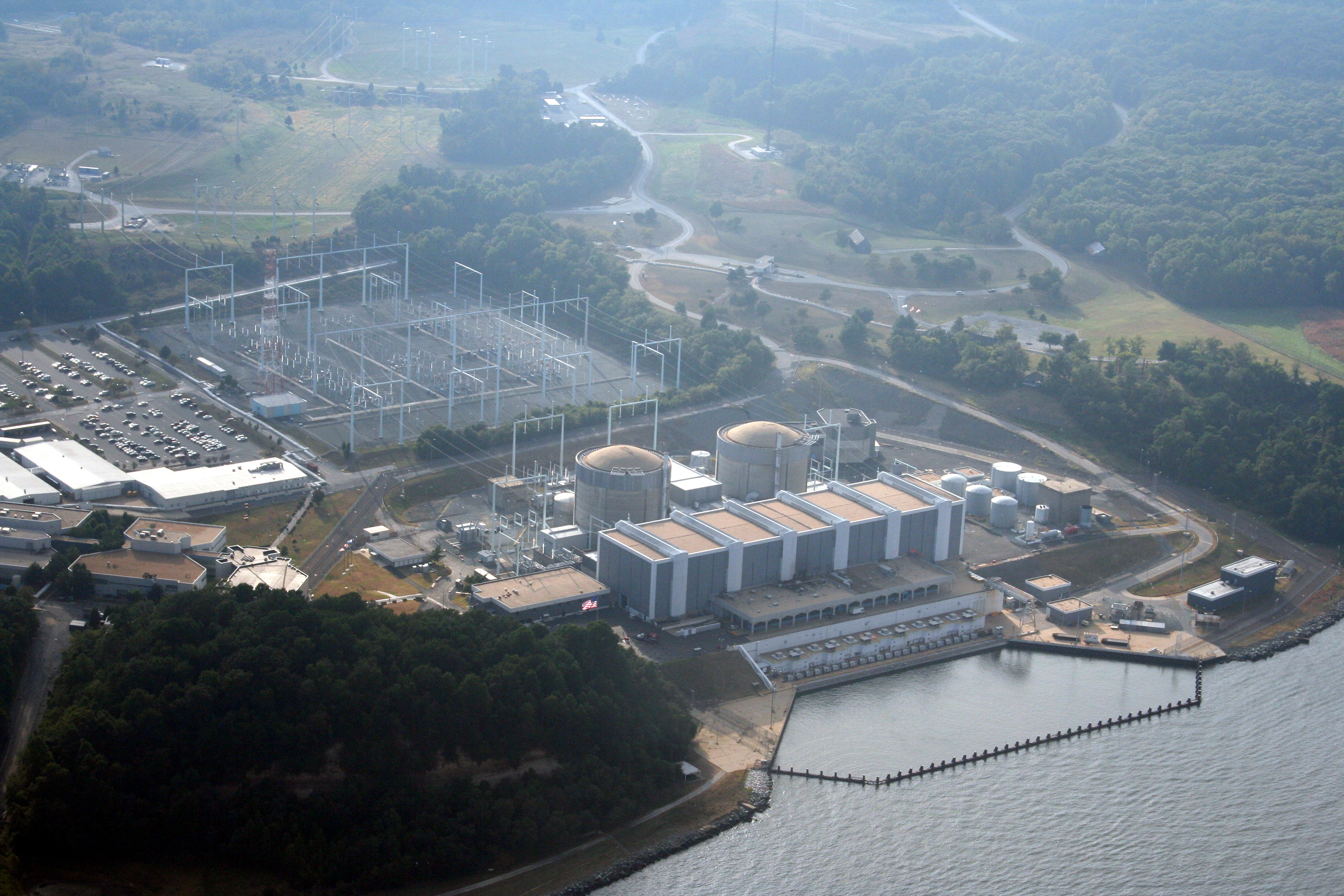
Calvert Cliffs Nuclear Power Plant in Calvert County's Lusby, Maryland

Constellation Energy Corporation is an American energy company headquartered in Baltimore, Maryland. The company provides electric power, natural gas, and energy management services. It has approximately two million customers across the continental United States.

The company was known as Constellation Energy Group (former NYSE ticker symbol CEG), a Fortune 500 company and one of the largest electricity producers in the United States, until a merger with Exelon in 2012. When FERC approved the acquisition, Constellation Energy's energy supply business was re-branded as Constellation, an Exelon company. As part of the 2012 merger, Baltimore Gas and Electric, the regulated utility operated by Constellation Energy, became a regulated utility operating under Exelon Utilities. The current iteration of the company was founded in 2022 after splitting off from Exelon.

Before merging with Exelon, Constellation Energy Group operated more than 35 power plants in 11 states (mainly Maryland, Pennsylvania, New York, West Virginia, and California). Baltimore Gas and Electric created Constellation as a holding company in 1999.

== History ==
On September 15, 2005, Constellation Energy announced a joint venture, UniStar Nuclear, with Areva to market the European Pressurized Reactor (EPR) in the United States. On December 19, 2005, FPL Group, Inc. announced the acquisition of Constellation Energy in a merger transaction valued at more than $11 billion, as well as the fact that it would adopt Constellation Energy as its name for the post-merger entity. The merger was canceled on October 25, 2006.

In July 2008, Constellation Energy bought uranium trading firm Nufcor International from AngloGold Ashanti and FirstRand International.

On September 15, 2008, after reports that Constellation had exposure to Lehman Brothers following that firm's bankruptcy filing, Constellation's stock price dropped 56% in a single day. The massive drop led the New York Stock Exchange to halt trading in Constellation. The next day, as the stock fell as low as $13 a share, the company announced it was hiring Morgan Stanley and UBS to advise it on "strategic alternatives" suggesting a buyout. On September 17, 2008, Constellation accepted an offer of $4.7 billion by MidAmerican Energy, a subsidiary of Berkshire Hathaway, but ultimately canceled the deal on December 17, 2008, in favor of a $4.5 billion buyout from French power company Electricite de France (EDF).

In January 2009, Constellation Energy announced it would sell the majority of its London-based international commodities business to an affiliate of Goldman Sachs for an undisclosed price.

In April 2010, Constellation Energy closed its agreement with Clipper Windpower to acquire the Criterion Wind Project in Garrett County, Maryland, and to purchase 28 Clipper Liberty 2.5-MW wind turbines for the project. Construction was completed in December 2010. In May 2010, the firm acquired two natural gas combined-cycle generation facilities in Texas from Houston-based Navasota Holdings. The $365 million transaction included the Colorado Bend Energy Center, a 550-MW facility near Wharton, Texas, and Quail Run Energy Center, a 550-MW facility near Odessa, Texas. The purchase added 1,100 MW of capacity.

On April 28, 2011, Exelon announced its intention to purchase Constellation Energy. The merger was completed on March 12, 2012.

On May 27, 2011, Constellation Energy announced its intention to purchase StarTex Power, a retail electricity provider in Houston, Texas; the purchase was completed on June 1, 2011. In 2018, the StarTex brand was discontinued; Constellation served its existing customers instead. In May 2011, the company acquired MXenergy, a residential and small business energy provider with approximately half a million customers. In December 2011, it announced the acquisition of ONEOK Energy Marketing Co., a natural gas company with customers in the Midwest. In 2011, it contracted to construct and operate for the Toys-R-Us distribution center in Flanders, New Jersey, what was then the largest rooftop solar array ever constructed.

In March 2014, it agreed to acquire ETC ProLiance Energy, a supplier of natural gas to customers in several states. In November 2014, it completed its acquisition of Integrys Energy Services, a competitive retail electricity and natural gas subsidiary serving customers in 22 states. In September 2016, it completed its acquisition of the retail electricity and natural gas business from ConEdison Solutions, a subsidiary of Consolidated Edison, Inc. In the purchase, Constellation acquired ConEdison's retail electricity and natural gas customer contracts and associated supply contracts serving approximately 15 TWh of electricity and 1 billion cubic feet per annum (28,000,000 m^{3}/a) of natural gas to more than 560,000 commercial, industrial, public sector and residential customers.

In August 2018, it began constructing a 10-megawatt solar array outside of Ocean City, Maryland. The array will provide the city with approximately 20% of its annual energy usage when completed. In October 2018, Constellation and the Tucson Unified School District completed a project that added solar generation capability to 82 of the district's buildings and facilities. The project is estimated to meet 47% of the district's electricity needs.

In 2022, it became an independent company after Exelon split its utilities and power generation businesses. Former subsidiary Baltimore Gas & Electric remained part of Exelon.

In September 2024 Microsoft entered a contract with the company that will restart the undamaged nuclear reactor at the Three Mile Island plant. In November 2025, the Trump administration said it would give Constellation Energy a $1 billion federal loan for the project. The company is also planning to upgrade other existing reactor plants to provide more power.

In January 2025, Constellation agreed to acquire the natural gas and geothermal power provider Calpine for $16.4 billion ($26.6bn including debt) in a cash-and-stock deal. The deal closed in January 2026 after receiving approval by state and federal regulators. The following month Constellation, via Calpine, entered a long term power supply agreement with data center operator CyrusOne to provide electricity for large scale AI and cloud computing facilities.

== Operations ==
=== Electric power ===
Constellation provides electric power to commercial and industrial customers. Its electricity supply business manages energy sales, dispatch, and delivery from Exelon's power generation portfolio to utilities, municipal co-ops, and energy retailers nationwide. As of 2018, Constellation had around 360 megawatts of solar generation assets that are either in operation or under construction across the United States, including Maryland, California, Arizona, New Jersey, and Texas. In 2011, Constellation was contracted to construct and operate what was then the largest rooftop solar array ever constructed for the Toys-R-Us distribution center in Flanders, New Jersey.

The company's offsite renewables service (CORe) provides access to offsite renewable energy projects through a retail power contract. CORe combines location-specific renewable energy purchases and certificates with a physical load-following energy supply contract.

=== Natural gas ===
Constellation delivers approximately 730 billion cubic feet (21 billion cubic metres) of natural gas annually to customers, making it one of the ten largest natural gas marketers in the United States. The company oversees trading, transport, and storage of physical gas supply, pricing, hedging, and risk management.

=== Constellation Technology Ventures ===
Constellation Technology Ventures (CTV), Constellation's venture capital fund, invests in start-up companies with emerging energy technologies. Their portfolio includes Proterra, ChargePoint and Aquion Energy.

=== Nuclear ===
Constellation is the United States' leading nuclear power plant operator, with over 19,000 megawatts.

- Braidwood Nuclear Generating Station (Illinois)
- Byron Nuclear Generating Station (Illinois)
- Calvert Cliffs Nuclear Power Plant (Maryland)
- Clinton Nuclear Generating Station (Illinois)
- Dresden Generating Station (Illinois)
- Ginna Nuclear Generating Station (New York)
- James A. FitzPatrick Nuclear Power Plant (New York)
- LaSalle County Nuclear Generating Station (Illinois)
- Limerick Nuclear Power Plant (Pennsylvania)
- Nine Mile Point Nuclear Generating Station (New York)
- Peach Bottom Atomic Power Station (Pennsylvania)
- Quad Cities Nuclear Generating Station (Illinois)
- Salem Nuclear Power Plant (New Jersey) (minority owner)
- Three Mile Island Nuclear Generating Station (Pennsylvania) (Unit 2 owned by EnergySolutions)
- South Texas Nuclear Generating Station (Texas) (Minority owner)

=== Fossil ===
Constellation owns and operates a portfolio of fossil fuel and other sources generating more than 12,000 megawatts (MW) of power.

- Chester Generating Station – oil (Pennsylvania), which is distinct from the historic Chester Waterside Station
- Colorado Bend II Energy Center – natural gas (Texas)
- Croydon Generating Station – oil (Pennsylvania)
- Delaware Generating Station – oil (Pennsylvania)
- Eddystone Generating Station – natural gas and oil (Pennsylvania)
- Everett LNG Facility – natural gas imports (Massachusetts) a.k.a. Distrigas, purchased in 2019
- Falls Generating Station – oil (Pennsylvania)
- Framingham Generating Station – oil (Massachusetts)
- Grande Prairie Generating Station – natural gas (Alberta, Canada)
- Handley Generating Station – natural gas (Texas)
- Handsome Lake Generating Station – natural gas (Pennsylvania)
- Hillabee Generating Station – natural gas (Alabama)
- Moser Generating Station – oil (Pennsylvania)
- Mystic Generating Station – natural gas (Massachusetts)
- Perryman Generating Station – oil and natural gas (Maryland)
- Philadelphia Road Generating Station – oil (Maryland)
- Richmond Generating Station – oil (Pennsylvania)
- Schuylkill Generating Station – oil (Pennsylvania)
- Southwark Generating Station – oil (Pennsylvania)
- West Medway Generating Station I – oil (Massachusetts)
- West Medway Generating Station II – natural gas or oil (Massachusetts)
- Wolf Hollow II Generating Station – natural gas (Texas)
- Wyman Generating Station – oil (Maine) (minority owner)

=== Hydro ===
Constellation's two hydroelectric plants generate 1,600 MW of power.

- Conowingo Dam (Maryland)
- Muddy Run Pumped Storage Facility (Pennsylvania)

=== Solar ===
- Antelope Valley Solar Ranch One (California)

=== Wind ===
Constellation has 27 wind projects in ten states, totaling nearly 1,400 megawatts (MW).

=== Generation services ===
Constellation owns Constellation Generation Solutions (CGS). CGS functions as an industry-leading maintenance and technical services organization emphasizing precision and quality, structured to streamline the work execution of the nuclear fleet.

Constellation PowerLabs is a wholly owned subsidiary of Constellation. Since 1911, PowerLabs has transformed from supporting the power industry to becoming Exelon's primary calibrations and testing laboratory. It has four individual labs strategically located from the upper Midwest to the Northeast, enabling experienced staff in engineering, metrology, and nuclear power generation to support the urgent demands of our nation's nuclear facilities, power grids, and critical supply chains.

== Legal and regulatory proceedings ==
Constellation Energy and affiliated entities have been involved in several regulatory, legal, and environmental matters.

In March 2012, the Federal Energy Regulatory Commission approved a settlement with Constellation Energy Commodities Group, Inc. to resolve investigations into alleged manipulation of electricity markets operated by ISO New England and the New York Independent System Operator. Under the settlement, the company agreed to pay a $135 million civil penalty and disgorge $110 million in profits. FERC described the matter as involving its Anti-Manipulation Rule and imposed market-participation restrictions on individual traders, compliance enhancements, and compliance monitoring.

In October 2013, FERC approved another settlement with Constellation Energy Commodities Group, Inc. involving transactions in the California Independent System Operator market. FERC’s civil-penalty listing says the company paid a $500,000 civil penalty and $145,928 in disgorgement, and that the settlement resolved an admitted violation involving falsely designated transactions submitted to improperly ensure bid awards at multiple interties.

Constellation has also been involved in environmental disputes related to the Conowingo Dam in Maryland, which is operated by a Constellation subsidiary. In 2025, Maryland officials announced an agreement with Constellation Energy, Waterkeepers Chesapeake, and the Lower Susquehanna Riverkeeper Association valued at more than $340 million. The agreement was intended to address water-quality impacts associated with the dam’s operation and support relicensing of the hydroelectric facility. The agreement followed years of litigation and regulatory disputes over responsibility for pollution, sediment, and nutrient impacts downstream from the dam.

In 2025, Constellation Energy was also named as a defendant in a proposed federal class-action antitrust lawsuit involving U.S. nuclear power plant operators. The lawsuit alleged that nuclear operators and consulting firms shared compensation information in ways that suppressed worker pay. The claims were allegations at the time of filing, and litigation remained pending against multiple defendants.

In December 2025, the U.S. Department of Justice announced a proposed antitrust settlement requiring divestitures in connection with Constellation’s proposed $26.6 billion acquisition of Calpine. The Justice Department said the proposed settlement was intended to preserve competition in electricity generation markets by requiring the divestiture of six power plants. The complaint alleged that the acquisition, without the divestitures, would violate Section 7 of the Clayton Act.

== Baltimore community involvement ==
=== Historical archives ===
Constellation owns the archives of the Baltimore Gas & Electric Company, the former Consolidated Gas Light, Electric Power Company of Baltimore City, and its ancient predecessor, the Gas Light Company of Baltimore. The Baltimore Gas & Electric Company's photographic collection consists of approximately 250,000 photographic prints and negatives, in more than 50,000 series. The archives are held by the Baltimore Museum of Industry.

=== Philanthropy ===
Constellation ranks second in local corporate giving among Baltimore-based companies, and donated $7.10 million in 2017. The company also provides grants to local schools that implement education programs promoting science and technology.

== See also ==
- Calvert Cliffs Nuclear Generating Station, on the Chesapeake Bay, Calvert County; Lusby, Maryland
- Conemaugh Generating Station
- Ginna Nuclear Generating Station
- Keystone Generating Station
- Nine Mile Point Nuclear Generating Station
- Safe Harbor Dam, on the Susquehanna River, Pennsylvania
