= Criterion Wind Project =

Coordinates: 39°25′2.67″N 79°16′41.9″W

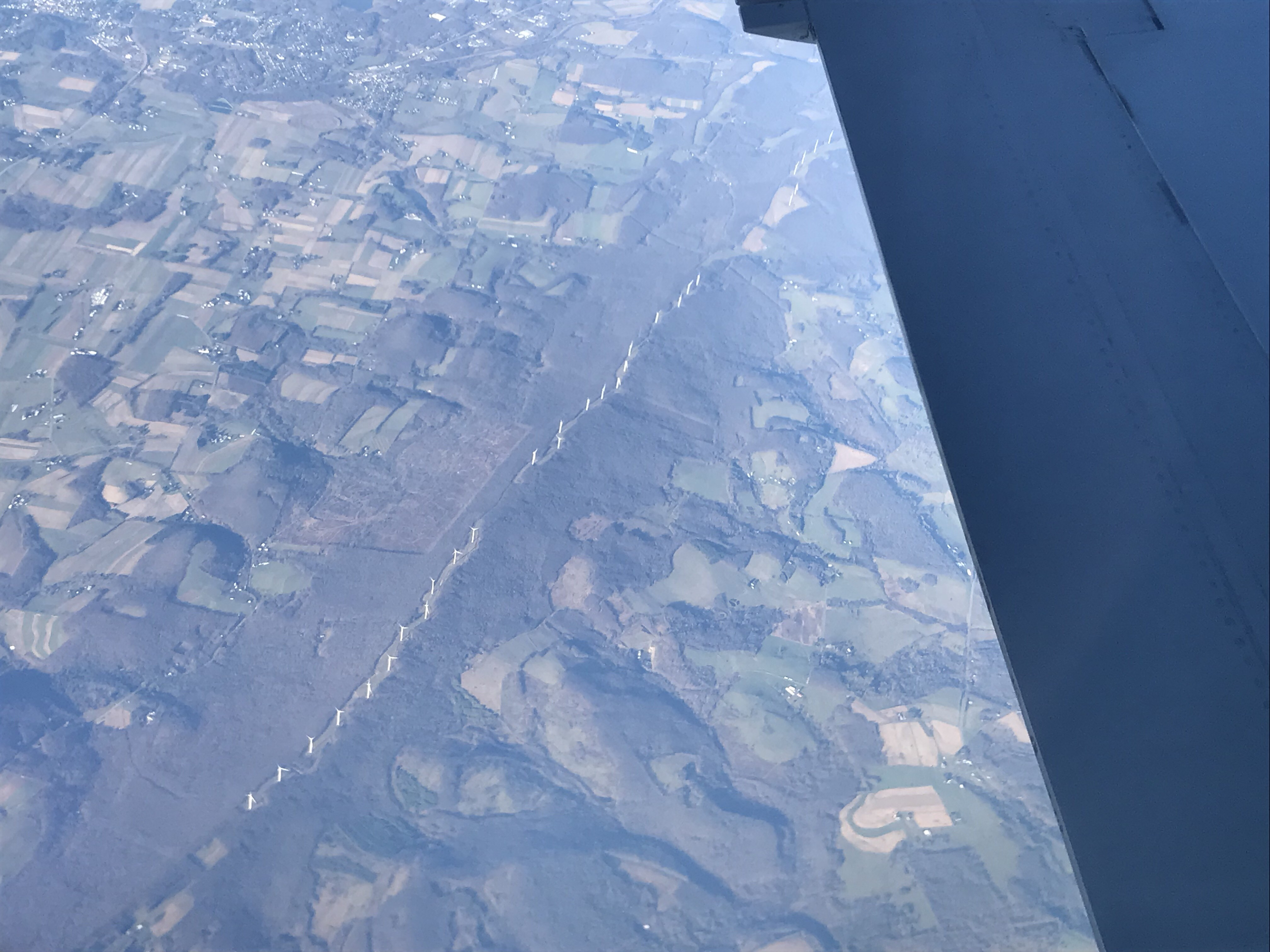
Criterion Wind Farm (top) as seen from a commercial airliner. The bottom twelve turbines are part of Fair Wind Wind Farm.

The Criterion Wind Project is a wind farm located on Backbone Mountain east of Oakland, Maryland, United States. The project has a rated capacity of 70 MW and uses 28 Liberty Wind Turbines manufactured by Clipper Windpower. Each of the wind turbines is about 415 feet tall. The Criterion Wind Project is owned by Criterion Power Partners, LLC, which is a subisiary of Exelon, and interconnected with the transmission system of the Potomac Edison Company (a subsidiary of FirstEnergy). Electricity and renewable energy credits from the project are sold to the Old Dominion Electric Cooperative under a 20-year supply contract.

== History ==
The Criterion Wind Project was originally proposed in 2002 by Clipper Windpower as a 101 MW project consisting of 67 1.8 MW. On March 26, 2003, the Maryland Public Service Commission issued a certificate of public convenience and necessity authorizing the construction of the wind farm. Opponents of the project filed a series of lawsuits which delayed construction of the project. In 2007, legislation was enacted by the Maryland General Assembly to streamline the permitting of wind farms with a capacity up to 70 MW. To meet the new statutory requirements, the Criterion Wind Project was then reconfigured as a 70 MW project consisting of 28 2.5 MW wind turbines. Clipper Windpower then sold the project to Constellation Energy, which completed the project in December 2010.

== Awards and recognition ==
As of June 5, 2019, The Criterion Wind Wildlife Program received The Environmental Award at the 2019 Safety Summit in Washington D.C. The award is presented to a team of Exelon employees in recognition of their dedication of continued safety and environmental consciousness throughout the time spent working on their project. The recipients received $7,500.

== Concerns regarding birds and bats ==
A lawsuit was filed in December 2010 against the Criterion Wind Project alleging that the project must obtain an Incidental Take Permit from the U.S. Fish and Wildlife Service for any Indiana bats killed or injured by the turbine blades. A pre-construction survey conducted over two years did not find any endangered bats such as the Indiana bat at the project site.

On July 31, 2012, the U.S. Fish and Wildlife Service released a draft Habitat Conservation Plan developed for the Criterion Wind Project with proposed measures to protect the Indiana bat for public comments through September 28, 2012. After the comment period ends, the Service will determine if the application meets the permit issuance requirements.

== See also ==
- Environmental impact of wind power
