= Bowleys Quarters, Maryland =

- Census-designated place
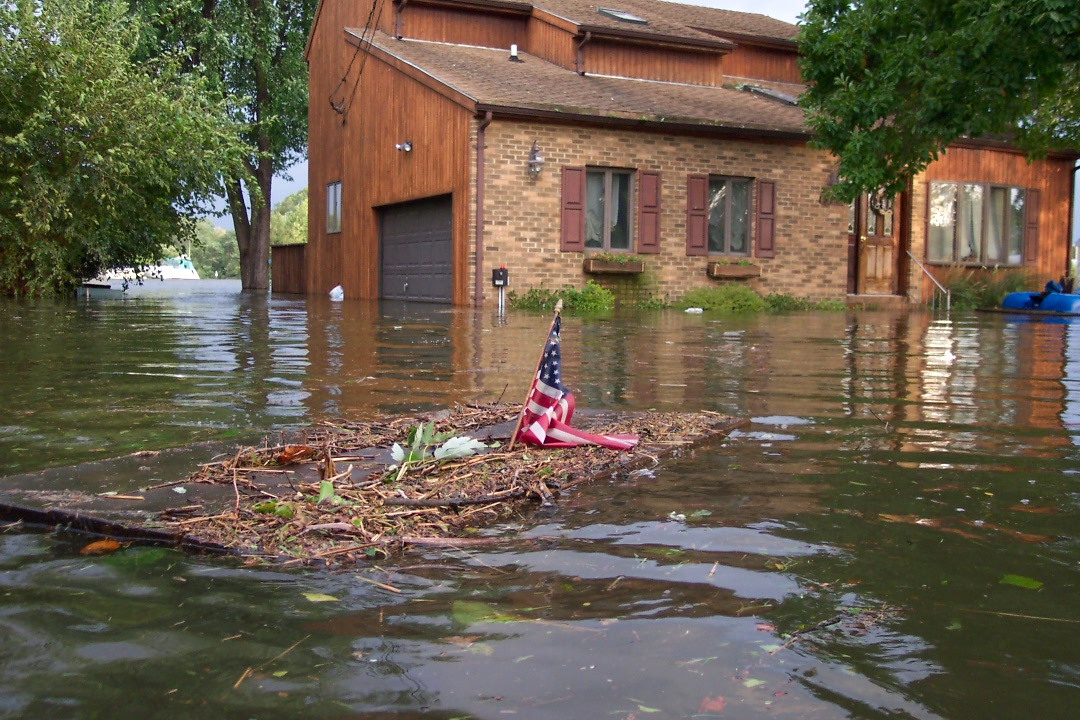
- Bowleys Quarters in September 2003, with damage from Hurricane Isabel visible.

- Location of Bowleys Quarters, Maryland
- Coordinates: 39°19′17″N 76°23′18″W
- Country: United States
- State: Maryland
- County: Baltimore

Area
  - Total: 6.13 sq mi (15.88 km^{2})
  - Land: 3.15 sq mi (8.15 km^{2})
  - Water: 2.98 sq mi (7.73 km^{2})
- Elevation: 46 ft (14 m)

Population (2020)
  - Total: 6,853
  - Density: 2,178.7/sq mi (841.22/km^{2})
- Time zone: UTC−5 (Eastern (EST))
  - Summer (DST): UTC−4 (EDT)
- FIPS code: 24-08800
- GNIS feature ID: 0589790

Bowleys Quarters is an unincorporated community and census-designated place in Baltimore County, Maryland, United States, with a population of 6,755 at the 2010 census.

== History ==
Bowleys Quarters was named for Daniel Bowley, a merchant and sea captain who owned some 2,000 acres (8.1 km^{2}) around Baltimore in the mid-18th century. Bowleys Quarters was used to house his slaves. The area later became a game preserve for waterfowl and a place where presidents and others, including Babe Ruth, came to hunt ducks. The area eventually became known as a vacation spot, and many summer homes were built along the water. Many blue-collar workers were attracted during the industrial boom of the 1920s through the 1950s. Many worked at the nearby Glenn L. Martin company (now Lockheed Martin) and Bethlehem Steel. The community experienced an economic downturn with downsizing of the Martin facility and other area businesses, and Bowleys Quarters became a mix of middle-class homes juxtaposed with modern waterfront homes. Increased interest in waterfront property in the 1990s, combined with the devastation of Hurricane Isabel, has led to revitalization, with some new homes selling for more than $1 million. Once predominantly populated by low-income to middle-class families, the community is now highly desirable for waterfront living.

In September 2003, Bowleys Quarters was substantially damaged by Hurricane Isabel and the resulting flood. According to The Baltimore Sun, Isabel destroyed 210 houses in Bowleys Quarters and caused major damage to 632 others.

In 2024, the first semi-professional soccer team in Bowleys Quarters was founded, Bowleys Athletic Club. The team was founded by goalkeeper Austin Heid and competes in the United Premier Soccer League.

== Geography ==
Bowleys Quarters is located at 39°19′17″N 76°23′18″W.

According to the United States Census Bureau, the CDP has a total area of 6.1 square miles (16 km^{2}), of which 3.2 square miles (8.3 km^{2}) is land and 2.9 square miles (7.5 km^{2}), or 47.39%, is water.

== Demographics ==
Historical population
Census	Pop.	Note	%±
1990	5,595		—
2000	6,314		12.9%
2010	6,755		7.0%
2020	6,853		1.5%

=== Racial and ethnic composition ===
Bowleys Quarters CDP, Maryland – Racial and ethnic composition Note: the US Census treats Hispanic/Latino as an ethnic category. This table excludes Latinos from the racial categories and assigns them to a separate category. Hispanics/Latinos may be of any race.
Race / Ethnicity (NH = Non-Hispanic)	Pop 2000	Pop 2010	Pop 2020	% 2000	% 2010	% 2020
White alone (NH)	5,768	5,632	4,942	91.35%	83.38%	72.11%
Black or African American alone (NH)	386	747	1,231	6.11%	11.06%	17.96%
Native American or Alaska Native alone (NH)	13	10	17	0.21%	0.15%	0.25%
Asian alone (NH)	39	73	106	0.62%	1.08%	1.55%
Native Hawaiian or Pacific Islander alone (NH)	3	0	3	0.05%	0.00%	0.04%
Other race alone (NH)	4	3	25	0.06%	0.04%	0.36%
Mixed race or Multiracial (NH)	65	115	296	1.03%	1.70%	4.32%
Hispanic or Latino (any race)	36	175	233	0.57%	2.59%	3.40%
Total	6,314	6,755	6,853	100.00%	100.00%	100.00%

=== 2020 census ===
As of the 2020 census, Bowleys Quarters had a population of 6,853. The median age was 41.5 years. 19.9% of residents were under the age of 18 and 15.6% were 65 years of age or older. For every 100 females, there were 93.0 males, and for every 100 females age 18 and over, there were 92.1 males.

All residents lived in urban areas, with 0.0% living in rural areas.

There were 2,769 households in Bowleys Quarters, of which 28.6% had children under the age of 18 living in them. Of all households, 47.4% were married-couple households, 17.6% had a male householder with no spouse or partner present, and 26.6% had a female householder with no spouse or partner present. About 24.3% of all households were made up of individuals, and 8.9% had someone living alone who was 65 years of age or older.

There were 3,037 housing units, of which 8.8% were vacant. The homeowner vacancy rate was 1.6% and the rental vacancy rate was 12.0%.

=== 2000 census ===
As of the census of 2000, there were 6,314 people, 2,483 households, and 1,748 families residing in the CDP. The population density was 1,954.8 inhabitants per square mile (754.8/km^{2}). There were 2,721 housing units at an average density of 842.4 per square mile (325.3/km^{2}). The racial makeup of the CDP was 91.65% White, 6.13% African American, 0.21% Native American, 0.65% Asian, 0.05% Pacific Islander, 0.29% from other races, and 1.03% from two or more races. Hispanic or Latino of any race were 0.57% of the population.

There were 2,483 households, of which 33.3% had children under the age of 18 living with them, 54.0% were married couples living together, 11.3% had a female householder with no husband present, and 29.6% were non-families. 22.3% of all households were made up of individuals, and 6.6% had someone living alone who was 65 years of age or older. The average household size was 2.54 and the average family size was 2.98.

In the CDP, the population was spread out, with 24.6% under the age of 18, 8.0% from 18 to 24, 34.0% from 25 to 44, 23.1% from 45 to 64, and 10.3% who were 65 years of age or older. The median age was 36 years. For every 100 females, there were 98.3 males. For every 100 females age 18 and over, there were 96.8 males.

The median income for a household in the CDP was $52,250, and the median income for a family was $61,024. Males had a median income of $41,881 versus $27,265 for females. The per capita income for the CDP was $23,295. About 5.5% of families and 6.6% of the population were below the poverty line, including 7.8% of those under age 18 and 10.7% of those ages 65 or over.
