= Dickerson, Maryland =

Unincorporated community in Maryland, United States

Coordinates: 39°13′12″N 77°25′27″W

- Unincorporated community
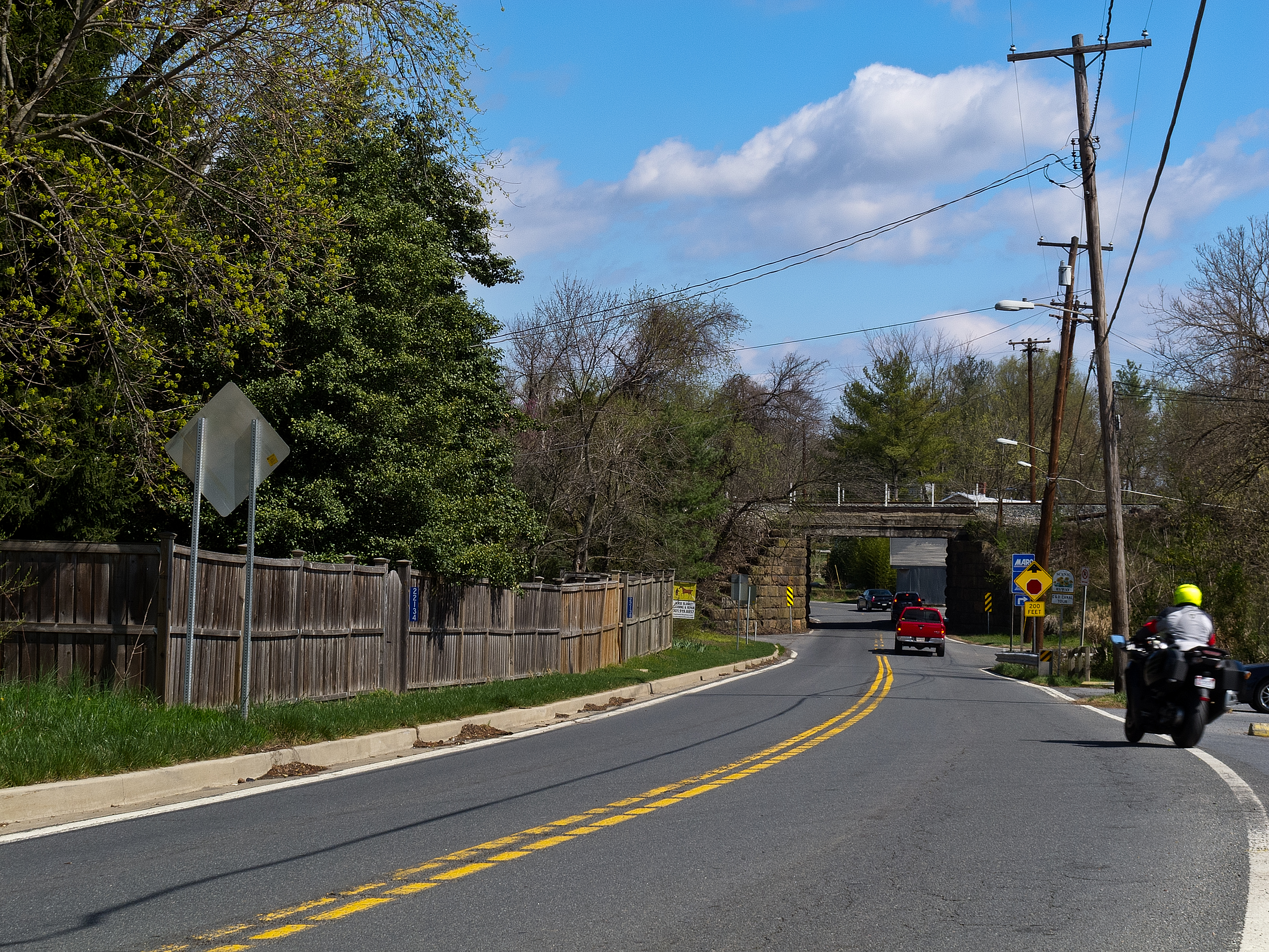
- Interactive map of Dickerson, Maryland
- Country: United States
- State: Maryland
- County: Montgomery

Population (2000)
  - Total: 1,848
- ZIP code: 20842

Dickerson is an unincorporated community in Montgomery County, Maryland. It is on Maryland Route 28, between Sugarloaf Mountain and the Potomac River. It is a community near the town of Poolesville, Maryland. Dickerson is 61.5 square miles (159 km^{2}).

== History ==
Dickerson was officially founded in 1871. It was named after its first postmaster, William H. Dickerson, who served from 1873 to 1897. The earliest land grant known to have been given out in the land that is now Dickerson was granted to Arthur Nelson: He received 97 acres (390,000 m^{2}) in 1739. Most of what is now considered Dickerson originally belonged to Nathan Hempstone.

Before the Civil War, Dickerson was little more than a couple roads, a store, and a few houses. After the Civil War, the population began to rise more sharply. This was because after the Civil War, the Baltimore and Ohio Railroad Company were able to continue their hunt for a route to place the Metropolitan Branch. Travelers wanted a way to travel west toward the capital and other places without having to go to Baltimore first. They decided on a route that passed through Dickerson and began construction. The railroad line going from Dickerson to Point of Rocks, MD was finished in 1871; the entire line was open for public use in 1873.

The Monocacy Site was listed on the National Register of Historic Places in 1975.

== Businesses and local economy ==
=== Neutron Products Inc. ===
Dickerson is home to Neutron Products Inc., a low-level nuclear facility operating since the 1960s (EPA ID# MDN000305785). The site is described by the EPA as follows:

"The facility had four Nuclear Regulatory licenses, but because of many past violations, is under permanent injunction prohibiting operation of its license to manufacture radioactive materials. Neutron appealed this injunction to the highest court in Maryland, and the court upheld the injunction. Because the facility no longer is licensed to manufacture, the Maryland Department of the Environment is concerned about its economic state, and therefore, its ability to effectively store, handle and clean up radioactive materials."

It is listed as a Superfund site.

They further note: "From 1989 through 1996, approximately 150 radioactive particles of Cobalt-60 have been found within a kilometer of the Neutron plant. Employees' homes, cars and unrestricted areas of the plant have been found to be contaminated with radioactive material. Radioactive contamination has also been released through effluent to unsecured properties outside the Neutron boundaries, including two adjacent railroad properties." A copy of the Department of Energy report on Neutron Products from 1994 can be downloaded. As late as 2002, the activities continued to make news as reported in the Washington Biz Journal with a small amount of radioactive waste dumped in regular trash.

=== Dickerson Store ===
The Dickerson Store was originally built for and used as a supply depot for the workers constructing the railroad around 1870. When the railroad was completed, it continued to serve the townspeople and local farmers as a general store. A post office was put in the store in 1891. The store has been moved three times: first in 1890 to allow space for the train station; second, when they widened road in 1910; and last in 1928 when they added a second track to the railroad. It is not currently in use.

=== Dickerson Market ===
The Dickerson Market is at 22145 Dickerson Rd. It was constructed in 1946 and was called Dronenburg's Store after the family that originally operated it. The Post Office was moved from the Dickerson Store to the Dickerson Market in 1960. The store has exchanged hands several times. It was briefly owned by Arthur Stull (at this time called "Stull's Grocery"). It then was operated by Robert Thacker, who gave it the name "Dickerson Market". Now, it is owned by Buck Fowler.

=== Dickerson Generating Station ===
The Dickerson Generating Station started in 1959.

The Montgomery County Resource Recovery Facility, a 56 MW generating incineration plant that burns municipal garbage and waste, is next to the Dickerson Generating Station. This waste-to-energy plant is served by the CSX railroad line, which delivers trash from a central collection center in Derwood to the plant. The Montgomery County Resource Recovery Facility is operated by the Northeast Maryland Waste Disposal Authority, a state-owned corporation. All of the generating plants at the Dickerson Generating Station were built by the Potomac Electric Power Company, which sold them to the Southern Company in December 2000 as a result of the restructuring of the electricity generating industry in Maryland. The station was included in the spin-off from the Southern Company of Mirant in April 2001, which has since operated and maintained the plant.

In 1991, the 900-foot (270 m)-long cooling water discharge channel from the power plant, which empties into the Potomac River, became the Dickerson Whitewater Course, a canoe and kayak training facility for the 1992 Olympic Games.

The Montgomery County Resource Recovery Facility began operations in 1995.

== Demographics ==
Dickerson is 86% Caucasian, 9.7% African-American, 2.9% Hispanic, 1% Asian, and 1% 'other'. The population is 49.6% female and 50.4% male. The median age is 43 years. The median female age is 42.7 years and the median male age is 43.5 years. There are currently 747 households in Dickerson, and the average size of the household is 2.67 people. The average household income is $89,120. Approximately 67.4% of the people are employed, 1.5% are unemployed, and 31.1% are not in the work force.

== Transportation ==
Dickerson station on MARC's Brunswick Line provides commuter rail service to Washington, D.C.

== See also ==
- Dickerson (MARC station)
- Dickerson Whitewater Course
- Sugarloaf Mountain owned and operated by the non-profit Stronghold Inc.
