= Maryland Electric Deregulation =

Maryland Electric Deregulation is the result of a Bill passed in 1999 by the Maryland General Assembly. This bill changed the entire face of the Maryland utility industry.

In 1999, the Maryland General Assembly, under pressure from state manufacturers, enacted legislation that would cause the electric industry in Maryland to become deregulated. This bill, the Electric Customer Choice and Competition Act of 1999, was passed through the Maryland General Assembly with many Democratic and every Republican legislator's support. The bill was signed into law by Democratic Governor Parris Glendening who was not in favor of deregulation, but was threatened with an override if he opted to veto. Prior to this legislation, the local electric utility was in charge of procuring and delivering power to the people in their service territory. Under the new legislation, the consumer could choose to continue purchasing power from the local utility (known as Standard Offer Service (SOS) or Provider of Last Resort (POLR)) or to purchase power from an electric retail supplier. The local utility would still be responsible for the delivery of the power.

As of 2012, Maryland residents had the 15th highest electricity rates in the United States and average monthly residential electric bills in Maryland were the 4th highest in the nation. According to the Maryland Public Service Commission, Maryland considered deregulating "to put downward pressure on costs, thus providing consumers with the lowest possible prices for electricity, to allow all customers to choose their power supplier, to provide incentives for the creation and development of innovative products and services." The Maryland General Assembly placed several stipulations in the legislation designed to foster competition and maintain a level playing field between the retail suppliers and the local utilities. First, the utility would be required to eliminate their generation plants, either through sale or through transfer to a non-regulated business unit. This would force both the suppliers and the utility to use the wholesale energy market to procure power. Baltimore Gas and Electric Company (BGE) chose to transfer its generation to Constellation Generation Group. Both BGE and Constellation Generation Group are subsidiaries of Constellation.

Second, customers would be forced to stay on POLR rates for a number of years. During this time, POLR rates would remain frozen at a certain rate. This frozen rate was set between 3% and 7.5% lower than 1999 prices. Some companies, like BGE, had not increased their electricity rates since 1993. Therefore, in this period, customers would be paying less than for electricity than they had six years prior. Once that time was over, customers could shop for a different supplier and POLR rates would change from the capped rate to the market rate. The amount of time that rates would be frozen varied by company and by customer class (residential, commercial, industrial, etc.). Over a period of 6 years, various customers' rates became unfrozen without incident. In 2007, however, that changed.

In 2007, one of Maryland's largest groups, BGE's customers, was slated to move to market rates. Enormous rate increases in the wholesale electricity industry at that time meant that, while their rates would become comparable to other Maryland utilities, BGE customers would have their rates increased by 72%. This increase, greater than any other utility and coupled with election year politics, created a huge outcry.

== The perfect storm ==
The events leading up to the 72% increase in customer's rates has been referred to by BGE executives, state commissioners, and state legislators as "the perfect storm". In the years since rates were capped, fuel prices had risen dramatically. Natural gas prices had risen about 125%, regular gasoline prices had risen over 150%, and heating oil prices had risen almost 200%. Maryland region's fuel prices are tied greatly to natural gas prices. Subsequently, when Hurricane Katrina and Rita caused major natural gas pipelines to shut down for a short period, natural gas prices skyrocketed. Therefore, when BGE went to the market to procure power, prices for power were abnormally high.

== Competition ==
Other energy providers are currently available for residential use and are indexed by the Maryland Public Service Commission: Energy Supplier Information.
