= GenOn Energy =

Defunct American corporation

- Type: Private
- Traded as: NYSE: GEN
- Industry: Electric Utilities
- Founded: 2001; 25 years ago
- Headquarters: Reliant Energy Plaza; Houston, Texas, United States
- Area served: Texas, Pennsylvania, New Jersey, Maryland
- Key people: Joel V. Staff (chairman); Mark M. Jacobs (CEO); Brian Landrum (Executive VP and COO)
- Website: genon.com

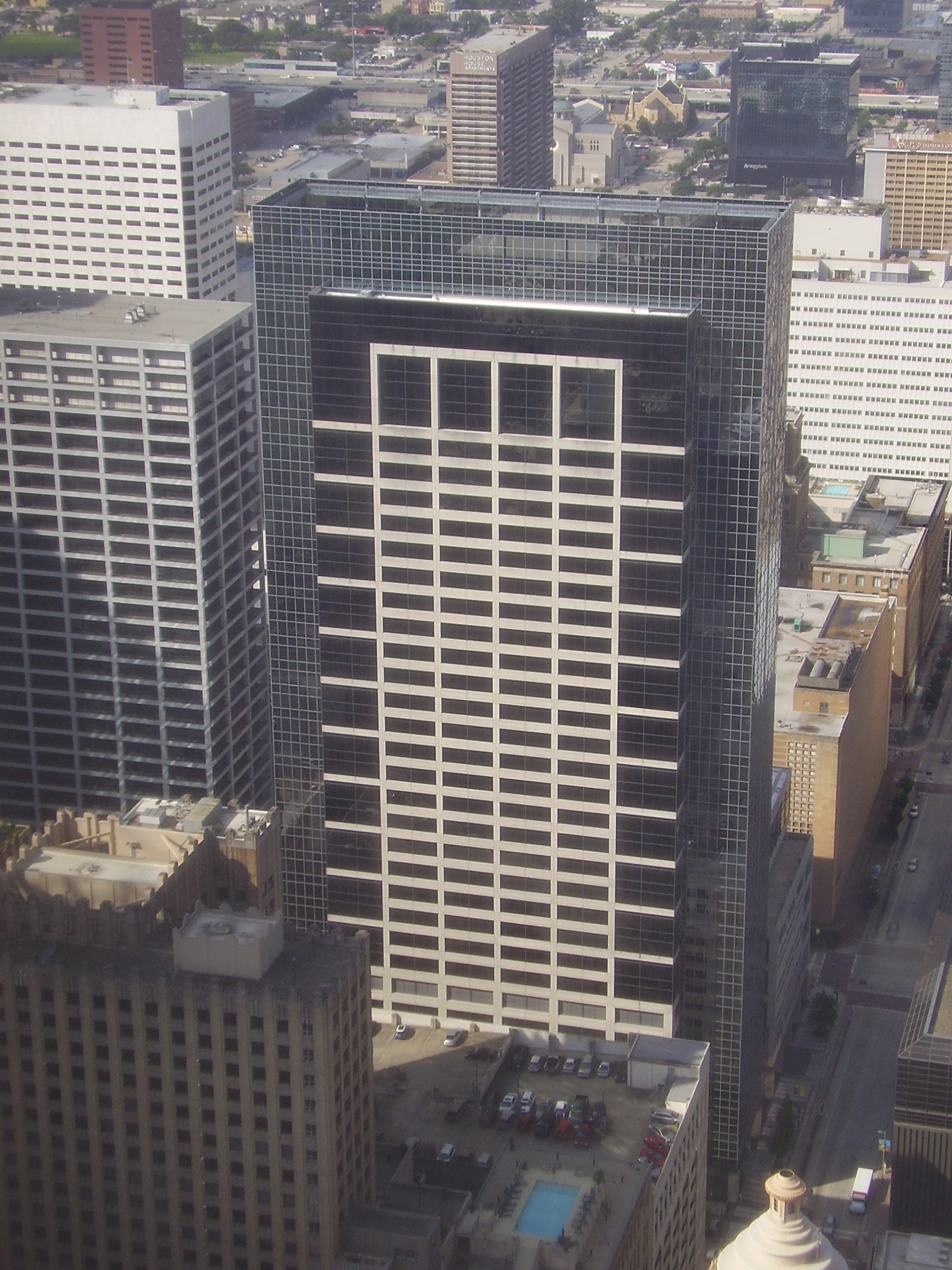
RRI Energy Plaza, headquarters of RRI Energy

GenOn Energy, Inc., based in Houston, Texas, United States, is an energy company that provides electricity to wholesale customers in the United States. The company is one of the largest independent power producers in the nation with more than 7,000 megawatts of power generation capacity across the United States using natural gas, fuel oil and coal. GenOn Energy was headquartered in the Reliant Energy Plaza in Downtown Houston. The company, formerly known as RRI Energy, acquired Mirant on December 3, 2010. The corporate names and logos of both RRI Energy and Mirant were retired.

NRG Energy completed its acquisition of GenOn Energy in December 2012 for $1.7 billion. GenOn's stock ceased trading and was exchanged for NRG stock.

== History ==
The company was originally known as Houston Industries (NYSE: HOU), and Houston Lighting & Power was its subsidiary. In August 1996 HI closed on a merger with NorAm Energy Corp, a natural gas utility. The combined company, as of 1997, had assets of $18 billion and annual revenues of about $9 billion. By November 1997 there was a published report stating that the company wished to acquire Central & South West Corp. HI declined to comment.

In 1999, Houston Industries changed its name to Reliant Energy and its new NYSE symbol was REI. It was scheduled to begin trading under REI on February 8, 1999.

In 2002, Texas deregulated the electricity market and Reliant then competed against other energy companies like Direct Energy and TXU Energy. At this time, Reliant Energy also separated into two publicly traded companies: Reliant Resources, Inc. and CenterPoint Energy, Inc. (NYSE: CNP).

When the state of Texas deregulated the electricity market, the former HL&P was split into several companies. In 2003 HL&P was split into Reliant Energy, Texas Genco, and CenterPoint Energy.

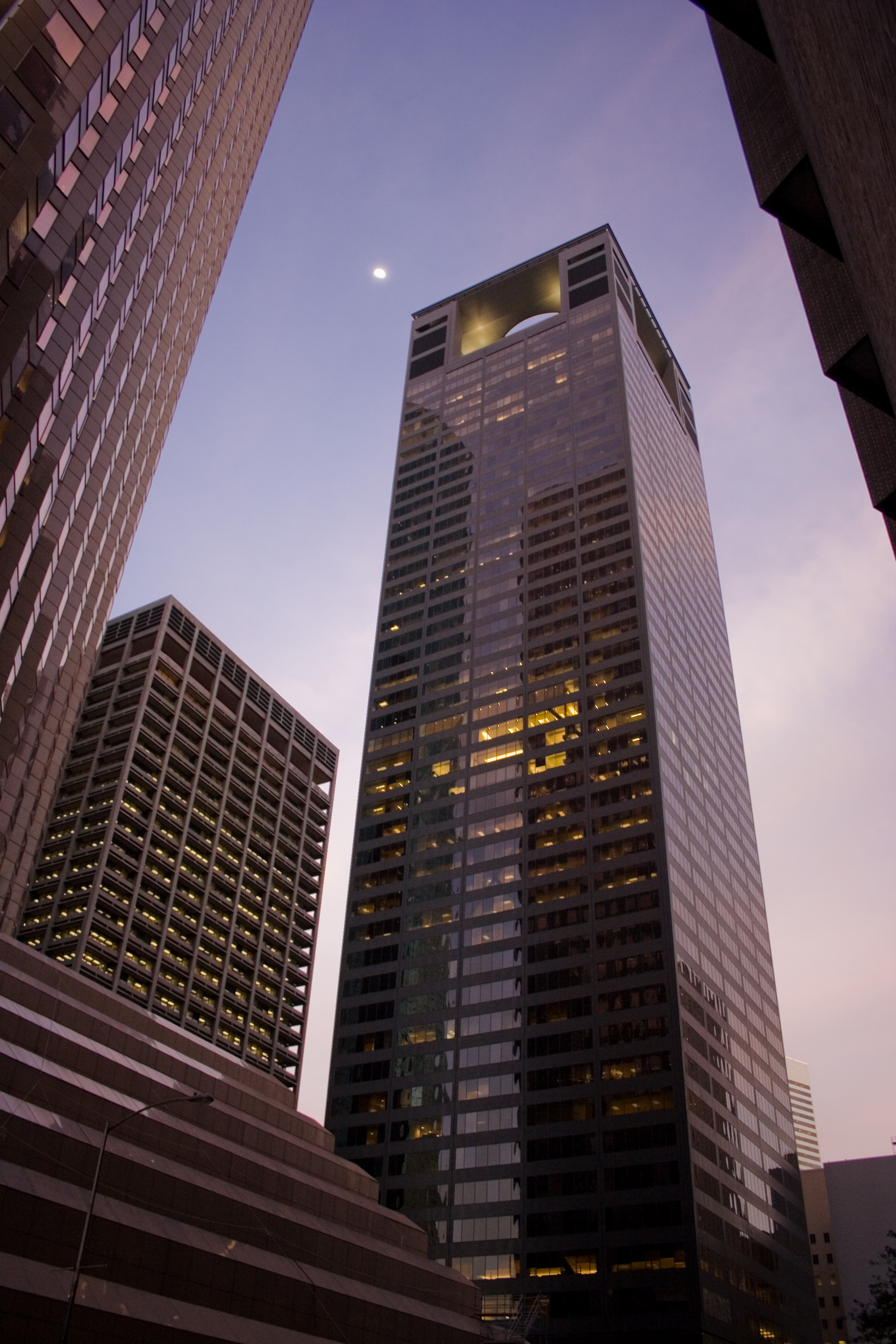
The CenterPoint Energy Plaza, previously the Houston Industries Building, once served as the company headquarters

CenterPoint Energy was created when Reliant Energy merged with an indirect subsidiary of CenterPoint Energy, Inc. As a result of the merger, Reliant Energy shareholders received one share of CenterPoint common stock in exchange for each share of RRI common stock they held before the merger. A regulated utility, CenterPoint Energy became one of the largest U.S. energy delivery companies, serving 4.7 million metered customers. In late 2002, CenterPoint distributed the stock of Reliant Resources, Inc. to CenterPoint shareholders. This spin-off created Reliant Resources with a strategy to provide competitive wholesale and retail energy service under the Reliant Energy brand. Its businesses included power generation and retail energy services in Texas newly deregulated electricity market. On the wholesale side, Reliant owned, had an interest in, or leased 37 operating power generation facilities serving five regions of the United States.

In January 2007, the Texas electricity market became fully deregulated, and Reliant began to offer an array of products, flexible service options, and pricing arrangements to a variety of customers. At this time, Reliant was the second largest mass market electricity provider in the state of Texas, with an annual revenue of $10.9 billion and more than 3,500 employees. In February 2007, Reliant Energy announced plans for Mark Jacobs, current chief financial operator, to succeed Joel Staff as chief executive officer and for Brian Landrum to become chief operating officer.

On May 1, 2009, Reliant Energy's retail electricity business was purchased by NRG Energy. The retail group retained the name Reliant Energy and the surviving wholesale business was renamed RRI Energy, Inc.

On June 15, 2017, unable to meet debt obligations, GenOn Energy and GenOn Americas Generation file for Chapter 11 bankruptcy.

=== Merger to create GenOn Energy ===
Historical logo of RRI Energy

On April 11, 2010, RRI Energy and Atlanta-based Mirant Corp. announced an agreement to merge in a $1.6 billion all-stock deal, which created one of the largest independent power plant operators in the country. The new company, named GenOn Energy, would be based in Houston but led by Mirant's Chairman and CEO Edward Muller until 2013. At that time, Muller would retire and Mark Jacobs, the president and COO of RRI Energy, would become CEO of GenOn. The new company had a market capitalization of about $3 billion, owning or operating 47 plants in 12 states capable of generating more than 24,650 megawatts of power. The merger was completed on December 3, 2010.

== California energy crisis ==
In March 2004, a grand jury returned a six-count indictment against Reliant Energy Services, Inc. and four of its officers—Jackie Thomas, a former vice president of Reliant's Power Trading Division; Reggie Howard, a former director of Reliant's West Power Trading Division; Lisa Flowers, a term trader for Reliant's West Power Trading Division; and Kevin Frankeny, Reliant's manager of western operations—for their alleged role in the California electricity crisis. All of the defendants are residents of Texas.

The defendants were charged with conspiracy to commit wire fraud and commodities manipulation and wire fraud, as well as manipulation and attempted manipulation of the price of a commodity in interstate commerce. The indictments were filed on April 8, 2004. On August 15, 2005, Reliant announced that it had reached a $445 million settlement with the states of California, Oregon and Washington, resolving civil litigation claims against the company related to the sale of electricity in the California electricity crisis of 2000 and 2001. In March 2007, Reliant agreed to pay a $22.2 million penalty in addition to a $13.8 million credit provided in a previous settlement with the Federal Energy Regulatory Commission.

== Environmental record ==
Researchers at the University of Massachusetts Amherst have identified Reliant Energy as the 36th-largest corporate producer of air pollution in the United States, with roughly 34 million pounds of toxic chemicals released into the air every year. Major pollutants indicated by the study include sulfuric and hydrochloric acid as well as manganese, chromium, and nickel compounds.

In December 2007, the US state of New Jersey sued Reliant Energy, claiming that emissions from a Pennsylvania coal-fired power plant hurt the state's air quality. New Jersey claims emissions of smog and acid rain components sulfur dioxide and nitrogen oxides from Reliant's Portland Generating Station in Northampton County, Pennsylvania, drift into its territory. The lawsuit also claims that Reliant violated the federal Clean Air Act by modifying and operating the plant without required pollution control equipment and construction permits. In February 2012, in response to an EPA ruling, GenOn Energy announced they would be shutting down the Portland Generating Station in 2015.

Reliant Energy claims to have made efforts toward more environmentally safe practices through the use of renewable resources such as solar energy, wind power, landfill gas, and coal refuse.

== See also ==
- CenterPoint Energy
- Deregulation of the Texas electricity market
- Electric Reliability Council of Texas (ERCOT)
- California electricity crisis
