= Terrence Lore Smith =

American mystery author

Terrence Lore Smith (1942 – December 7, 1988) was an American mystery writer best known as the author of the best-selling novel The Thief Who Came to Dinner (1969), which was made into the 1973 film of the same name starring Ryan O’Neal and Jacqueline Bisset.

== Life ==
Born in 1942 in Freeport, Illinois, Smith grew up in Bloomington, Illinois and was the son of Methodist minister Charles Merrill Smith. He married journalist Harriet Hahn on March 20, 1971, in Middletown, New York. (Note: There are several places in New York that are or were known as Middletown. The source does not indicate which one is meant.) The couple, who raised two daughters, moved to Colorado in 1980, where Smith worked as a state-certified drug and alcohol counselor at the rehabilitation centers Brockhurst Ranch and the ARK. He later worked as a courier for the Pikes Peak Library District.

While driving the library van on an icy road, Smith lost control of the vehicle and was hit by another car. He died of injuries related to the accident on December 7, 1988, at the age of 46.

== Literary career ==
=== The Thief Who Came to Dinner ===
Smith's best-known novel, The Thief Who Came to Dinner (1969) peaked at number seven on the list of national best-sellers. The novel tells the story of a computer programmer, Webster McGee, who quits his job to become a jewel thief.

In 1973, the novel was adapted into a movie by Director Bud Yorkin, starring Ryan O'Neal as McGee, and Jacqueline Bisset as McGee's accomplice and love interest, Laura Keane. Warren Oats played David Reilly, an insurance investigator.

Smith published The Devil and Webster Daniels, the sequel to The Thief Who Came to Dinner, in 1975.

=== Other works ===
In addition to The Thief Who Came to Dinner, Smith also co-wrote the three-book "Leo Roi" with his father under the pseudonym Phillips Lore, as well as several other standalone novels.

Smith's novel Yours Truly, from Hell follows a retired military general with psychic powers who travels to London in order to solve the mystery of Jack the Ripper.

Smith was a member of the Mystery Writers Guild of America.

=== Bibliography ===
- The Thief Who Came to Dinner
- The Looking Glass Murders
- Murder Behind Closed Doors
- Yours Truly, From Hell
- The Money War
- The Devil and Webster Daniels
- Grownups and Lovers
- Who Killed the Pie Man?
- Different Drums (1975; with Charles Merrill Smith)
