= CenterPoint Energy Plaza =

Skyscraper in Houston, Texas

CenterPoint Energy Tower
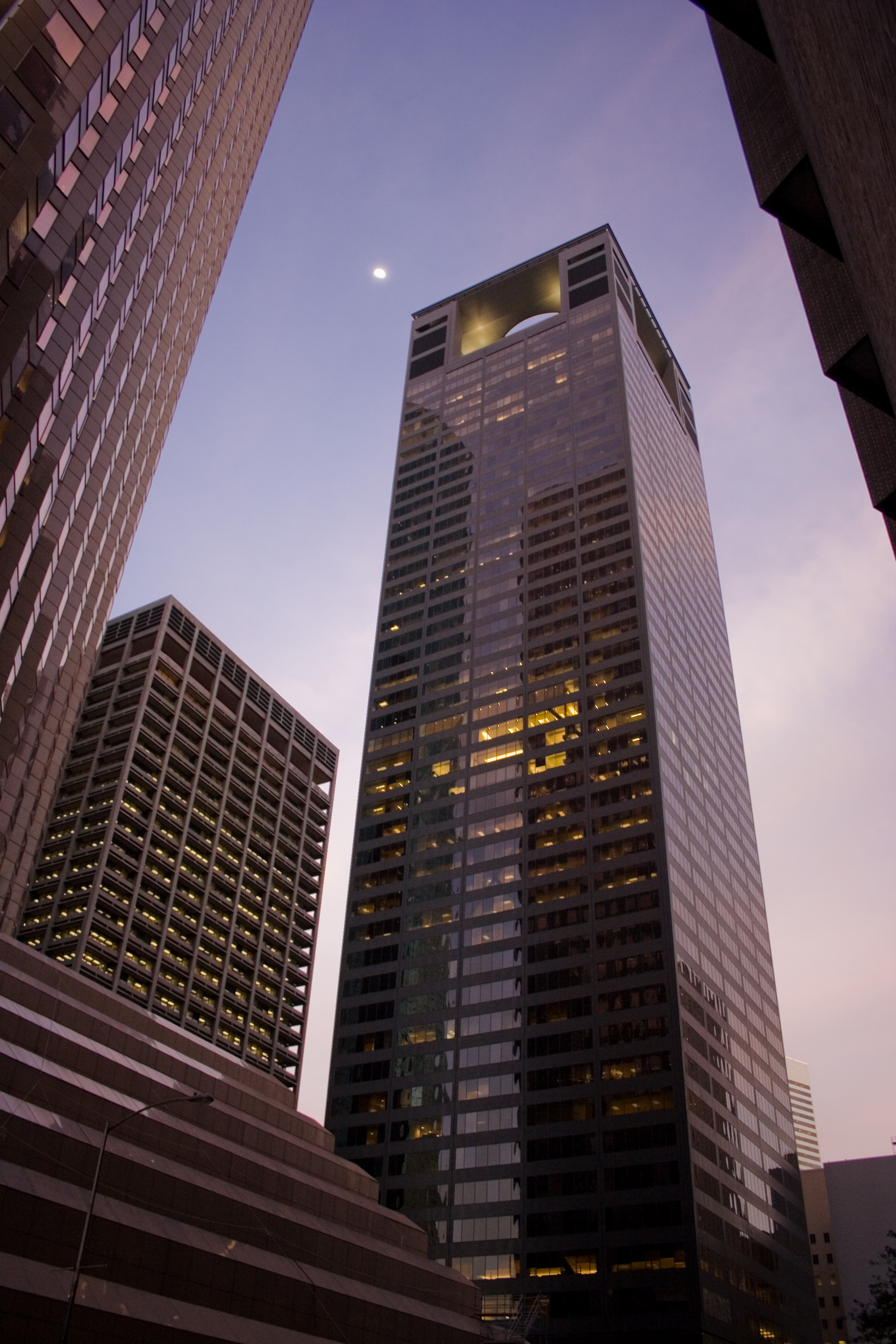
- Interactive map of the CenterPoint Energy Tower area

General information
- Status: Completed
- Type: Office
- Location: 1111 Louisiana St. Houston, Texas, United States
- Coordinates: 29.757214°N 95.367962°W
- Construction started: 1973; 53 years ago
- Completed: 1974; 52 years ago
- Opening: 1974; 52 years ago

Height
- Roof: 741 ft (226 m)

Technical details
- Floor count: 47
- Floor area: 1,399,986 ft^{2} (130,063.0 m^{2})

Design and construction
- Architects: Kendall/Heaton Associates, Inc.

CenterPoint Energy Tower (formerly Houston Industries Plaza) is a 741 feet (226 m) tall building in downtown Houston. The original building, finished in 1974, stood at 651 feet (198 m), but a 90-foot (27 m) extension was added as part of a 1996 renovation. Designed by Richard Keating, this renovation dramatically changed the building, the Houston Skyline and the downtown. Keating was also the designer of the nearby Wells Fargo Tower. It has the headquarters of CenterPoint Energy.

Historically the building housed the headquarters of Houston Industries (HI) and subsidiary Houston Lighting & Power (HL&P). In 1999 Houston Industries changed its name to Reliant Energy. When Reliant Energy moved out of the building and moved into the new Reliant Energy Plaza in 2003, the company left over 400,000 square feet (37,000 m^{2}) of space vacant.

Around 1995 the building owners added a circle-shaped canopy that is five stories tall, due to a business competitor down the street having a building taller than theirs. Clifford Pugh of the Houston Chronicle wrote that "It was meant to resemble a lantern, but at night the lit open space looks more like a hovering spaceship."

== Gallery ==
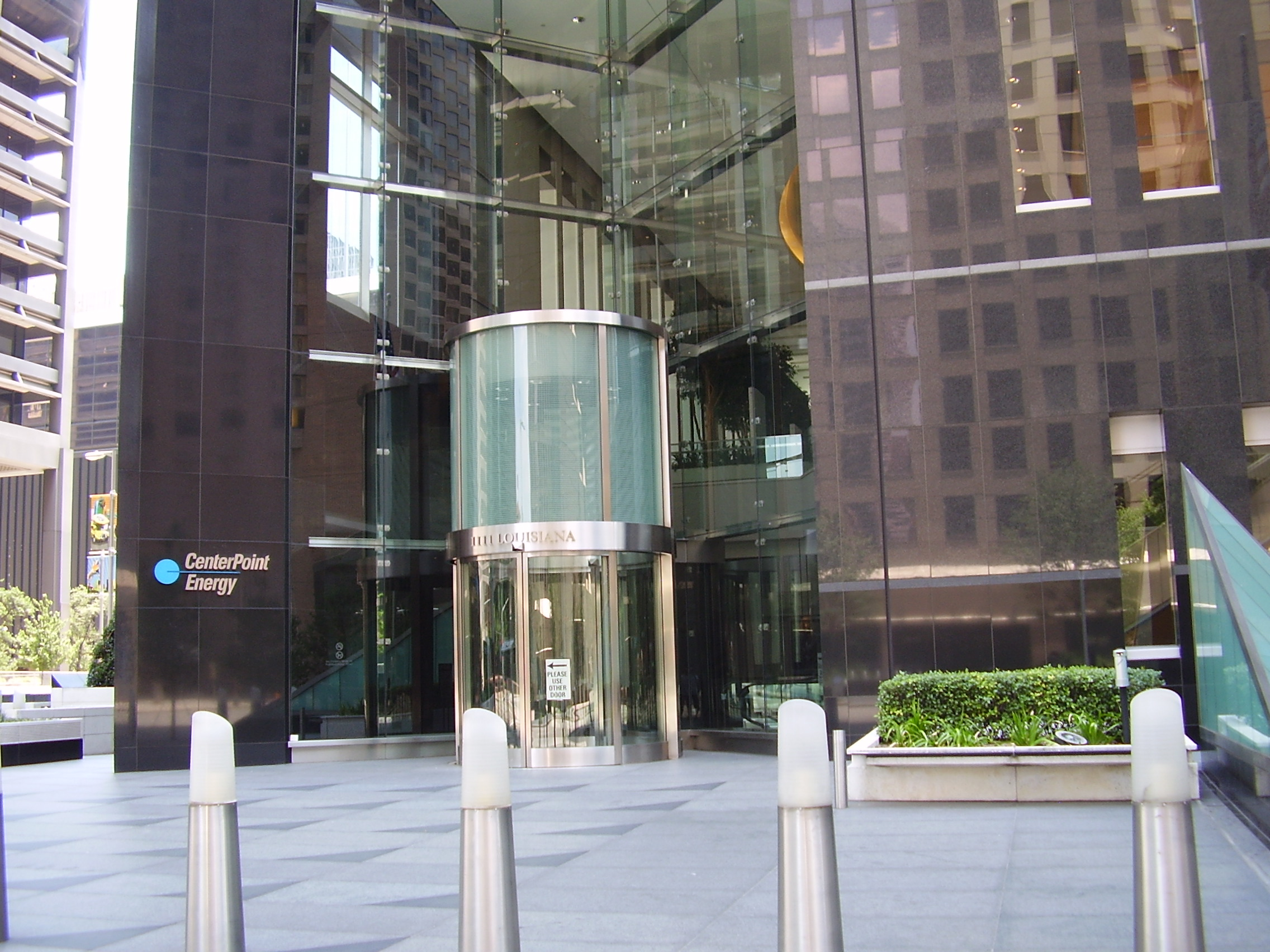
Entrance to CenterPoint Energy Tower

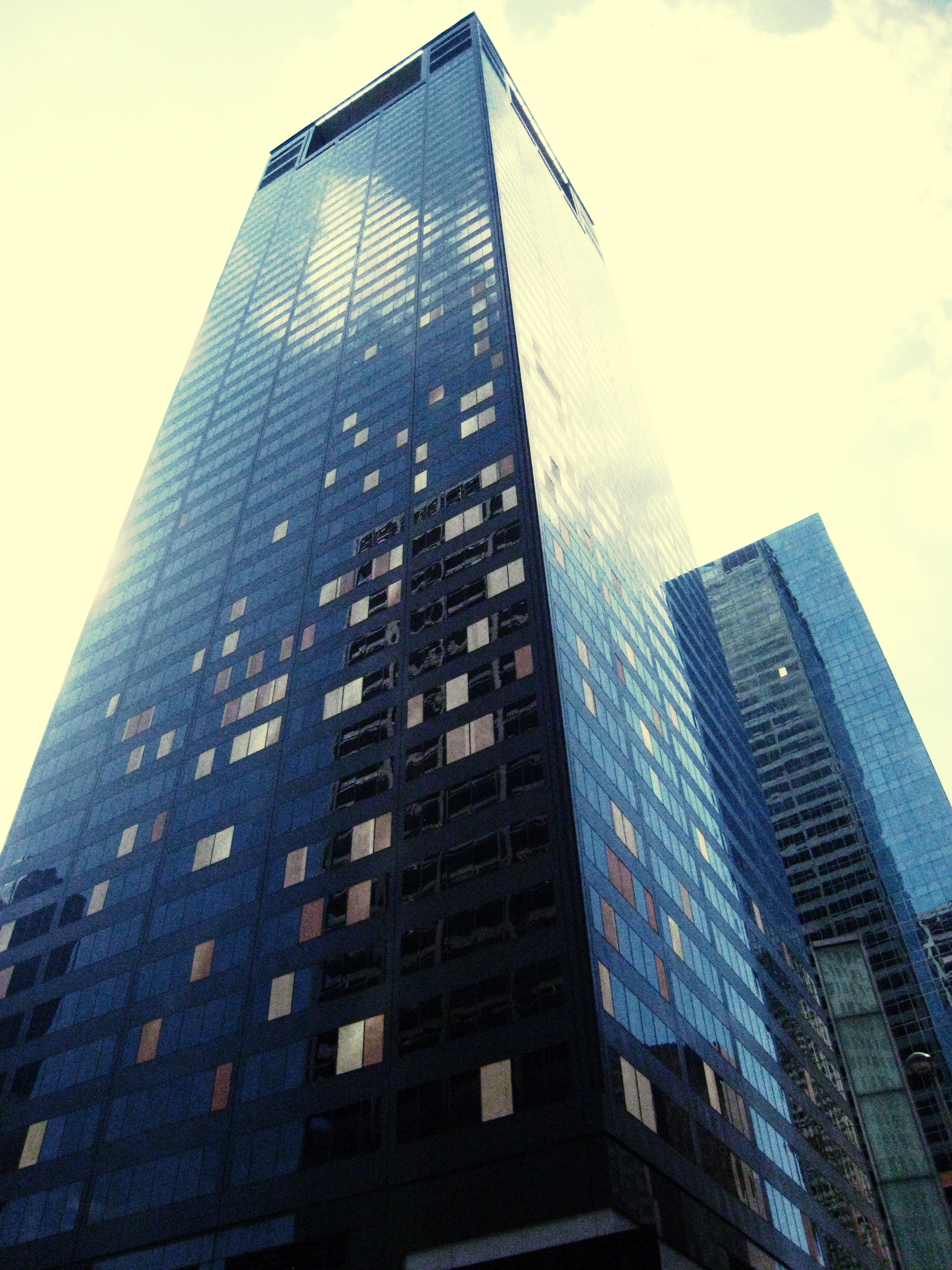
Damage to windows from Hurricane Ike in 2008

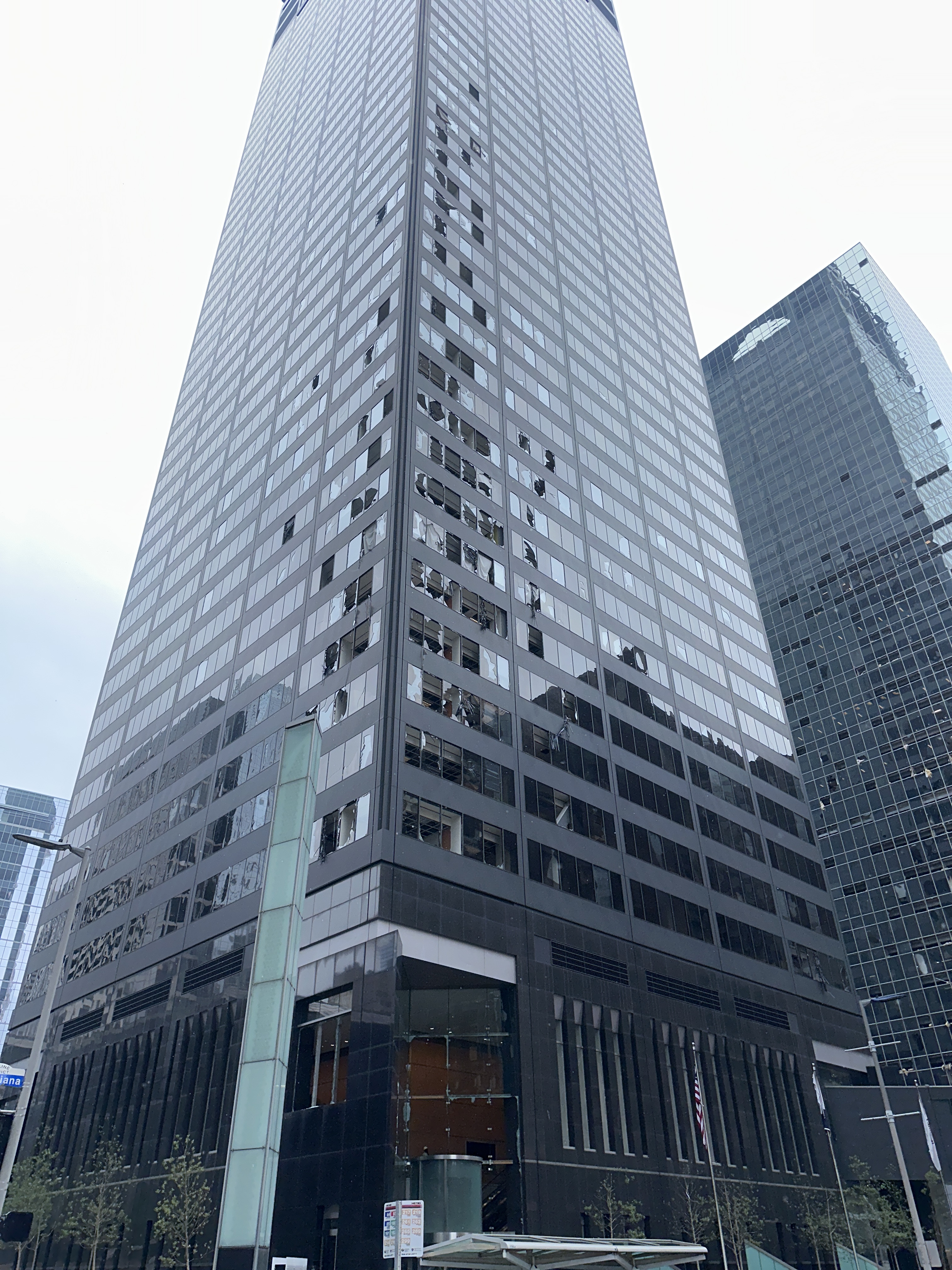
Damage to windows from the 2024 Houston derecho

== See also ==
- List of tallest buildings in Houston
- List of tallest buildings in Texas
- List of tallest buildings in the United States
