= The Thief Who Came to Dinner =

1973 film by Bud Yorkin

- Theatrical release poster
- Directed by: Bud Yorkin
- Screenplay by: Walter Hill
- Based on: The Thief Who Came to Dinner; 1971 novel by Terrence Lore Smith
- Produced by: Norman Lear; Bud Yorkin
- Starring: Ryan O'Neal; Jacqueline Bisset; Warren Oates
- Cinematography: Philip H. Lathrop
- Edited by: John Horger
- Music by: Henry Mancini
- Production company: Bud Yorkin Productions
- Distributed by: Warner Bros.
- Release date: March 1, 1973
- Running time: 104 minutes
- Country: United States
- Language: English
- Box office: $1.7 million (US/ Canada rentals)

The Thief Who Came to Dinner is a 1973 American comedy film directed by Bud Yorkin. Based on the novel by Terrence Lore Smith, the film stars Ryan O'Neal and Jacqueline Bisset, with Charles Cioffi, Warren Oates, Austin Pendleton, Ned Beatty, Michael Murphy and, in an early screen appearance, Jill Clayburgh.

== Plot ==
Webster McGee is a divorced computer programmer who abruptly quits his job and adopts a life of crime as a burglar and jewel thief in Houston, Texas. Leaving behind chess pieces and notes containing chess moves as a calling card, he becomes dubbed by the media as "The Chess Burglar".

For his first job, he robs rich businessman Henderling, stealing from him not only money but also files with information that could destroy Henderling's career. Webster uses these files to blackmail Henderling. Instead of money, he asks for introduction into high society — aiming to find a way to rob other rich houses.

Webster soon meets Laura at a society function hosted by Henderling. She and Webster fall in love, and she helps him to burglarize several other members of Houston society.

Texas Mutual Insurance investigator Dave Reilly becomes suspicious of, then certain that Webster is the jewel thief, but cannot find any actual proof. In the course of the investigation, Dave and Webster develop a mutual respect that grows into a sort of friendship. As Webster prepares for his biggest heist yet, Dave must decide whether to be loyal to his job or his new friend.

== Cast ==
- Ryan O'Neal as Webster McGee
- Jacqueline Bisset as Laura Keaton
- Warren Oates as Dave Reilly
- Jill Clayburgh as Jackie Johnson
- Charles Cioffi as Gene Henderling
- Ned Beatty as Deams
- Austin Pendleton as Zukovsky
- Gregory Sierra as Hector aka "Dynamite"
- Michael Murphy as Ted
- John Hillerman as Lasker
- Alan Oppenheimer as Insurance Man
- Margaret Fairchild as Mrs. Donner
- Jack Manning as Tom Preston
- Richard O'Brien as Sergeant Del Conte
- George Morfogen as Rivera

== Production ==
In November 1970 it was announced Yorkin and Lear's Tandem Productions had bought the rights to the novel and would make it in association with Warner Bros. Yorkin later said the wanted to make the film as a tribute to "that great Cary Grant escape period".

Oliver Hailey wrote the first draft of the script. The novel was published in March 1971 and the New York Times said "there is something engaging about all this nonsense."

Walter Hill was hired to write a number of subsequent drafts, and received sole credit.

The casting of Warren Oates and Ryan O'Neal was announced in December 1971. Charlotte Rampling was originally announced as the female lead. Rampling became pregnant and was replaced by Jacqueline Bisset.

Filming took place on location in Houston. Locations included the Johnson Space Center, the Astrodome, the Museum of Fine Arts, Rice University, the Mecom Fountain, Jones Hall, the Alley Theatre, River Oaks, Buffalo Bayou, West University Place, Montrose, Fourth Ward, the Bob Lanier Public Works Building, the El Paso Energy Building, St. Vincent De Paul Catholic Church, the former Houston Independent School District (HISD) headquarters, the former Trail Drive-In, and an area by the Houston Ship Channel.

During filming, Yorkin and Lear had the number one, two and four show in the country (All in the Family, Sanford and Son and Maude). "I don't think it's the greatest picture in the world but it is very entertaining," said Yorkin.

Bisset later admitted her role in the film was "undeveloped" and said she had some qualms about the morality of the movie. "I think stealing is dishonest. But it's only a movie." However, she enjoyed shooting in Houston saying "I thought it would be ghastly. But the people were so terribly nice to us. Their houses were just unreal."

== Reception ==
Walter Hill later said "Warren Oates was very good in the movie – better than the movie was. They cut a lot of things of his out of the movie they shouldn't have."

The Los Angeles Times wrote that the film was "as amusing to watch as it is disturbing to think about afterwards" and that O'Neal and Bisset made "a terrific team".

O'Neal later listed the film as among those he said he should not have done.
