= Texas Genco =

- Industry: Power and utilities
- Founded: 2001
- Defunct: 2005
- Fate: Acquired by NRG Energy

Texas Genco was a power generation company that came about as part of the deregulated Texas electricity market and owned numerous power plants in the Houston area that serve area power needs. The Company was created in 2001 as part of the Texas electricity market deregulation. Incumbent utilities were required to separate their business functions into a retail electric provider (REP), a transmission and distribution service provider (TDSP), and a wholesale generator.

In 2000, Reliant Energy announced that it was splitting its business into separate regulated and unregulated businesses. This split formed Reliant Resources, an unregulated electricity and energy company, and Centerpoint Energy, the remaining mostly regulated energy delivery company. Reliant Energy's power plants became a wholly owned subsidiary of Centerpoint Energy. The new company was known as Texas Genco.

When the state of Texas deregulated the electricity market, the former Houston Lighting & Power (HL&P) was split into several companies. In 2003 HL&P was split into Reliant Energy, Texas Genco, and CenterPoint Energy.

Seeking opportunities arising out of the deregulation of the electricity industry in Texas, in late 2004 four private equity firms—the Texas Pacific Group, the Blackstone Group, Kohlberg Kravis Roberts, and Hellman & Friedman of San Francisco—combined forces to purchase Texas Genco from the transmission & distribution provider utility Centerpoint Energy for Houston.

This coalition of firms acquired Texas Genco—which was the second largest operator of power generation facilities in the state—for a price of approximately $1.9 billion—using just $900 million in cash.

In late 2005, these private equity firms announced the sale of Texas Genco to NRG Energy of Princeton, N.J., for a price of roughly $5.9 billion. The investors achieved a gain of almost $5 billion over the space of an investment holding period of less than 18 months, a return that will mark one of the most lucrative private equity investments in recent years.

== See also ==
- Genco
