= Middletown, New York (disambiguation) =

Middletown is the name of several places located in the U.S. state of New York:

- Middletown, Delaware County, New York, a town
- Middletown, Orange County, New York, a city
- Middletown, Rockland County, New York, a former hamlet in the Town of Orangetown
- Middletown, Staten Island, a former incorporated town in Richmond County, New York
- Middletown (New Rochelle), a former hamlet in the Town of New Rochelle in Westchester County
