= 2024 Houston derecho =

Windstorm affecting the U.S. Gulf Coast

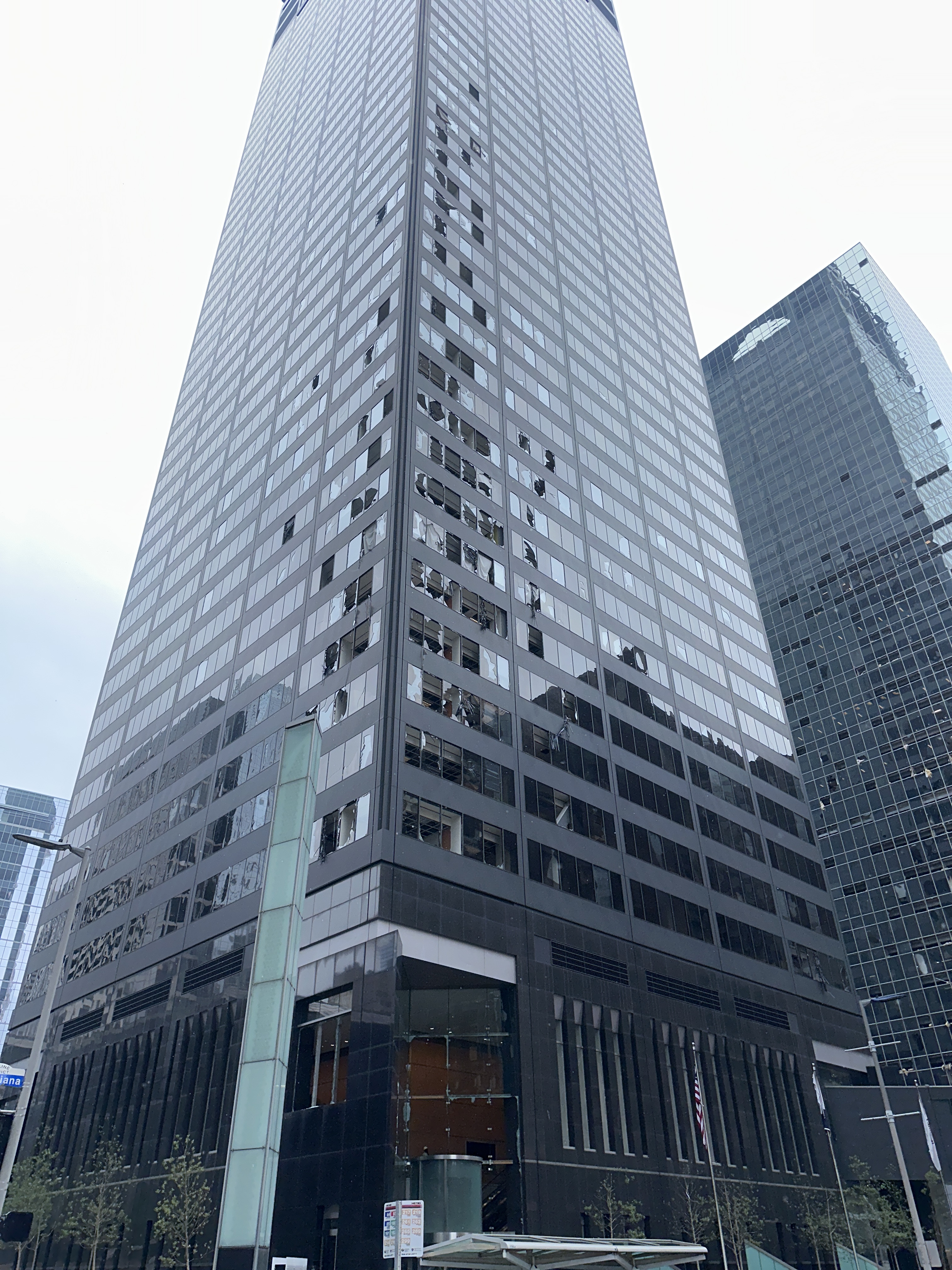
- Windows blown out of CenterPoint Energy Plaza in Houston
- Date(s): May 16, 2024
- Peak wind gust (measured): 78 mph (126 km/h; 34.9 m/s) (Highlands, Texas)
- Peak wind gust (est.): 100 mph (161 km/h; 44.7 m/s) (Houston, Texas)
- Tornado count: 4 (Texas, Louisiana)
- Fatalities: 8
- Damage costs: $1.2 billion (2024 USD)
- Areas affected: Southeast Texas, Louisiana, Southern Mississippi, Southern Alabama, Florida
- Severest impact: Greater Houston

From the evening of May 16, 2024, to midday May 17, 2024, a derecho struck the Gulf Coast of the United States from Southeast Texas to Florida, causing widespread damage, particularly in the city of Houston and surrounding metropolitan area. At least seven people were killed by the storms, dubbed the Houston derecho by the National Weather Service, which brought winds up to 100 miles per hour (160 km/h) along with four tornadoes.

== Meteorological synopsis ==
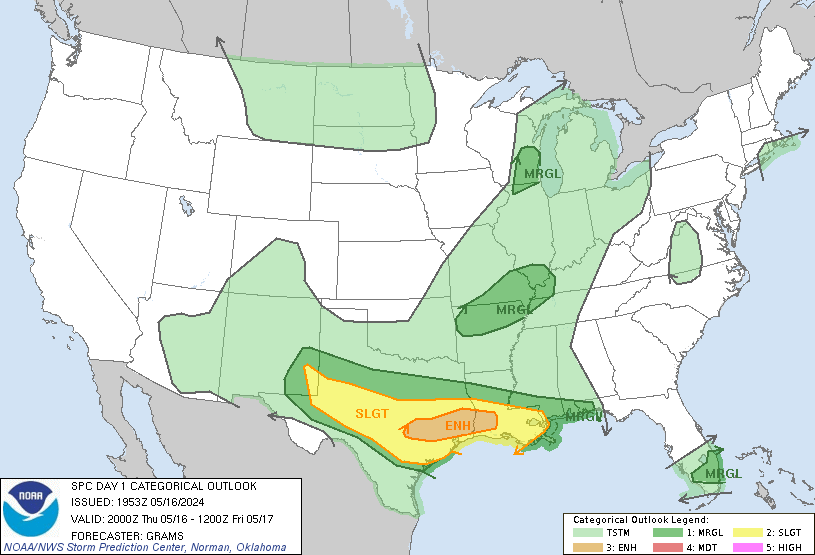
SPC's Day 1 convective outlook for May 16, 2024, issued at 2000Z, indicating an enhanced risk for severe weather from southeast Texas into southwest Louisiana.

On May 14, the Storm Prediction Center (SPC) outlined a level 2/Slight risk for severe weather across portions of central and northern Texas. This risk area was zonally extended westward to the Texas–New Mexico border and eastward into southern Mississippi the following day. By the morning of May 16, a level 3/Enhanced risk was delineated across central Texas, extending southward and eastward toward the Texas and Louisiana gulf coasts during the afternoon hours. Convective activity was already ongoing by the time of these outlooks, focused along and north of an outflow boundary from Midland into northeastern Texas. The environment south of these storms was characterized by rich low-level moisture and rapidly cooling temperatures with height, contributing to mixed-layer convective available potential energy values at or above 3,000 J/kg, indicative of a very unstable environment. Farther east across southeastern Texas and southwestern Louisiana, a greater surge of moisture began to advect with a northward-moving warm front bringing dewpoints as high as the upper-70s °F into the coastal counties. Forecasters believed that not only would thunderstorms develop along the frontal boundary, but also that the front may act to intensify the pre-existing line of storms approaching from the west.

By mid-afternoon, an expansive mesoscale convective system evolved across much of central and eastern Texas, exhibiting numerous updrafts and an increasing potential for extensive damaging winds. As this complex surged southeastward and rotations were spotted on Weather Radar leading to an increase in tornado warnings as it evolved into a derecho—a particularly long-lived and widespread damaging wind event—as it moved into the Greater Houston metropolitan area. While the highest wind gust recorded by an anemometer reached 78 mph (126 km/h), post-storm damage surveys conducted by the local National Weather Service office estimated that winds reaching 100 mph (160 km/h) moved through portions of the downtown area. Three EF1 tornadoes accompanied this activity. The derecho maintained vigor as it continued eastward into Louisiana during the evening hours, fueled by continued transport of warm air from the south. Isolated hurricane-force wind gusts were recorded, including an 84 mph (135 km/h) gust at the New Orleans Lakefront Airport. Another EF1 tornado was confirmed in Romeville. By the pre-dawn hours of May 17, this convective line progressed offshore into the Gulf of Mexico, with instability confined to the immediate coastline. As such, the threat of inland severe weather decreased, leaving behind widespread damaging wind reports across portions of the Gulf Coast states.

== Impact and damage ==
=== Texas ===
==== Greater Houston ====
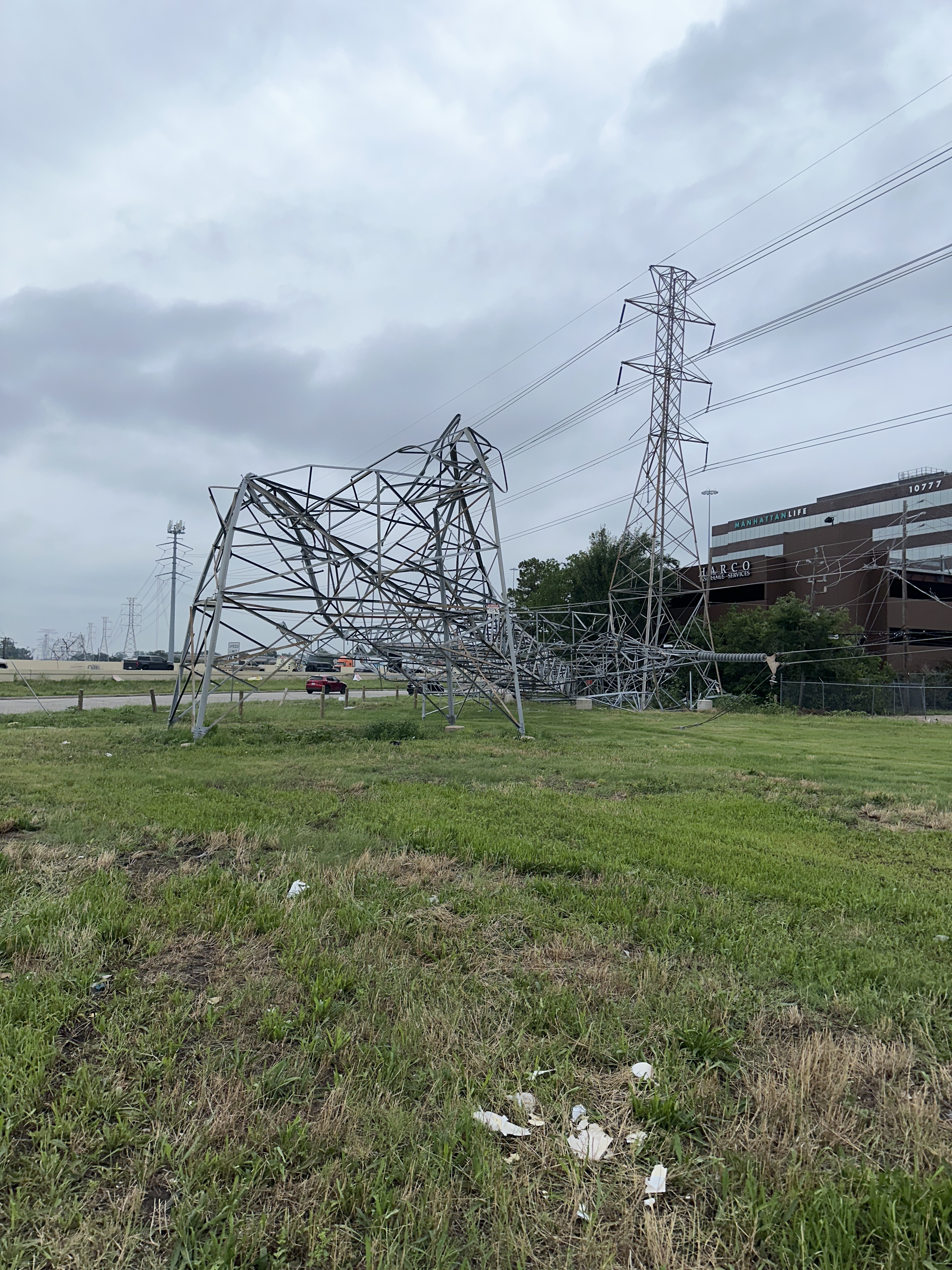
Straight-line wind damage inflicted transmission towers in Houston, Texas.

As the derecho moved through the Greater Houston area, it produced wind gusts of up to 100 mph (161 km/h) in Downtown Houston. The derecho was considered the worst damaging wind event to affect Houston in nearly 25 years. The strong winds in Downtown Houston blew out the windows of many high-rise buildings in the area, littering the streets below with broken glass. A brick building occupied by a bar near the intersection of Congress Street and Travis Street suffered the collapse of a wall. The derecho caused extensive damage to transmission lines along with widespread straight-line damage and more than a million customers lost power in the Greater Houston area and nearby counties as a result of the high winds. More than 24 hours later, almost 555,000 customers still remained without power, and by Wednesday of the following week, when repairs were initially expected to be finished, nearly 60,000 homes, businesses, and schools in the worst hit areas of the city were still without power.

Seven people were confirmed to have died in Greater Houston as a result of the storm; the number of deaths was later revised to eight.

Elsewhere in Texas outside of Houston, much of east Texas experienced floods.

=== Louisiana ===
In the Baton Rouge, Louisiana area, numerous trees and power lines were downed, some of which landed on homes and cars. However, no injuries were reported. As the derecho moved into the New Orleans area, it produced winds of more than 80 mph (128 km/h). Tornado warnings were issued in St. John the Baptist and St. Charles parishes as the storms passed through. The strong winds overturned three mobile homes at the New Orleans RV Resort and Marina, resulting in the hospitalization of four people. Small aircraft and equipment at the Louis Armstrong New Orleans International Airport were damaged. Minor street flooding and downed trees were reported in Covington. Downed trees blocked a lane of US 90 near Live Oak, leaving only a single lane passable to traffic. More than 65,000 customers lost power in Southeast Louisiana as a result of the high winds.

== Confirmed tornadoes ==
Confirmed tornadoes by Enhanced Fujita rating
EFU	EF0	EF1	EF2	EF3	EF4	EF5	Total
0	0	4	0	0	0	0	4

=== May 16 event ===
List of confirmed tornadoes – Thursday, May 16, 2024 (Note: All dates are based on the local time zone where the tornado touched down; however, all times are in Coordinated Universal Time for consistency.)
EF#	Location	County / Parish	State	Start Coord.	Time (UTC)	Path length	Max width
EF1	SW of Waller	Waller	TX	29.989°N 95.9947°W	22:44–22:45	0.71 mi (1.14 km)	100 yd (91 m)
EF1	A large metal barn was destroyed, with debris tossed 1,000 yd (910 m). Trailers were rolled, and trees were downed.						
EF1	Southern Cypress (1st tornado)	Harris	TX	29.9274°N 95.7444°W	23:04–23:05	0.58 mi (0.93 km)	75 yd (69 m)
EF1	A high-end EF1 severely damaged three houses.						
EF1	Southern Cypress (2nd tornado)	Harris	TX	29.9232°N 95.7019°W	23:08–23:10	1.44 mi (2.32 km)	100 yd (91 m)
EF1	Numerous homes sustained roof damage and broken windows. Damage was also noted at the Lone Star College-CyFair campus.						
EF1	Romeville	St. James	LA	30.07°N 90.89°W	03:46–03:52	4.83 mi (7.77 km)	120 yd (110 m)
EF1	A tornado moved through Romeville, damaging the roofs of several frame houses and manufactured homes, snapping power poles, and snapping trees.						

== See also ==
- List of natural disasters in the United States
- List of derecho events
- List of North American tornadoes and tornado outbreaks
- Tornadoes of 2024
- Weather of 2024
- May 2009 derecho series
