= Houston Lighting & Power =

Texas power and utility company

- Type: Subsidiary
- Traded as: NYSE: HOU (Houston Industries)
- Industry: Utilities
- Founded: 1882
- Defunct: 2003 (split into Reliant Energy, Texas Genco, and CenterPoint Energy)
- Fate: Defunct
- Successor: Reliant Energy, Texas Genco, CenterPoint Energy
- Headquarters: Houston, Texas, U.S., United States
- Area served: Greater Houston, Texas
- Products: Electricity, utility services
- Owner: Houston Industries (later Reliant Energy)
- Parent: Houston Industries (later Reliant Energy)

Houston Lighting & Power Co. (HL&P), later named Reliant Energy HL&P/Entex, was the single power and utility company that served Greater Houston of the U.S. state of Texas. It was a subsidiary of Houston Industries (HI, NYSE: HOU), which later was renamed to Reliant Energy (REI). HL&P had a service area of 5,000 square miles (13,000 km^{2}). In 1998 in terms of kilowatt-hour sales it was the tenth-largest energy company in the United States.

== History ==
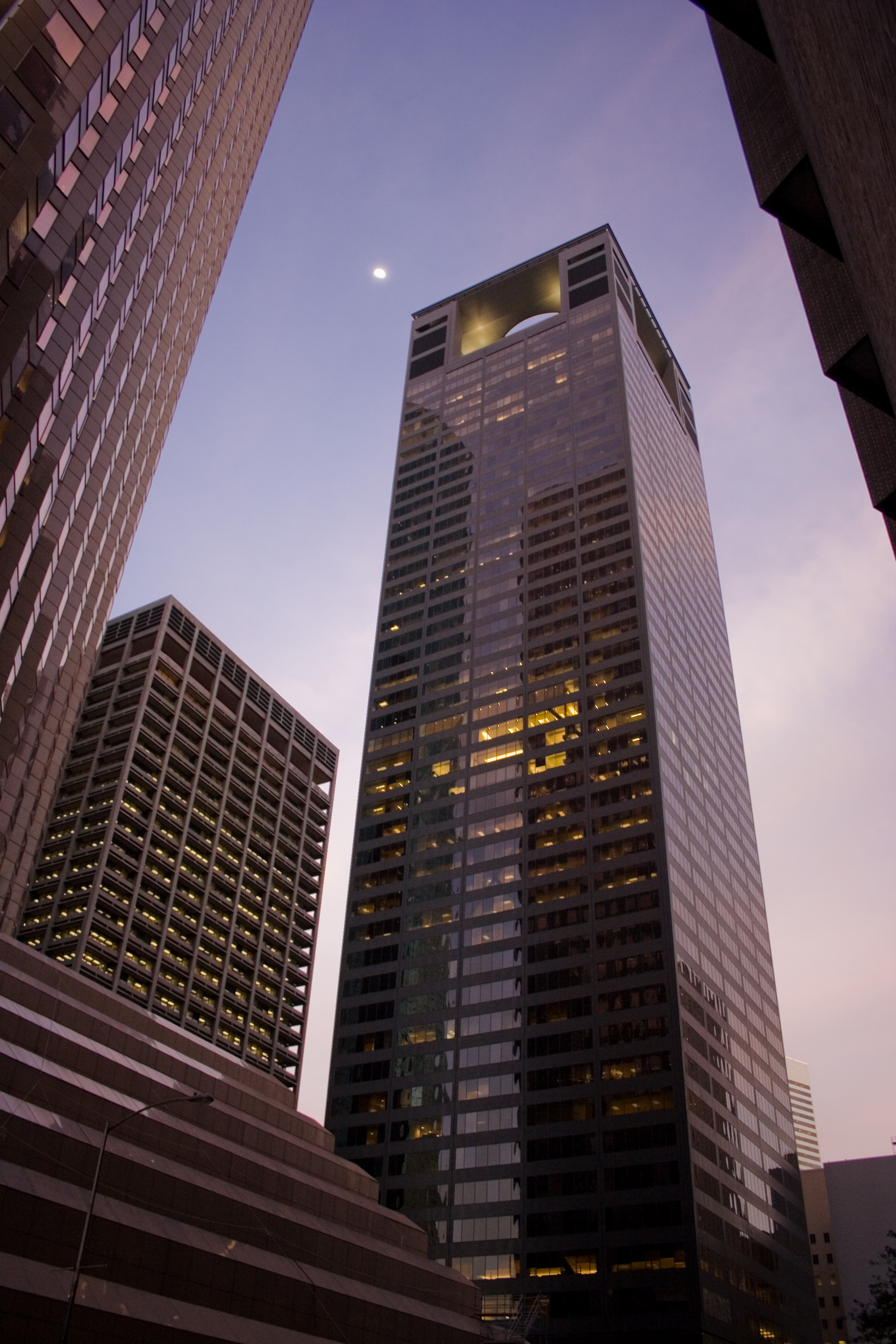
The CenterPoint Energy Plaza, previously the Houston Industries Building, once served as the company headquarters

It began operations in 1882.

In 1999 Houston Industries changed its name to Reliant Energy. Therefore HL&P was renamed Reliant Energy HL&P/Entex.

When the state of Texas deregulated the electricity market, HL&P was split into several companies. In 2003 the company was split into Reliant Energy, Texas Genco, and CenterPoint Energy. Texas Genco assumed control of the area's power plants. CenterPoint assumed control of the poles and power lines. Reliant Energy took over the sales of electricity to businesses and individuals.

== Offices ==
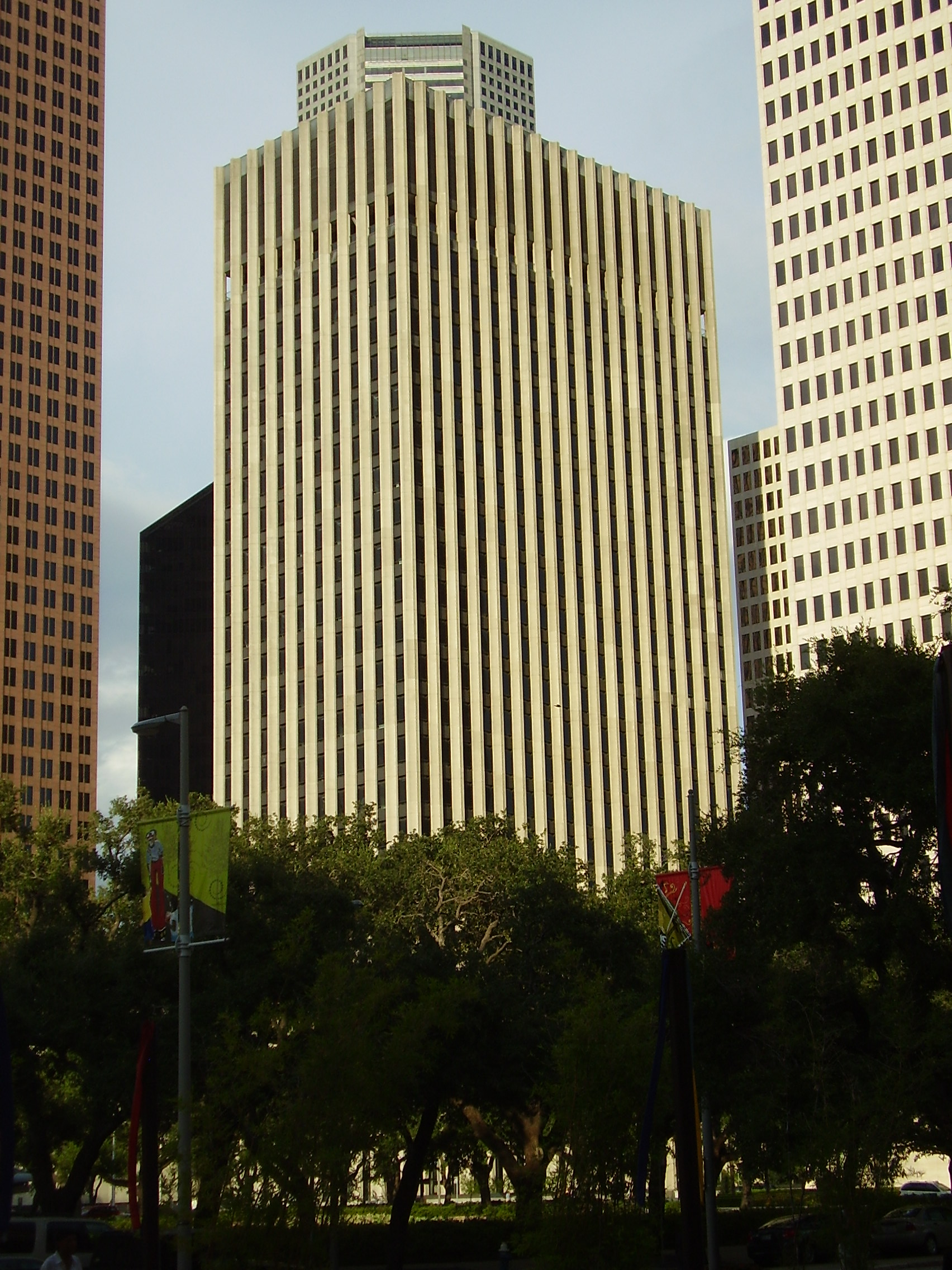
The Bob Lanier Public Works Building was previously the Energy Building, the HL&P headquarters

Before the dissolution of the company, its headquarters were shared with Houston Industries in the Houston Industries Plaza, now the CenterPoint Energy Plaza in Downtown Houston.

The Bob Lanier Public Works Building in Downtown Houston, formerly the Electric Building, was previously the HL&P office building. In 1999 the City of Houston, which had acquired the building, renovated it for $43 million to house city government offices.
