= 1000 Main =

Skyscraper located in Houston Texas

1000 Main (formerly Reliant Energy Plaza)
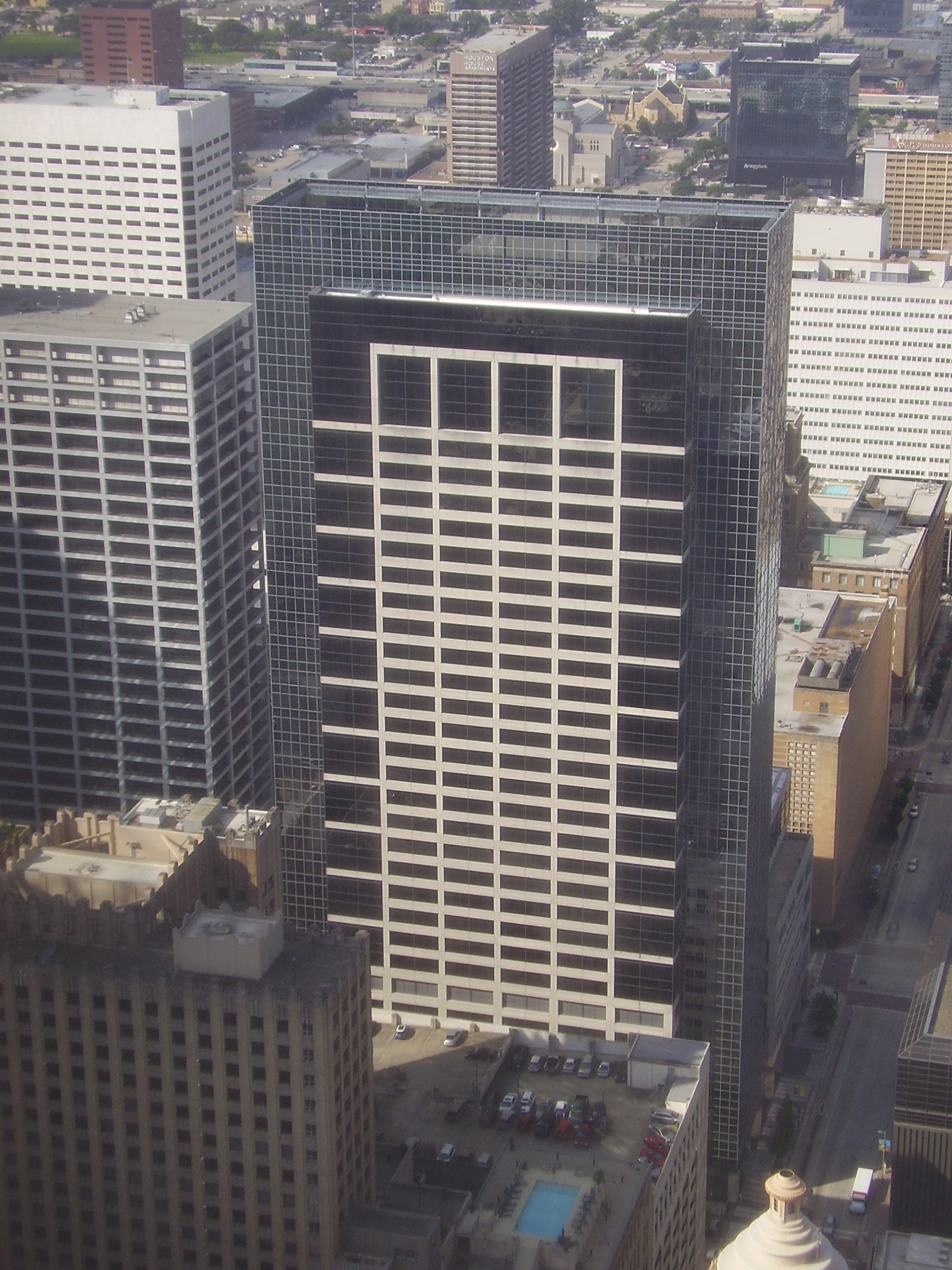
- Interactive map of the 1000 Main (formerly Reliant Energy Plaza) area

General information
- Status: Completed
- Location: 1000 Main Street, Houston, Texas
- Coordinates: 29.7568°N 95.3656°W
- Construction started: 2001
- Completed: 2003

Height
- Roof: 518 ft (158 m)

Technical details
- Floor count: 36
- Floor area: 130,063 m^{2} (1,399,990 sq ft)
- Lifts/elevators: 20

Design and construction
- Architect: Gensler Associates Ltd.

1000 Main, formerly Reliant Energy Plaza, is a 518-foot (158 m) tall skyscraper in Downtown Houston, Texas managed by Transwestern. It houses the headquarters of GenOn Energy, and the building has around 800,000 square feet (74,000 m^{2}) of space.

1000 Main was constructed from 2001 to 2003 and has 36 floors. It is the 25th tallest building in Houston. It is made out of glass, steel, and concrete. Lights atop the building and on the main street side flash in patterns of various colors at night. This building occupies the site where the Lamar Hotel stood before it was demolished in 1985. A two-level trading floor with 30 ft high ceilings, currently leased by the trading arm of Shell plc, is located on the 10th and 11th floors. It is squeezed between the garage and the office tower. Century development built the Reliant Energy Plaza. In 2003 Reliant Energy occupied more than 500,000 square feet (46,000 m^{2}) of space in the building. During the same year two subsidiaries of Marsh & McLennan Companies, Marsh USA and Mercer Human Resource Consulting, had a combined 105,000 square feet (9,800 m^{2}) of space in the building. The Reliant Energy Plaza was 86% leased in 2003.

== Gallery ==
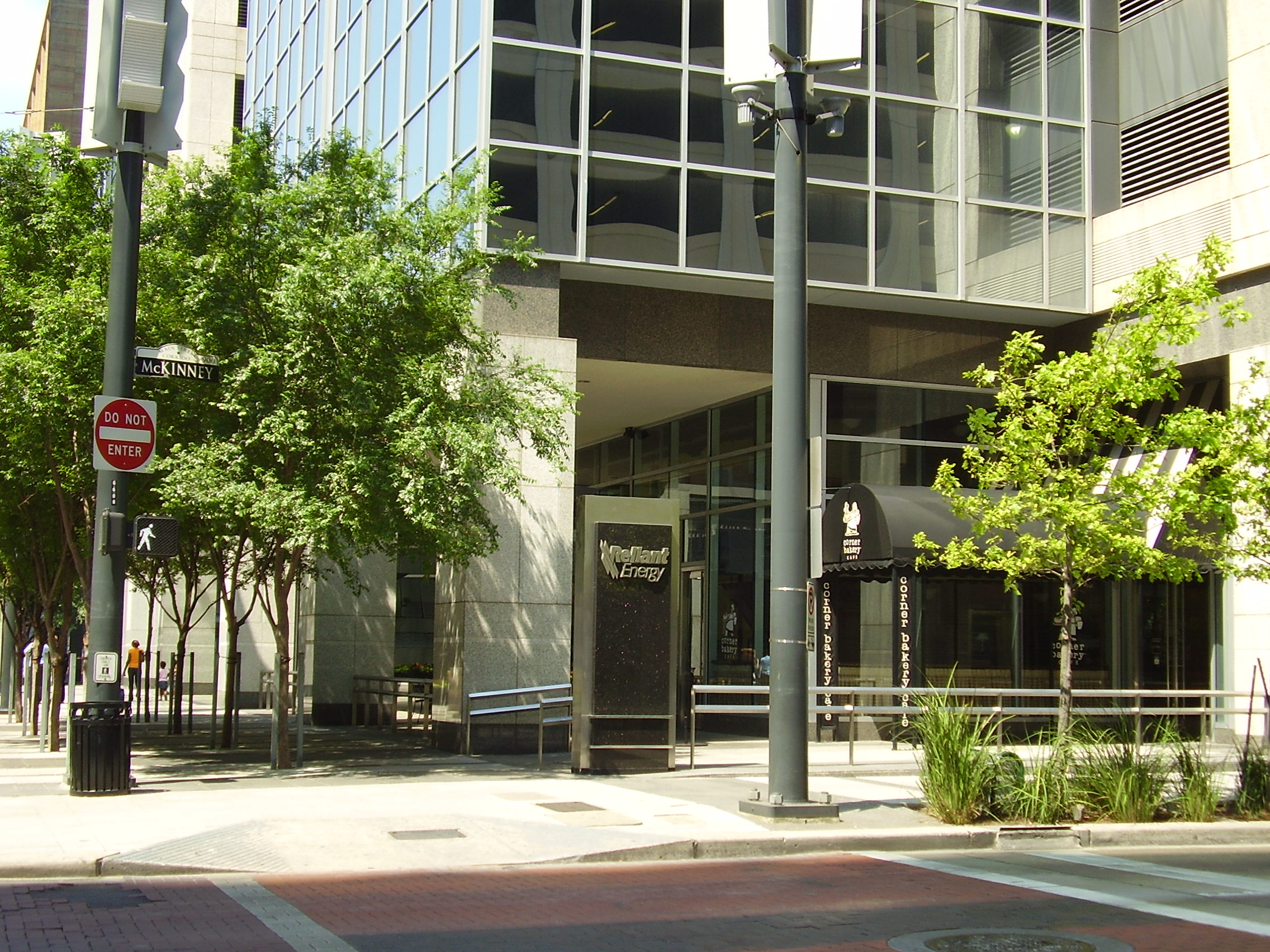
Base of the Reliant Energy Plaza

== See also ==
- List of tallest buildings in Houston
