= Bob Lanier Public Works Building =

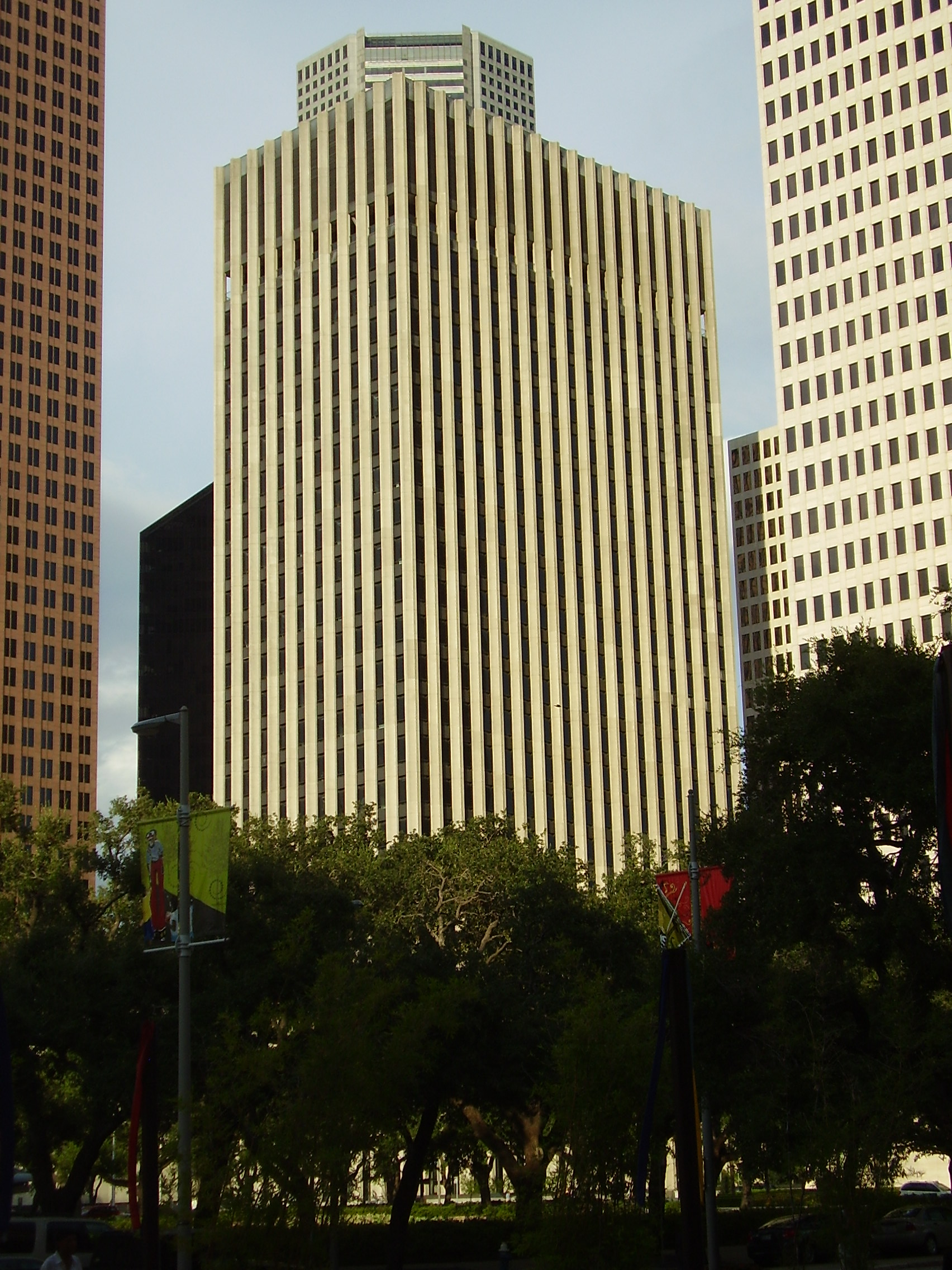
- Interactive map of the Bob Lanier Public Works Building area

General information
- Type: Office
- Location: 611 Walker Avenue, Houston, Texas
- Coordinates: 29.75983°N 95.36715°W
- Completed: 1968

Height
- Roof: 410 ft (125 m)

Technical details
- Floor count: 27
- Floor area: 767,000 ft^{2} (71,300 m^{2})

Design and construction
- Architect: Robert O Biering

Bob Lanier Public Works Building is a 410 ft (125 m) tall skyscraper in Houston, Texas. It was completed in 1968 and has 27 floors. It is the 41st tallest building in the city. Eero Saarinen's CBS Building in New York City inspired the design for this building. It was named after Houston mayor Bob Lanier who served between 1992 and 1998.

The building is located one block from Houston City Hall and Hermann Square. It is bounded by Louisiana, Rusk, Smith, and Walker Streets.

== History ==
The Rice Hotel Family Laundry formerly stood where the Lanier building is today.

This building was previously the Houston Lighting & Power office building. In 1999 the City of Houston, which had acquired the building, renovated it for $43 million to house city government offices. It was previously known as the Electric Building.

The renovation occurred under the direction of Mayor Lanier.

== Departments ==
The main office of Houston Public Works is in the Lanier Building. Divisions of the Mayor's Office at the Lanier Building include 3-1-1 (5th Floor) and Office of Business Opportunity (7th Floor).

== See also ==
- List of tallest buildings in Houston
