= Middletown (New Rochelle) =

Former hamlet in New York, United States

Coordinates: 40°55′58″N 73°47′28″W

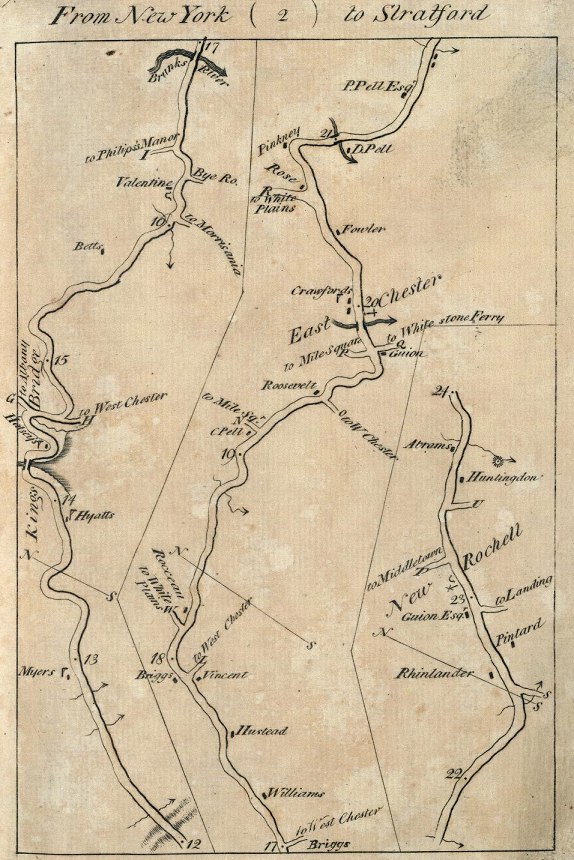

Middletown is a former hamlet of the Town of New Rochelle in Westchester County, New York.

== History ==
=== Origin and districts ===
The hamlet took shape in the central portion of New Rochelle, extended along North Avenue from the vicinity of Rochelle Park to the southerly boundary of the Wykagyl Country Club grounds. The origin of the name is traceable to a division of the town road districts. As early as 1747, there were two main districts: "upper" and "below". An increase in population after the Revolutionary War warranted the further subdivision of the town into five road districts in 1787. One was named "Middle" to distinguish it from the "Upper", "Waterside" and "Town" districts. By this time the district had become quite well built up so as to make the term "town" appropriate. Hence it became "Middletown". The name was so appropriate to the hamlet that it was indicated on road maps beginning in 1789.

=== Economy ===
There was at least one tavern in the hamlet, the Bayeux Tavern, which was located opposite the entrance to present day Paine Avenue. The tavern was of considerable importance to the community at the time. Just across the road was the farm and cottage of Thomas Paine. There were several minor industries in the hamlet as well. Jacob Coutant had a chair factory located west of North Avenue which was powered by water from Stephenson Brook which flowed into Huguenot Lake. A number of mechanics operated shops on their small farms, and in the vicinity of the present Fifth Avenue where the houses were quite close together.

=== Education ===
A school had been established just above the present Paine Avenue before the Revolution, and in 1809 it was removed to the junction of Eastchester Road. There being no public school law in the State of New York in force at the time, this new "Middle School" was erected by popular subscription pursuant to a resolution adopted by the citizens living within the hamlet, many of whom contributed the necessary labor, materials and financing. Upon the enactment of a new school law by the State in 1812 it was appropriated for a legalized public school for the hamlet. By 1815 the' Middle School District' boundaries were laid out, significantly extending the town limits of "Middletown".

=== Growth of New Rochelle ===
The school was removed out of the hamlet in 1829 to a new building on Mechanic Street, and, from that point on, the growth of the Village of New Rochelle along the Turnpike Road (now Main Street) came at the expense of other parts of the town. "Middletown" gradually lapsed back into a farming district.
