= Direct Energy =

North American retailer of energy and energy services

Direct Energy LP
- Type: Limited partnership
- Industry: Electricity retail, gas distribution
- Founded: 1986 in Toronto, Ontario, Canada
- Headquarters: Houston, Texas, United States
- Parent: NRG Energy
- Subsidiaries: Airtron; CPL Retail Energy; Direct Energy Business; First Choice Power; Home Warranty of America; WTU Retail Energy
- Website: www.directenergy.com

Direct Energy LP is a North American retailer of energy and energy services. The company was founded in Toronto in 1986 and now has more than four million customers in Canada and the United States. Direct Energy is a subsidiary of NRG Energy.

== History ==
Direct Energy was founded in Toronto in 1986, as a competitive energy retailer. In 2000, the company was acquired by Centrica, the UK-based parent of British energy retailer British Gas.

In 2010, Direct Energy acquired Clockwork Home Services making Direct Energy the largest energy and home services retailer in North America. Clockwork has three brands: One Hour Air Conditioning & Heating, Benjamin Franklin Plumbing and Mister Sparky, which specialize in plumbing, electrical and air-conditioning and heating and services, all of which have earned the Diamond Certified Award for excellent service.

Direct Energy acquired a number of upstream assets, including gas reserves and power generation facilities. These include: Quintana Minerals Resources, Bastrop Energy Center, Frontera Energy Center, Paris Energy Center, and Rockyview Energy Inc. Direct Energy has entered into long-term power purchase agreements for 813 MW of electricity from five wind farms in Texas.

Direct Energy owns and operates approximately 4,600 natural gas wells in Alberta, most recently acquiring natural gas assets from Suncor Energy and Shell Canada.

The company’s new strategy calls for increased investment in North America, specifically to grow its upstream asset cover to 35-40%; it also plans to grow its downstream businesses in its core markets of Texas, US North East and Canada. Chris Weston became President & CEO of Direct Energy on July 1, 2009 following the retirement of Deryk King.

Direct Energy announced in January 2012 that it will move its corporate headquarters from Toronto to Houston within the next 12 to 18 months. The headquarters will be in the Greenway Plaza location, where the company's residential energy and upstream business are now based.

In 2012, Iberdrola USA sold its energy services companies, Energetix and NYSEG Solutions, to Direct Energy.

In early 2014, Direct Energy partnered with Nest Labs to create a plan that would include a smart thermostat. The Nest smart thermostat will increase homeowners and renters ability to monitor the temperature of their homes for increased energy efficiency. In August 2014, Direct Energy increased their ability to provide services that increase the efficiency of the American and Canadian home when it announced its partnership with SmartThings. A SmartThing's Hub allows the user to connect with a smart device, secure the home with sensors, and control certain electrical devices.

In November 2015, the company acquired Israeli startup Panoramic Power, a manufacturer of circuit level wireless sensors that collect energy information, for $60M.

In July 2020, NRG Energy and Centrica entered an agreement under which NRG would acquire Direct Energy for $3.625 billion in an all-cash transaction. The merge was completed on January 5, 2021.

== Products and services ==
Direct Energy’s U.S. operations span 46 states and the District of Columbia including Texas, Ohio, Michigan, Illinois, Pennsylvania, California, Connecticut, Maryland, Rhode Island, Maine, New York, New Jersey, Delaware, Massachusetts, Florida, North Carolina, Kentucky, Indiana, Alabama, Oklahoma and Virginia. While not providing services to residential customers and businesses in Oklahoma, Direct Energy has established an Operations Center in Tulsa. In Canada, Direct Energy has operations in Ontario, Alberta, British Columbia, Manitoba, Quebec, Saskatchewan, Nova Scotia, Prince Edward Island, New Brunswick, and Newfoundland and Labrador.

Direct Energy is a regulated gas and electricity provider in Alberta, operating under the Direct Energy Regulated Services brand. It also offers deregulated service in the Province, operating as Direct Energy.

In South Texas, Direct Energy operates as CPL Retail Energy and CPL Business.

In West Texas, Direct Energy operates as WTU Retail Energy and WTU Business.

In Texas, additional brands of Direct Energy are First Choice Power, Bounce Energy.

== Deregulation position ==
Former CEO Chris Weston has given several speeches stating the need for deregulation of the energy market and the need for consumers to pay the actual price for energy rather than what he considers its current artificially low position. Weston spoke at KEMA’s 21st Executive Forum on the benefits of a competitive energy market and the value it has to consumers. He has also authored opinion pieces on the subject.

== Controversies ==
Sales employee oversight

May 2004 - Direct Energy was fined $157,500 CAD in 2003 after investigators discovered 25 of their sales agents were forging contracts to trap Ontario and US citizens into long-term energy contracts. After the forgeries committed by sales employees were discovered, Direct Energy president Paul Massara reported that "action [was taken to] deal with these issues and we've moved on a long way since that time."

May 2009 - Some Direct Energy sales people failed to make it clear to customers that they were signing up for unregulated energy rates. In order to prevent this issue from continuing, Direct Energy worked with the Service Alberta to train staff and implement practices that would prevent sales people from purposefully or accidentally misleading citizens about energy plans. The company was fined over $5,000 in penalties for the damages caused by the negligence. The Ontario government has since passed a bill that would require energy retailers to follow up on each contract sold to ensure the customer had willingly made the purchase which should allow energy companies to ensure that customers were not swayed by unethical sales pitches.

Water Heater Rental Contracts

In November 2012, Canada's Competition Bureau began looking into whether water heater rental companies were engaging in anti-competitive practices. Direct Energy, Reliance Home Comfort, and other water heater suppliers allegedly created contracts with high exit fees, long term contracts, and high buyout charges to make it difficult for customers to switch suppliers. The division of Direct Energy in question was subsequently sold and rebranded as Enercare.

Late Penalties

March 2014 - An Alberta judge has certified a class action lawsuit against Direct Energy alleging the company violated the Criminal Code and Canada's Interest Act. The lawsuit alleges Direct Energy's late payment penalties were effectively charging customers a 91 percent interest rate on late payments. The class action is still in process.

== See also ==
- Deregulation of the Texas electricity market
- Electric Reliability Council of Texas (ERCOT)
- Electricity policy of Ontario
- Universal Energy Corporation
