= Reliant Energy =

American energy company

Reliant Energy Retail Holdings, LLC
- Type: Subsidiary
- Industry: Electric utilities
- Founded: 2000; 26 years ago
- Headquarters: Houston, Texas
- Area served: Texas, US
- Key people: Elizabeth Killinger (president)
- Products: Electricity generation Electric power transmission distribution
- Parent: NRG Energy
- Website: www.reliant.com

Reliant Energy Retail Holding, LLC is an American energy company based in Houston, Texas. It serves the state of Texas.

== History ==
Headquartered in Houston, Texas, Reliant Energy, a subsidiary of NRG Energy, is one of the largest Texas electricity providers serving over 1.5 million Texans. Reliant provides over 23 million megawatts of power annually to residential and business customers.

Reliant Energy was founded in 2000. In June 2009, NRG Energy purchased Reliant Energy's retail electricity business. At the time, Reliant had 1.8 million customers and was the second largest electric provider in Texas. The name Reliant Energy was retained and the surviving wholesale business was renamed RRI Energy, which was retired in 2012 after additional NRG acquisitions.

In 2010, Reliant Energy received a $20 million grant from the U.S. Department of Energy as part of the DOE’s Recovery Act activities to fund a suite of Smart Grid products for upgrades of the nation’s electricity grid.

Over the last six months of 2017, the Public Utility Commission of Texas received a total of 118 complaints against Reliant including 22 slamming, and 2 cramming violations.

== Deregulation of electricity in Texas ==
On January 1, 2002, Texas deregulated the electricity industry and now there are 141 retail electric providers (REPs) currently doing business in the state. Texas is one of 18 states that offers some level of deregulated electricity, with the state having the largest percentage (approximately 85%) of residents who are able to choose their service provider.

With deregulation the transmission and distribution of the electricity is handled by Transmission and Distribution Utilities (TDUs) that must offer access to their wires to all REPs on a non-discriminatory basis.

Following the deregulation of the market, Reliant Energy began competing with other large energy companies in the state, including Direct Energy and TXU Corporation. Reliant Energy offers service to some of the largest cities in Texas including the Dallas/Fort Worth area in northeastern Texas, Houston and surrounding cities on the Gulf of Mexico including Corpus Christi and Galveston, and as far west as Midland.

== Renewable energy ==
Reliant Energy provides solar and wind turbine renewable energy options for its customers. The renewable energy options are only available in areas where the TDUs offer the service. Reliant provides sell back options for excess energy generated by an individual.

In June 2013, the City of Houston signed a renewable energy agreement with Reliant, as part of Houston’s dedication to improving energy efficiency and increasing the use of solar and wind power as energy sources. This deal included the purchase of 140 MW of wind energy output from 2013 to 2015.

== Legal and regulatory proceedings ==
In 2003, the U.S. Securities and Exchange Commission issued a settled cease-and-desist order against Reliant Resources, Inc. and Reliant Energy, Inc. related to “round trip” energy trades made between 1999 and 2001. According to the SEC, the trades generally produced no profit or loss but were designed to increase reported trading volumes and improve the companies’ rankings in energy-trading industry publications. The companies settled without admitting or denying the SEC’s findings.

Reliant was also named in legal actions arising from the California electricity crisis of 2000–2001. In April 2004, a federal grand jury indicted Reliant Energy Services, Inc. and four company officers or employees, alleging conspiracy, wire fraud, and commodities manipulation connected to California wholesale electricity prices. The U.S. Department of Justice said the indictment alleged that Reliant shut down four of five California power plants in June 2000, creating the appearance of a shortage and contributing to higher prices. The indictment contained allegations, and the defendants were presumed innocent unless proven guilty.

In August 2005, California Attorney General Bill Lockyer announced a $460 million settlement with Reliant Energy, Inc. to resolve claims that the company withheld power and manipulated electricity and natural-gas prices during the California energy crisis. The settlement included relief for California, Oregon, and Washington parties and followed earlier Federal Energy Regulatory Commission settlements. According to the California Attorney General’s office, the combined value of the Reliant settlements related to the crisis was $524.6 million.

More recent regulatory actions have involved Reliant-affiliated retail electric providers. In March 2021, the Pennsylvania Public Utility Commission approved a settlement with Reliant Energy Northeast LLC, also described by the commission as NRG Home, following an investigation into alleged unauthorized customer switching from in-person retail and event solicitations. Under the settlement, the company agreed to provide refunds to affected customers, continue quality-assurance monitoring, submit monthly complaint reports for one year, and pay a $175,000 civil penalty.

In 2024, the Public Utility Commission of Texas alleged that Reliant Energy Retail Services LLC failed to provide 701 monthly bills to 499 residential and small commercial customers between January 2022 and April 2023. Reporting on the settlement stated that Reliant agreed to pay a $50,100 administrative penalty and make a $20,000 bill-payment assistance donation to resolve the alleged violations.
