= Energy Future Holdings =

American utility company

Coordinates: 32.783139°N 96.799106°W

Energy Future Holdings Corporation
- Industry: Electric utility
- Founded: Dallas, Texas, United States in 1912
- Defunct: 2021
- Fate: Bankrupted
- Headquarters: Energy Plaza; Dallas, Texas, U.S.
- Products: Electricity generation Electric power distribution Electricity retailing

Energy Future Holdings Corporation was an electric utility company headquartered in Energy Plaza in Downtown Dallas, Texas, United States. The majority of the company's power generation was through coal and nuclear power plants. From 1998 to 2007, the company was known as TXU Corporation until its $45 billion leveraged buyout by KKR, TPG, and Goldman Sachs Alternatives. That purchase was the largest leveraged buyout in history. As of 2019, TXU Energy is a subsidiary of publicly traded Vistra Energy.

As of February 2013, the company has been described as "struggling" which resulted in the April 29, 2014 filing for bankruptcy protection under Title 11 of the United States Bankruptcy Code. On July 7, 2017, the company announced its Oncor transmission business would be acquired by Berkshire Hathaway for $9 billion but Sempra Energy's higher $9.45 billion bid was eventually accepted instead on August 21, 2017.

== History ==
The company traces its history to the beginnings of electric service in northern Texas. Predecessor companies include Dallas Power & Light (DP&L, founded 1917 with roots dating to 1882), which served the city of Dallas; Texas Electric Service Company (TESCO, founded 1929 with roots dating to 1885), which served Fort Worth and areas west of Abilene; and Texas Power and Light (TP&L, founded 1912), which served other areas of northern and west-central Texas. All three companies were owned by the Electric Bond and Share Company, a subsidiary of General Electric.

DP&L, TP&L and TESCO were connected by a single grid in 1932. The three companies were deemed to be an integrated system with the passage of the Public Utility Holding Company Act of 1935. In 1945, Texas Utilities was formed as a publicly owned holding company that owned DP&L, TP&L and TESCO. The three operating companies continued to operate separately until 1984, when they were merged into one operating company, called TU Electric ("TU" meaning "Texas Utilities"). Following acquisitions of The Energy Group plc for $10 billion in 1998 in the United Kingdom and a power generator in Australia, Texas Utilities became TXU, and was by 2000 the fifth largest energy company in the world, after its purchase of NORWEB from United Utilities and two municipal utility companies in Germany, Stadtwerke Kiel and Braunschweiger Versorgungs AG.

=== Deregulation ===
In 1996, TXU merged with the parent company of Lone Star Gas, allowing TXU to become the largest provider of electricity and natural gas in the state of Texas, a maneuver which set the stage for deregulation. In 2002, the state of Texas deregulated the Texas electric market, and TXU lost its monopoly on retail electric sales in northern Texas.

TXU continued to own transmission and distribution facilities, but was required to open retail sales to competition. Competitors during this time period included Champion Energy, Dynowatt, Texas Power, Entrust Energy, Reliant Energy, Bounce Energy, Direct Energy, Stream Energy, Gexa Energy, Green Mountain Energy, Cirro Energy, and Commerce Energy. Surprisingly, many utility customers opted to remain with TXU despite active retail competition. [See "Power to Choose: An Analysis of Consumer Behavior in the Texas Retail Electricity Market" with Ali Hortacsu and Seyed Ali Madanizadeh]

=== 2002–2004 divestitures ===
TXU divested itself of its European holdings in late 2002 mainly due to the collapse of its UK holdings and then of its Australian holdings in 2004. The UK operations had been purchased following a bidding war with PacifiCorp which pushed up the price paid substantially from opening offers but most of the cost thereof was indebted back onto the UK businesses themselves. Falling UK energy prices (which later rose substantially) and outstanding purchase debt eventually crippled the European business. TXU considered investing £250 million from its US business to bolster the equity base, but following Rating Agency pressure this was shelved in order to protect the credit ratings of the US parent. As a consequence the directors of the UK businesses appointed Administrators in September 2002. The UK retail business and several of its gas fields were purchased by Eon (owners of Powergen), who closed its commercial operations in Rayleigh, Essex and relocated them to Powergen offices in Nottingham & Coventry. TXU's incomplete new UK headquarters were not part of the deal and are now used by Suffolk County Council.

Also, in October 2004, TXU sold its natural gas properties to Atmos Energy. TXU sold its Australian assets to Singapore Power, which retained the distribution businesses (electricity and natural gas distribution networks) in the state of Victoria, and onsold the electricity retail and generation businesses to Hong-Kong-based CLP Group, trading as TRUenergy.

On May 18, 2004 TXU and Capgemini entered a limited partnership to form Capgemini Energy Limited Partnership, a new company that will initially provide business process services and information technology solutions to TXU.

=== 2007 buyout and 2014 bankruptcy ===
Private equity firms KKR, TPG, and Goldman Sachs Alternatives purchased TXU in 2007; the sale became final on October 10, 2007. As part of the buyout, the electric distribution part of the company became Oncor Electric Delivery and the electric generation business became Luminant, leaving TXU Energy as solely a retail provider of electricity, without any electrical distribution or production assets. Luminant owns and operates the Comanche Peak Nuclear Power Plant. The buyout, which left Dallas-based Energy Future with a debt of more than $40 billion, was a gamble that natural gas prices would rise and give its coal-fired plants a competitive advantage. Instead, natural gas prices fell sharply. Consequently, Energy Future Holdings was mired in financial problems, leading to the April 29, 2014 filing for Chapter 11 bankruptcy protection.

== Subsidiaries ==
In 2012, financial ties among subsidiaries were substantially severed, securing their financial independence.

- Oncor Electric Delivery, an independent, regulated subsidiary which is the company's electricity delivery unit, focusing on power transmission and distribution.
- Texas Competitive Electric Holdings, an independent unregulated subsidiary when engages in competitive selling in the Texas electricity market.
- Luminant

== Financial problems ==
The upcoming maturity of a significant amount of debt, coupled with sizable financial losses, had many observers predicting that EFH will ultimately file for bankruptcy, which it did on April 29, 2014. The prominent credit-rating firm Moody's had called EFH "a financially distressed company with an untenable capital structure."

The pending bankruptcy represents the biggest bankruptcy of a private equity-backed company since the failure of Chrysler Group in 2009.

== Environmental impacts ==
Energy Future Holdings owns, and has closed the mines for, four of the nation's highest emitting coal-fired power plants, which together account for approximately one quarter of all industrial/utility air pollution reported to Texas regulators. Its Big Brown (closed), Martin Lake (mines closed), Monticello (closed), and Sandow (closed) plants have been the subject of scrutiny by environmental groups for pollutants such as nitrogen oxides, mercury, and sulfur dioxides.

The Martin Lake, Big Brown, and Monticello plants ranked first, third, and fourth, respectively, in airborne mercury pollution in the United States according to company reports submitted to the EPA. Such high levels of mercury pollution have drawn criticism for their harmful effects on child development.

NOx emissions from EFH's coal plants help contribute to harmful levels of ozone in the air in Dallas and other parts of east Texas, and ozone pollution can trigger asthma attacks and respiratory problems.

=== "Beyond TXU" campaign ===
The Sierra Club and allies launched their "Beyond TXU" campaign to encourage retail electricity customers to switch from EFH's TXU Energy to other retail electric providers without a connection to the EFH coal fleet. Through a variety of advertisements in the DFW area, coupled with a social media campaign, these groups have encouraged customers to visit www.powertochoose.org, a website administered by the Public Utility Commission of Texas, that provides information on retail electric providers.

=== Environmental litigation ===
EFH and its Luminant subsidiary are the subject of litigation by the Sierra Club for alleged violations of the Clean Air Act at the Big Brown Plant, and in 2013 a federal district court judge ruled in favor of Sierra Club on a motion by EFH to stop or slow the case from coming to trial. Similarly, Sierra Club has filed a Clean Air enforcement case against the Martin Lake Plant, and a magistrate judge in that case made a recommendation in 2013 in favor of Sierra Club on an EFH request to stop or slow the case. On July 13, 2012, the U.S. Environmental Protection Agency sent EFH's Luminant subsidiary an enforcement notice under the Clean Air Act about alleged violations of the "New Source Review" provisions of the act, for actions taken by Luminant at the Big Brown and Martin Lake plants.

== Property tax litigation ==
Luminant, a subsidiary of Energy Future Holdings, sued Milam, Freestone, Rusk, and Titus counties in 2011 to challenge the taxable values that the counties had set for Luminant coal plants in each county. As a result of the lawsuits, Luminant reduced its tax liabilities by several hundred million dollars. As significant taxpayers in each county, the decisions have reduced funding to local school districts. Some have suggested that Luminant only sued over property appraisals for coal plant sites that will require pollution upgrades or changes in the near future.

== See also ==
- Deregulation of the Texas electricity market
- Electric Reliability Council of Texas (ERCOT)
- List of power stations in Texas
