= Startex =

Startex may refer to:

- Startex, South Carolina
- StarTex Power, Texas electricity retailer

== See also ==
- StarText
