= TXU =

TXU or txu may refer to:

- TXU Corporation (formerly "Texas Utilities") a USA group companies
  - TXU Energy, energy generation subsidiary of TXU Corp.
  - TXU Energi, subsidiary of TXU Europe, formerly "The Energy Company"
- txu, ISO:639 code for the Kayapo language
- TXU Energie Braunschweig, German basketball team
