= Lauren Engineers & Constructors =

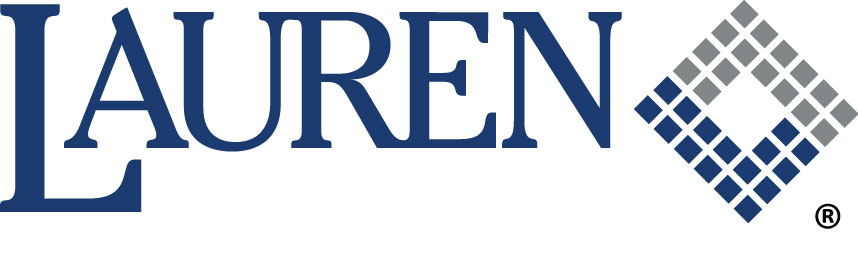
- Company type: Private
- Industry: EPC Construction, Heavy Construction in Power, Chemicals, Polymers, and Refining
- Founded: Atlanta, Georgia (1984)
- Headquarters: Abilene, Texas
- Key people: C. Cleve Whitener III, President and CEO
- Products: EPC contracting
- Services: Feasibility studies, project planning & scheduling, Front End Engineering & Design, Full scope discipline engineering and design, construction, construction management, modular design, fabrication, and erection.
- Number of employees: 1,500
- Website: www.laurenec.com

Lauren Engineers & Constructors is a North American Engineering, Procurement, and Construction (EPC) contractor based in Abilene, Texas. The company specializes in industrial and heavy construction projects in the power, polymers, chemicals, refining, and specialty metals markets in the U.S. and Canada. Lauren also has a strong focus and expertise in the renewable green energy industry and was the EPC contractor for both Nevada Solar One and Florida Power & Light’s 75 MW Martin Next Generation Solar Energy Center. The company is an Engineering News-Record Top 100 Design-Build Firm in the U.S. and a Top 400 Contractor.

The company has regional offices in Irving, Texas; Houston, Texas; Atlanta, Georgia; Knoxville, Tennessee; and Canadian subsidiary offices in Calgary, Vancouver, and Montreal. Fabrication operations are located in Abilene, Texas and Tulsa, Oklahoma. Lauren is licensed as a contractor in 39 states. The corporate motto is “Designing & Building Success.”

== History ==
Founded in Atlanta, Georgia in 1984, Lauren Engineers & Constructors started as a small specialty non-union contractor and subsidiary of Comstock Mechanical. In the 25-years since its founding, the company has become independent and privately owned while growing into a fully integrated provider of professional engineering and construction services. The company’s development has occurred through both internal growth and corporate acquisitions, including companies such as Brock and Blevins (Chattanooga, TN), Commercial Welding Company (South Portland, ME), PCI Engineering (Houston, TX), Kamtech and Kamtech Services, and Tippett & Gee (Abilene, TX).

In 1994, Lauren relocated its headquarters from Atlanta, Georgia to Abilene, Texas, taking up residence in the historic Park Office Building built in 1922. Three years later, the company’s fabrication shop was started in Abilene. The company utilizes the fabrication shop to support Lauren’s EPC projects as well as performing third party work. In 2007, Lauren doubled the size of the company’s headquarters by adding on to the existing building, matching the vintage exterior Neoclassical brick décor.

== Alternative Energy ==
Lauren was the EPC contractor on the 64 MW Nevada Solar One parabolic trough project near Las Vegas, Nevada which was completed in 2007 after just 16 months of construction. This was the first utility scale CSP project to be completed in the U.S. in 16 years. Lauren was the EPC contractor on the 75 MW Martin Next Generation Solar Energy Center for Florida Power & Light. This project is also using parabolic trough technology and became operational at the end of 2010.
