= Sugar Land Space Cowboys =

- Founded in 2012; Sugar Land, Texas
Team logo
Cap insignia

Minor league affiliations
- Class: Triple-A (2021–present)
- Previous classes: Independent (2012–2020)
- League: Pacific Coast League (2021–present)
- Division: East Division
- Previous leagues: Constellation Energy League (2020); Atlantic League (2012–2019)

Major league affiliations
- Team: Houston Astros (2021–present)
- Previous teams: Independent (2012–2020)

Minor league titles
- Class titles (1): 2024
- League titles (4): 2016; 2018; 2020; 2024
- Division titles (4): 2016; 2018; 2019; 2021
- First-half titles (5): 2013; 2014; 2018; 2019; 2024
- Second-half titles (3): 2013; 2016; 2018

Team data
- Name: Sugar Land Space Cowboys (2022–present)
- Previous names: Sugar Land Skeeters (2012–2021)
- Colors: Navy blue, light blue, orange, black, gray, white
- Mascot: Orion
- Ballpark: Constellation Field (2012–present)
- Owner/ Operator: Diamond Baseball Holdings
- General manager: Tyler Stamm
- Manager: Mickey Storey
- Website: milb.com/sugar-land

The Sugar Land Space Cowboys are a Minor League Baseball team of the Pacific Coast League (PCL) and the Triple-A affiliate of the Houston Astros Major League Baseball club. They are located in Sugar Land, Texas, part of the Greater Houston metropolitan area, and play their home games at Constellation Field.

The team began play as the Sugar Land Skeeters in 2012 as an expansion team of the Atlantic League of Professional Baseball (ALPB), an independent baseball league. Their name was a Southern slang word for mosquitos, which are common on summer nights in Southeast Texas. Over eight seasons, they won two league championships (2016 and 2018). In 2020, the Skeeters competed in the Constellation Energy League, a makeshift league they hosted in light of the Atlantic League's cancelled season due to the COVID-19 pandemic. In conjunction with Major League Baseball's reorganization of the minors after the 2020 season, the Houston Astros purchased an ownership stake in the team and made them their Triple-A affiliate in the Triple-A West, which was renamed the PCL in 2022. Also for 2022, the team rebranded as the Space Cowboys. They have since won one PCL championship (2024) and one Triple-A championship (2024).

== History ==
=== Atlantic League of Professional Baseball (2012–2019) ===
In 2008, Sugar Land, Texas, residents voted for the allocation of civic revenues toward the construction of a new baseball park. Initially, the Omaha Royals were interested in moving to the city, but eventually declined because of the construction of Werner Park in suburban Omaha, Nebraska. City of Sugar Land officials contracted Opening Day Partners to build the ballpark to bring professional baseball to the region. The city knew that the Houston Astros of Major League Baseball (MLB) would not approve of an affiliated team in the Greater Houston area, so Sugar Land chose the independent circuit. The American Association and United Baseball League were considered since both organizations had teams located in Texas. The city decided on the Atlantic League of Professional Baseball mainly because Opening Day Partners' other teams were already members of that league. Sugar Land's entry was officially announced on May 18, 2010.

In 2012, the Sugar Land Skeeters signed former MLB pitcher Roger Clemens. The Skeeters sold out tickets on August 25, the night of Clemens' start, where he pitched 3 1/3 innings in a 1–0 win.

The Sugar Land City Council approved an ownership change on October 28, 2014. The council's action cleared the way for Houston-area residents Bob and Marcie Zlotnik, who had been one-third minority partners since the 2012 season, to assume full ownership of SL Baseball, LLC.

Also in the 2014 season, the Atlantic League of Professional Baseball All-Star Game was held at Constellation Field, home of the Skeeters. Usually, in each annual All-Star Game, the best players from the Freedom Division battle it out with the best players from the Liberty Division. However, in the 2014 event, the best players from all around the league faced the Skeeters. Sugar Land won on their home field by a score of 5–3. Nick Stavinoha was recognized as the game's Most Valuable Player. The game attendance was 7,555, which was the fourth highest All-Star Game attendance at the time. The Skeeters reached the Atlantic League championship finals that season but were swept by the Lancaster Barnstormers in the best-of-five-game series, 3–0.

On September 17, 2015, the Skeeters announced the signing of former MLB All-Star Rafael Palmeiro, who had been in retirement for ten years. His son, Patrick Palmeiro, was also a member of the team that year. Shortly after signing with the Skeeters, the elder Palmeiro said, "We discussed me playing earlier this year and it's something I've looked forward to since then. The chance to play with my son is an opportunity the Skeeters have offered me and I'm very excited to make it happen this weekend." On September 18, Rafael Palmeiro debuted for the Skeeters batting third, which was the spot right after his son. The father-son duo combined for five RBIs to lead Sugar Land to a 10–4 victory over the Camden Riversharks.

They returned to the Atlantic League championships in 2016, where they won the ALPB title against the Long Island Ducks, 3–0. Shortly after the conclusion of the 2017 season, Skeeters manager Gary Gaetti stepped down from his position with the expiration of his contract. Gaetti had been the club's inaugural skipper in 2012 and managed the club for their first six seasons (2012–2017).

The Skeeters reached the championship series in 2018 against Long Island, winning three games to two, to win their second championship overall and second in three years. They returned to the championship series again the following year, but lost to the Ducks, 3–2.

=== Constellation Energy League (2020) ===
In 2020, as a result of the COVID-19 pandemic, the Skeeters organization launched their own four-team independent league, the Constellation Energy League, thereby going on hiatus for the 2020 ALPB season. All games were played at Constellation Field, with limited attendance and other COVID-related restrictions. Pete Incaviglia managed the Skeeters, who finished with the best record in the four-team league.

=== Triple-A West / Pacific Coast League (2021–present) ===
In November 2020, the Sugar Land Skeeters reached an agreement with the Houston Astros to be their Triple-A affiliate beginning in the 2021 season. This move was part of a broader Major League Baseball realignment and direct management plan over all minor league player development. The deal also involved the Astros purchasing a majority ownership share of the Skeeters. Sugar Land was organized into the ten-team Triple-A West. The Skeeters began competition as an Astros affiliate in the new league on May 6, 2021, with a 9–4 victory over the Albuquerque Isotopes at Isotopes Park in Albuquerque, New Mexico. Sugar Land won the Eastern Division title by ending the season in first place with a 71–49 record. No playoffs were held to determine a league champion; instead, the team with the best regular-season record was declared the winner. However, 10 games that had been postponed from the start of the season were reinserted into the schedule as a postseason tournament called the Triple-A Final Stretch in which all 30 Triple-A clubs competed for the highest winning percentage. Sugar Land finished the tournament tied for 20th place with a 4–6 record.

After the 2021 season, the team rebranded as the Sugar Land Space Cowboys. The new identity incorporates the team's affiliation with the Astros, Sugar Land's proximity to NASA's Johnson Space Center, and cowboy imagery. In 2022, the Triple-A West became known as the Pacific Coast League, the name historically used by the regional circuit prior to the 2021 reorganization. The Space Cowboys won the first-half of the 2024 season, clinching a spot in the playoffs. They defeated the Reno Aces, winners of the second-half, 2–0 in a best-of-three series, to win their first Pacific Coast League championship. They then won the Triple-A championship against the Omaha Storm Chasers, champions of the International League, 13–6. Manager Mickey Storey led Sugar Land to a league-best 93–56 record, and he was recognized with the PCL Manager of the Year Award.

In December 2025, it was announced that the Houston Astros were selling the team to Diamond Baseball Holdings

== Season-by-season records ==
Key
| League | The team's final position in the league standings |
| Division | The team's final position in the divisional standings |
| GB | Games behind the team that finished in first place in the division that season |
| ‡ | Class champions (2021–present) |
| † | League champions (2012–present) |
| * | Division champions (2012–2022) |
| ^ | Postseason berth (2012–present) |

Season-by-season records
| Season | League | Regular-season | | | | | Postseason | | | MLB affiliate | Ref. |
| Season | League | Record | Win % | League | Division | GB | Record | Win % | Result | MLB affiliate | Ref. |
|---|---|---|---|---|---|---|---|---|---|---|---|
| 2012 | ALPB | 64–76 | .457 | 7th | 4th | 24 | — | — | Result | — | Independent |
| 2013^ | ALPB | 95–45 | .679 | 1st | 1st | — | 0–3 | .000 | Won First and Second-Half Freedom Division titles Lost Freedom Division title vs. Somerset Patriots, 3–0 | Independent | |
| 2014^ | ALPB | 80–60 | .571 | 3rd | 2nd | 1 | 3–5 | .375 | Won First-Half Freedom Division title Won semifinals vs. York Revolution, 3–2; Lost AL championship vs. Lancaster Barnstormers, 3–0 | Independent | |
| 2015 | ALPB | 68–71 | .489 | 5th | 3rd | 6 1/2 | — | — | — | Independent | |
| 2016^ * † | ALPB | 74–66 | .529 | 3rd | 2nd | 2 | 6–0 | 1.000 | Won Second-Half Freedom Division title Won Freedom Division title vs. York Revolution, 3–0; Won AL championship vs. Long Island Ducks, 3–0 | Independent | |
| 2017 | ALPB | 67–73 | .479 | 6th (tie) | 3rd (tie) | 9 | — | — | — | Independent | |
| 2018^ * † | ALPB | 81–45 | .643 | 1st | 1st | — | 6–4 | .600 | Won First and Second Half Freedom Division titles Won Freedom Division title vs. Lancaster Barnstormers, 3–2; Won AL championship vs. Long Island Ducks, 3–2 | Independent | |
| 2019^ * † | ALPB | 72–66 | .522 | 4th | 2nd | 2 | 5–4 | .556 | Won First-Half Freedom Division title Won Freedom Division title vs. Lancaster Barnstormers, 3–1; Lost AL championship vs. Long Island Ducks, 3–2 | Independent | |
| 2020 † | CEL | 17–11 | .607 | 1st | — | — | — | — | Won CEL championship | Independent | |
| 2021 * | AAAW | 75–55 (Note: In 2021, the team with the best record at the end of the regular-season was declared the Triple-A West champion. Sugar Land had a 71–49 (.592) record, 2 games behind first place, which put them 2nd in the league and 1st in their division. The regular-season was followed by the Triple-A Final Stretch, a 10-game postseason tournament in which all 30 Triple-A clubs competed for the highest winning percentage. Sugar Land finished the tournament tied for 20th place with a 4–6 (.400) record.) | .577 | 2nd | 1st | — | — | — | Won Eastern Division title | Houston Astros | |
| 2022 | PCL | 73–75 | .493 | 5th | 4th | 11 | — | — | — | Houston Astros | |
| 2023 | PCL | 61–89 | .407 | 10th | 5th | 30 | — | — | — | Houston Astros | |
| 2024^ † ‡ | PCL | 93–56 | .624 | 1st | 1st | — | 3–0 | 1.000 | Won first-half title Won PCL championship vs. Reno Aces, 2–0; Won Triple-A championship vs. Omaha Storm Chasers, 1–0 | Houston Astros | |
| 2025 | PCL | 73–76 | .490 | 7th | 4th | 10 1/2 | — | — | — | Houston Astros | |
| 2026 | PCL | 74–75 | .497 | 4th | 2nd | 15 | — | — | — | Houston Astros | |
| Totals | — | 1,067–939 | .532 | — | — | — | 23–16 | .590 | — | — | — |

== Ballpark ==
In December 2010, StarTex Power bought the rights to name the future ballpark of the Skeeters. The initial name of the field was StarTex Power Field. A year later, StarTex merged with Constellation Energy and the name Constellation Field was born in December 2011. Constellation Field opened on April 26, 2012, when the Sugar Land Skeeters hosted the York Revolution. The ballpark cost US$37 million to build and is owned by the City of Sugar Land.

== Logos and uniforms ==
Before rebranding on January 31, 2022, The official colors of the Sugar Land Skeeters were imperial blue, nighttime black, rawhide yellow, white, and refinery red. Aside from nighttime black, each color is a regional allusion: "imperial blue" for the Sugar Land–based Imperial Sugar company, "rawhide yellow" for the cattle industry, and "refinery red" for the area's oil refineries. The team's primary logo consists of a mosquito flying over a Texas contour with its proboscis marking Fort Bend County which is located in the Southeast Texas area. The "Skeeters" wordmark centered below is made up of sugarcane-inspired lettering – a reference to the industry's importance to the region. Centered to the right above the contour is "Sugar Land" in black letters with a "lone star." After rebranding the team to the Sugar Land Space Cowboys, the colors became "light blue, navy, orange, gray and black notes".

== Television and radio ==
On April 24, 2014, the Sugar Land Skeeters announced a deal with ESPN that allowed for all home games at Constellation Field to be exclusively broadcast on the Internet channel ESPN3 for the 2014 season, an agreement that was renewed for both the 2015 and 2016 seasons. Away games are heard on radio station KBRZ.

For the 2017 season, the Skeeters dropped their deals with both KBRZ and ESPN. Telecasts moved to the Skeeters' YouTube channel, while radio broadcasts moved to SB Nation Radio flagship station KGOW.

== Mascots ==
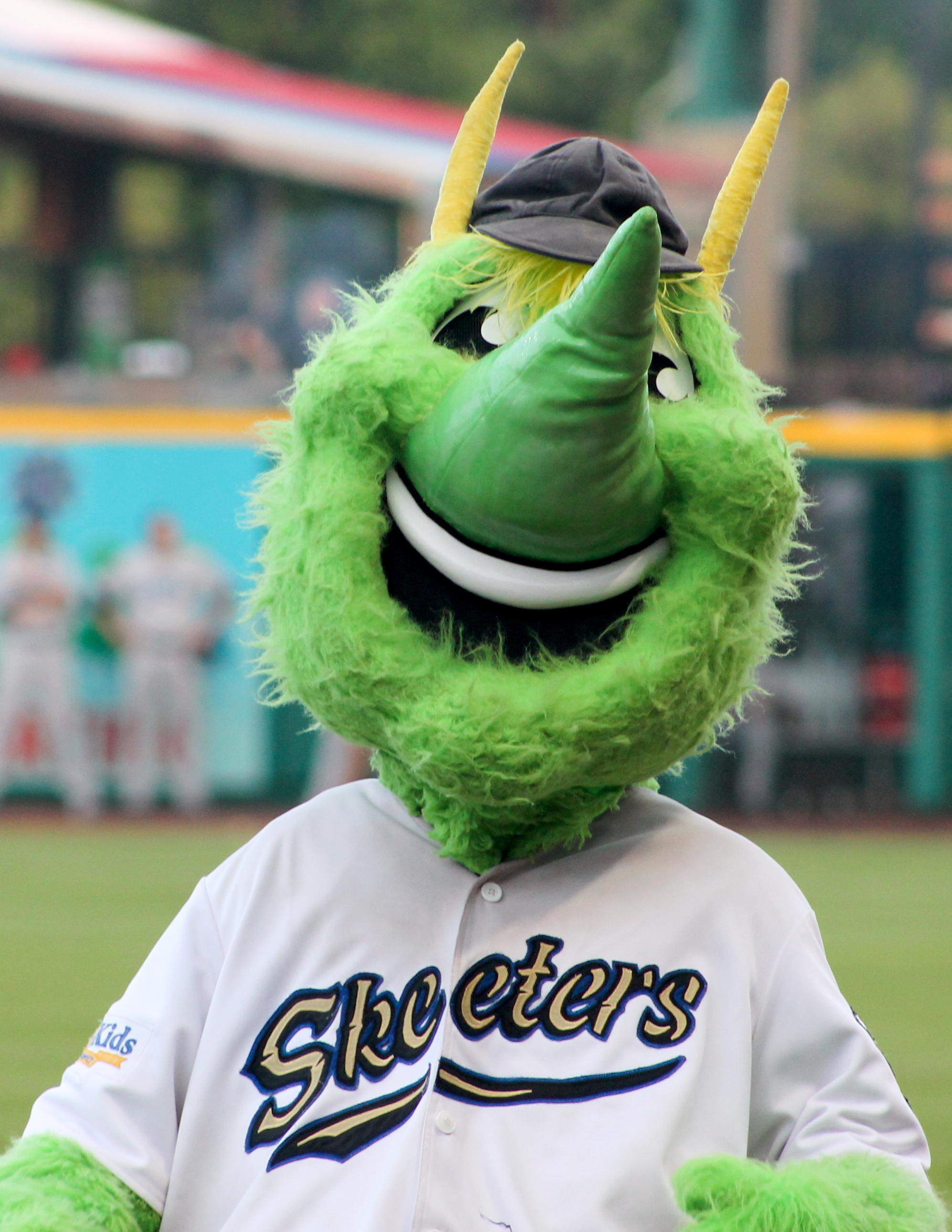
Swatson, one of the Skeeters' mascots, during a July 2014 game

Before January 31, 2022, The Sugar Land Skeeters utilized two mascots. Their primary mascot was Swatson: a large, green mosquito who performed stunts, engaged in fan activities, and was often found throughout the stadium during games. There was also a secondary mascot, the Rally Sloth, who was used in the middle of the ninth inning whenever the Skeeters are trailing. The Rally Sloth was first used in 2019 and was the main mascot of the Sugar Land Lightning Sloths of the 2020 Constellation Energy League. As of January 31, 2022, The Team was rebranded as the Sugar Land Space Cowboys and changed their Mascot to Orion. "Of the species “Canis Cosmicus,” Orion is a cosmic space dog that has become the trusty sidekick of the Sugar Land Space Cowboy."

== Roster ==
Sugar Land Space Cowboys roster
| Players | Coaches/Other |
|---|---|
| Pitchers: 48 Jason Alexander; 15 Brandon Bielak; 67 Cody Bolton; 54 Michael Knorr; 26 Joey Mancini; 39 Bryce Mayer; 27 Trey McLoughlin; 37 Brandon McPherson; 46 Roddery Muñoz; 35 Jackson Nezuh; 40 Christian Roa; 50 Julio Rodriguez; 11 Alex Santos II; 21 Nic Swanson; 51 Ryan Weiss; Catchers: 18 César Salazar; 24 Jason Schiavone; Infielders: 22 CJ Alexander; 4 Trevor Austin; 14 Cavan Biggio; 3 Pascanel Ferreras; 12 Garret Guillemette; 15 Braden Shewmake; Outfielders: 5 Trenton Brooks | Manager: 17 Mickey Storey; Coaches: 28 Sean Buchanan (pitching); 19 Drew Saylor (hitting); 1 Wladimir Sutil (development); 7-day injured list; * On Houston Astros 40-man roster; ~ Development list; # Rehab assignment; ∞ Reserve list; ‡ Restricted list; § Suspended list; † Temporarily inactive list; Roster updated September 27, 2026; Transactions; → More rosters: MiLB • Pacific Coast League; → Houston Astros minor league players |

== Notable alumni ==
- Roger Clemens – former MLB player who signed with the team in 2012
- Tracy McGrady – former NBA player who became a professional pitcher for the Skeeters in 2014
- Scott Kazmir – MLB pitcher before and after his 2012 stint with the Skeeters
- Delwyn Young – former MLB player who signed with the team in 2014
- Jason Lane – former MLB outfielder who pitched for the Skeeters in 2012–2013 and returned to MLB as a pitcher
- Ryan Langerhans - former MLB outfielder who played for the Skeeters in 2013
- Scott Elarton - former MLB pitcher who played with the team in 2013 and retired after the season
- Rafael Palmeiro – former MLB player who signed with the team in 2015
- Daryle Ward - former MLB player who signed with the team in 2015
- Derek Norris - former MLB catcher who played for the team in 2018
- James Loney - former MLB player who played for 11 games for the club in 2019 before retiring
- Hector Olivera - former MLB infielder who played for the team in 2017
- Fernando Perez
- Willy Taveras - former MLB outfielder who played for the club in the 2015 and 2019 seasons
- Brett Eibner - former MLB outfielder who pitched for the Skeeters in 2019
- Chris Colabello - former MLB player who played for the Skeeters in 2019
- Mark Lowe - former MLB pitcher who played for the team in 2019
- Garrett Stubbs - MLB catcher who played for the team in 2021

== Achievements ==
=== Records ===
Atlantic League Team Records
| Category | Statistic | Year |
|---|---|---|
| Most wins in a single season | 95 wins | 2013 |
| Highest winning percentage in a single season | .679 winning percentage | 2013 |
| Highest attendance total in a single season | 456,511 people | 2012 |
| Highest attendance average per game | 6,650 people | 2012 |
| Highest attendance in a single game | 8,606 people | July 4, 2016 |

=== Awards ===
Atlantic League Awards
| Award | Recipient | Year |
|---|---|---|
| Atlantic League First Team (Outfield) | Adam Godwin | 2013 |
| Atlantic League First Team (First Base) | Aaron Bates | 2013 |
| Atlantic League First Team (Catcher) | Travis Scott | 2013 |
| Atlantic League Second Team (Catcher) | Koby Clemens | 2013 |
| Atlantic League Second Team (Closer) | Gary Majewski | 2013 |
| Atlantic League Manager of the Year | Gary Gaetti | 2013 |
| All-Star Game MVP | Nick Stavinoha | 2014 |
| All-Star Game MVP | Travis Scott | 2015 |
| End-of-Season All-Star Team (Catcher) | Chris Wallace | 2015 |
| End-of-Season All-Star Team (Second Base) | Delwyn Young | 2015 |
| Red, White, and Blue All-Defensive Team (Third Base) | Patrick Palmeiro | 2015 |
| Red, White, and Blue All-Defensive Team (Pitcher) | Roy Merritt | 2015 |
| Atlantic League Player of the Year | Jeremy Barfield | 2016 |
| End-of-Season All-Star Team (Outfield) | Jeremy Barfield | 2016 |
| End-of-Season All-Star Team (Relief Pitcher) | Andrew Johnston | 2016 |
| Atlantic League Championship Series MVP | Juan Martinez | 2016 |
| End-of-Season All-Star Team (Second Base) | Josh Prince | 2017 |
| Red, White, and Blue All-Defensive Team (Third Base) | Bryan Pounds | 2017 |
| Red, White, and Blue All-Defensive Team (Pitcher) | Jake Hale | 2017 |
| Atlantic League Championship Series MVP | James Russell | 2018 |
| Red, White, and Blue All-Defensive Team (Outfield) | Anthony Giansanti | 2018 |
| Red, White, and Blue All-Defensive Team (First Base) | Matt Chavez | 2018 |
| Red, White, and Blue All-Defensive Team (Catcher) | Derek Norris | 2018 |
| End-of-Season All-Star Team (Outfield) | Anthony Giansanti | 2018 |
| End-of-Season All-Star Team (First Base) | Matt Chavez | 2018 |
| End-of-Season All-Star Team (Relief Pitcher) | Felipe Paulino | 2018 |
| Atlantic League Manager of the Year | Pete Incaviglia | 2018 |

Pacific Coast League Awards
| Award | Recipient | Year | Ref(s). |
|---|---|---|---|
| Pitcher of the Year | Hunter Brown | 2022 | |
| Manager of the Year | Mickey Storey | 2024 | |
