= Deregulation of the Texas electricity market =

The Texas electricity market is deregulated, meaning that there is competition in the generation and distribution of electricity. Power generators in the Texas Interconnection, managed by the Electric Reliability Council of Texas, participate in an energy-only electricity market and are compensated only for the electricity they produce. The wholesale generation market was deregulated in 1995 and the distribution market in 1999, with Texas Senate Bill 7. This replaced the prior system in which power was generated and consumed locally by the same utility with one in which retail providers contracted with generators across the state.

As a result, 85% of Texas power consumers (those served by a company not owned by a municipality or a utility cooperative) could choose their electricity service from a variety of retail electric providers (REPs), including the incumbent utility. The incumbent utility in the area still owns and maintains the local power lines (and is the company to call in the event of a power outage) and was not subject to deregulation. Customers served by cooperatives or municipal utilities could choose an alternate REP only if the utility has opted in to deregulation; only the Nueces Electric Cooperative has chosen to opt in.

Following the introduction of retail electricity competition in Texas in 2002, commercial and industrial customers increasingly exercised their ability to choose an electricity provider. According to the Public Utility Commission of Texas, by September 2006, approximately 61% of large commercial and industrial customers and 39.4% of smaller commercial and industrial customers were receiving electricity from a provider other than their original affiliated retail electric provider. As of 2008, approximately 40% of residential consumers in deregulated areas switched from the former incumbent provider to a competitive REP. REPs providing service in the state include AmeriPower, TriEagle Energy, Acacia Energy, Ambit Energy, Breeze Energy, Bulb Energy, BKV Energy, Clearview Energy, Green Mountain Energy, Conservice Energy, Iluminar Energy, Now Power, Snap Energy, Entrust Energy, Bounce Energy, Champion Energy, Shnye Energy, Cirro Energy, Direct Energy, Dynowatt, First Texas Energy Corporation, Frontier Utilities, Gexa Energy, Glacial Energy, Just Energy, Kinetic Energy, Mega Energy, APG&E, Adjacent Energy, Spark Energy, StarTex Power, Stream Energy, Tech Electricity, Texas Power, TXU Energy, XOOM Energy and 4Change Energy.

According to a 2014 report by the Texas Coalition for Affordable Power (TCAP), "deregulation cost Texans about $22 billion from 2002 to 2012. And residents in the deregulated market pay prices that are considerably higher than those who live in parts of the state that are still regulated. For example, TCAP found that the average consumer living in one of the areas that opted out of deregulation, such as Austin and San Antonio, paid $288 less in 2012 than consumers in the deregulated areas." However, the report concluded that re-regulating the market would not solve the issue. TCAP instead offered a series of reforms designed to increase market efficiency.

== Background ==
Texas has electricity consumption of $24 billion a year, the highest among the U.S. states. Its annual consumption is comparable to that of Great Britain and Spain. Texas’s electricity market is deregulated, with more than 100 retail electricity providers (REPs) competing for business and offering consumers a wide range of plans. Texas produces the most wind electricity in the U.S., but also has the highest carbon dioxide emissions of any state. As of 2021, Texas residential electricity rates ranked 21st in the United States and average monthly residential electric bills in Texas were the 5th highest in the nation.

== System ==
The law designated the Electric Reliability Council of Texas (ERCOT) to be the authority to oversee grid reliability and operations so as to ensure no particular buyer or seller would gain an unfair advantage in the market.

=== The "price to beat" ===
Included within SB7 was the notion of the "price to beat" or PTB, an idea of a regulated rate governing the pricing behavior of the former utilities.

According to a typical economic theory, prices are optimally determined in a fair and transparent market, and not by a political or academic body. In deregulation of electricity markets, one immediate concern with pricing is that incumbent electricity providers would undercut the prices of new entrants, deterring competition with extensive barriers to entry. This would perpetuate the existing natural monopoly of providers. Thus, the SB7 bill introduced a phase-in period during which a price floor would be established (for incumbent electricity companies) to prevent this predatory practice, allowing new market entrants to become established. New market entrants could charge a price below the price to beat, but incumbents could not. This period was to last from 2002 to January 1, 2007. As of 2007 Texas investor owned utility affiliates no longer have price-to-beat tariffs.

In order to prompt entry into the market, the price to beat would have to be high enough to allow for a modest profit by new entrants. Thus, it had to be above the cost of inputs such as natural gas and coal. For example, a price to beat fixed at the actual wholesale procurement price of electricity does not give potential entrants a margin to compete against incumbent utilities. Second, the price to beat would have to be reasonably low, to enable as many customers as possible to continue to consume electricity during the transition period.

== Results ==
=== Electricity prices ===
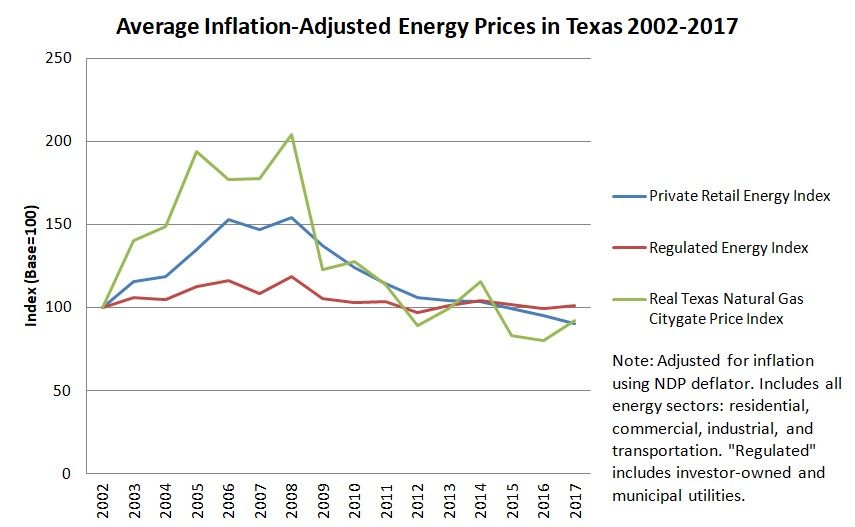
Texas real electricity prices and natural gas prices 2002-2018

Although a desired effect of competition is to lower electricity rates, the residential rate for electricity increased seven times in the four years after deregulation. Nationwide data from the U.S. Energy Information Administration shows that Texas's electric prices did rise above the national average immediately after deregulation from 2003 to 2009, but from 2010 to 2015, prices dropped significantly below the national average price, with a total cost of $0.0863 per kWh in Texas in 2015 vs. $0.1042 nationally, or 17 percent lower in Texas. Between 2002 and 2014 the total cost to Texas consumers is estimated to be $24 billion, an average of $5,100 per household more than comparable markets under state regulation.

During the February 13–17, 2021 North American winter storm, due to the deregulated electricity market and the spike in demand, wholesale electricity prices shot up in some places by 10,000 percent. As a result, Texans who pay wholesale prices such as with retailer Griddy received exceptionally expensive electric bills as high as $450 for one day of use.

=== New competition ===
The price to beat seemed to accomplish its goal of attracting competitors to the market during the period through January 1, 2007. It allowed competitors to enter the market without allowing the incumbents to undercut them in price. It has also given energy consumers the ability to compare energy rates offered by different providers. The less-regulated providers undercut the price to beat by only a small margin given that they must balance lower prices (to attract customers and build market share) with higher prices (needed to reinvest in new power plants). Due to the small difference in competing prices and slow (yearly or so) "buying" process, price decrease due to competition was very slow, and it took a few years to offset the original increase by "traditional" electric providers and move to lower rates.

One of the benchmarks of a successful free market is the range of choice provided to customers. Choice can be viewed both in terms of the number of firms active in the market as well as the variety of products those firms offer to consumers. In the first decade of retail electric deregulation in Texas, the market experienced dramatic changes in both metrics. In 2002, residential customers in the Dallas-Fort Worth area could choose between 10 retail electric providers offering 11 price plans. By the end of 2012, there were 45 retail electric providers offering 258 price plans to residential customers in that market. Similar increases in the number of retail electric providers and available plans have been realized in other deregulated electricity market areas with the state.

=== Environmental impact ===
In environmental impact, results are mixed. With the ability to invest profits to satisfy further energy demand, producers like TXU proposed eleven new coal-fired power plants in 2006. Coal power plants were cheaper than natural gas-fired powerplants, but produce more pollution. When the private equity firms Kohlberg Kravis Roberts and the Texas Pacific Group announced the take-over of TXU, the company, which was known for charging the highest rates in the state and was losing customers, called off plans for eight of the coal plants. TXU had invested more heavily in the other three plants. A few weeks later the buyers announced plans for two cleaner IGCC coal plants.

There are positive environmental impacts from retail price deregulation as well. The profitable and growing Texas electricity market has drawn considerable investment by wind power companies. In July 2006, Texas surpassed California in wind energy production.

Higher electricity prices encourage resident to reduce their electrical usage by using more moderate thermostat settings, installing insulation, installing solar screens, and other such activities. Texas utilities (such as Austin Energy) are also installing advanced electricity meters that may one day enable variable pricing based on the time of day. This would permit energy customers to save money by further tailoring their consumption based on whether it occurred during the peak demand period (high cost/high pollution) or the off-peak (night time).

In 2018, Texas had the 12th highest per capita energy-related carbon dioxide emissions by state in the United States.

== Effect on renewable energy ==
Due to the increased usage of natural gas immediately after deregulation, new-era energy tools such as wind power and smart-grid technology were greatly aided. Texas was to becomes the USA's leading state for solar and wind capacity. Texas's first renewable portfolio standard — or requirement that the state's utilities get a certain amount of their power from renewable energy like wind — was signed into law in 1999, as part of the same legislation that deregulated the electric market.

In 2025, concerns over the free market causing too much energy to be created by Renewables saw bills SB 819 & SB 388 pass the Texas Senate, which if also passed by the State's House, would introduce regulation to require 50% of Texas's energy to be generated by dispatchable sources.

== See also ==
- California electricity crisis
- Electricity provider switching
- Law of Texas
- Oncor Electric Delivery
- Federal Energy Regulatory Commission (FERC)
