= The Briar Club =

Country club in Houston, Texas

Coordinates: 29.7413°N 95.4364°W

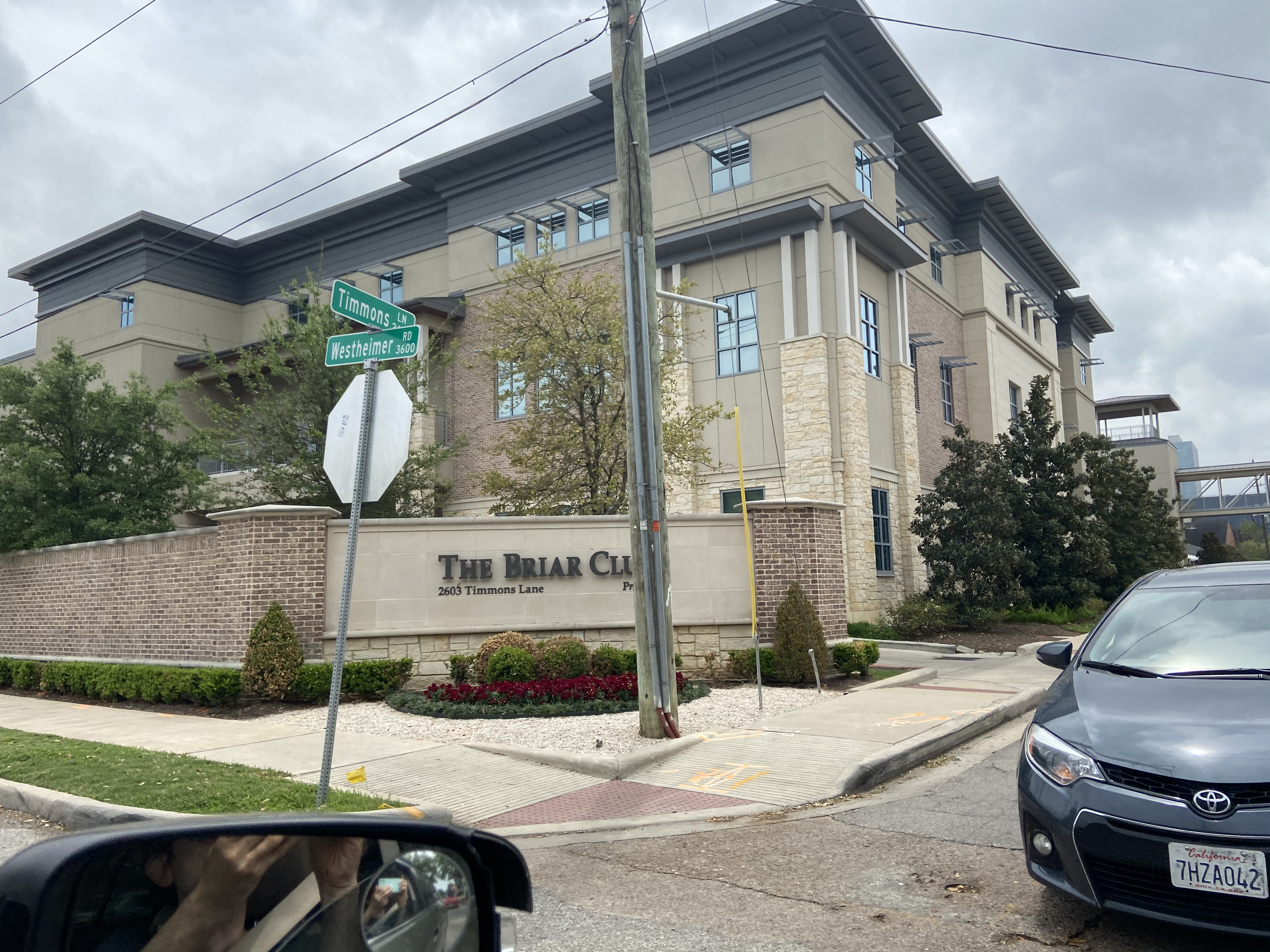
The Briar Club

The Briar Club is a country club in Houston, Texas. It is located in the River Oaks area, at the corner of Westheimer Road and Timmons Lane. The club was founded in 1949 and is member owned. It is between The Galleria and Downtown Houston. As of 2004 it has 1,100 members. As of 2023 the club has 1300 equity members and is now on a waitlist.

As of 2004 the club annually hosts 20 to 25 weddings. Richard Lareau, the club's chief operating officer and general manager, said that he hoped to have the club perform three times that number.

In 1997 Skip Hollandsworth of the Texas Monthly wrote that Briar Club "had become a haven for many River Oaks residents".

It operates under laws for 501(c)(7) Social and Recreation Clubs; in 2024 it claimed $18,833,074 in total revenue and $42,934,395 in total assets.

== History ==
The nearby Westheimer Animal Clinic had been established in 1946. Dr. E.P. Stallings had purchased a city block and started a horse practice on the property. Stallings sold land to what would become The Briar Club for $10,000. The club started in 1949. In 2001 the Briar Club acquired ownership of the Westheimer Animal Clinic building.

In 2004 it was engaging in an expansion that had a cost of millions of dollars over multiple phases. The club anticipated that its master plan would take ten to fifteen years to complete. Phase one, with a scheduled completion date in late December 2004, had a price tag of $4.8 million. The expansion included a sports pavilion, a parking lot for 80 cars, and a new spa and fitness center. Due to the club needing space for its expansion, the Westheimer Animal Clinic was scheduled to move from an adjacent lot of Westheimer Road to a new location in the City of Bellaire in 2004. The club planned to move its catering and laundry operations into the former veterinarian building. The Briar Club would be able to reconfigure its kitchen so it could host larger banquets and weddings. In January 2004 the club demolished two buildings at Westheimer Road at Saint Street so a covered athletic court and a parking lot could be built. As of July 2004 the annex building had been demolished so a fitness center could be built in its place. As of 2004 the fitness center had 4,500 square feet (420 m^{2}) of space. The club planned to expand it to 17,000 square feet (1,600 m^{2}) of space. The club intended to install wooden lockers, massage facilities, a steam room, and a whirlpool.

The next phases were scheduled to include a clubhouse, a parking garage, an expansion of a swimming pool, and the facility's eighth tennis court. The club planned for phase two to begin around 2009. The parking garage, a part of phase two, would be built on the site of a 198-space surface parking lot. Phase three includes the demolition of the current club house and replacing it with a new one. Phase four includes the installation of a tennis court and the expansion of a pool.

In 2010 Champion Energy received a two-year contract to supply electricity service to the club.

== Property ==
The club is situated on a 5.5-acre (2.2 ha) plot of land. It is bounded by Westheimer Road, Timmons Street, Saint Street, and a multifamily housing development. As of 2004 The Briar Club is using 1.25 acres (0.51 ha) of the land. The property features four pools, one large resort style pool with high and low diving boards and enclosed water slide, and two 25 meter lap pools where the Briar Club's youth swim team practices. The Barracudas have dominated the Houston Country Club for decades. The gym, located beyond the lap pool, includes men and women's locker rooms equipped with personalized lockers, cool towelettes, showers, a steam room and a whirl pool. The club has several dining areas, one for casual pool-side dining, another for slightly more up-scale dining, and a bar area, reserved for finer dining. The club provides tennis courts available for rent or tennis lessons, and a covered, outdoor basketball court located just beyond the kids club and playground.

== See also ==
- List of traditional gentlemen's clubs in the United States
