= Florida Power & Light =

Electric utility company in Florida, U.S.

Florida Power & Light Company
- Type: Subsidiary
- Industry: Electric power
- Founded: December 28, 1925; 100 years ago
- Headquarters: 700 Universe Boulevard, Juno Beach, Florida, U.S.
- Number of locations: 98 (2022)
- Area served: Florida
- Key people: Armando Pimentel Jr. (president, CEO)
- Services: Electricity generation; electric power transmission; electric power distribution
- Revenue: ▲$18.37 billion (2023)
- Operating income: ▲$6.59 billion (2023)
- Net income: ▲$4.55 billion (2023)
- Total assets: ▼$4.99 billion (2023)
- Total equity: ▼$38.84 billion (2023)
- Number of employees: 9,500 (2023)
- Parent: NextEra Energy
- Website: fpl.com

Florida Power & Light Company (FPL) is an investor-owned electric utility in Florida. Based in Juno Beach, the company operates power generation, transmission, and distribution throughout its service area. The company serves approximately 5.6 million customers in Northwest Florida, Southwest Florida, and the state's Atlantic coast, making it the largest electric utility in the state. It is the principal subsidiary of NextEra Energy, one of the largest energy companies in the world.

FPL is a regulated monopoly. It is one of Florida's biggest spenders on political campaigns and lobbying. The company has attracted controversy for funding spoiler campaigns against state-level candidates, as well as for lobbying against rooftop solar and industry transparency initiatives.

== History ==
Early power stations in Florida were primarily used to manufacture ice and sell excess power during off-hours from manufacturing. By the 1920s, demand for power had grown sufficiently that the excess power produced by the ice plants no longer met the need. During 1924–1925, American Power & Light (APL) purchased power stations in Florida and connected them to provide more consistent power in the network. In December 1925, APL spun off its Florida properties into a new subsidiary, FPL, to replace the Miami Beach Electric Company. The following year, a hurricane hit Miami, damaging much of the electrical infrastructure. APL paid to repair the damage and build two new power stations. By early 1927, FPL had 115,000 customers.

=== 1950-2009 ===
The company continued to expand its customer base and generating power, and in 1950 became independently listed on the New York Stock Exchange. Throughout the 1960s and 1970s, FPL built new power stations, including Florida's first nuclear power plant at Turkey Point, which began operation in October 1972. The company launched the Watt-Wise home energy audit program in 1978, designed to improve energy efficiency and reduce energy demand during peak demand.

FPL Group, Inc. logo

In 1984, FPL created the holding company FPL Group for acquisitions and the creation of companies. FPL became the first non-Japanese company to win the Deming Prize for quality in 1989.

In 1990, FPL Group began expanding its reach beyond Florida, purchasing a majority stake in a Georgia Power generation facility that year. Over the course of the next two decades, FPL expanded into the southern and eastern United States, creating a new holding group in 1998, FPL Energy, to manage the company's efforts in electricity markets outside of FPL's service area. It acquired a controlling stake in New Hampshire's Seabrook Station Nuclear Power Plant in 2002 and acquired Texas-based Gexa Energy in 2005. The company also launched the telecommunications subsidiary FPL FiberNet during this time. FPL's customer base reached 4 million in 2002.

During the early 2000s, FPL began modernizing its power generation infrastructure, resulting in reduced emissions of flue gas, fuel costs, and oil usage; by 2013, the company was using fewer than 1 million barrels of oil annually. In 2007, the company was the largest utility in Florida. That year, the Florida Public Service Commission rejected an FPL proposal to build a coal-fired power station near Moore Haven, Florida.

At the end of the 2000s, FPL Group and FPL Energy rebranded and were renamed NextEra Energy and NextEra Energy Resources, respectively.

=== 2009-present ===
In 2009, the company started installing smart meters, which communicate with FPL via radio transmissions and provide alerts for outages. The same year, environmental activists camped near the Barley Barber Swamp in protest of the closure of the swamp to public access. The activists claimed FPL was draining the area; the company denied the allegations and said it was working with state and local officials to reopen the area to the public. Seventeen protesters were arrested for trespassing and resisting arrest during the demonstration.

In 2011, FPL fazed an old power station in Cape Canaveral, Florida, the outflow from which warmed the surrounding waters. Manatee migration patterns have been disrupted by power station outflows along the Florida coast and they are attracted to these outflow areas, including those from the Cape Canaveral plant. Following the plant's destruction, FPL spent US$5 million to add pumps and heaters to the area to maintain the environment for the manatees while a new plant was built. Similar replacement projects were undertaken at plants in Riviera Beach and Port Everglades. Following completion of the Riviera Beach project, FPL built the Manatee Education Center and observation area near the plant in 2016.

FPL built the first hybrid solar plant in the world in 2011, which combined solar thermal collectors with combined cycle natural gas generation. The plant, located in Martin County, Florida, had a generation capacity of 75 megawatts. It was decommissioned in 2023. By 2013, FPL owned $34.8 billion in assets and operated 23 plants that generated 24,000 megawatts of electricity. As of 2014, the company had installed 4.9 million smart meters.

In March 2015, FPL launched a Power Delivery Diagnostic Center which uses smart grid technology to manage the electric system in order to maintain reliable service.

In 2016, the company had about 74,000 miles (119,000 km) of power lines in Florida.

In January 2021, Gulf Power Company, which had been acquired by FPL parent NextEra in 2019, was merged into FPL, extending FPL's service territory into Northwest Florida. Gulf Power continued to operate as a separate division within FPL until rate consolidation was approved by the Florida Public Service Commission. As part of the consolidation, FPL assumed Gulf Power's shares in the Scherer Power Plant and Daniel Generating Plant, which Gulf Power co-owned with former sister companies Georgia Power and Mississippi Power, respectively.

In July 2022, FPL started charging ratepayers a $25 minimum bill. Under a minimum bill, customers are required to pay a certain amount to their utility provider each month, even if they do not use any electricity.

FPL agreed to sell Florida City Gas for $923 million to Chesapeake Utilities in September 2023.

In 2026, FPL donated $500,000 to Byron Donalds, a Trump-endorsed candidate in the Florida gubernatorial election. Florida governors appoint the state utility regulators who decide whether to hike rates or not.

== Company overview ==
Fuel source generation by type as of July 5, 2021.
1. Natural gas (75.0%)
2. Nuclear (12.0%)
3. Solar (8.00%)
4. Purchased Power (3.00%)
5. Coal (2.00%)

FPL is the largest power utility in the United States. In 2023, it provided electrical power to approximately 5.9 million accounts, totaling approximately 12 million people. FPL employs approximately 9,500 people. It had operating revenues of $18.37 billion in 2023. The company is headquartered in Juno Beach, Florida; Armando Pimentel Jr. is the president and chief executive officer.

The company has $2 million, 13,000 square foot offices in downtown Tallahassee, the state capital of Florida. One the third floor of the building, the company operates an exclusive, invite-only lounge where the company's lobbyists interact with invited Florida lawmakers.

=== Power generation ===
FPL operated 114 generation units as of 2023, with power transmitted along 90,000 miles of power lines. It has a net generating capacity of approximately 33,276 megawatts; of its net capacity, 73 percent is produced by natural gas or dual-fuel plants, 14 percent comes from solar power, and 11 percent comes from nuclear power.

==== Fossil fuel ====
FPL owns and operates 44 natural gas generating units and has joint ownership of three coal-fired power stations in Mississippi and Georgia. Its natural gas facilities have a generating capacity of approximately 24,254 megawatts. It operates facilities throughout southern and northwestern Florida, including plants in Cape Canaveral, Port Everglades, Riviera Beach, and Palm Beach County. Each of these plants were commissioned in the 2010s and replaced less-efficient oil burning plants.

During construction, the West County Energy Center power station in Palm Beach County was the subject of protests by environmental activists who claimed the plant would damage the Everglades and contribute to climate change. The plant began operations in 2009, and a further expansion started in 2010.

==== Nuclear power ====
FPL owns and operates four nuclear power generators at two sites: Turkey Point, which opened in 1972, and St. Lucie, which opened in 1976.

The company's Turkey Point nuclear facility received criticism in 2015 from some South Florida mayors over concerns about high water usage, insufficient evacuation zones, and increased risks from rising sea levels. FPL responded that they were working to find a solution. In 2018, the company received licenses to expand the facility from the Nuclear Regulatory Commission.

==== Solar power ====
As of February 2024, FPL owned and operated 66 solar power generation facilities with a generating capacity of approximately 4,803 megawatts. It is the most extensive collection of solar facilities in the United States. Among these plants is the DeSoto Next Generation Solar Energy Center. Comprising more than 90,000 photovoltaic panels, it was the largest power station of its kind in the United States when it was completed. President Barack Obama attended its opening. FPL opened a 74.5 MW solar plant at the Kennedy Space Center in 2021.

In addition to large-scale plants, FPL has built smaller-scale solar generation facilities, including solar trees and canopies, through its SolarNow program, as well as 469 megawatts of battery storage.

== Environmental impact ==
=== Wildlife ===
Surrounding the FPL operated Turkey Point Nuclear Power Plant is 168 miles of cooling water canals that attract American crocodiles, which nest in the canals. These canals are home to endangered loggerhead sea turtles, manatees, and crocodiles that are tracked by the plants monitoring program. The sea turtle protection program has tagged over 12,000 sea turtles in 25 years. This program is one of the largest databases of wild captured sea turtles in the world. The College of Turtle Knowledge teaches the public about the study of turtles and how they are being protected.

The cooling outflow of the Riviera Beach Clean Energy Center attracts manatees which seek warm waters. In February 2015, construction began on the Florida Power and Light Manatee Education Center. It will include exhibits and meeting space, a boardwalk, and a manatee web cam.

=== Solar energy ===
FPL began its program Solar for Schools in 2013 and has installed solar arrays at more than 100 schools and non-profit educational centers across Florida. FPL started the SolarNow program, which installs community solar panels throughout Florida, in 2015. FPL customers can voluntarily contribute to the program.

FPL has pushed against net metering and sought to impose minimum monthly payments, facility charges, and grid access fees for rooftop solar energy users. FPL argued that the net metering policy in its present form unfairly required customers who do not own rooftop solar panels to subsidize the energy usage of those who do own them, whereas FPL's opponents argued that utilities like FPL were simply trying to curtail the expansion of rooftop solar panels to maintain their monopoly on electricity markets.

== Controversy ==
Critics of the company have accused the company of skirting rules, evading regulation by influencing politicians, and hiking rates on customers. Some critics allege that the company's influence operations are illicit. The company has been described as one of Florida's most politically powerful companies.

According to records obtained by the Miami Herald and Floodlight, in 2021 FPL lobbied for a bill against net metering, the policy allowing rooftop solar panel users to offset the cost of solar panels by selling excess power back to utilities like FPL. Internal emails indicated that on October 18 an FPL lobbyist sent the text of the bill to Florida state senator Jennifer Bradley, who on October 20 received a $10,000 donation from FPL's parent company to her political committee, and a month later filed the bill in the senate. Bradley denied that the filing of the bill was due to the donation.

According to the Florida Center for Investigative Reporting, several of the top utility companies in Florida, including FPL, have contributed over $12 million towards the election campaigns of state lawmakers since 2010. FPL contributed $2 million to promote 2016 Florida Amendment 1, which would have preserved the monopoly of utilities on rooftop solar in Florida.

In 2021, records obtained by the Orlando Sentinel tied top FPL executives to the political consultants responsible for the "ghost" candidate scandal, promoting spoiler candidates in key races in order to siphon off votes from Democrats.

Documents reviewed by the Orlando Sentinel and the Miami Herald revealed that FPL executives used consultants and shell companies to funnel money to the local news website The Capitolist in order to get pro-utility articles and negative coverage about their political enemies published. An investigation by National Public Radio and Floodlight News found FPL did so through consulting firm Matrix LLC, which also supported positive coverage for itself and FPL-friendly governor Rick Scott in Florida Politics and the Sunshine State News.

Matrix surveilled a Florida Times-Union columnist at home and on vacation in 2019 and 2020, after he wrote critically of FPL's attempts to influence the Jacksonville City Council to approve its acquisition of a local utility. Through a shell company, FPL offered one Jacksonville City Council member a $250,000 a year job promoting his pet issue of marijuana decriminalization on the condition he resign his council seat.

FPL created a proposal to diversify its fuel sources by building a coal-burning power plant on 5,000 acres (20 km^{2}) in Moore Haven, Florida, near the western edge of Lake Okeechobee. After the National Park Service raised concerns that it would emit toxic mercury into the lake and also harm the Everglades, the state Public Service Commission rejected the plan in 2007.

FPL proposed a severe winter weather plan that critics argued would create unnecessary costs for consumers, considering the unlikelihood of a severe winter freeze in Florida.

== See also ==
- NextEra Energy Resources
- List of power stations in Florida
- The Capitolist
