= Louis J. Wortham =

American newspaperman, author, and politician (1859–1927)

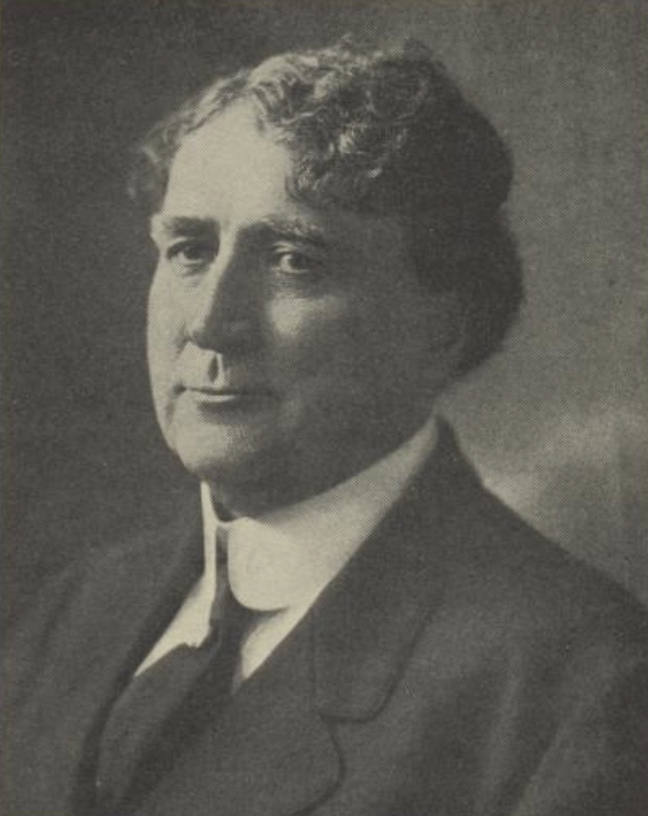
Wortham pictured c. 1914

Louis J. Wortham (March 27, 1859 – September 10, 1927) was a newspaperman, author, and politician in Texas. He was heavily involved in the early years of the Fort Worth Star-Telegram and served four terms in the Texas House of Representatives from 1909 to 1915, representing Tarrant County. His five volume History of Texas from Wilderness to Commonwealth was published in 1924.

== Biography ==
Louis J. Wortham was born in Sulphur Springs, Texas, in 1858 or 1859, (Note: A profile of Wortham in The Star-Telegram gives his birth-year as 1858. While the Texas State Historical Association gives his birth date as November or March 27, 1859, their article on him includes a photograph of his gravestone with a birth year of 1858. The Tarrant County archives say he was born "about 1858.") to William A. Wortham and Elizabeth Ashcroft Wortham. His father was the editor of the Sulphur Springs Gazette, and Louis helped him with activities such as typesetting for the paper as a child.

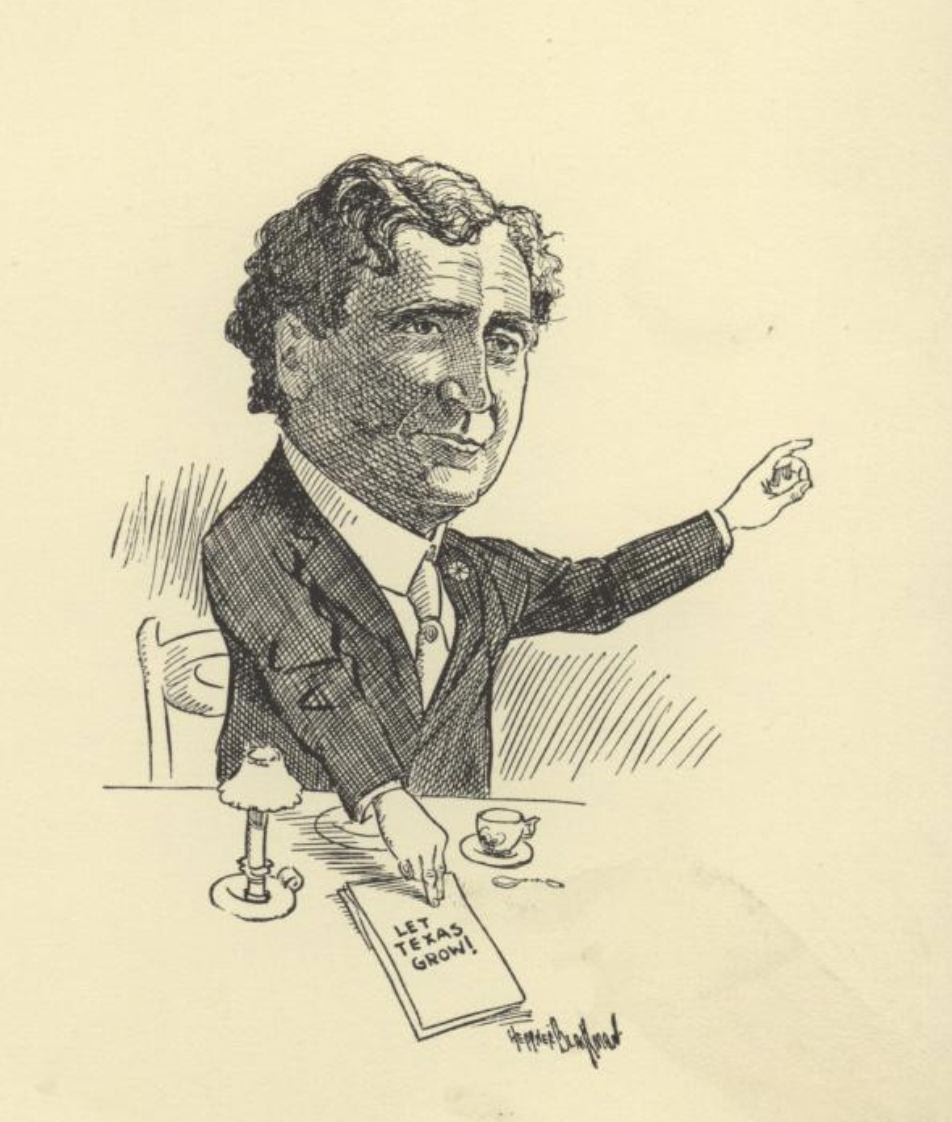
Wortham as depicted in the 1914 Makers of Fort Worth

Wortham spent a portion of the 1880s as a captain or colonel in the River Guards, patrolling the Rio Grande. He later worked as Richard Coke's private secretary while Coke was serving in the United States Senate. While Grover Cleveland was president he was employed as a federal inspector in cities including Mobile, Alabama, Laredo, Texas, and San Antonio. After this, Wortham worked for New York city newspapers, corresponding first from Washington, D.C., and then from Mexico City. By 1900 he was working for the Houston Post as chief editorial writer. He founded, published, and with John Sturgis Bonner wrote for The Current Issue in Austin, Texas. He worked as commissioner of the Texas exhibit for the 1904 Louisiana Purchase Exposition in St. Louis.

In 1906, Wortham was hired by Amon G. Carter, D. C. McCaleb, and A. G. Dawson as the first editor of the Fort Worth Star. (Note: Sources conflict over whether Wortham was involved in the foundation of the paper.) Shortly afterwards he became president of the paper until it purchased the Fort Worth Telegram in 1909, becoming the Fort Worth Star-Telegram. Wortham served as vice-president and editor of the combined paper, reaching the role of president in 1913. Wortham and Carter partnered together to found a new publisher for the paper in 1916, the Wortham-Carter Publishing Company. Wortham remained president until he retired in 1923.

He served four terms in the Texas House of Representatives from 1909 to 1915, representing Tarrant County as a member of the Democratic Party. From January 1919 to June 1923 Wortham was a member of the University of Texas System's Board of Regents.

Wortham, who had long wanted to write a history of Texas, authored the five volume History of Texas from Wilderness to Commonwealth published in 1924.

He supported development of a pilot training facility in Texas.

== Personal life ==
Wortham married Frue Bector in 1880. She died in 1922. He was a member of organizations including the Benevolent and Protective Order of Elks, the Fraternal Order of Eagles, and various local clubs. He died on September 10, 1927.
