= Martin Next Generation Solar Energy Center =

Solar parabolic-trough component

- Country: United States
- Location: Martin County, Florida
- Coordinates: 27.053°N 80.550°W
- Status: Operational
- Construction began: December 2008
- Commission date: December 2010
- Construction cost: $141 million
- Owner: FPL

Solar farm
- Type: CSP
- CSP technology: Parabolic trough
- Collectors: 6,864 (192,192 mirrors)
- Total collector area: 464,908 square metres (5,004,230 sq ft)
- Site area: 500 acres (202 ha)

Power generation
- Nameplate capacity: 75 MW
- Capacity factor: 24%
- Annual net output: 124 GW·h (planned)

External links
- Website: www.fpl.com/environment/solar/martin.shtml

Martin Next Generation Solar Energy Center is the solar parabolic-trough component of an integrated solar combined cycle (ISCC) 1150 MW plant, in western Martin County, Florida, United States, just west of Indiantown. The project was built by Florida Power & Light Company (FPL). Lauren Engineers & Constructors (Abilene, TX) was the EPC contractor for the project. Its construction began in 2008 and was completed by the end of 2010.

The ISCC plant is part of the Martin Plant site which consists of 5 units. Unit 1 & Unit 2 are 800 MW steam electric generating units that use natural gas and low-sulfur residual oil. Unit 3 & Unit 4 are 500 MW natural gas-fired combined cycle units.

Unit 8 is a natural gas fired 4-on-1 combined cycle unit with a nominal capacity of 1150 MW. Light oil is used as backup. Unit 8, placed into commercial operation in 2005, is integrated with the solar plant. Unit 8 features four 170 MW gas turbines, one 470 MW steam turbine, and a single condenser and cooling tower The single solar field circuit heats 4 steam generators, after each gas turbine. The Martin solar thermal facility is designed to provide steam for FPL's existing Martin Unit 8 combined cycle unit, thus reducing FPL's use of natural gas. No additional capacity (MW) will result from the operation of the solar thermal facility.

The Solar Energy Center has an array of approximately 190,000-mirror parabolic troughs on about 500 acres (202 ha) of the Martin County plant. The solar collectors feed heat to the existing steam plant, displacing gas generated electricity at an estimated rate of 155,000 MWh per year. The 2012 solar-derived production was about 89,000 MWh of power, according to records filed with the state’s Public Service Commission, which was 42% less than projected when the plant got approval.

The solar component can generate electrical energy only if the four gas turbines are in operation, otherwise the 470 MW steam turbine will not move. When gas turbines are stopped, the solar heat is used to keep the steam turbine in temperature, in order to facilitate a more rapid start-up.

FPL expects the $476 million solar plant to reduce the combined-cycle power plant's natural gas consumption by 1.3 billion cubic feet (37 million m³) per year. Over the 30-year life of the project, this is expected to save $178 million in fuel cost and reduce carbon emissions by 2.75 million tons.

Excess pressure and a release of operating fluid led to the plant being shut down for four months in 2011 for cleanup and testing.

As of 2026, no additional concentrated solar plants are planned for Florida, although in 2007 FPL had planned on building a 300 MW Fresnel solar thermal plant.

== Production ==
Generation (MW·h) of Martin
| Year | Jan | Feb | Mar | Apr | May | Jun | Jul | Aug | Sep | Oct | Nov | Dec | Total |
|---|---|---|---|---|---|---|---|---|---|---|---|---|---|
| 2011 | 2,868 | 4,641 | 9,249 | 2,891 | 3,357 | 114 | -120 | -120 | 3,640 | -118 | 2,668 | 0 | 29,067 |
| 2012 | 5,017 | 2,921 | 9,915 | 12,018 | 9,555 | 9,100 | 11,001 | 7,541 | 6,169 | 7,146 | 3,956 | 3,999 | 88,338 |
| 2013 | 4,388 | 7,288 | 8,883 | 7,254 | 12,784 | 14,352 | 12,872 | 10,675 | 8,227 | 9,372 | 2,522 | 3,264 | 101,881 |
| 2014 | 4,632 | 8,055 | 10,500 | 11,950 | 13,344 | 9,944 | 11,009 | 12,322 | 11,236 | 16,884 | 5,971 | 8,629 | 124,476 |
| 2015 | 4,730 | 437 | 8,791 | 9,877 | 15,155 | 15,571 | 17,349 | 14,827 | 7,468 | 6,139 | 3,809 | 1,950 | 106,103 |
| 2016 | 2,222 | 5,510 | 5,728 | 11,479 | 13,962 | 9,534 | 5,404 | 6,522 | 5,344 | 2,638 | 4,344 | 6,635 | 79,322 |
| Total | | | | | | | | | | | | | 529,187 |
