= The Capitolist =

Florida-based political news outlet

- Type: News website
- Founder: Brian Burgess
- Founded: 2016
- Website: thecapitolist.com

The Capitolist is a Florida-based news outlet created by Brian Burgess in 2016. It was revealed to be funded by "dark money" beginning in 2018 connected to Florida Power & Light (FPL) in 2022. This allowed FPL to request articles that would promote candidates, discourage deregulation, and attack reporters critical of FPL.

Payments from FPL have funded The Capitolist since at least January 2018, through Matrix LLC, Metis Group LLC, and other consulting companies. Matrix LLC created fake candidates to influence state senate races in Florida in 2020, which led to discovery of their connection to The Capitolist. After "operatives" for Matrix took control of The Capitolist in 2019, email records showed "Matrix operatives and Florida Power and Light executives dictating Capitolist coverage."
