= Fort Worth Star-Telegram =

Daily newspaper published in Fort Worth, Texas, US

- The front page of the Fort Worth Star-Telegram, May 30, 2024
- Type: Daily newspaper
- Format: Broadsheet
- Owner: The McClatchy Company
- Publisher: Steve Coffman
- Editor: Steve Coffman
- Founded: 1906 (as Fort Worth Star)
- Headquarters: Fort Worth, Texas; US
- Circulation: 13,000 Average print circulation 14,000 Digital Subscribers
- ISSN: 0889-0013
- Website: www.star-telegram.com

The Fort Worth Star-Telegram is an American daily newspaper serving Fort Worth and Tarrant County, the western half of the North Texas area known as the Metroplex. It is owned by The McClatchy Company.

== History ==
In May 1905, Amon G. Carter accepted a job as an advertising space salesman for the new newspaper The Fort Worth Star. The Star printed its first edition on February 1, 1906, with Carter as the advertising manager, and Louis J. Wortham as its first editor. The Financier and President of the Fort Worth Star was Colonel Paul Waples, head of the Waples Platter Company and instrumental in nearly all of early Fort Worth institutions. The Star lost money, and was in danger of going bankrupt when Carter, and Wortham went to Waples. He cut a check for the additional funds and purchased his newspaper's main competition, the Fort Worth Telegram. In November 1908, the Star purchased the Telegram for $100,000, and the two newspapers combined on January 1, 1909, into the Fort Worth Star-Telegram.

Paul Waples was the President of the Star Telegram publishing company and Chairman of the Board when he was tragically killed in an Interurban accident at his estate in Arlington Nov 16, 1916. Amon Carter and Louis Wortham were pall bearers for Paul Waples, who left a significant legacy which is notated on a plaque dedicated to his memory at the Star Telegram building in Fort Worth. Carter took the ball and from 1923 until after World War II, the Star-Telegram was distributed over one of the largest circulation areas of any newspaper in the South, serving not just Fort Worth, but also West Texas, New Mexico, and western Oklahoma. The newspaper created WBAP in 1922 and Texas' first television station, WBAP-TV, in 1948.

Capital Cities Communications purchased the newspaper along with WBAP-AM-FM from the Carter family in 1974. Disney, then the owner of Capital Cites, sold the Star-Telegram along with other newspapers to Knight-Ridder in 1997 and McClatchy purchased Knight-Ridder in 2006.

In August 2024, the newspaper announced it would reduce its number of weekly print editions to three a week: Wednesdays, Fridays, and Sundays.

== Market ==
The Star-Telegram's circulation area is the Fort Worth/Arlington metro area (four counties) and 14 surrounding counties. The newspaper's primary market is the four-county Fort Worth/Arlington metro area, as well as the Dallas and Fort Worth suburb of Grand Prairie. The Fort Worth/Arlington metro area is the western part of the fourth-largest U.S. metropolitan area, the Dallas/Fort Worth/Arlington combined statistical area. Fort Worth/Arlington ranks 29th most populous as a metro area.

== Pulitzer prizes ==
- 1981 Pulitzer Prize for Spot News Photography: Larry C. Price for "his photographs from Liberia".
- 1985 Pulitzer Prize for Public Service: Mark Thompson "for reporting which revealed that nearly 250 U.S. servicemen had lost their lives as a result of a design problem in helicopters built by Bell Helicopter—a revelation which ultimately led the Army to ground almost 600 Huey helicopters pending their modification".

== Online presence ==
The Star-Telegram is the nation's oldest continuously operating online newspaper. StarText, an ASCII-based service, was started in 1982 and eventually integrated into the paper's current website, star-telegram.com.

== Awards ==
The newspaper's "Titletown, TX" video series earned three 2017 Lone Star Emmys, the first in Star-Telegram history, and an award for excellence and innovation in visual storytelling from the 2017 Online Journalism Awards.

In 2006, the Star-Telegram won the Missouri Lifestyle Journalism Award for General Excellence, Class IV.

== See also ==
- List of newspapers in Texas
