= StarTex Power =

Electricity Company

- Industry: Energy
- Founded: 2004 in Houston, Texas
- Defunct: June 20, 2018
- Fate: Acquired by Constellation
- Headquarters: Houston, Texas
- Parent: Constellation (An Exelon Company)

StarTex Power was a Texas-based retail electricity provider between 2004 and 2018. The company was headquartered in Houston, Texas.

== History ==
Texas deregulated the electricity market in 2002. StarTex Power was founded in 2004 by Marcie and Bob Zlotnik. Marcie previously served as president and director of Gexa Energy, a retail electricity provider she co-founded in 2001. StartTex was purchased by Constellation Energy in 2011 and the StarTex brand was discontinued on June 20, 2018.

== The Company ==
StarTex Power served roughly 170,000 customers. The company sold its services to commercial and residential customers and collaborated with different companies to provide StarTex Power Green.

In 2009 StarTex Power was ranked #1 by JD Power and Associates for customer satisfaction. In 2010, StarTex Power was a Pinnacle Award recipient by the Better Business Bureau for their customer care and ethical practices. StarTex was also named a Houston Chronicle Top Workplace in 2010 after their launch of an employee stock ownership plan and for their continuing efforts to foster employee growth and encouragement.

On May 27, 2011 Constellation Energy announced its intention to purchase StarTex Power, which was completed on June 1, 2011. After the acquisition, StarTex kept its headquarters in Houston, where its 150 employees reside.

== See also ==
- StarTex Power Field
