= Ambit Energy =

American multi-level marketing company

- Industry: Multi-level marketing, energy
- Genre: Retail electricity and natural gas provider
- Founded: 2006
- Founders: Jere Thompson, Jr., Chris Chambless
- Headquarters: Dallas, Texas, United States
- Area served: TX, IL, IN, OH, MD, PA, NJ, CT, MA, ME, CA, DE, RI, NH, VA, and Washington D.C.
- Key people: Jere Thompson Jr.; (Co-Founder & CEO); Chris Chambless; (Co-Founder & CMO); John Burke; (CIO); Laurie Rodriguez; (CFO)
- Revenue: US$1 billion (2013)
- Number of employees: 625 (2014)
- Parent: Vistra Corp
- Website: ambitenergy.com

Ambit Energy is an international multi-level marketing company that provides electricity and natural gas services in energy markets in the U.S. that have been deregulated. The company's corporate headquarters are located in Irving, Texas. Ambit Energy was founded in 2006 in Addison, Texas by Jere Thompson Jr. and Chris Chambless. Since August 2019, Ambit Energy has operated as a subsidiary of Vistra Corp, which acquired the company in an all-cash transaction valued at $475 million plus net working capital.

== Business model ==
Ambit Energy obtains customers through a network of independent consultants who work directly with the customers. Ambit Energy uses a multilevel marketing model and is a member of the Direct Selling Association of America, a public relations and lobby organization that represents the interests of multilevel marketing companies in the United States.

Ambit typically offers customers one or two-year fixed-rate contracts for utilities. After the contracts expire, services may automatically switch to variable-rate plans unless customers manually renew the fixed-rate plans. In some cases, Ambit's variable-rate plans are substantially more expensive. This has prompted complaints and lawsuits from consumers, and an investigation from the New York Public Service Commission. In December 2015, the Department of Public Service in New York announced that it had settled out of court and secured refunds for 1,566 Ambit customers, totaling nearly one million dollars.

Ambit Energy was named 2010's Fastest Growing Privately Held Company by Inc. Magazine. The company placed 390th in 2011, 1,996th in 2013, and 2,074th in 2014.

== Products and services ==
Ambit Energy offers electric, gas, solar services and Green-e plans, offered with a Renewable Energy Certificate. The products and services are offered through their independent consultants.

=== Solar ===
Solar is offered through Sunrun in several Ambit markets: Illinois, California, Connecticut, Massachusetts, Maryland, New Hampshire, New Jersey, New York, Pennsylvania, Rhode Island and Washington DC. The service is sold through Ambit's independent consultants. Their customers are then matched with a representative from Sunrun who completes the enrollment process.

== Criticism from consumer advocates ==
Ambit Energy has come under scrutiny from regulators and consumer advocates. A 2014 story by ConsumerAffairs documents numerous complaints by customers whose rates doubled or tripled without warning. Complainants also said it was difficult to contact Ambit to discuss rates or switch plans.

In New York, state officials and consumer groups have claimed that sales representatives, who are paid by commission, have misrepresented contracts, exaggerated financial benefits of membership, and been excessively aggressive in recruiting vulnerable groups such as the elderly and non-native English speakers. In 2014, the New York Public Service Commission (NYPSC) received 450 complaints about the company, most of which are for price gouging, or unanticipated rate increases following the expiration of contracts. In May 2015, the NYPSC launched an investigation into the company. The results of the NYPSC investigation were announced in December 2015, with Ambit refunding 1,566 customers for a total of $950,700.

The company has been the defendant in class-action lawsuits in Illinois, New York, New Jersey, and Pennsylvania. The New Jersey lawsuit alleging that Ambit unfairly hiked up its rates was dismissed by the judge, who ruled that Ambit disclosed its rates in its terms of service.

In Texas, Ambit accumulated $57,500 in fines between 2010 and 2012 for violating customer protection rules.

Carol Biedrzycki, of the consumer organization Texas ROSE, has said that representatives for multi-level marketing energy companies are more focused on marketing than on providing continuing service. Biedrzycki has also criticized Ambit and some other Texas energy providers for charging excessive connection and disconnection fees.
