= Constellation Field =

Baseball park in Sugar Land, Texas, US

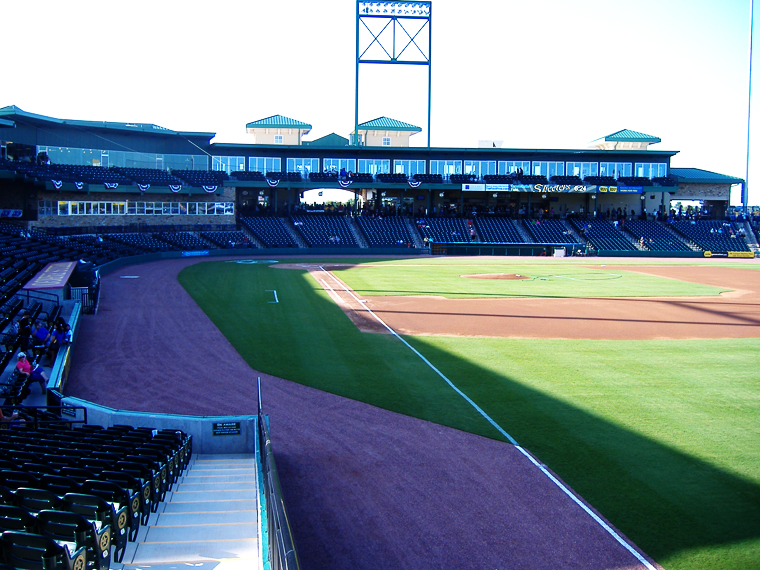

- Location within Texas Location within the United States
- Former names: StarTex Power Field
- Location: 1 Stadium Drive; Sugar Land, Texas; United States
- Coordinates: 29.622751°N 95.647179°W
- Owner: City of Sugar Land
- Operator: SL Baseball Management, LLC
- Capacity: 7,500
- Surface: Bermuda Grass
- Field size: Left field: 325 feet (99 m); Center field: 405 feet (123 m); Right field: 323 feet (98 m)

Construction
- Groundbreaking: April 5, 2011
- Opened: April 26, 2012
- Cost: $37 million
- Architect: Barton Malow
- General contractor: Linbeck

Tenants
- Sugar Land Space Cowboys (ALPB/PCL); 2012–present Houston SaberCats (MLR) 2018–2019

Constellation Field is a baseball park located in Sugar Land, Texas. It is the home of the Sugar Land Space Cowboys of the Pacific Coast League, who began play in 2012 as the Sugar Land Skeeters. The park also has the ability to host rugby union, American football, soccer, lacrosse, and cheerleading competitions, as well as concerts. Constellation Field has a capacity of 7,500 spectators for baseball games, and 9,500 spectators for concerts.

== History ==
In December 2010, StarTex Power—a Houston-based power company—bought the naming rights for the ballpark from the team and the City of Sugar Land. In December 2011, the ballpark's name was changed to Constellation Field after the merger of StarTex Power and Constellation Energy.

Constellation Field opened on April 26, 2012 when the Sugar Land Skeeters hosted the York Revolution.

=== Concerts ===
The ballpark has held various concerts in its history. On October 19, 2012, REO Speedwagon and Night Ranger used Constellation Field as a venue, and the following day ZZ Top and Kenny Wayne Shepherd did the same.

On October 9, 2015, Constellation Field hosted "Country at the Ballpark" with Chris Young, Eli Young Band, and Cassadee Pope.

=== College baseball ===
Constellation Field hosted the Southland Conference baseball tournament in 2013 and annually from 2015-2019.

Constellation Field is also an annual neutral site for a regular season game of the Silver Glove Series between the Houston Cougars and Rice Owls. The Cougars lead the all-time series 3–0 over the Owls at Constellation Field. The Houston Christian Huskies baseball team hosted the Sugar Land Classic, a three-day, three-game round robin, played at Constellation in 2023 and 2024. The St. Thomas Celts baseball team, who does not have a de facto home field, plays select games at Constellation Field.

=== Rugby ===
In 2018, the Houston SaberCats of Major League Rugby utilized the ballpark for exhibition games of the upstart league. They later played their regular season home games at Dyer Stadium. For the 2019 season, the club anticipated having a dedicated rugby stadium for their use, Aveva Stadium, to be completed in time for the first home game. Due to construction delays caused by weather, the SaberCats continued play at Constellation Field for the beginning of their season. As of 2024 they play their home games at SaberCats Stadium.

=== Acquisition by the Houston Astros ===
On April 20, 2021, the Sugar Land City Council approved the acquisition of the Sugar Land Skeeters by the Houston Astros, as well as extended the Skeeters' Constellation Field lease until 2045.

== Features ==
Constellation Field has one of the largest scoreboards in minor league baseball. It is also unique in that its shape resembles Texas' borders. The scoreboard, constructed by TS Sports, rises almost 100 feet above the playing field. Additionally, Constellation Field has a traditional, manually operated scoreboard in the left-field wall.
