= Texas Power =

Texas Power, LP
- Company type: Privately Owned
- Industry: Electric Utilities
- Founded: 2005
- Headquarters: Arlington, TX, United States
- Area served: Texas
- Key people: Bart Simmons, CEO; David Chase, GM; Kevin Hermann, CFO
- Parent: Tristar Producer Services, Inc.

Texas Power is an electricity marketplace serving much of Texas. They are headquartered in Arlington, Texas.

Texas Power services roughly 20,000 residential electricity customers. Texas Power also serves small, medium and large commercial accounts.

== See also ==
- Deregulation of the Texas electricity market
- Electric Reliability Council of Texas (ERCOT)
