= Stream Energy =

American multi-level marketing company

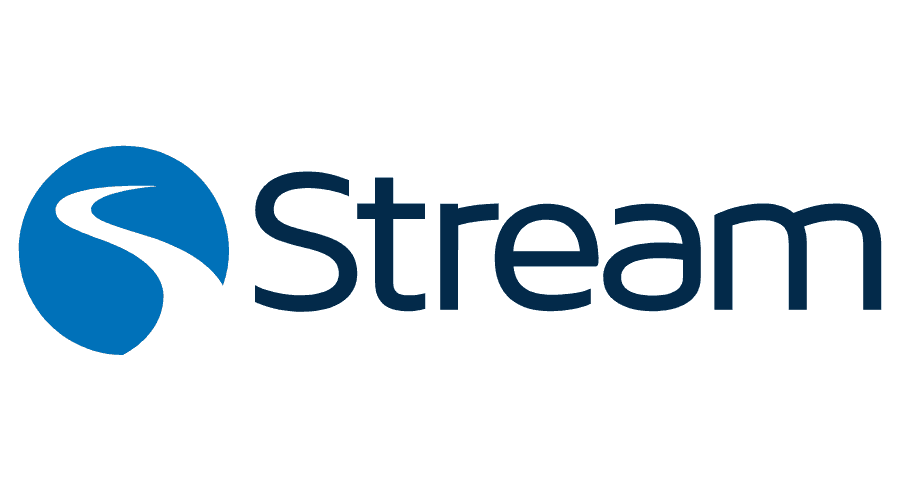
- Company type: Subsidiary
- Industry: Retail electricity provider/multi-level marketing
- Founded: 2005; 21 years ago
- Founders: Rob Snyder; Pierre Koshajki, Chris Domhoff, Alex Rodriguez
- Headquarters: Dallas, Texas, United States
- Number of employees: 245 (August 2017)
- Parent: NRG Energy
- Website: mystream.com

Stream Energy is a subsidiary of NRG Energy and a retail electricity company. It uses multi-level marketing as its primary sales channel. The company sells electric and gas services in seven states and Washington, D.C.

== History ==
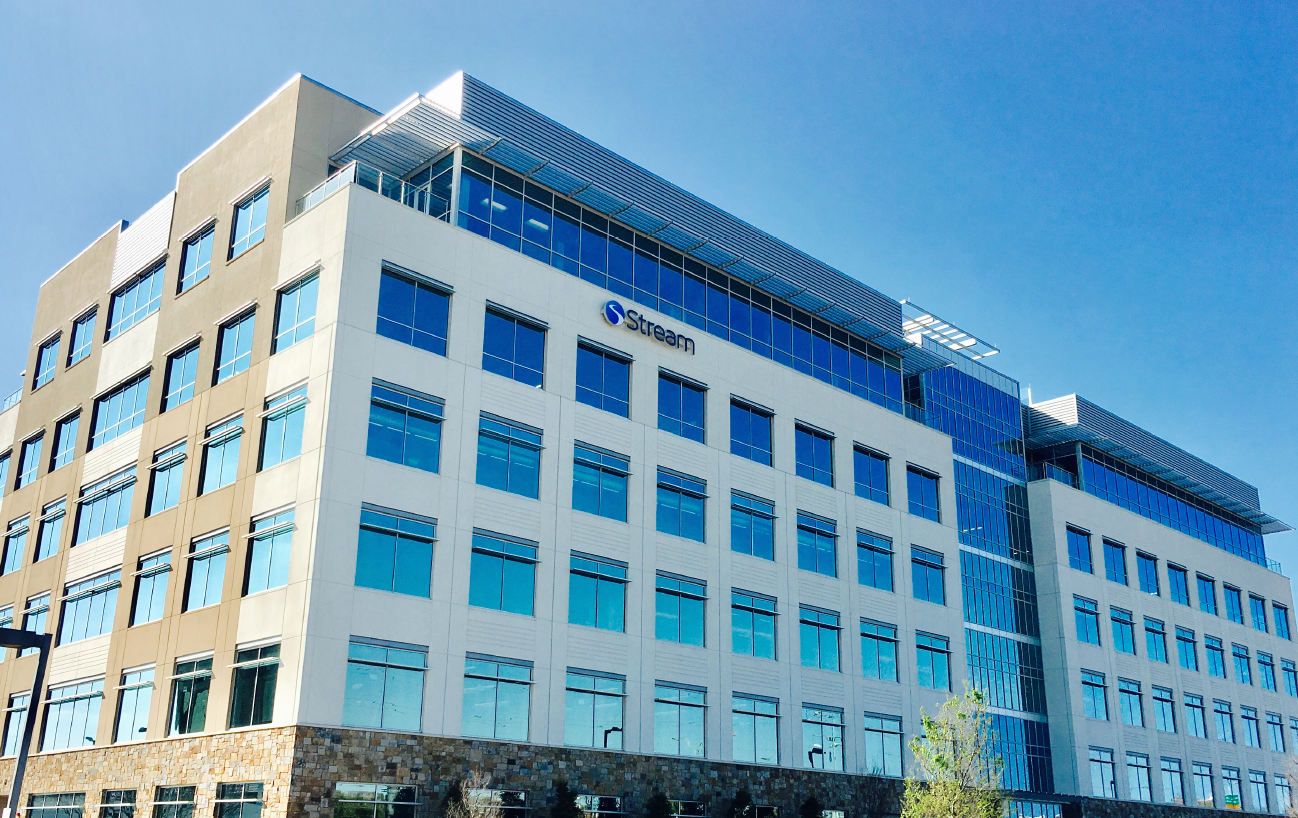
Stream at the Tollway Center building in Dallas, TX

Stream was founded in 2005 by Rob Snyder and Pierre Koshakji. Stream has energy services in seven states, including Texas, Pennsylvania, New York, New Jersey, Georgia, Maryland and Illinois, as well as Washington D.C. The company first offered energy services in Texas following the deregulation of the Texas electricity market. The company expanded to Georgia in 2008, followed by the Northeast in 2010. In 2015, Stream also began offering mobile phone service, Stream Wireless.

Stream moved its headquarters from the Infomart building on Stemmons Freeway to the Tollway Center office building on Dallas Parkway in North Dallas in May 2017.

Despite an influx of independent contractors (termed "directors") signing up with Ignite, the multi-level marketing arm of Stream, the majority of this sales force "lost nearly all their investments."

=== NRG ===
In 2019, Stream was acquired by NRG for $300 million.
