= StarText =

Defunct ASCII-based computer service

StarText logo

StarText was an online ASCII-based computer service run by the Fort Worth Star-Telegram and the Tandy Corporation and marketed in the Dallas-Fort Worth Metroplex newspaper circulation area from May 3, 1982 until March 3, 1997. Its name was derived from Star (representing the newspaper which would provide the content) and Text (representing the computer company which would provide the technology).

StarText was an "information on demand" online computer service created by Joe Donth, offered for the first time in 1982 by the Fort Worth Star-Telegram to subscribers in the Dallas-Fort Worth Metroplex. On May 3, 1982, StarText officially started providing its news and all-text content online, updated from 5am to midnight. There were no graphics, pictures or colors. Subscribers were called StarTexans. The content within StarText was written by subscribers of the service as well as employees of the newspaper.

Initially, the service charged $5.00 a month to subscribers who received updated news each day from 5am until midnight daily. At first subscribers had to call StarText using a 300 baud modem and enter four requests out of a choice of 50. StarText then delivered the information without further interactivity. To receive more information the subscriber had to repeat the same process. The first StarText system was provided by a Tandy Model II.

The subsequent multi-user version of StarText, developed by Serge Stein, was written in DIBOL and ran on Digital Equipment Corporation VAX 11/750s connected to banks of 1200 & 2400 baud modems. This version provided a menu of content including the Star-Telegram's news and classified advertising, and provided messaging between subscribers (early email), Grolier's encyclopedia, American Airlines Sabre flight schedules and home banking to a group of over four thousand dedicated computer users. Users could define their screen size to the system which would then deliver only as much text as would fit on the screen giving the user the opportunity to read the content before 'paging' on to the next screen of text. At one point billing for this service was based on the number of words sent to the user.

In May 1996 an additional Internet service, StarText Net, was introduced, and the earlier service was rebranded as StarText Classic. The original service finally closed down on March 3, 1997, and in June 1998, StarText Net changed into Star-Telegram Online Services, which eventually became a conventional online Internet service of the Knight-Ridder group.

== Subscription history ==
Six months following start-up, the service only had 50 customers because many computers then on the market could not connect to StarText. Some of the early subscribers accessed the service using the Timex Sinclair 1000 with its 16K RAM and 300 baud modem. At its height the service attracted about 2,000 subscribers.

== StarTexans ==
StarText benefitted from a loyal group of columnists who acted as unpaid content producers who were also subscribers. Their columns were in text only and originally without color, but the content of the columns were original, varied and of a sufficiently reasonable standard to maintain their own readership. Because these columns were basically under the control of their creators the originality, scope and depth of the information presented was both unique and extensive.

In the 1990s, these columnists enjoyed meeting with each other at functions arranged by the StarText service of the Fort Worth Star-Telegram.

== StarText Ink ==
The StarText service also produced a printed newsletter, StarText Ink, published for subscribers. This newsletter carried logs of the subscriber columns, and it also featured its own articles.

== StarText Net and GEnie ==
Three years after the start of the original StarText service, General Electric's Information Services division launched its ASCII-based online service, GEnie, in October 1985. The main difference between the original StarText and GEnie was that StarText offered online news from the newspaper that owned the service, plus the electronic magazine whose content was created by the subscriber-writers. GEnie was a collection of RoundTable forums, but it did not offer news or individual features written by subscriber-writers. However, the one advantage that GEnie had was its nationwide scope via its General Electric servers, in contrast to the Dallas-Fort Worth Metroplex coverage offered by the Tandy system.

Ten years after start-up, the nationwide appeal of GEnie became attractive to many StarText subscribers, and a word-of-mouth membership migration began to take place. In response to this competition and in an attempt to retain its own membership base, a decision was made by the owners of StarText to rebrand the original service as StarText Classic and to create the new StarText Net, offering access to the early Internet, including an email address. In late 1995 StarText Net began its beta version. The service was offered to the public in May, 1996.

== Termination of StarText Classic ==
The demise of the original StarText service came with the growth of the Internet. StarText Classic service closed March 3, 1997 at 5:12pm CST with only three users still logged on.

== Star-Telegram Online Services ==
In June 1998 the name StarText Net was changed to Star-Telegram Online Services. Because of competition from other Internet service providers, the original theme of original featured content that once made StarText into a unique home for StarTexans was not promoted. When the newspaper was bought by the Knight-Ridder group, the online service was then transformed to mirror the more conventional services offered by other newspapers over the Internet, and all but a few references to the StarText trademark disappeared.
