= Champion Energy =

American utility company

- Industry: Electric Utilities
- Founded: 2005
- Headquarters: Houston, TX, United States
- Area served: Texas, Pennsylvania, Ohio, Illinois, New Jersey, New York, Delaware, Maryland, Washington, D.C.
- Key people: Michael Sullivan, president and CEO
- Parent: Calpine
- Website: www.championenergyservices.com

Champion Energy is a retail electricity provider (REP) based in Houston, Texas. Champion Energy currently provides electricity services to residential customers in Texas and to commercial and industrial customers in deregulated electric energy markets across the country including Connecticut, Illinois, Maine, Maryland, Massachusetts, New Jersey, New York, Ohio, Pennsylvania, and Texas. The company is a retail subsidiary of Calpine, America's largest generator of electricity from natural gas and geothermal resources.

== History ==
Champion Energy was first licensed by the Public Utility Commission of Texas in 2004.

== Products and services ==
Champion Energy Services offers various retail electricity plans based on market and customer type. All customers can choose fixed-price plans, which lock in electricity rates for the duration of the contract. Commercial customers have access to more complex options, including index-based, hybrid (fixed and index), block and index, and layered purchase plans. These options are tailored to individual customers, involve greater participation, and carry different risk profiles compared to fixed-price plans.

== Recognition ==
The company was ranked “Highest in Residential Customer Satisfaction with Retail Electric Service” by J.D. Power in its Texas Residential Retail Electric Provider Customer Satisfaction Studies from 2010 to 2013 and again from 2015 to 2016. It has also received an A+ rating from the Better Business Bureau, was named “Best Texas Electricity Provider” for three consecutive years by Texas Electricity Ratings, and holds a 5-star rating from the Public Utility Commission of Texas.

== See also ==
- Deregulation of the Texas electricity market
- Electric Reliability Council of Texas (ERCOT)
- Electricity provider switching
