= Oncor Electric Delivery =

Oncor Electric utility equipment company in the United States

Oncor Electric Equipment Delivery Company LLC
- Type: Subsidiary
- Industry: Electric Utility
- Founded: 2002
- Headquarters: 1616 Woodall Rodgers fwy svc rd Dallas Texas 75202
- Key people: Allen Nye (CEO)
- Revenue: ▲US$6.778 billion (2025)
- Net income: ▲US$1.07 billion (2025)
- Number of employees: 5,500
- Parent: Sempra Energy
- Website: www.oncor.com

Oncor Electric Equipment Delivery Company is the largest transmission and distribution electric utility in Texas. Their service territory encompasses east, west, and north-central Texas, including Dallas, Denison, Fort Worth, Killeen, Midland, Odessa, Round Rock, Sherman, Temple, Tyler, Waco, and Wichita Falls. In 2018, Sempra Energy acquired a majority stake in Oncor for US$9.45 billion.

== History ==
The company was formerly known as TXU Electric Delivery and TU Electric. Predecessor companies include Dallas Power & Light (DP&L), which served the city of Dallas; Texas Electric Service Company (TESCO), which served areas surrounding Fort Worth; and Texas Power and Light (TP&L), which served other areas of northwest and east-central Texas. Oncor is TXU electric delivery replacing analog meters in Texas with digital meters throughout its system, although some older analog meters remain.

Oncor was privately held by a limited number of investors, including Energy Future Holdings Corporation (EFH), and separately managed by a majority independent board of directors. While a majority owner, EFH was not involved in the management of Oncor. On March 24, 2016, the Texas Public Utility Commission (PUC) granted the request to convert Oncor into a real estate investment trust (REIT) with the reservation that the PUC would consider the treatment of potential tax savings (estimated at $250 million) from the REIT structure in a separate proceeding to be held at a future date. The subsequent proceeding's focus was to determine how the potential tax savings attributable to the REIT format would be shared with utility ratepayers.

On July 7, 2017, it was announced that Berkshire Hathaway had agreed on a deal to buy the whole of Energy Future Holdings and ultimately Oncor. This bid was ultimately surpassed by Sempra Energy, which bid $9.45 billion in cash and the assumption of debt on August 21, 2017. The acceptance of the Sempra bid effectively terminated the Berkshire bid. The Sempra bid subsequently received court approval on September 6, 2017. On March 8, 2018, regulators in Texas approved Sempra Energy's purchase of a majority stake in Oncor for $9.45 billion.

== Major projects ==
As of 2014, Oncor was working in partnership with Siemens AG Power Technologies to build a smart grid in an exploration of the use of storage batteries and micro-grids. The Competitive Renewable Energy Zone (CREZ) project was intended to improve the transmission of wind power to Oncor's grid.

Oncor works with private and public utilities nationwide through organizations called mutual assistance groups. Oncor is a member of the Texas Mutual Assistance Group, the Midwest Mutual Assistance Group, and the Southeastern Electric Exchange. These mutual partnerships are part of a larger network of utilities that meet throughout the year to share best practices and improve upon safety methods. Members are able to quickly access and deploy resources and personnel across long distances to communities impacted by severe weather. For example, Oncor crews went to Florida and Georgia to assist in the aftermath of Hurricane Matthew in 2016. Oncor crews traveled to California in 2018 to help restore power to areas devastated by wildfires, as well as Florida in 2019 to assist in preparations for Hurricane Dorian.

== Environmental impact ==
Oncor Electric Delivery Company's Take A Load Off Texas provides a variety of energy efficiency programs for residences and businesses in an effort to reduce energy and save people money on their electric bill. Oncor budgeted more than $50 million for its programs in 2019; in the last ten years, Take A Load Off Texas has helped more than 250,000 customers reduce their energy usage.

Oncor assisted with the adoption of larger, commercial electric vehicles in Texas. The company worked with electric vehicle original equipment manufacturers and other utilities to monitor the use of electric vehicles in its service territory to provide power supply to vehicles and homes; it has helped install and plan locations for charging stations.

For nine consecutive years, Oncor has partnered with the Arbor Day Foundation's Energy-Saving Trees Program to give away thousands of free trees to customers. The program is designed to help customers better understand where to plant trees for maximum energy savings and the protection of electrical equipment.

Oncor's transmission system is planned to connect to a $104 million solar farm in Falls County. San Antonio–based OCI Solar Power is planning the project where 800 acres will be leased from private landowners in the reinvestment zone where it plans to build the 100-megawatt farm.

Oncor partnered with IBM Oncor to predict for preventative maintenance where vegetative growth is most likely to interfere with power lines, which can cause blackouts and wildfires.

== Social responsibility ==
In April 2020, Oncor donated $1.7 million to community non-profit organizations across its service territory, that serve those most affected by the COVID-19 pandemic.

In 2021, Oncor announced a donation of 110 acres of land to the City of Dallas to be used as a public park. It will be the largest donation of land to the city since the 1930s.

== See also ==
- List of companies in Dallas
- List of United States electric companies
