= Electricity provider switching =

Ability of power consumers to have an option to change their electricity provider

Electricity provider switching is the ability of power consumers to have an option to choose their electricity provider in a deregulated electricity market as permitted by a state public utilities governing body.

== Australia ==
The Australian market has been somewhat deregulated, but still sees consumers provided with a narrow band of choices.

== Canada ==
Electricity is deregulated in two Canadian provinces: Ontario and Alberta. Both markets showed price spikes in the first year of deregulation, but then settled down into a volatile but reasonably stable environment. Alberta's market is dominated by fossil fuel generation and as such reacts more closely to the price of natural gas. Ontario's generation mix is about 50% nuclear.

=== Ontario ===
The consumer has the choice between buying from their local utility (Local Distribution Company - LDC) or from one of the deregulated suppliers. There is a large range of contract options from a variable price to 1,3 or 5 year fixed prices. Electricity provider switching is difficult once the consumer is in one of these contracts, unless they are close to the end of a fixed price contract. However, as of January 2010 there is a maximum termination penalty allowed.

A very important element in switching electricity providers in Ontario is understanding the Global Adjustment. This is an adjustment for some commitments government agencies have made on your behalf. It is included in the LDC Regulated Price Plan, but is an additional line item if a contract is signed.

=== Alberta ===
The consumer has the choice between buying from their local utility (Local Distribution Company - LDC) or from a deregulated suppliers. There are however many fewer of these in Alberta. Electricity provider switching is difficult once the consumer is in one of these contracts, unless they are close to the end of a fixed price contract.

There is a price comparison service operation in Canada.

== France ==
In France, electricity market is totally deregulated and consumers have the choice between the historical formerly state-owned provider EDF and several new private providers like Direct Énergie.

== United Kingdom ==
Electricity supply has also been deregulated in the United Kingdom.

== United States ==
In deregulated markets such as Texas and Maryland, the state government may require the incumbent utility energy provider to allow for unlimited competition within the marketplace, where the consumer is free to choose any electricity provider. Electricity provider switching allows consumers to compare rates and services of different retail providers, and enroll in different contract types (such as fixed-price contracts, indexed, and hybrid). Switching is only practical if a customer is either buying from a utility, willing to pay an early termination fee, or is at the end of a contract with a provider.

Certain U.S. states allow for consumer choice in electricity providers, with Texas being the most-widely watched deregulatory scheme. Many other states are surveying the Texas deregulatory model in order to use its design as a model for the imposition of free market forces within such other power markets.

As of 2019, 19 U.S. states and the District of Columbia have "either full or partial retail choice." Along with aforementioned Maryland and Texas, electricity deregulation is current in Connecticut, Delaware, Illinois, Maine, Massachusetts, Michigan, Montana, New Hampshire, New Jersey, New York, Ohio, Oregon, Pennsylvania, and Rhode Island. Seven additional U.S. states began the process of electricity deregulation but have suspended efforts: Arizona, Arkansas, California, Nevada, New Mexico, Virginia, and Wyoming.

In 2019, Arizona's regulatory agency (Arizona Corporation Commission) considered implementing retail electricity deregulation. The proposal was opposed by Arizona Public Service Co. (APS), an electric utility that provides electricity to 2.7 million people. APS said it was opposed because the change would "not be in the best interest of customers" because it would create issues surrounding reliability, "conflicts . . . with existing law," and clean energy implementation difficulties.

== See also ==
- Community Choice Aggregation
- Deregulation
- Deregulation of the Texas electricity market
- Electricity market
