= TXU Energy =

American retail electricity provider

- Type: Public company
- Industry: Electricity Retailer
- Founded: 2002, Dallas, Texas
- Headquarters: Irving, Texas
- Area served: Deregulated regions of Texas
- Products: Retail electricity plans and products
- Parent: Vistra Corp.

TXU Energy is an American retail electricity provider headquartered in Irving, Texas, serving residential and business customers in deregulated regions of Texas since the deregulation of the Texas electricity market in 2002. A subsidiary of Vistra Corp, it is one of the largest retail electricity providers in Texas.

== History ==
The first instance of electricity generation in North Texas dates to 1882 when Dallas Electric Lighting Company, an indirect TXU Energy predecessor, began providing electric light service to the city of Dallas. A few years later, in 1885, Fort Worth Electric Light and Power Company, another indirect TXU Energy predecessor, was founded and began servicing areas west of Dallas.

A number of electric companies formed in the years that followed: TXU Energy's direct forerunners, the Texas Power & Light Company (TP&L); Dallas Power & Light (DP&L), to serve the Dallas area; and Texas Electric Service Company (TESCO) to serve Fort Worth and areas west of Abilene.

In 1984, DP&L, TESCO, and TP&L merged as divisions of a new principal subsidiary, Texas Utilities Electric Company.

In 1999, the company was renamed TXU Corp., positioning itself as a multinational energy company, eventually competing in electricity markets on three continents: Australia, Europe and North America. It eventually discontinued all operations outside of North America in 2002.

=== Deregulation ===
On May 21, 1999, the Texas Legislature passed Senate Bill 7 (SB 7), which required the creation of a competitive retail electricity market. TXU Energy was one of the first certified retail electricity providers to begin offering service at market open in 2002. TXU Corporation’s three main entities during the first several years of deregulation were TXU Energy, a retail electricity provider (REP), TXU Electric Delivery, a transmission and distribution utility (TDU) and TXU Power, a wholesale electricity generation provider.

In 2007, through a private-equity acquisition led by KKR, TPG Capital and Goldman Sachs, TXU Corporation was acquired by Energy Future Holdings Corp. (EFH). TXU Energy retained its name, while TXU Power was renamed Luminant, and TXU Electric Delivery was renamed Oncor.

On April 29, 2014, Energy Future Holdings (EFH), TXU Energy’s parent company at the time, entered bankruptcy. In October 2016, certain subsidiaries of EFH, including TXU Energy, Luminant and EFH’s corporate services department, emerged from reorganization in a court-approved spin-off under parent company Texas Competitive Electric Holdings (TCEH), and a new CEO, Curt Morgan, was announced. Later in 2016, TCEH changed its name to Vistra Energy.

TXU Energy's parent company, Vistra Energy, began trading on the New York Stock Exchange on May 10, 2017.

== Community and Conservation Initiatives ==
TXU Energy participates in a variety of community initiatives and environmental conservation efforts in Texas.

=== TXU Energy Aid ===
TXU Energy Aid began in 1983 to help customers who don’t have the means to pay for electricity service. Since its inception, TXU Energy Aid has aided 455,000 customers, totaling more than $84 million in assistance. Funds are raised from employee and customer donations.

=== Committed to Community Growth Program ===
Through its Committed to Community Growth program, TXU Energy partners with the Texas Trees Foundation to plant trees in communities across Texas. Located at Richland College, the TXU Energy Urban Tree Farm and Education Center is the largest nonprofit urban tree farm in the nation. The tree farm produces trees for the community and allows volunteers to log hours by planting, mulching and pruning. Through its partnership with the Texas Trees Foundation, over 240,000 trees have been planted across the state.

=== Houston Zoo ===
TXU Energy in 2014 passed the $1 million mark in donations to the Houston Zoo. The company has been the presenting sponsor of the Houston Zoo's Chill Out program since 2011 and Zoo Lights since its inception. In addition, TXU Energy has sponsored other events such as the zoo's annual Gift of Grub campaign, which matches donations up to $50,000.

== Legal and regulatory proceedings ==
TXU Energy and related TXU entities have been involved in several regulatory and legal matters following the deregulation of the Texas electricity market.

In 2005, the United States Court of Appeals for the Fifth Circuit affirmed the dismissal of a lawsuit brought by Texas Commercial Energy against TXU Energy and other market participants. The plaintiff alleged that TXU and other defendants had manipulated the Texas electricity market, but the court held that the claims were barred by the filed-rate doctrine.

In 2007, TXU Energy reached a settlement with staff of the Public Utility Commission of Texas related to the renewal process for certain small and medium business customers on term service plans. According to a securities filing by Energy Future Holdings, the investigation did not involve residential customers. TXU Energy denied violating rules but agreed to pay a $5 million settlement as a compromise.

TXU Corp., TXU Energy’s then-parent company, also faced public criticism in 2006 and 2007 over plans to build new coal-fired power plants in Texas. Reporting at the time said TXU proposed 11 of 16 planned coal plants in Texas, drawing scrutiny from environmental groups, lawmakers, and industry analysts. After TXU Corp. agreed to a private-equity buyout in 2007, the prospective buyers agreed to cancel eight of the 11 proposed coal plants, although some environmental groups continued to object to the remaining projects.

In 2024, TXU Energy Retail Company LLC agreed to pay $91,500 under a settlement with staff of the Public Utility Commission of Texas. Reporting on the settlement said it resolved alleged violations of Texas customer-protection rules.

== See also ==
- List of Texas companies (T)
