= Gexa Energy =

Retail electricity provider in Texas

Gexa Energy, headquartered in Houston, Texas, is a retail electricity provider which sells electricity service to residential and commercial customers in all deregulated markets in Texas.

The company is a subsidiary of NextEra Energy Resources. Based in Juno Beach, Florida, NextEra Energy Resources is a subsidiary of NextEra Energy, Inc.

== Overview ==
The Public Utility Commission of Texas approved Gexa Energy as a retail electric provider in 2001.

Gexa Energy entered the Texas deregulated electricity market in 2002. The company services residential and commercial customers in Houston, Dallas, Fort Worth, Corpus Christi, Midland, Harlingen, Odessa, Lubbock, Waco and all Texas markets where electricity service has been deregulated. Gexa Energy was acquired by NextEra Energy, Inc. formerly FPL Group, in 2005. Gexa operates as a subsidiary of NextEra Energy Resources. NextEra markets under the NextEra Energy Services brand in Delaware, Maryland, New Hampshire, New Jersey, Pennsylvania, and the District of Columbia.

In August 2019, Gexa Energy announced that all of its residential plans will be powered by 100% renewable energy.

== See also ==
- Deregulation of the Texas electricity market
