= Martin Lake Line =

Texas Utilities Martin Lake Line
Overview
- Parent company: Luminant
- Reporting mark: TUGX
- Locale: Martin Lake Power Plant

Technical
- Track gauge: 4 ft 8 1/2 in (1,435 mm) standard gauge
- Electrification: 25 kV AC, 60 Hz (1976-2011)

The Martin Lake Line is a railroad owned and operated by Texas Utilities and hauled Lignite coal from nearby mines at the Oak Hill Mine and Beckville Mine, until their closures in the later 2010's, to the Martin Lake Power Plant and has a connection with the BNSF Railway's Longview Subdivision near Tatum, TX. Coal from the Powder River Basin in Wyoming is transferred onto the line via the connection with BNSF. The line was constructed as an electrified line, using 25 kV AC, 60 Hz electrification, and operated GE E25Bs and former Ferrocarriles Nacionales de México GE E60s; however, the line was de-electrified in 2011.

== Motive Power ==
Year built	Builder	Model	Numbers	Notes
1976	General Electric Transportation	GE E25B	2300-2306	Displaced by GE E60s in 1999
1982-1983	General Electric Transportation	GE E60C-2	N/A	Former N de M.
1953	ALCo	Alco S4	1537	Former ATSF. Disposition unknown.
N/A	General Electric Transportation	GE U23B	2309-2310, 23013	Used to haul ash trains.
N/A	Electro-Motive Division	EMD SD50	23020-33030, 53002-53003	23020-33030 Are former Conrail units, 33030 served in CSX. 53002-53003 Are former C&NW
2004	Electro-Motive Division	SD70ACE	5308-5309	Former EMD demonstrator units 1205 and 1206.
