= GE E25B =

Locomotive class

Type and origin
- Power type: Electric
- Builder: General Electric
- Build date: 1976–1977
- Total produced: 7
Specifications
- Configuration
  - AAR: B-B
  - UIC: Bo′Bo′
- Gauge: 4 ft 8 1/2 in (1,435 mm) standard gauge
- Length: 64 ft 2 in (19.56 m)
- Height: 16 ft (4.88 m)
- Loco weight: 280,000 lb (130,000 kg)
- Electric system/s: 25 kV 60 Hz AC
- Current pickup(s): Pantograph
- Traction motors: 4 × GE 752V
Performance figures
- Maximum speed: 70 mph (113 km/h)
- Power output: 4,000 hp (3.0 MW)
Career
- Operators: Texas Utilities
- Numbers: 2304-2306, 3301-3304
- First run: October 8, 1976

The GE E25B is a class of four-axle 4,000 hp (3.0 MW) B-B electric locomotives made by General Electric (GE) in 1976–77. Only seven units were built, all for use by Texas Utilities on two short industrial freight lines.

== Design ==
Similar to the more powerful E60, the E25B was designed for use hauling coal between mines and power plants on industrial short lines. It was designed for operation on 25kV AC at 60 Hz at up to 70 miles per hour (110 km/h), though normal use was half that speed. It was lighter and less powerful than the E60: 4,000 hp (3.0 MW) on four axles versus 6,000 hp (4.5 MW) on six, and at 280,000 lb (130,000 kg) around two-thirds its weight.

== Operation ==
The seven E25B locomotives built were all used by Texas Utilities on the Martin Lake Line (serving the Martin Lake Power Plant) and the Monticello Line (serving the Monticello Steam Electric Station). They were numbered 2304-2306 and 3301–3304. Electrification was activated on the Monticello Line on October 7, 1976, with service beginning the next day.

The Martin Lake Line began operation in 1977, with two its locomotives delivered later. The four locomotives at Martin Lake ran in shuttle service between a mine and the power plant; those at Monticello ran a shuttle service to a mine in Winfield and also interchanged with the mainline at Leesburg. Trains ran in push-pull configuration, with a small caboose cab mounted on a flatcar at the opposite end of the train from the locomotive.

The E25B locomotives were replaced in 1999 by ex-Ferrocarriles Nacionales de México E60 locomotives.
