= Monticello (disambiguation) =

Monticello is the name of Thomas Jefferson's estate near Charlottesville, Virginia in the United States.

Monticello may also refer to:

== Places ==
=== France ===
- Monticello, Haute-Corse, a commune of the Haute-Corse département in France

=== Italy ===
- Monticello Amiata, a former comune in the Province of Grosseto, now a frazione of Cinigiano
- Monticello Brianza, a comune in the Province of Lecco
- Monticello Conte Otto, a comune in the Province of Vicenza
- Monticello d'Alba, a comune in the Province of Cuneo

=== United States ===
==== Municipalities ====
- Monticello, Arkansas, a town
- Monticello, California, a former town
- Monticello, Florida, a town
- Monticello, Georgia, a town
- Monticello, Illinois, a town
- Monticello Township, Illinois
- Monticello, Indiana, a town
- Monticello, Iowa, a town
- Monticello Township, Iowa
- Monticello Township, Kansas, a former township
- Monticello, Kentucky, a town
- Monticello, Louisiana, a town
- Monticello, Maine, a town
- Monticello, Minnesota, a town
- Monticello Township, Minnesota
- Monticello, Mississippi, a town
- Monticello, Missouri, a town
- Monticello, New Mexico, an unincorporated community in Sierra County
- Monticello, New York, a hamlet also known as Richfield
- Monticello, New York, a village
- Monticello, North Carolina, a town
- Monticello, Ohio, an unincorporated community
- Monticello, South Carolina, a community
- Monticello, Utah, a town
- Monticello, Green County, Wisconsin, a village
- Monticello, Lafayette County, Wisconsin, a town
- Lake Monticello (disambiguation)
- Monticello Reservoir, South Carolina

=== Other places ===
- Monticello AVA, an American Viticultural Area in Virginia
- Monticello Dam in California

== Entertainment ==
- Monticello (fictional city), the fictional locale of the soap opera The Edge of Night
- "Monticello Hotel", an episode the television series Hotel Hell

== Business ==
- Monticello Arcade, in Norfolk, Virginia
- Monticello Hotel (Longview, Washington)
- The Monticello Hotel, in Norfolk, Virginia
- Monticello Media, a radio broadcasting company in the Charlottesville, Virginia, area

== Energy ==
- Monticello Nuclear Generating Plant, Monticello, Minnesota
- Monticello Steam Electric Station, a coal-fired power plant in Texas

== Racing ==
- Monticello Motor Club, a racing circuit near Monticello, New York
- Monticello Raceway, a harness track and racing site in Sullivan County, New York; also known as the "Mighty M"

== Ships ==
- USS Monticello, three United States Navy ships
- Monticello (privateer), a Confederate blockade runner in the American Civil War

== Other uses ==
- Monticello (typeface)
- Monticello Association, a private lineage society of lineal descendants of Thomas Jefferson
- Monticello Seminary, a former seminary, junior college and academy in Godfrey, Illinois, United States

== See also ==
- Monticelli (disambiguation)
- Montibello, residence of U.S. Senator Samuel Smith
