= Fairfield Lake State Park =

State park in Freestone County, Texas

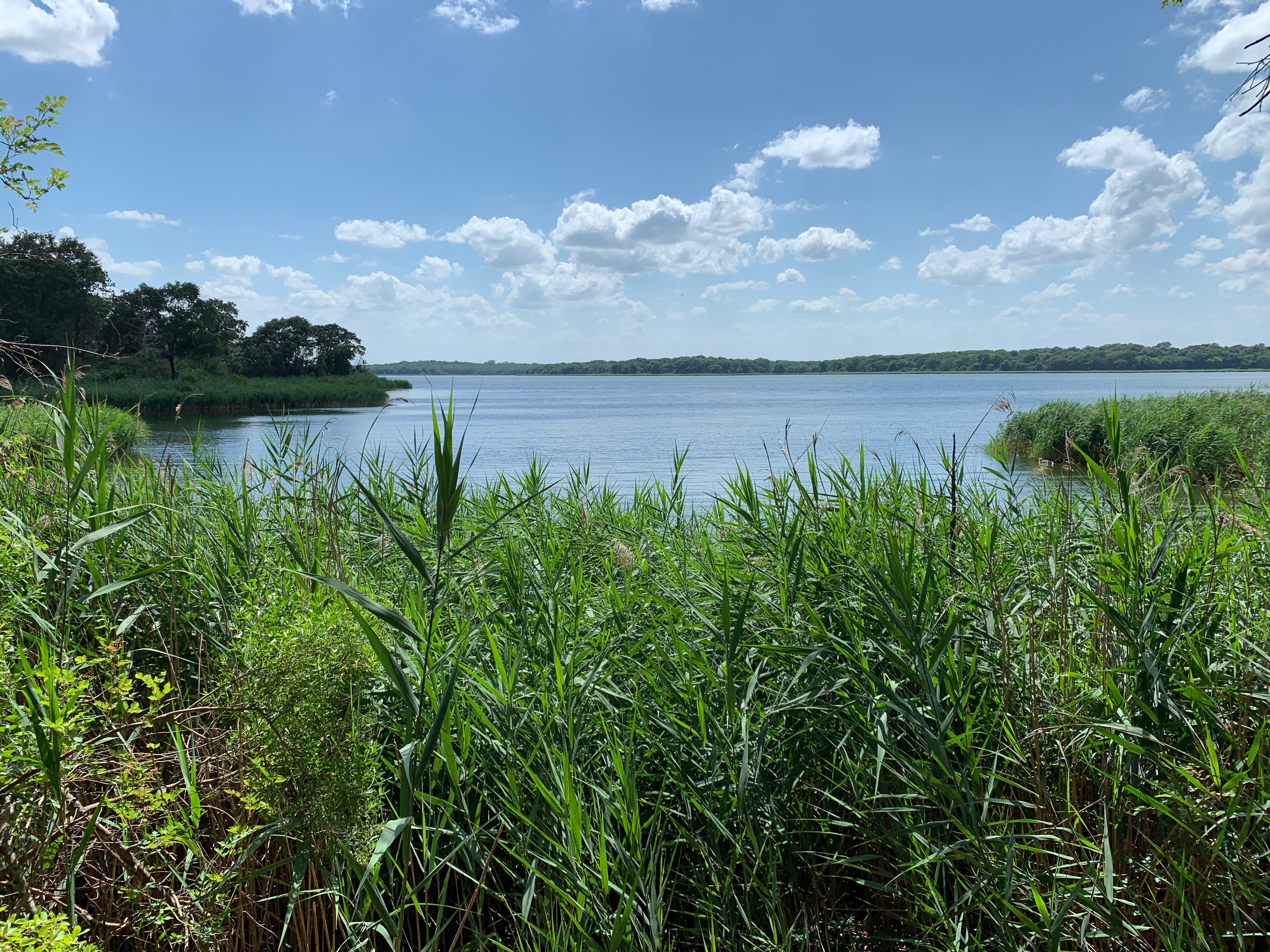
- Overlooking Fairfield Lake
- Location: Freestone County, Texas
- Nearest city: Fairfield, Texas
- Coordinates: 31°46′52″N 96°04′14″W
- Area: 1,460 acres (591 ha)
- Created: 1976
- Operator: Texas Parks and Wildlife Department
- Visitors: 82,555 (in 2022)

Fairfield Lake State Park was a state park located in Freestone County, Texas, United States, northeast of Fairfield on the shores of Fairfield Lake, the subject of a contentious battle between the Texas Parks and Wildlife Department (TPWD) (which leased and operated the park until June 2023) and a private developer (who purchased the land from the prior owner). The park is 1,460 acres (591 ha).

== History ==
The park was acquired in 1954 by a Department of Army lease, which extended it until 2004. Texas Power and Light Company (now known as Luminant) constructed a dam at Big Brown Creek to impound water as a cooling source for the nearby Big Brown Power Plant. The dam was completed in 1969. The park was opened to the public in 1976.

There are several historical locations in the park, including an historical marker located in the Chancellor Union Cemetery on the park property. This has the graves of many early settlers from the area, including Civil War, WWI, and WWII veterans. The cemetery is still actively used but not maintained by the park. In the Springfield camp loop is an old well left over from the Hill family homestead.

=== Closure and purchase offer ===
The park site was leased by TPWD from Vistra to the state for 50 years at no cost. In 2023, Vistra decided to sell the property (a total of 5,000 acres (2,000 ha) which included the park and other undeveloped land). After TPWD declined to purchase the entire acreage (it made an offer for only the park acreage, which Vistra declined) Vistra sold it to Todd Interests. Although the price that the property ultimately sold for has not been disclosed it had been listed at $110M.

It was announced in February 2023 that the park would close on February 28, 2023, after the notification was given that the lease agreement will be ending. The park would later temporarily reopen while TPWD attempted to buy out the new owners' interest for $20M with an additional $5M for the reimbursement of expenses but the park closed on June 4, 2023, so TPWD could remove its assets from the property. In response, TPWD announced a special meeting for June 10, 2023, to discuss eminent domain condemnation proceedings for the park and the remainder of the 5,000 acres (2,000 ha). At the meeting, the Commission unanimously voted to use eminent domain to acquire the property. Recognizing that the practice is highly disfavored in a state which strongly supports private landownership, the Commission also ordered the Department to develop written policies to state that eminent domain will be used in the future only in "extraordinary and unusual situations".

Under Chapter 21 of the Texas Property Code, TPWD declared its intention to acquire the land by eminent domain at the June 10 special meeting. TPWD made two offers with the final offer included an appraisal of the property TPWD is seeking to take.

TPWD did make a final offer on August 3, 2023; Todd had until August 17 to respond, but Todd rejected the offer, so TPWD filed a petition to condemn and seize the property via eminent domain. The lawsuit was filed in a district court in Freestone County, where the property is situated. A district judge would then select three property owners in the county to serve as Special Commissioners, whose only duty is to determine the fair market value of the property to be taken. Todd Interests is not required to attend the Special Commissioners' Hearing. If either TPWD or Todd Interests file timely objections to the Award of the Special Commissioners, the matter would proceed like other civil litigation matters. The Court will then set the matter for trial with a scheduling order that will include deadlines for expert reports and a deadline to mediate the matter before trial. If either TPWD or Todd Interests is not happy with the trial results, the matter could be appealed to the Texas Court of Appeals, and ultimately to the Texas Supreme Court. Barring some error in the process, it is unlikely that Todd Interests can stop TPWD from acquiring the entire property. Unless TPWD elects to not go through with the case, the only matter to decide is how much Todd Interests will be paid, and how long the process will take (Jacob Merkord, an attorney specializing in these cases stated that the process could take from "a few months" to up to three years or longer).

On 5 December 2023, TPWD declared that it will no longer pursue acquisition of the property previously occupied by Fairfield Lake State Park, now owned by FLG Owner, LLC. “TPWD recognizes the importance of conserving our state’s natural resources and providing recreational opportunities for Texans,” said TPWD Executive Director David Yoskowitz, Ph.D. “However, TPWD must also responsibly manage the state’s fiscal resources in order to maximize the benefit of our parks for all Texans. The citizens of Texas have always shown strong support for expanded access to state parks, and I believe there is a promising future for outdoor recreation in our great state.” With this decision, TPWD made clear it does not intend to exercise its power of eminent domain in the future to obtain a portion of FLG Owner’s property, including all water rights. This means that there will be no efforts to establish a state park or any other use on FLG Owner’s property. "We want to thank the staff and visitors who made Fairfield Lake State Park such a special place for the past half century, as well as those who have supported the effort to save the park,” said Texas State Parks Director Rodney Franklin.

== Recreation ==
The park offered nature programs throughout the year. It had facilities for picnicking, nature study, hiking, biking, fishing, kayaking, paddle boarding, swimming, boating, tubing, jet skiing, water skiing, wildlife observation, horseback trails, wildlife photography, group events, RV camping, tent camping, and primitive camping.

Facilities at the park included a 2,400-acre lake (970 ha), shaded picnic sites, protected swim beach, playground areas, 136 campsites, primitive camping area, dump station, outdoor amphitheater, a fishing pier, two boat launches, two fish cleaning stations, two courtesy docks, Paddle EZ kayak and paddleboard rentals, rentable dining hall, and over 18 miles (29 km) of trails to hike, bike, or explore on horseback. Each of the 136 campsites included an RV pad, standing grill, fire ring with grill, and picnic table. All three camping loops had restroom and shower facilities.

== See also ==
- List of former Texas state parks
