= Big Brown Power Plant =

- Country: United States
- Location: Freestone County, near Fairfield, Texas
- Coordinates: 31°49′14″N 96°03′22″W
- Status: Decommissioned
- Commission date: Unit 1: 1971; Unit 2: 1972
- Decommission date: Units 1–2: February 12, 2018
- Owner: Luminant

Thermal power station
- Primary fuel: Coal
- Cooling source: Fairfield Lake

Power generation
- Units operational: 2
- Nameplate capacity: 1,150 MW

Big Brown Power Plant was a 1.15-gigawatt (1,150 MW) coal power plant located northeast of Fairfield near Fairfield Lake State Park in Freestone County, Texas. It was operated by Vistra Corp's subsidiary, Luminant. The plant operated from 1971 to 2018.

== History ==
Big Brown was constructed by Texas Utilities (now known as Luminant) and went into operation in 1971. It has two units. Big Brown Creek was impounded to form the plant's cooling source. The dam was completed in 1969 creating Fairfield Lake. The power plant used lignite from the nearby Turlington Mine and later supplemented with coal from Peabody Energy's Rawhide Mine in the Powder River Basin of Wyoming. To improve the overall fuel mix and to reduce reliance on the nearby Turlington Mine whose lignite production was decreasing, coal from the Powder River Basin was blended into the fuel beginning in 2000. LO-NOx burners were installed in both boilers in 2001 to curtail nitrogen oxide (NO_{x}) emissions. NO_{x} emissions were reduced again in 2008 with selective non-catalytic reduction (SNCR) systems being retrofitted by Fluor to Big Brown's units. The plant was temporarily idled in 2011 in order to overhaul its boilers. This was to fulfill the United States Environmental Protection Agency's (EPA) Cross-State Air Pollution Rule to reduce its sulfur dioxide (SO_{2}) emissions. With the plant idling, Luminant halted lignite extraction at the nearby Turlington Mine until the plant resumed electricity generation. Claiming lignite reserves were nearly exhausted at Turlington Mine, Luminant made plans in 2014 to close the mine by 2018 and rely solely on coal from the Powder River Basin.

=== Closure ===
It was announced on October 13, 2017 that Luminant was to either shut down or sell to another concern Big Brown in early-2018 due to economic factors such as low natural gas prices and growth in renewable energy. The following month, Electric Reliability Council of Texas (ERCOT) approved of the shut down. ERCOT found the two-unit Big Brown plant was "not required to support ERCOT transmission system reliability", and authorized its closure by February 12, 2018.

== See also ==
- List of power stations in Texas
