= Monticelli =

Monticelli may refer to:

== Places in Italy ==
Municipalities (comuni)

- Monticelli Brusati, in the Province of Brescia
- Monticelli d'Ongina, in the Province of Piacenza
- Monticelli Pavese, in the Province of Pavia
- Monte San Biagio, in the province of Latina, named Monticelli until 1862

Civil parishes (frazioni)

- Monticelli (Ascoli Piceno), a quarter of Ascoli Piceno
- Monticelli (Esperia), in the municipality of Esperia (FR)
- Monticelli (Florence), a quarter of Florence
- Monticelli (Mercato San Severino), in the municipality of Mercato San Severino (SA)
- Monticelli (Olevano sul Tusciano), in the municipality of Olevano sul Tusciano (SA)
- Monticelli (Ostuni), in the municipality of Ostuni (BR)
- Monticelli (Teramo), in the municipality of Teramo
- Monticelli Terme, in the municipality of Montechiarugolo (PR)

== Other uses ==
- Monticelli (surname)

== See also ==
- Monticello (disambiguation)
