= Oak Grove Power Plant =

Coal-fired power plant in Robertson County, Texas

- Country: United States
- Location: Robertson County, near Franklin, Texas
- Coordinates: 31°10′53″N 96°29′17″W
- Status: Operational
- Commission date: Unit 1: 2010 (917 MW); Unit 2: 2011 (879 MW)
- Owner: Luminant

Thermal power station
- Primary fuel: Coal (Lignite)
- Cooling source: Twin Oaks Reservoir

Power generation
- Nameplate capacity: 1,796 MW

Oak Grove Power Plant is a 1.79-gigawatt (1,796 MW), coal power plant located north of Franklin, Texas in Robertson County, Texas. The plant is operated by Vistra Energy. It began operations in 2010.

== History ==
Plans for Oak Grove began in the 1970s as Texas Power & Light (a forerunner of Luminant) and Alcoa made an agreement to jointly operate a power plant named Twin Oak Steam Electric Station in Robertson County. The plan was to construct two, 750 MW units to burn lignite and be ready for commercial generation by 1981. The electricity generated would run to Alcoa's aluminium smelting facility in Palestine, Texas. Twin Oaks Reservoir was developed by impounding Duck Creek in 1982 to act as a cooling source for the plant. In 1983, Alcoa attempted to sell its stake in Twin Oak to Halliburton who was seeking electricity to offer to the owners of the troubled South Texas Nuclear Generating Station. Ultimately, Alcoa sold its stake back to Texas Utilities in 1984. As electricity demand in Texas stagnated, construction on Twin Oak continued to be deferred until the air permit was withdrawn in 1994.

The plant was renamed from Twin Oak to Oak Grove when construction restarted in 2007 by Luminant. Construction resumed in order to meet future electricity demand and following the Texas Commission on Environmental Quality (TCEQ) granting Luminant a new air permit for Oak Grove. The plant was reconfigured and redesigned to meet current emissions requirements. This included the addition of selective catalytic reduction (SCR) systems to reduce nitrogen oxide (NO_{x}) emissions and activated carbon which prevents mercury from being released. After Fluor completed the necessary construction work, Unit 1 came online in December 2009 and Unit 2 came online in June 2010. Oak Grove utilizes lignite extracted from the nearby Kosse Mine.

== See also ==
- List of power stations in Texas
- List of largest power stations in the United States
