= Denarius Moore =

American football player (born 1988)

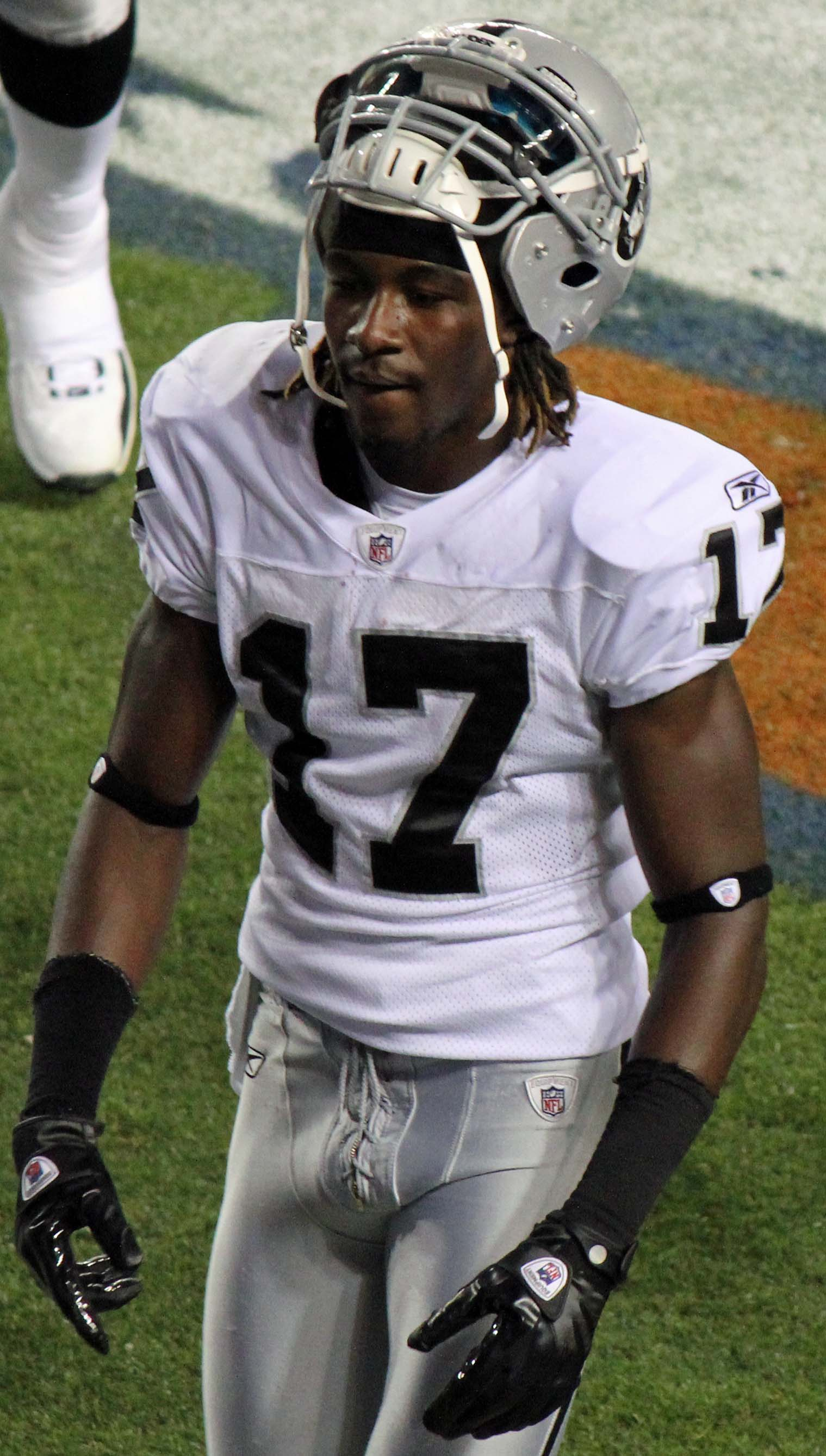
- Moore with the Oakland Raiders in 2011

No. 17
- Position: Wide receiver

Personal information
- Born: December 9, 1988 (age 37); Tatum, Texas, U.S.
- Listed height: 6 ft 0 in (1.83 m)
- Listed weight: 190 lb (86 kg)

Career information
- High school: Tatum
- College: Tennessee
- NFL draft: 2011: 5th round, 148th overall pick

Career history
- Oakland Raiders (2011–2014); Cincinnati Bengals (2015)*; Buffalo Bills (2015)
- * Offseason or practice squad member only

Career NFL statistics
- Receptions: 142
- Receiving yards: 2,169
- Receiving touchdowns: 17
- Rushing yards: 57
- Rushing touchdowns: 1
- Stats at Pro Football Reference

Denarius Earl Moore (born December 9, 1988) is an American former professional American football wide receiver in the National Football League (NFL). He played college football for the Tennessee Volunteers and was selected by the Oakland Raiders in the fifth round of the 2011 NFL draft.

== Early life ==
Born Darnius Earl Moore, Denarius Moore legally changed his first name when he was a senior in high school. He attended Tatum High School in Tatum, Texas, where he was a letterman in football, track and basketball. In football, he was coached by Andy Evans. As junior, he totaled 27 receptions for 423 yards and eight touchdowns, while also adding 287 rushing yards with two touchdowns on the ground. As senior, he caught 32 passes for 501 yards and rushed 27 times for more than 200 yards. He was named twice Class 2A Texas sportswriters first-team All-State as a kickoff returner, Second-team Reebok Super Team as a cornerback and was an PrepStar All-America. In basketball, he was the starting point guard, and averaged 20.1 points per game.

Moore also competed in track & field while at Tatum, where he was one of the state's top performers in the hurdling events. He captured two state titles at the 2006 TX State 3A, winning the 110-meter hurdles, with a time of 13.73 seconds, and the 300-meter hurdles, with a time of 37.33 seconds. In 2007, he set a new school record in the 110-metres hurdles event by clocking a 13.69 at the TX State 2A OUT, on his way to another state title win. In that same meet, he took gold in the 300-metres hurdles, with a PR of 36.99 seconds, and also earned a second-place finish in the long jump, recording a career-best jump of 7.25 meters. He was also a member of the Tatum 4 × 400 m relay squad.

== College career ==
Moore attended and played college football at the University of Tennessee. He contributed on the field from 2007 to 2010. He scored two touchdowns in a game against Memphis in the 2009 season.

On September 4, 2010, in the regular season opener against Tennessee-Martin, Moore had a receiving and rushing touchdown in the win. On September 25, he had two receiving touchdowns against UAB. On October 30, against South Carolina, he had six receptions for 228 yards and a touchdown. On November 27, in a win over Kentucky, he had seven receptions for 205 yards and a touchdown. In the 2010 season, he had 47 receptions for 981 yards and nine touchdowns. His nine receiving touchdowns tied for the lead in the SEC.

== Professional career ==
=== 2011 NFL draft ===
Pre-draft measurables
| Height | Weight | Arm length | Hand span | Wingspan | 40-yard dash | 10-yard split | 20-yard split | 20-yard shuttle | Three-cone drill | Vertical jump | Broad jump | Bench press |
|---|---|---|---|---|---|---|---|---|---|---|---|---|
| 5 ft 11 5/8 in (1.82 m) | 194 lb (88 kg) | 33 in (0.84 m) | 9 1/2 in (0.24 m) | 6 ft 5 in (1.96 m) | 4.39 s | 1.56 s | 2.53 s | 4.15 s | 6.78 s | 36.0 in (0.91 m) | 9 ft 10 in (3.00 m) | 13 reps |
All values from NFL Combine/Pro Day

=== Oakland Raiders ===
Moore was selected by the Oakland Raiders in the fifth round with the (148th pick overall) of the 2011 NFL draft. After a strong Training camp and Preseason, Moore made the Oakland Raiders 53-man roster.

In just his second career game, Moore exploded against the Buffalo Bills in Week 2 of the 2011 NFL season, making spectacular catches over the course of the game recording 146 yards on five catches and scoring a 50-yard touchdown on a pass from Quarterback Jason Campbell while also adding one rush for 25 yards. In Week 10 against the Chargers, he had five receptions for 123 yards and two touchdowns in the 24–17 victory. In Week 17, against the Chargers, he had three receptions for 101 yards. He finished the 2011 season with 33 receptions for 618 yards and five touchdowns in 13 games and ten starts.

In Week 6 of the 2012 season, Moore had five receptions for 104 yards and one touchdown. He finished the 2012 season with 51 receptions for 741 yards and seven touchdowns in 15 games and starts.

In Week 3 of the 2013 season, Moore had six receptions for 124 yards and a touchdown in the loss to the Broncos. He finished the 2013 season with 46 receptions for 695 yards and five touchdowns in 13 games and ten starts.

Moore's playing time declined in the 2014 season, recording only 115 yards on twelve receptions.

=== Cincinnati Bengals ===
On April 6, 2015, Moore signed one-year deal with the Cincinnati Bengals. Moore was released by the Bengals on August 31, as part of the first wave of roster cuts for the preseason.

=== Buffalo Bills ===
On October 7, 2015, Moore signed with the Buffalo Bills. On November 25, he was released after six games with the team.
