= Larry Wilde =

American actor (1928–2023)

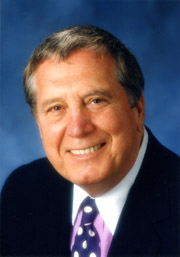
- Photo by Gregory Wutke
- Born: Herman Wildman; February 6, 1928; Jersey City, New Jersey, U.S.
- Died: September 3, 2023 (aged 95)
- Other name: The Crown Prince of Platform Humor
- Occupations: Comedian; actor; author; motivational speaker; humor historian
- Years active: 1938–2023
- Known for: Performances in Nightclubs, Concerts, Cruise Ships, Conferences, Conventions, and as an Executive Coach
- Spouses: Dana Slawson (1955-1957); Julie Heater (1968-1971); Maryruth Poulos (1974-present)

Larry Wilde (born Herman Wildman, February 6, 1928 – September 3, 2023) was an American actor, comedian, motivational speaker, university instructor and publisher. He is best known as the author of 53 books of humor.

== Biography ==
Larry Wilde, born Herman Wildman, in Jersey City, New Jersey, was the fourth child of Jewish parents Gertrude and Selig Wildman. His siblings were Milton, Benjamin, and Miriam. He chose Larry Wilde as a professional name when he began a career in show business.

Wilde attended Lincoln High School where he was active in numerous extracurricular activities, including sports editor of the school paper, the Drama Club, president of the student body and the swimming team where he became the Jersey City 100-yard breaststroke champion.

From 1946 to 1948 he was in the Second Marine Division. While stationed at Camp Lejeune, North Carolina, he wrote, produced, directed and performed in camp stage shows doing comedy routines. Promoted to corporal, he became the first official Marine Corps "non-commissioned comedian".

Wilde graduated from the University of Miami in Florida where he worked his way through school performing at Miami Beach nightclubs and hotels.

Wilde died on September 3, 2023, at the age of 95.

== Works ==
Wilde was the president of Poets, Essayists and Novelists (PEN) Los Angeles 1981–1983.

In 1976, he founded National Humor Month, celebrated annually in April. It is designed to heighten public awareness on how the joy and therapeutic value of laughter can improve health, boost morale, increase communication skills and enrich the quality of one's life. National Humor Month has been recognized by comedians and institutions across the US including The Huffington Post, Fox News (when the comedian Crystal Powell hosted citywide events in Houston), The Farmer's Almanac and USA Today. With book sales over 12 million copies, The New York Times has called him "America’s Best Selling Humorist".

Wilde's book Great Comedians Talk About Comedy contains inspirational interviews with seventeen great comedians of the 20th century, revealing their secrets on extracting laughter from audiences. The comedians interviewed are Woody Allen, Jack Benny, Milton Berle, Shelley Berman, Joey Bishop, George Burns, Johnny Carson, Maurice Chevalier, Phyllis Diller, Jimmy Durante, Dick Gregory, Bob Hope, George Jessel, Jerry Lewis, Jerry Seinfeld, Danny Thomas and Ed Wynn. The original tapes of these historical interviews are now part of The Larry Wilde Collection housed in the Library of Congress.

Wilde's book How the Great Comedy Writers Create Laughter is a collection of dialogues with the writers who originate comedy for the stage, television, motion pictures, and print publications. They include Goodman Ace, Art Buchwald, Abe Burrows, Mel Brooks, Bill Dana, Selma Diamond, Jack Douglas, Norman Lear, Hal Kanter, Carl Reiner and Neil Simon.

=== Discography ===
- The Joker is Wilde Dot Records
- The Official Polish/Italian Comedy Album

=== Filmography ===
Television
Year	Title	Episode	Role
1958	U.S. Steel Hour	Mid-Summer	Song-and Dance Man
1966	Art Linkletter's Hollywood Talent Scouts		Himself
1968	The Donald O'Connor Show		Himself
1968	The Della Reese Show		Himself
1968	The Woody Woodbury Show	Episode dated 7 March 1968	Himself
1968-1969	The Mike Douglas Show	Several episodes	Himself
1969	The Merv Griffin Show		Himself
1970	The Barbara McNair Show	Episode dated 8 February 1970	Himself
1971	Dan August		Patrolman
1972	Adam-12	The Tip	Milton Waters
1972	Sanford and Son	Steinberg and Son	Saul Green
1973	Barnaby Jones	See Some Evil... Do Some Evil	Customer
1976	The Lindbergh Kidnapping Case		Third voice
1973-1976	Mary Tyler Moore		Emcee
1973		Lou's First Date	Master of Ceremonies
1974		Ted Baxter Meets Walter Cronkite	"Teddy" Presenter
1975		You Can't Lose 'em All	Master of Ceremonies
1976		Sue Ann Falls in Love	Master of Ceremonies
1976		Murray Can't Lose	Master of Ceremonies
1978	Rhoda	The Date in the Iron Mask	Emcee

=== Books ===
- The Official Polish/Italian Joke Book, Pinnacle, 1973
- The Official Jewish/Irish Joke Book, Pinnacle, 1974
- More The Official Polish/Italian Joke Book, Pinnacle, 1975
- The Official Black Folks/White Folks Joke Book, Pinnacle, 1975
- The Official Virgins/Sex Maniacs Joke Book, Pinnacle, 1975
- The Official Democrat/Republican Joke Book, Pinnacle, 1976
- The Official Religious/Not So Religious Joke Book, Pinnacle, 1976
- How the Great Comedy Writers Create Laughter, Nelson Hall, 1976
- The Official Golfers Joke Book, Pinnacle, 1977
- The Official Smart Kids/Dumb Parents Joke Book, Pinnacle, 1977
- Last Official Polish Joke Book, Pinnacle, 1977
- The Official Cat Lovers/Dog Lovers Joke Book, Pinnacle, 1978
- The Official Dirty Joke Book, Pinnacle, 1978
- The Last Official Italian Joke Book, Pinnacle, 1978
- The Complete Book of Ethnic Humor, Pinnacle, 1978
- More Official Jewish/Irish Joke Book, Pinnacle, 1979
- The Official Book of Sick Jokes, Pinnacle, 1979
- More Official Smart Kids/Dumb Parents Joke Book, Pinnacle, 1979
- Last Official Jewish Joke Book, Bantam, 1980
- More Official Democrat/Republican Joke Book, Pinnacle, 1980
- The Official Bedroom/Bathroom Joke Book, Pinnacle, 1980
- The Official Doctors Joke Book, Bantam, 1981
- More The Official Sex Maniacs Joke Book, Bantam, 1981
- The Official Lawyers Joke Book, Bantam, 1982
- Last Official Sex Maniacs Joke Book, Bantam, 1982
- Larry Wilde Book of Limericks, Bantam, 1982
- The Absolutely Last Official Polish Joke Book, Bantam, 1983
- The Last Official Smart Kids Joke Book, Bantam, 1983
- Last Official Irish Joke Book, Bantam, 1983
- The Official Politicians Joke Book, Bantam, 1984
- The Official Rednecks Joke Book, Bantam, 1984
- Absolutely Last Official Sex Maniacs Joke Book, Bantam, 1985
- The Official Book of John Jokes, Bantam, 1985
- The Official Sports Maniacs Joke Book, Bantam, 1985
- More The Official Doctors Joke Book, Bantam, 1986
- The Official Executives Joke Book, Bantam, 1986
- Ultimate Jewish Joke Book, Bantam, 1986
- The Ultimate Lawyers Joke Book, Bantam, 1987
- The Official WASP Joke Book, Bantam. 1988
- The Official All America Joke Book, Bantam, 1988
- The Larry Wilde Library of Laughter, Jester Press, 1988
- The Ultimate Sex Maniacs Joke Book, Bantam, 1989
- The Ultimate Book of Ethnic Humor, Bantam, 1989
- The Official Computer Freaks Joke Book (with Steve Wozniak), Bantam, 1989
- The Ultimate Pet Lovers Joke Book, Bantam, 1990
- The Merriest Book of Christmas Humor, Bantam, 1991
- The Official Locker Room Joke Book, Bantam, 1991
- The Official Golf Lovers Joke Book, Bantam, 1992
- The Dumb, Dumber, Dumbest Joke Book, Pinnacle, 1996
- You're Never Too Old To Laugh, Pinnacle, 1997
- When You’re Up to Your Eyeballs In Alligators, Jester Press, 2000 (revised 2006)
- Great Comedians Talk About Comedy, Citadel Press, 1968 (revised) Executive Books/Jester Press, 2000
- The Larry Wilde Treasury of Laughter, Jester Press, 2006
