= Tatum, Texas =

City in Rusk and Panola counties in Texas, United States

- City
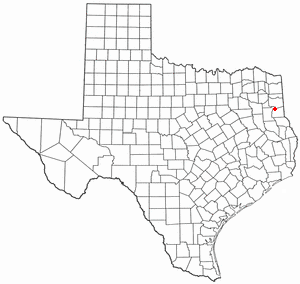
- Location of Tatum, Texas

- Coordinates: 32°18′54″N 94°30′42″W
- Country: United States
- State: Texas
- Counties: Rusk, Panola

Area
  - Total: 3.78 sq mi (9.80 km^{2})
  - Land: 3.78 sq mi (9.80 km^{2})
  - Water: 0 sq mi (0.00 km^{2})
- Elevation: 322 ft (98 m)

Population (2020)
  - Total: 1,342
  - Density: 365.9/sq mi (141.28/km^{2})
- Time zone: UTC-6 (Central (CST))
  - Summer (DST): UTC-5 (CDT)
- ZIP code: 75691
- Area codes: 903, 430
- FIPS code: 48-71924
- GNIS feature ID: 2412034
- Website: tatum.texas.gov

Tatum is a city in Rusk and Panola counties in Texas, United States. Its population was 1,342 at the 2020 census.

== History ==
Tatum was settled in the 1840s by Albert Tatum and his second wife, Mary C. (Rippetoe) Tatum. In 1848, they built a large plantation there. In 1885, the Santa Fe Railway came through, and the town was divided into individual lots. One of their sons, Paul "Uncle Fox" Tatum, who studied architecture in New York, laid out the streets. He became the postmaster in 1886. The city of Tatum lies along Trammel's Trace, an old trade route; a marker at the south end of town commemorates it. In the city park stands the restored Santa Fe depot.

Albert Tatum was born on August 12, 1810, in Hancock County, Georgia, the son of William Tatum and Alice B. (Dent) Tatum. Albert Tatum first married Rebecca Elizabeth Ann Menefee about 1837 in Chambers County, Alabama. They were the parents of one son, William C. Tatum, who was born on June 25, 1838, in Chambers County, Alabama.

After the death of his first wife on December 31, 1840, in Chambers County, Albert Tatum married Mary C. Rippetoe on September 22, 1841, in Tallapoosa County, Alabama. At one time, Albert Tatum owned over 4,000 acres (16 km^{2}) of land around the current town of Tatum.

After the town's first bank was established in 1903, things got bad early in the 20th century, as a tornado destroyed part of the town in 1904. The next year, a fire destroyed almost all of the north side of town.

== Geography ==
According to the United States Census Bureau, the city has a total area of 3.8 square miles (9.8 km^{2}), all land.

=== Climate ===
The climate in this area is characterized by hot, humid summers and generally mild to cool winters. According to the Köppen climate classification, Tatum has a humid subtropical climate, Cfa on climate maps.

== Demographics ==
Historical population
Census	Pop.	Note	%±
1940	427		—
1950	599		40.3%
1960	542		−9.5%
1970	684		26.2%
1980	1,339		95.8%
1990	1,289		−3.7%
2000	1,175		−8.8%
2010	1,385		17.9%
2020	1,342		−3.1%
U.S. Decennial Census

=== 2020 census ===
As of the 2020 census, Tatum had a population of 1,342, with 498 households and 320 families residing in the city.

The median age was 33.1 years. 31.5% of residents were under the age of 18 and 12.9% of residents were 65 years of age or older. For every 100 females there were 89.5 males, and for every 100 females age 18 and over there were 79.8 males age 18 and over.

Of the 498 households, 47.4% had children under the age of 18 living in them. Of all households, 44.6% were married-couple households, 14.9% were households with a male householder and no spouse or partner present, and 35.1% were households with a female householder and no spouse or partner present. About 22.7% of all households were made up of individuals and 10.6% had someone living alone who was 65 years of age or older.

There were 561 housing units, of which 11.2% were vacant. The homeowner vacancy rate was 2.8% and the rental vacancy rate was 8.6%.

0.0% of residents lived in urban areas, while 100.0% lived in rural areas.

Racial composition as of the 2020 census
Race	Number	Percent
White	825	61.5%
Black or African American	223	16.6%
American Indian and Alaska Native	5	0.4%
Asian	4	0.3%
Native Hawaiian and Other Pacific Islander	0	0.0%
Some other race	149	11.1%
Two or more races	136	10.1%
Hispanic or Latino (of any race)	328	24.4%

=== 2000 census ===
As of the census of 2000, 1,175 people, 459 households, and 324 families resided in the city. The population density was 309.9 inhabitants per square mile (119.7/km^{2}). The 523 housing units averaged 137.9 units per square mile (53.2 units/km^{2}). The racial makeup of the city was 73.62% White, 16.43% African American, 0.51% Native American, 0.09% Pacific Islander, 7.15% from other races, and 2.21% from two or more races. Hispanics or Latinos of any race were 17.62% of the population.

Of the 459 households, 35.3% had children under the age of 18 living with them, 52.1% were married couples living together, 13.5% had a female householder with no husband present, and 29.4% were not families. About 27.5% of all households were made up of individuals, and 13.9% had someone living alone who was 65 years of age or older. The average household size was 2.56 and the average family size was 3.14.

In the city, the population was distributed as 28.9% under 18, 10.0% from 18 to 24, 27.3% from 25 to 44, 21.3% from 45 to 64, and 12.5% who were 65 or older. The median age was 33 years. For every 100 females, there were 90.4 males. For every 100 females 18 and over, there were 84.7 males.

The median income for a household in the city was $25,000, and for a family was $30,119. Males had a median income of $26,719 versus $19,063 for females. The per capita income for the city was $13,181. About 20.4% of families and 25.4% of the population were below the poverty line, including 34.8% of those under age 18 and 20.2% of those age 65 or over.

== Education ==
All of Tatum in Rusk County is in the Tatum Independent School District. Tatum in Panola County is also in Tatum ISD.

The portion of Tatum ISD not in Panola County is in the service area of Kilgore Junior College, while the portion in Panola County is in the service area of Panola College. The campuses include:

- Tatum High School

== Attractions ==
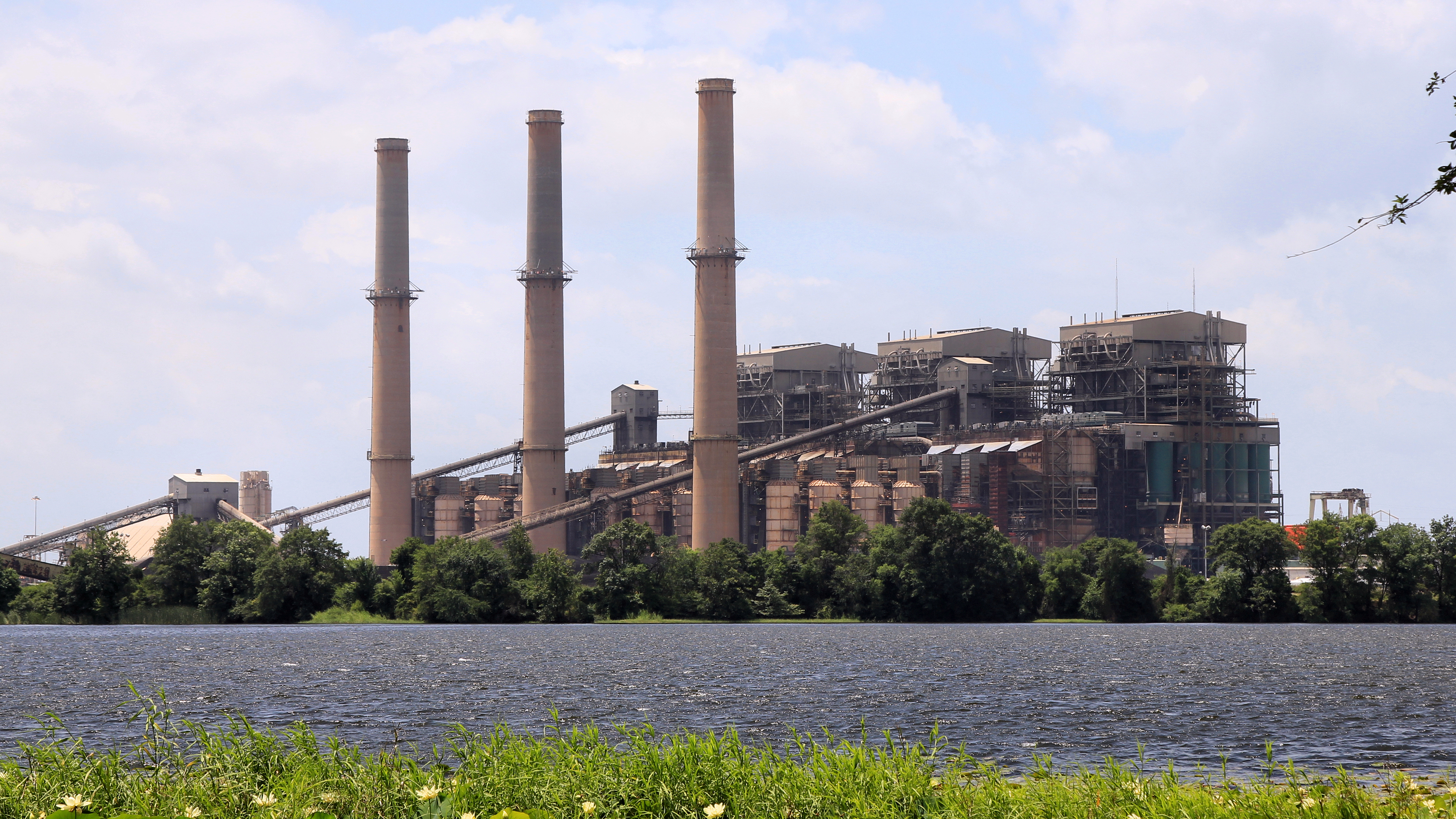
Martin Lake Power Plant in Tatum Texas

Martin Creek Lake State Park is located 4 miles (6 km) southeast of Tatum. The park was deeded to the Texas Parks and Wildlife Department by Texas Utilities and opened to the public in 1976. The park is located on 5,000-acre (20 km^{2}) Martin Creek Lake, constructed to provide cooling water for the lignite-fired Martin Lake Power Plant. Martin Creek Lake State Park provides excellent, year-round fishing, camping, wildlife observation and photography, picnicking, boating, water skiing, unsupervised lake swimming, backpacking, and hiking. Annual events at Martin Creek Lake State Park include Christmas in the Piney Woods (first weekend in December), Fourth of July Bike Parade, and the Annual Family Easter Egg Hunt. The park also offers regular programs most weekends, including Geocaching 101, Dutch Oven Cooking (4th Saturday of every month), Guided Hikes, Guided Paddling Programs, Star Gazing, and Art in the Parks craft programs.

== Major highways ==
- SH 43 State Highway 43
- SH 149 State Highway 149
- FM 1797 Farm to Market Road 1797
- FM 3231 Farm to Market Road 3231

== Notable people ==
- Bob Allen, former pitcher for the Cleveland Indians
- Larry Centers, NFL running back
- Denarius Moore, Oakland Raiders wide receiver
- Crystal Powell, actress and comedienne

== See also ==
- List of municipalities in Texas
