= Martin Lake Power Plant =

Coal-fired power plant in Rusk County, Texas

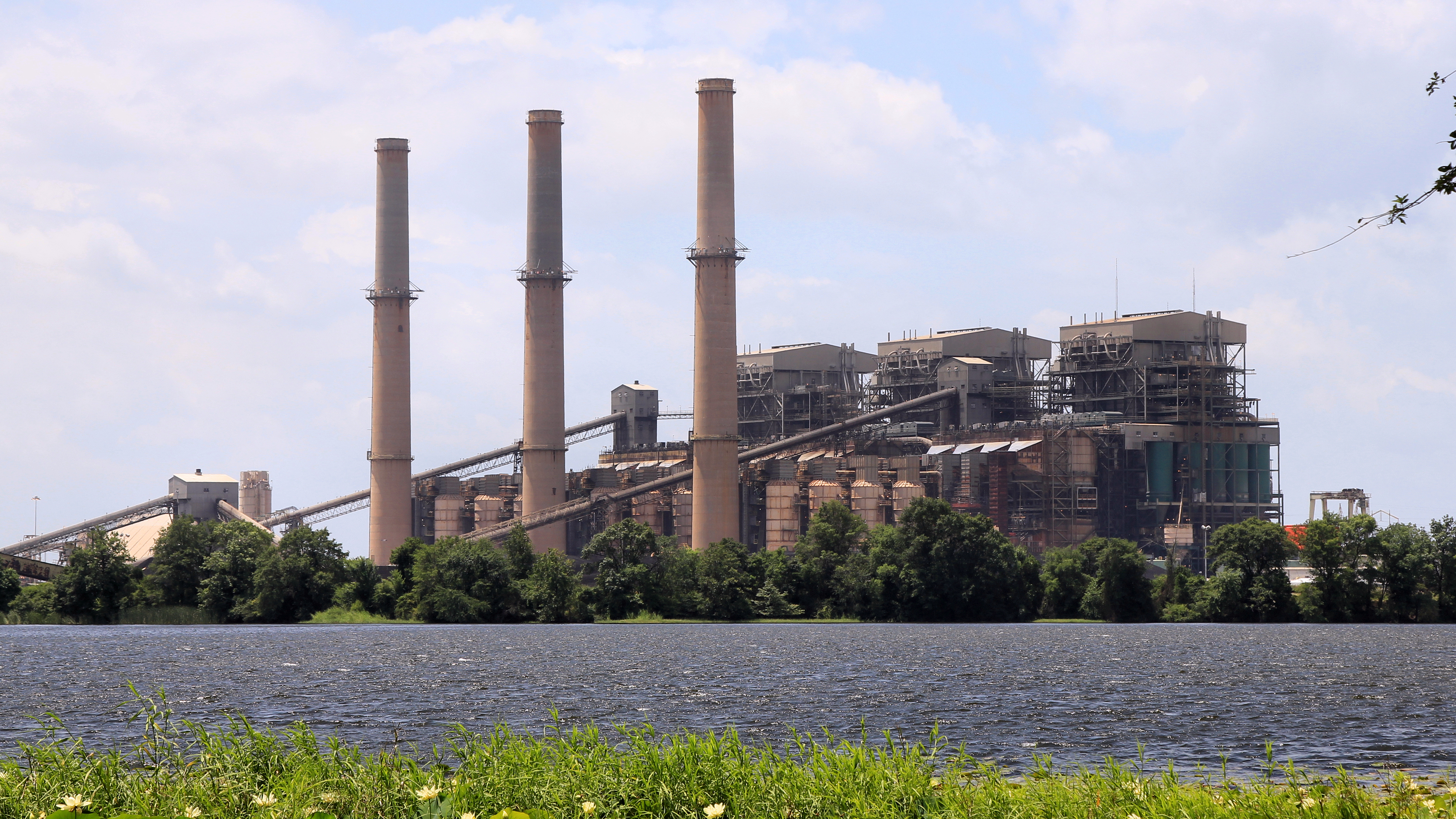
- Martin Lake Power Plant viewed from Martin Creek Lake State Park
- Country: United States
- Location: Rusk County, Texas
- Coordinates: 32°15′42″N 94°33′53″W
- Status: Operational
- Commission date: Unit 1: 1977; Unit 2: 1978; Unit 3: 1979
- Owners: Luminant, a division of Vistra Corp

Thermal power station
- Primary fuel: Coal (Lignite)
- Cooling source: Martin Lake

Power generation
- Nameplate capacity: 2,250 MW

Martin Lake Power Plant is a 2,250-megawatt coal power plant located southwest of Tatum, Texas, in Rusk County, Texas. The plant is owned by Luminant. It began operations in 1977. The plant is also served by the Luminant owned Martin Lake Line, shuttling coal from nearby as well as the Powder River Basin in Wyoming via BNSF.

== History ==
The plant consists of three units. Unit 1 was commissioned in 1977, Unit 2 in 1978, and Unit 3 in 1979. All three, when first activated, each unit had a capacity of 750 MW. Plans for a fourth, 858 MW coal unit at Martin Lake was formally cancelled in 1986. A man-made lake was created for the plant's cooling source. Martin Lake was retrofitted with selective catalytic reduction (SCR) systems by Fluor in 2008 to reduce nitrogen oxide (NO_{x}) emissions.

Martin Lake receives its energy from nearby lignite mines and coal from the Powder River Basin in Wyoming. Martin Lake used to receive lignite from the Oak Hill and Beckville Mines in nearby Rusk and Panola Counties until their closures.

One of Martin Lake's units was idled in September 2013 due to low electricity prices. The unit was restarted in March 2014 as electricity prices rose during the 2014 North American cold wave.

== Incidents ==
In February 2017, a contractor died in an accident at the site.

== See also ==
- List of largest power stations in the United States
- List of power stations in Texas
