= List of former Texas state parks =

This is a list of former state parks in Texas, United States, the year they were established and what they reverted to.

Central Texas museums
Park name	Established	Disbanded	County	Current name	Notes/Refs
San Jacinto State Park	1907	?	Harris	San Jacinto Battleground State Historic Site	
Fannin State Park	1913	2008	Goliad	Fannin Battleground State Historic Site	
Gonzales State Park	1913	?	Gonzales	Unknown	
Beeville State Park	1915?	?	Bee	Kohler Park	
King State Park	1915	?	Refugio	Public Square in Refugio	
Washington State Park	1915	?	Washington	Washington-on-the-Brazos State Historic Site	
Boerne-Hallie Maude Neff State Park	1924	1933	Kendall	Unknown	
Van Horn State Park	1927	?	Culberson	Unknown	
Clifton State Park	1933	1934	Bosque	Clifton City Park	
Grayson State Park	1933	?	Grayson	Loy Park	
Hamilton State Park	1933	?	Hamilton	Unknown	
Lampasas State Park	1933	1941	Lampasas	Horseshoe Falls Ranch	
Mineral Wells State Park	1933	?	Palo Pinto	Texas Frontier Trails Western Heritage Park	
Normangee State Park	1933	1950s	Leon	Normangee City Park	
Palisades State Park	1933	1939	Randall	Starlight Canyon Bed & Breakfast	
Stephenville State Park	1933	1948	Erath	Garner Park Ranch	
Texas Canyons State Park	1933	1944	Brewster	Big Bend National Park	Renamed Big Bend State Park in 1933
Tres Palacios State Park	1933	?	Matagorda	Unknown	
Kerrville-Schreiner State Park	1936	2004	Kerr	Kerrville-Schreiner Park	
Fort Stockton State Park	?	?	Pecos	Unknown	
Mackenzie State Park	?	?	Lubbock	Mackenzie Park	
Avalon State Park	?	?	Bandera	Bandera County Medina Lake Park	Texas Park Road 37 still in commission even though state park is not.
Brazos Island State Park	1957	2007	Cameron	Brazos Island	Transferred by lease to Lower Rio Grande Valley National Wildlife Refuge
Fairfield Lake State Park	1976	2023	Freestone	Freestone	Lease not renewed. Land acquired by private developer
Lewisville State Park	1981	1995?	Denton	Hidden Cove Park	
Boca Chica State Park	1994	2007	Cameron	Boca Chica Beach	Transferred by lease to Lower Rio Grande Valley National Wildlife Refuge

== See also ==
- List of Texas state parks
