= Monticello, Texas =

Unincorporated community in Texas, US

Monticello
- Unincorporated community
- Location in Texas
- Coordinates: 33°05′45″N 95°05′09″W
- Country: United States
- U.S. state: Texas
- County: Titus
- Settled: 1850s
- Incorporated: 1974
- Named for: Lake Monticello
- Elevation: 420 ft (130 m)

Population (2000)
  - Total: 20
- USGS Feature ID: 1341840

Monticello is an unincorporated community in Titus County, Texas, United States.

== History ==
Monticello is situated on Farm to Market Road 127. It is named for Lake Monticello, which is located southward. The town was settled in the 1850s, and a post office opened in 1857, with Cicero J. Corder serving as the first postmaster. By 1890, it had a population of 40, and had a brick factory, a school, two gins, two stores and two mills, one a steam mill operated by Theodore Stewig, which was the largest business. All but one store remained by 1896. The population remained consistent until 1974, when it was incorporated with a population of 174. As of 2000, the population was 20.
