= Lake Monticello =

Lake Monticello may refer to:

- Lake Monticello, Virginia, a community and lake
- Lake Monticello (Arkansas), a man-made lake in Monticello, Arkansas
- Lake Monticello (Texas), a lake near Mount Pleasant, Texas
- Monticello Lake, a lake near Monticello, Utah

== See also ==
- Monticello Reservoir, in South Carolina
