= Rawhide Mine =

Coal mine in Gillette, Wyoming, United States

Rawhide
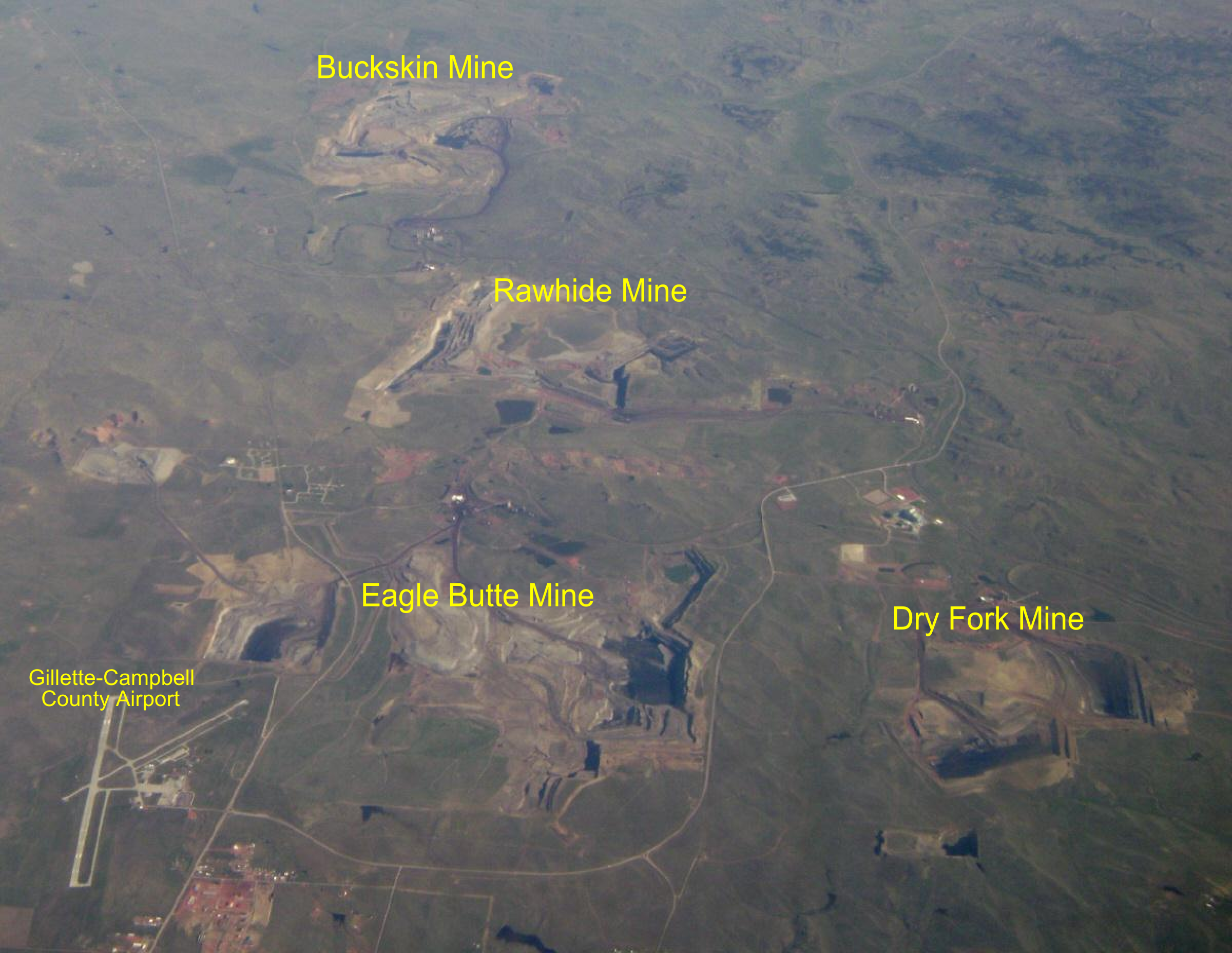
- Coal mines north and east of Gillette–Campbell County Airport, including the Rawhide Mine

- Location in Wyoming
- Location: Wyoming, United States; 44°25′08″N 105°30′45″W
- Products: Coal
- Opened: 1977
- Company: Peabody Energy
- Website: www.peabodyenergy.com
- Acquired: 1994

The Rawhide Mine is a coal mine located 10 miles (16.1 km) north of Gillette, Wyoming in the United States in the coal-rich Powder River Basin. The mine is an open pit mine that utilizes a combination of cast blast/dozer push and truck/shovel mining methods to strip an average of 165 feet (50.3m) of overburden off of approximately 105 (32.0m) feet of coal. Rawhide produces a low-sulfur, sub-bituminous coal from the Roland and Smith seams. This coal is used for domestic energy generation and shipped to customers via railroad. The mine is currently owned and operated by Peabody Energy.

As of 2009, Rawhide had reserves of 388,000,000 tons (352,000,000 tonnes) of sub-bituminous coal and a maximum permitted production capacity of 24,000,000 tons per year. Typical annual production has been in 12–18 mm ton range for the last several years though. In 2010, the mine produced just over 11,225,000 million short tons of coal, making it the 13th-largest producer of coal in the United States.

The average quality of the coal shipped from Rawhide is 8,300 BTU/lb, 0.37% sulfur, 5.40% ash, and 1.60% sodium (of the ash).

Train loading at the Rawhide mine is done in two passes. The first pass flood-loads the majority of the coal into the rail car while it is under the mine's silos, while a second pass tops off the car to its final target weight ± 250 lbs. Silo capacity at the mine's rail loop, which can accommodate up to three unit trains, is 78,000 tons. The mine also has an intermediate coal silo that has an 18,000-ton capacity for 10"- run of mine coal and loads trains.

== History ==
The Rawhide Mine shipped its first train of coal in 1977 after beginning pre-production work in 1974. Rawhide mine was previously owned by the Carter Mining Company, a subsidiary of Exxon, before being purchased by Peabody Energy on November 1, 1994. Peabody Energy runs the Rawhide Mine via its wholly owned subsidiary, the Caballo Coal Company.

Production at the mine has been continuous since its opening except for an 18-month period beginning in late 1999, when the mine was idled due to market conditions. Mining operations resumed at Rawhide in 2001 with coal shipments resuming in 2002.

In 1982, Rawhide mine was the recipient of the Sentinels of Safety Award from the Mine Safety and Health Administration (MSHA), in the large surface coal mine category. The Sentinels of Safety is awarded annually by MSHA to the safest mine in each of several categories.

Approximately 30% of Rawhide Mine's production was sent to Monticello Steam Electric Station in Texas before closing in January 2018. Another customer from Texas, Big Brown Power Plant, closed the following month.

== Production ==
Year	Coal production	Employees
2018	9,504,750	110
2017	10,346,144	101
2016	8,079,139	85
2015	15,167,996	193
2014	15,473,474	212
2013	14,246,329	203
2012	14,721,376	212
2011	15,011,017	223
2010	11,229,907	180
2009	15,842,274	227
2008	18,409,307	219
2007	17,155,361	234
2006	17,092,993	170
2005	12,430,351	131
2004	6,869,989	69
2003	3,632,940	32
2002	3,484,619	23
2001	0	8
2000	0	2
1999	807,892	19
1998	5,390,400	63
1997	10,705,680	157
1996	15,068,358	166
1995	15,355,000	166
1994	12,858,787	176
1993	9,863,923	181
1992	8,629,624	192
1991	11,767,143	192
1990	11,438,719	177
1989	10,628,737	173
1988	10,810,785	167
1987	10,672,913	174
1986	12,403,975	180
1985	12,236,695	182
1984	9,351,952	204
1983	8,614,552	225
1982	*	*
1981	*	*
1980	*	*
1979	*	*
1978	*	*
1977	*	*

*No published, public data was found on the internet for these production periods.
