= Monticelli (surname) =

Monticelli is an Italian surname. Notable people with the surname include:

- Adolphe Joseph Thomas Monticelli (1824–1886), French painter
- Angelo Monticelli (1778–1837), Italian painter
- Angelo Maria Monticelli (c. 1710–1758), Italian opera singer
- Daniele Monticelli (born 1970), Italian semiotician, translation scholar and translator
- Francesco Saverio Monticelli (1863–1927), Italian zoologist
- Mario Monticelli (1902–1995), Italian chess player
- Teodoro Monticelli (1759–1845), Italian geologist
