= Tatum High School =

Public high school in Tatum, Texas, U.S.

Location
- Tatum, Texas, U.S. 32.3213°N 94.5170°W

Information
- Type: Public
- School district: Tatum Independent School District
- Principal: Matthew Quick
- Grades: 9–12
- Enrollment: 449 (2023–2024)
- Colors: Green and white
- Mascot: Eagles
- Website: www.tatumisd.org/o/ths

Tatum High School is a public high school located in Tatum, Texas, United States. It is part of the Tatum Independent School District and serves students in grades 9 through 12. The school is known for its distinctive green and white colors and its mascot, the Eagles.

== History ==
Tatum High School has long served as a cornerstone of education in Tatum, Texas. Over the years, the school has evolved to meet the growing needs of the community while maintaining traditions that foster school spirit and academic excellence.

== Campus ==
The campus of Tatum High School features modern academic and athletic facilities designed to support a wide range of educational and extracurricular programs. The campus also serves as a venue for community events

== Academics ==
Tatum High School offers a comprehensive curriculum that includes Advanced Placement courses, dual-credit programs, and career and technical education. The school strives to prepare students for both higher education and the workforce. Academic performance metrics published by educational rating websites indicate that Tatum High School maintains competitive standards in the region.

== Athletics ==
Tatum High School fields a range of competitive athletic teams known as the Eagles. The school participates in sports such as football, basketball, baseball, track, and more.

In the 2024–25 season, the Eagles won the UIL 3A/D1 Boys Basketball state championship.

== Extracurricular activities ==
Tatum High School offers a variety of clubs, organizations, and extracurricular activities designed to enhance student life and foster personal growth. These programs include both academic clubs and arts, music, and leadership opportunities.

== Notable alumni ==
- C.J. Fite, college football defensive tackle for the Arizona State Sun Devils
