= Martin Creek Lake State Park =

State park in Texas, United States

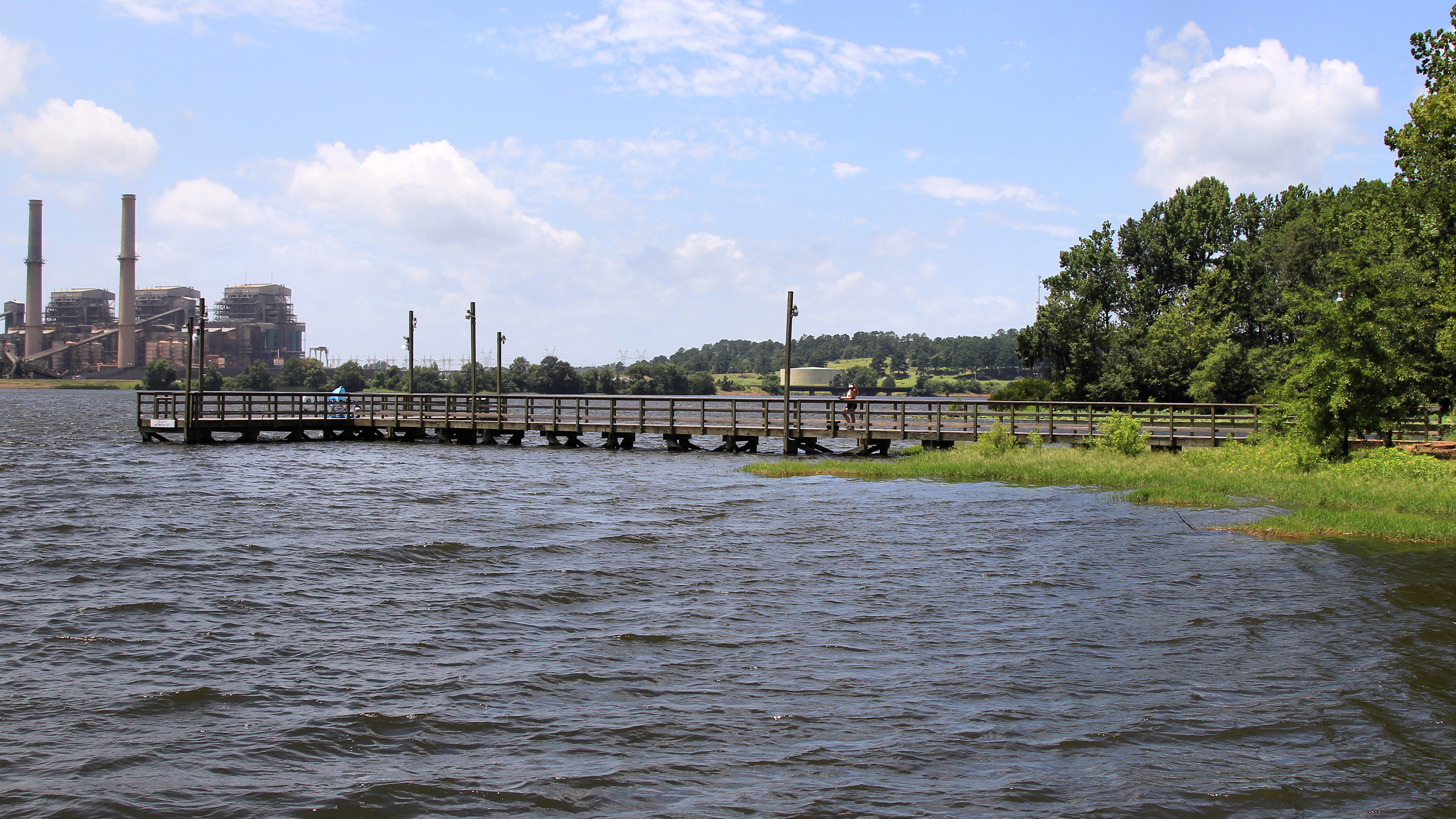
- A fishing pier in Martin Creek Lake State Park

- Location within Texas Location within the United States
- Location: Rusk County, Texas, United States
- Nearest city: Tatum
- Coordinates: 32°16′41″N 94°33′58″W
- Area: 286 acres (116 ha)
- Established: 1976
- Visitors: 76,598 (in 2025)
- Governing body: Texas Parks and Wildlife Department
- Website: Official site

Martin Creek Lake State Park is a 286 acres (116 ha) state park in East Texas in the United States. The park is located southwest of Tatum on Martin Creek Lake in Rusk County and is managed by the Texas Parks and Wildlife Department. The Texas Utilities Generating Company deeded the park to the state in 1976, and it opened the same year.

== Features ==
=== Recreation ===
The park offers year-round fishing, camping, paddling, lake swimming, hiking and cycling, water-skiing, picnicking, geocaching and nature photography.

== Nature ==
=== Plants ===
Many types of hardwood trees like black oak, water oak and winged elm are found in the park mixed in with softwoods like loblolly pine, shortleaf pine, eastern red cedar and Hercules' club trees. Some documented plants include American beautyberry, yaupon holly, honey locust, Mexican plum and common persimmon.

=== Animals ===
Wildlife found in this forested area include white-tailed deer, Virginia opossum, eastern cottontail, American beaver, common raccoon, Mexican long-nosed armadillo and eastern gray squirrel. Some of the most commonly seen birds are mallard duck, great blue heron, green heron, great egret, northern cardinal, blue jay, red-headed woodpecker, double-crested cormorant, neotropic cormorant and northern mockingbird.

Fish in Martin Creek Lake include largemouth bass, bluegill, crappie, channel catfish, yellow bullhead, tilapia and sunfish. Reptiles found in the lake are yellow-bellied water snake, broad-banded water snake and diamondback water snake.

== See also ==
- List of Texas state parks
