= Monticello Steam Electric Station =

- Country: United States
- Location: Titus County, southwest of Mount Pleasant, Texas
- Coordinates: 33°5′28″N 95°2′17″W
- Status: Decommissioned
- Commission date: Unit 1: December, 1974; Unit 2: December, 1975; Unit 3: August, 1978
- Decommission date: Units 1–3: January, 2018
- Owner: Luminant

Thermal power station
- Primary fuel: Coal
- Turbine technology: Steam turbine
- Cooling source: artificial Lake Monticello on Big Cypress Bayou

Power generation
- Nameplate capacity: 1,880 MW

The Monticello Steam Electric Station was a 1.88-gigawatt coal-fired power plant located southwest of Mount Pleasant, in Titus County, Texas, US from 1974 to 2018.

== History ==
Monticello had three units. Unit 1 began operations in 1974, Unit 2 became operational in 1975, and Unit 3, became operational in 1978. Originally, the plant produced electricity by burning lignite from nearby mines in Texas. Later the plant received rail shipments of coal solely from Peabody Energy's Rawhide Mine in the Powder River Basin of Wyoming. The plant was cooled by Lake Monticello, which also offers fishing and recreational facilities. The plant was owned by Luminant, a division of Energy Future Holdings. It was operated by Vistra Energy.

Selective non-catalytic reduction (SNCR) systems were retrofitted by Fluor to Monticello's units in 2008. This retrofit complimented the LO-NOx burners already installed at Monticello to reduce nitrogen oxide (NO_{x}) emissions. In November 2011, Luminant announced that, rather than retrofitting, they would permanently idle Units 1 and 2 to comply with the United States Environmental Protection Agency's (EPA) Cross-State Air Pollution Rule. With two units of the plant being idled, Luminant halted lignite extraction at nearby Sulphur Springs and Mount Pleasant Mines. It later restarted the units in March 2014 due increased demand for power generation from the 2014 North American cold wave. Luminant made the decision in 2014 that Monticello would rely on coal solely from the Powder River Basin beginning in 2016.

== Closure ==
Vistra announced in October 2017 that all three units would cease power generation in January 2018 due to advancements in renewable energy and a glut of natural gas depressing wholesale power prices. The Electric Reliability Council of Texas (ERCOT) permitted the closure of Monticello at a hearing in November 2017. The closure was scheduled for January 4, 2018.

== See also ==
- List of power stations in Texas
