= Crystal Powell =

American comedian, actress and singer

Crystal Powell is an American comedian, actress and singer best known for her roles in Kevin Hart Presents: Hart of the City on Comedy Central and America's Got Talent on NBC.

== Early life ==
Powell was born in the small town of Tatum, Texas and later moved to Houston with her family. After the death of both her parents at a young age, she moved to Los Angeles residing back and forth between LA and Houston over the years. Rather than let grief swallow her, she followed the advice of an agent to try improv to tap into her true personality at auditions, and from there she turned to comedy as a career to heal not only her own pain but that of others.

== Career ==
Powell has performed across the country at L.A’s Laugh Factory, the San Diego Civic Center, Chuckles Comedy House, and the Los Angeles, Ontario, Palm Beach, Arlington and Houston Improv Comedy Clubs, was chosen as a feature comic for the Laugh Out Loud comedy festival in 2018, and has appeared alongside fellow comics such as Kevin Hart, Mike Epps, Rodney Perry, Damon Williams, and Rudy Rush. She hosted a four-day event in honor of National Humor Month that made citywide headlines in Houston.

The Prairie View A&M University graduate is an active SAG/AFTRA member, appearing in the 2020 Lionsgate movie #2MinutesofFame with Katt Williams and KeKe Palmer; the 2018 film My B.F.F. starring Malik Yoba; Ball Don’t Lie featuring Nick Cannon, Ludacris and Rosanna Arquette; and making a guest appearance on the Emmy-nominated Jimmy Kimmel Live show. She has appeared on major network affiliates for FOX, ABC, NBC, CBS, The CW, TV One, and SiriusXM radio show Sway in the Morning.

In 2016, Powell was chosen from hundreds of hopefuls to represent top comics around the country for Hart’s new TV show, Hart of the City; she was the only female comic representing Texas. The show premiered on Comedy Central on October 2, 2016, and was part of a two show creation deal that Hart inked with the network. Powell was also the only comedian chosen to perform at Super Bowl Live during Super Bowl LI in 2017. She has also appeared as a guest correspondent on long-running Fox TV show Dish Nation.

As of summer 2020, she can be seen on Season 15 of NBC show America's Got Talent. She debuted on the nationally syndicated show performing a comedy routine that received positive feedback from all four judges, including Simon Cowell, Sophia Vergara, and fellow stand-up comedian Howie Mandel, as well as viewers. Due to the global COVID-19 pandemic, for the first time in history, the show is taping with no studio audience as a safety precaution.

In 2021, she was featured on Animal Planet's Puppy Bowl series of special programming, which aired on Super Bowl Sunday.

=== Awards and recognition ===
Powell won the 2015 i10 Media “Influential Entertainer’s Award,” the Houston Improv’s “Producer’s Award," was named one of “Houston’s All-Stars of Comedy," and In 2015, the then mayor of Houston, Annise Parker, issued an official proclamation naming September 18 as “Crystal Powell ‘Laughter Heals’ Day” in the City of Houston.
