= Lake Monticello (Texas) =

Lake in Texas, US

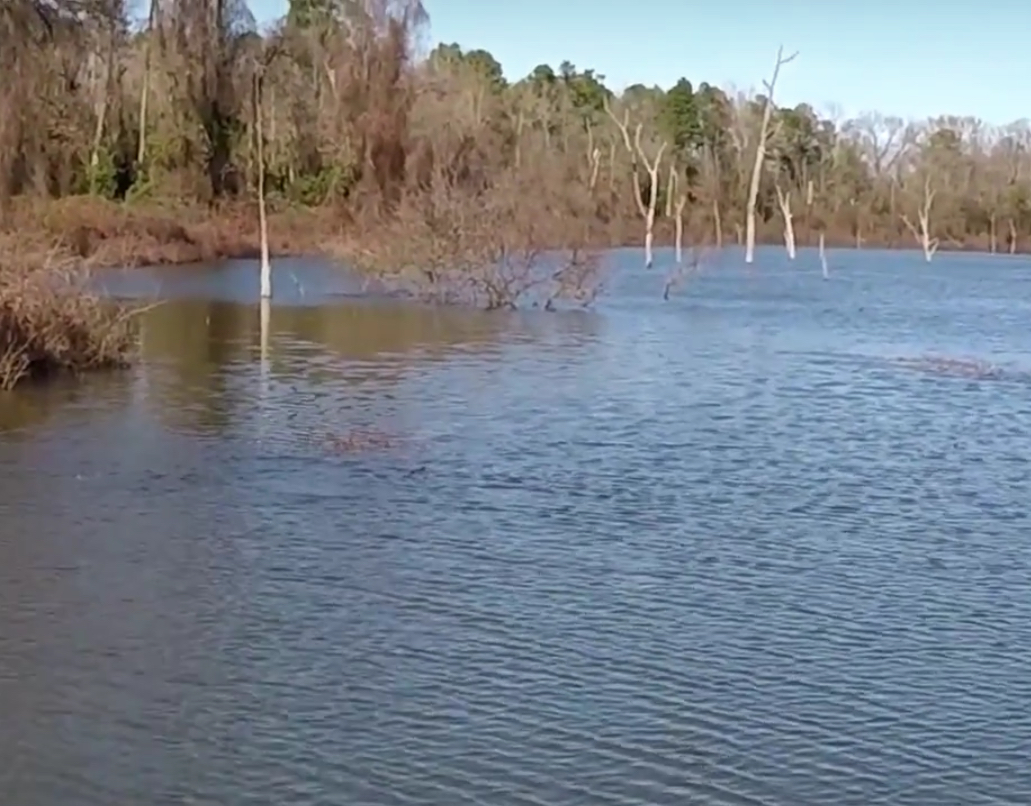
- Lake Monticello in 2018
- Interactive map of Lake Monticello
- Coordinates: 33.0921168°N 95.0537539°W
- Part of: Cypress River Basin
- Primary inflows: Blundell Creek, Smith Creek
- Surface area: 2,001 acres (8.10 square kilometres)
- Max. depth: 40 ft (12 metres)
- Surface elevation: 315 ft (96 metres)
- Frozen: Never

Lake Monticello is a 2,001 acres (8.10 square kilometres) lake in Titus County, Texas, United States. The maximum depth is 40 feet, and was impounded in 1972 by the Monticello Reservoir, which also disconnected it from Lake Bob Sandlin.

Lake Monticello is part of a 5,700 acres (23 square kilometres) property owned by the Hortenstine Ranch Company, and is one of the largest privately owned lakes in Texas. The lake was opened to the public in 1973, and was popular to recreation. The lake was used for cooling the Monticello power plant. After its closure in 2018, the water became cold. Access to the boat ramp was restricted in 2019, and it was later closed to the public. In early April 2024, it was put up for sale for $131 million.

Lake Monticello is the namesake of Monticello, Texas, which is located northward.
