= Lignite =

Soft, brown, combustible, sedimentary rock

Lignite (from Latin lignum 'wood'), often called brown coal, is a soft, brown, combustible sedimentary rock formed from naturally compressed peat. It has a carbon content around 25–35% and is considered the lowest rank of coal due to its relatively low heat content. When removed from the ground, it contains a very high amount of moisture, which partially explains its low carbon content. Lignite is mined all around the world and is used almost exclusively as a fuel for steam-electric power generation.

Lignite combustion produces less heat for the amount of carbon dioxide and sulfur released than other ranks of coal. As a result, lignite is the most harmful coal to human health. Depending on the source, various toxic heavy metals, including naturally occurring radioactive materials, may be present in lignite and left over in the coal fly ash produced from its combustion, further increasing health risks.

== Characteristics ==
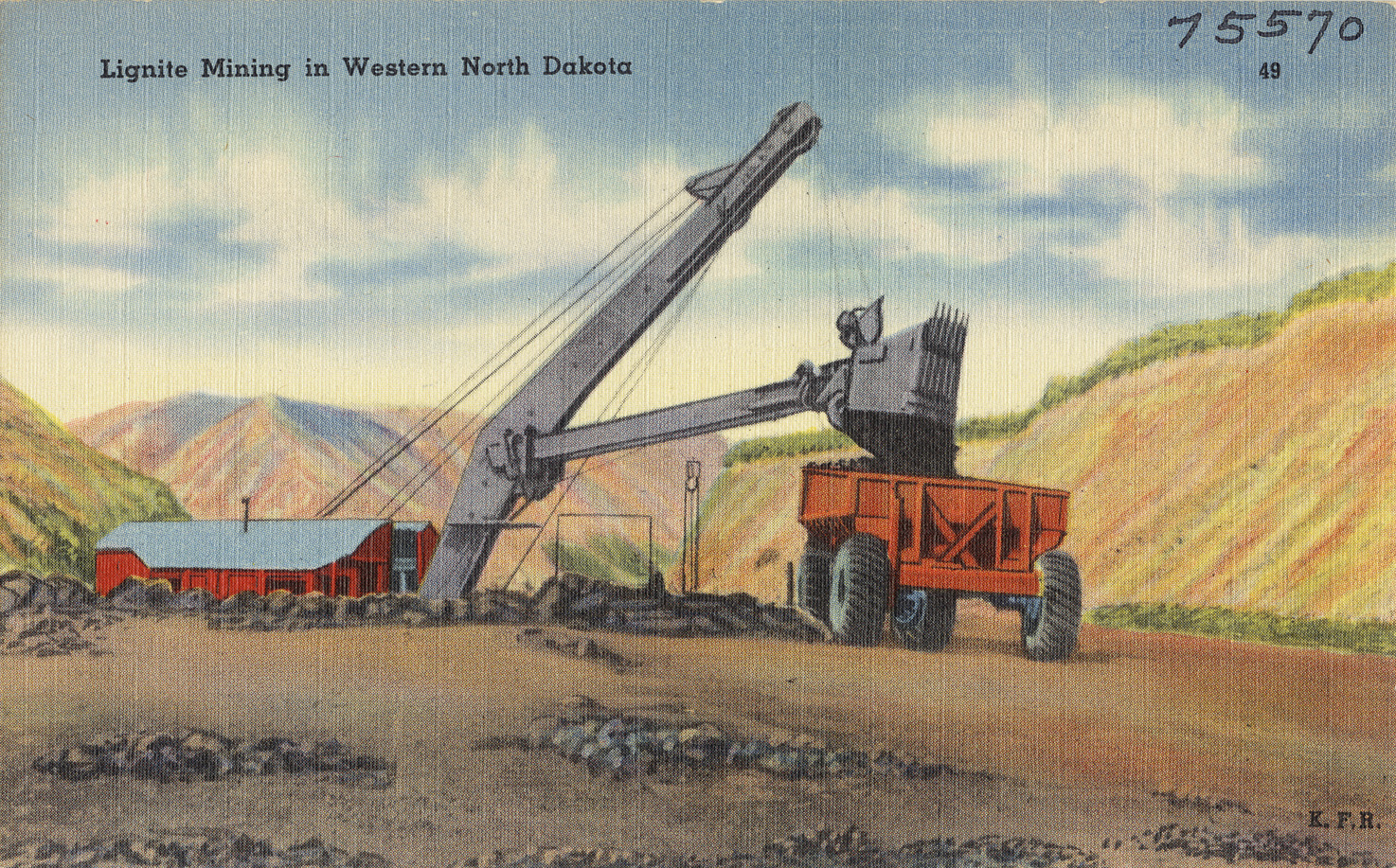
Lignite mining, western North Dakota, US (c. 1945)

Lignite is brownish-black in color and has a carbon content of 60–70 percent on a dry ash-free basis. However, its inherent moisture content is sometimes as high as 75 percent and its ash content ranges from 6–19 percent, compared with 6–12 percent for bituminous coal. As a result, its carbon content on the as-received basis (i.e., containing both inherent moisture and mineral matter) is typically just 25-35 percent.

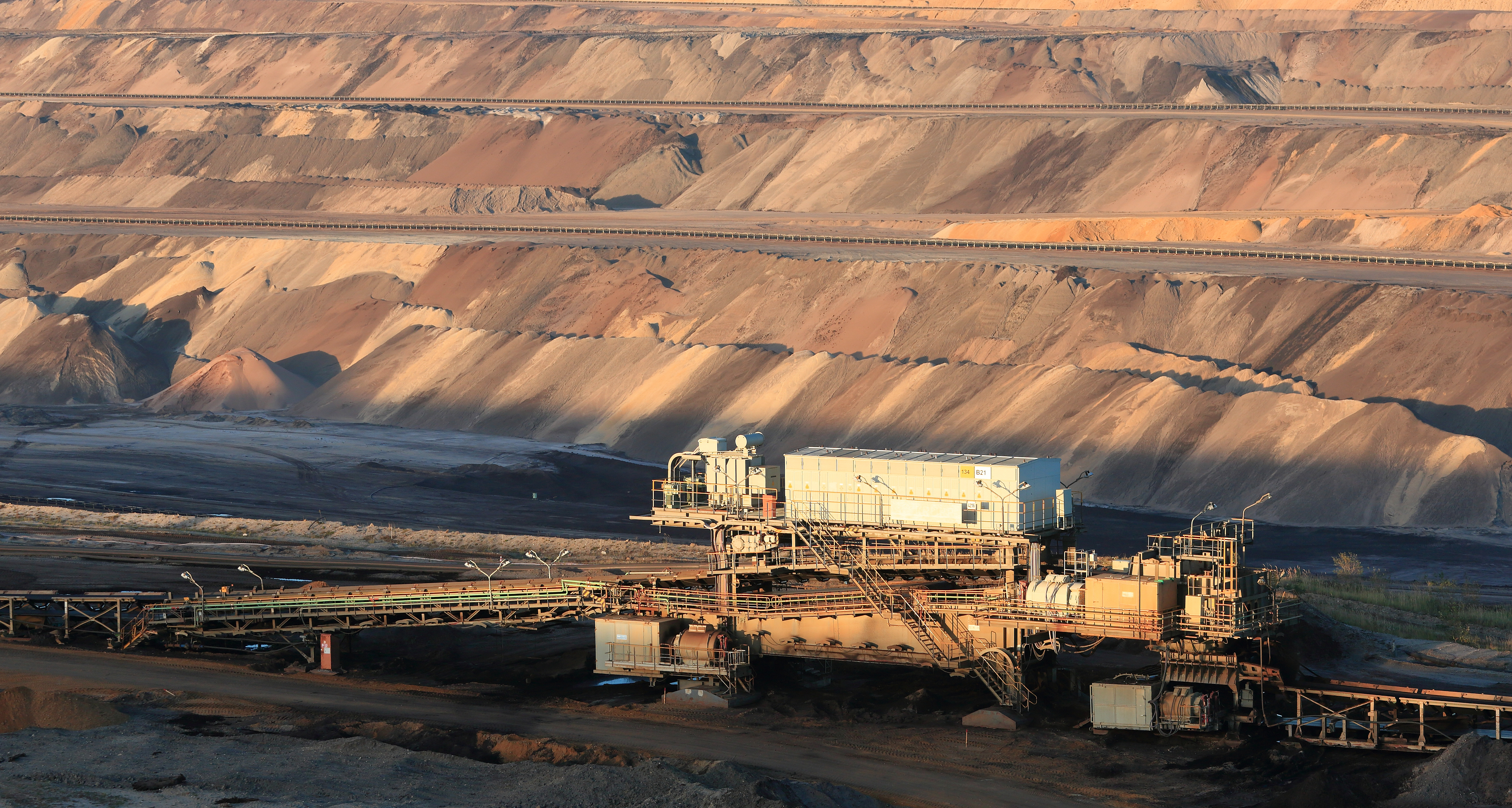
Strip mining lignite at Tagebau Garzweiler in Germany

The energy content of lignite ranges from 10 to 20 MJ/kg (9 to 17 million BTU/short ton) on a moist, mineral-matter-free basis. The energy content of lignite consumed in the United States averages 15 MJ/kg (13 million BTU/short ton), on the as-received basis. The energy content of lignite consumed in Victoria, Australia, averages 8.6 MJ/kg (7.4 million BTU/short ton) on a net wet basis.

Lignite has a high content of volatile matter which makes it easier to convert into gas and liquid petroleum products than higher-ranking coals. Its high moisture content and susceptibility to spontaneous combustion can cause problems in transportation and storage. Processes which remove water from brown coal reduce the risk of spontaneous combustion to the same level as black coal, increase the calorific value of brown coal to a black coal equivalent fuel, and significantly reduce the emissions profile of 'densified' brown coal to a level similar to or better than most black coals. However, removing the moisture increases the cost of the final lignite fuel.

Lignite rapidly degrades when exposed to air, in a process called slacking (or slackening).

== Uses ==
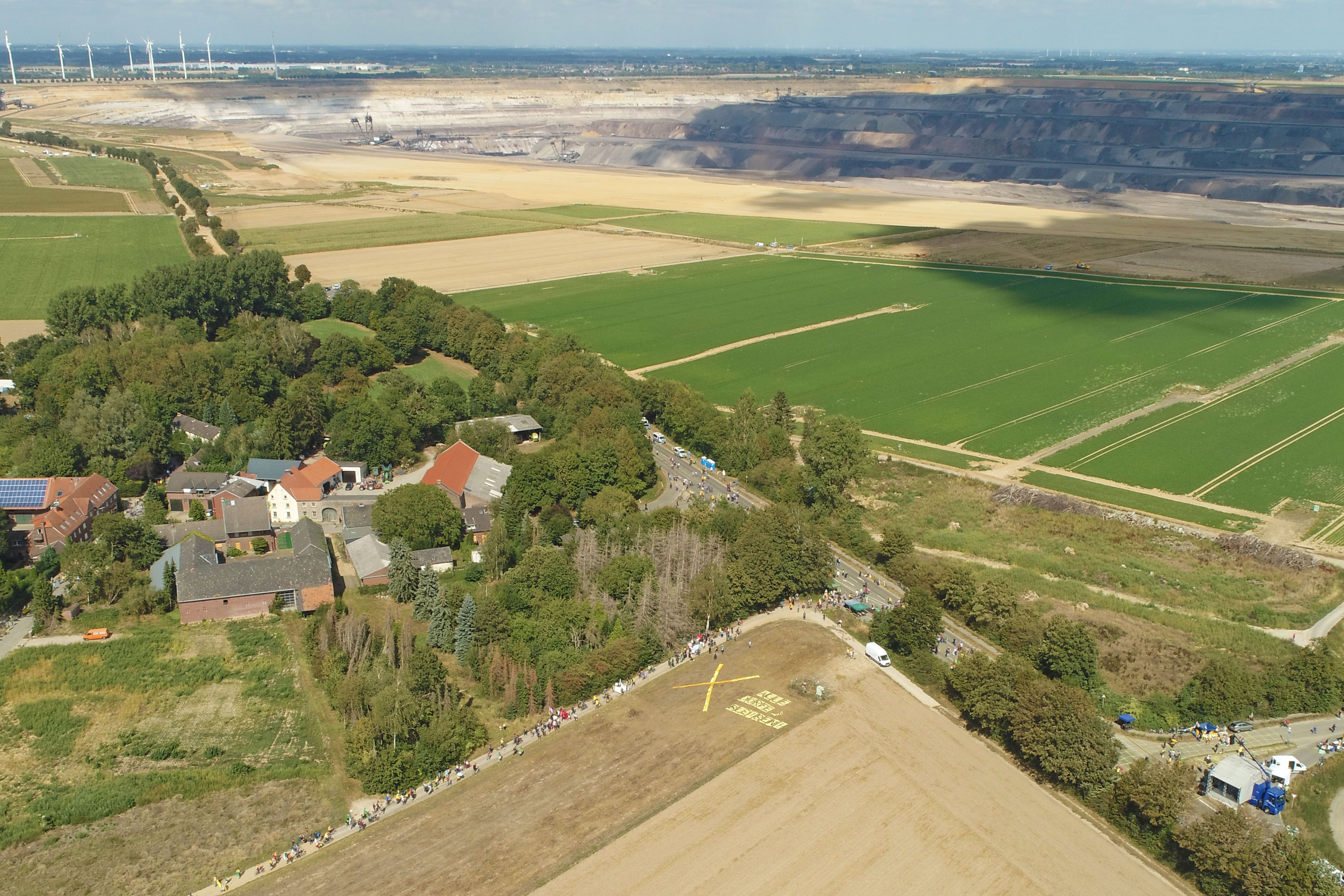
Lignite mine in the background of Lützerath, Germany

Most lignite is used to generate electricity. However, small amounts are used in agriculture, in industry, and as jet, in jewelry. Its historical use as fuel for home heating has continuously declined and is now of lower importance than its use to generate electricity.

=== As fuel ===
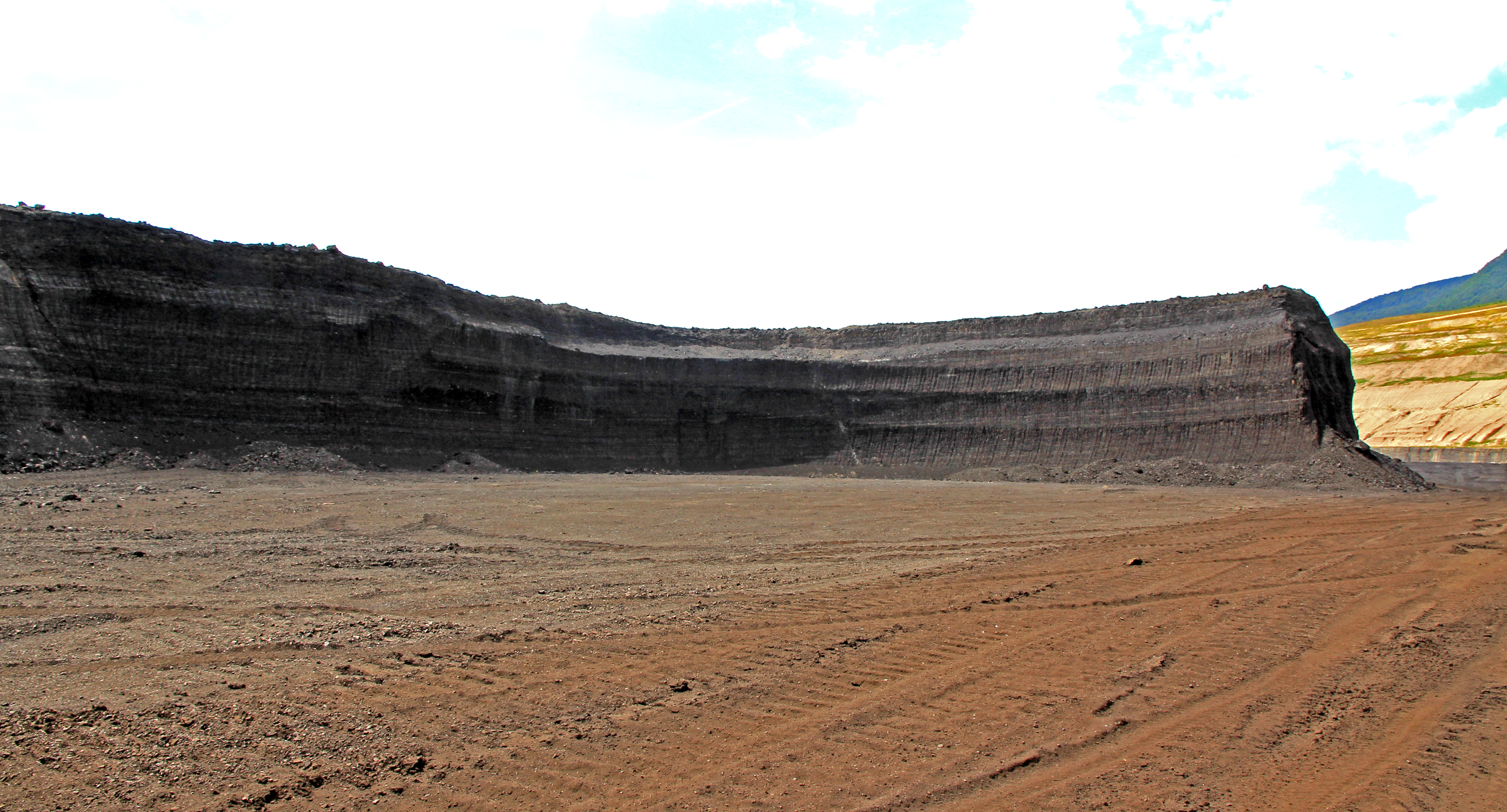
Layer of lignite for mining in Lom ČSA, Czech Republic

Lignite is often found in thick beds located near the surface, making it inexpensive to mine. However, because of its low energy density, tendency to crumble, and typically high moisture content, brown coal is inefficient to transport and is not traded extensively on the world market compared with higher coal grades. It is often burned in power stations near the mines, such as in Poland's Bełchatów plant and Turów plant, Australia's Latrobe Valley and Luminant's Monticello plant and Martin Lake plant in Texas. Primarily because of latent high moisture content and low energy density of brown coal, carbon dioxide emissions from traditional brown-coal-fired plants are generally much higher per megawatt-hour generated than for comparable black-coal plants, with the world's highest-emitting plant being Australia's Hazelwood Power Station until its closure in March 2017. The operation of traditional brown-coal plants, particularly in combination with strip mining, is politically contentious due to environmental concerns.

The German Democratic Republic relied extensively on lignite to become energy self-sufficient, and eventually obtained 70% of its energy requirements from lignite. Lignite was also an important chemical industry feedstock via Bergius process or Fischer-Tropsch synthesis in lieu of petroleum, which had to be imported for hard currency following a change in policy by the Soviet Union in the 1970s, which had previously delivered petroleum at below market rates. East German scientists even converted lignite into coke suitable for metallurgical uses (high temperature lignite coke) and much of the railway network was dependent on lignite either through steam trains or electrified lines mostly fed with lignite derived power. East Germany was the largest producer of lignite for much of its existence as an independent state.

In 2014, about 12 percent of Germany's energy and, specifically, 27 percent of its electricity came from lignite power plants, while in 2014 in Greece, lignite provided about 50 percent of its power needs. Germany has announced plans to phase out lignite by 2038 at the latest. Greece confirmed that the last coal plant was shut down in 2025 after receiving pressure from the European Union and plans to heavily invest in renewable energy.

=== Home heating ===
Lignite was and is used as a replacement for or in combination with firewood for home heating. It is usually pressed into briquettes for that use. Due to the smell it gives off when burned, lignite was often seen as a fuel for poor people compared to higher value hard coals. In Germany, briquettes are still readily available to end consumers in home improvement stores and supermarkets.

=== In agriculture ===
An environmentally beneficial use of lignite is in agriculture. Lignite may have value as an environmentally benign soil amendment, improving cation exchange and phosphorus availability in soils while reducing availability of heavy metals, and may be superior to commercial K humates. Lignite fly ash produced by combustion of lignite in power plants may also be valuable as a soil amendment and fertilizer. However, rigorous studies of the long-term benefits of lignite products in agriculture are lacking.

Lignite may also be used for the cultivation and distribution of biological control microbes that suppress plant pests. The carbon increases the organic matter in the soil while the biological control microbes provide an alternative to chemical pesticides.

Leonardite is a soil conditioner rich in humic acids that are formed by natural oxidation when lignite comes in contact with air. The process can be replicated artificially on a large scale. The less matured xyloid (wood-shaped) lignite also contains high amounts of humic acid.

=== In drilling mud ===
Reaction with quaternary amine forms a product called amine-treated lignite (ATL), which is used in drilling mud to reduce fluid loss during drilling.

=== As an industrial adsorbent ===
Lignite may have potential uses as an industrial adsorbent. Experiments show that its adsorption of methylene blue falls within the range of activated carbons currently used by industry.

=== In jewellery ===
Jet is a form of lignite that has been used as a gemstone. The earliest jet artifacts date to 10,000 BCE and jet was used extensively in necklaces and other ornamentation in Britain from the Neolithic until the end of Roman Britain. Jet experienced a brief revival in Victorian Britain.

== Geology ==
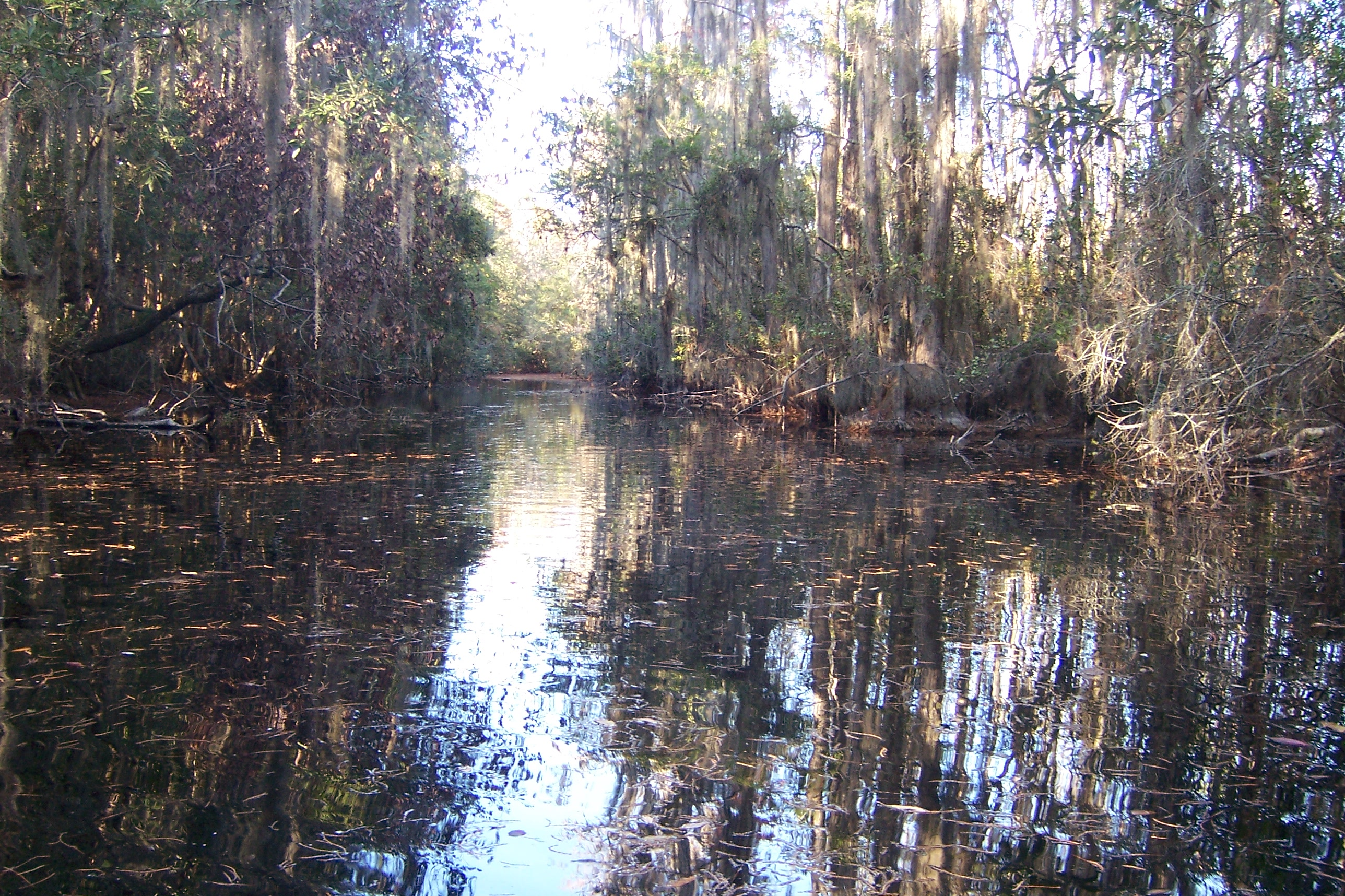
Okefenokee Swamp, a modern peat-forming swamp

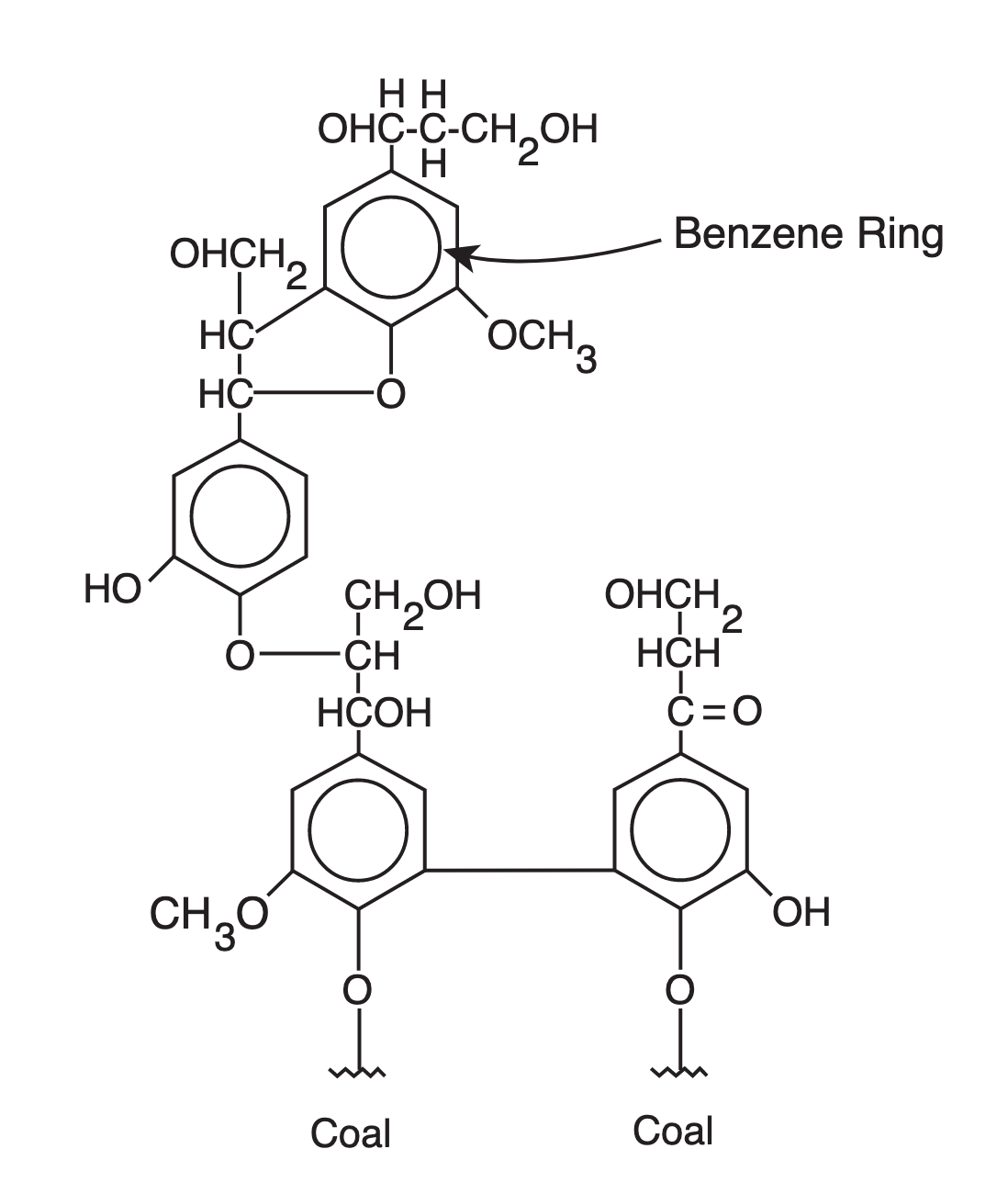
Partial molecular structure of a lignin-derived organic molecule in lignite

Lignite begins as partially decayed plant material, or peat. Peat tends to accumulate in areas with high moisture, slow land subsidence and freedom from disturbance by rivers or oceans – under these conditions, the area remains saturated with water, which covers dead vegetation and protects it from atmospheric oxygen. Peat swamps are found in a variety of climates and geographical settings. Anaerobic bacteria may contribute to the degradation of peat, but this process takes a long time, particularly in acidic water. Burial by other sediments further slows biological degradation, and subsequent transformations are a result of increased temperatures and pressures underground.

Lignite forms from peat that has not been subjected to deep burial and heating. It forms at temperatures below 100 °C (212 °F), primarily by biochemical degradation. This includes the process of humification, in which microorganisms extract hydrocarbons from peat and form humic acids, which decrease the rate of bacterial decay. In lignite, humification is partial, coming to completion only when the coal reaches sub-bituminous rank. The most characteristic chemical change in the organic material during formation of lignite is the sharp reduction in the number of C=O and C-O-R functional groups.

Lignite deposits are typically younger than higher-ranked coals, with the majority of them having formed during the Tertiary period.

== Extraction ==
Lignite is often found in thick beds located near the surface. These are inexpensive to extract using various forms of surface mining, though this can result in serious environmental damage. Regulations in the United States and other countries require that land that is surface mined must be restored to its original productivity once mining is complete.

Strip mining of lignite in the United States begins with drilling to establish the extent of the subsurface beds. Topsoil and subsoil must be properly removed and either used to reclaim previously mined-out areas or stored for future reclamation. Excavator and truck overburden removal prepares the area for dragline overburden removal to expose the lignite beds. These are broken up using specially equipped tractors (coal ripping) and then loaded into bottom dump trucks using front loaders.

Once the lignite is removed, restoration involves grading the mine spoil to as close an approximation as practical of the original ground surface (Approximate Original Contour or AOC). Subsoil and topsoil are restored and the land reseeded with various grasses. In North Dakota, a performance bond is held against the mining company for at least ten years after the end of mining operations to guarantee that the land has been restored to full productivity. A bond (not necessary in this form) for mine reclamation is required in the US by the Surface Mining Control and Reclamation Act of 1977.

== Resources and reserves ==
=== List of countries by lignite resources ===
Top Ten Countries by lignite resources (2022)
Countries	Lignite resources (millions of tons)
United States	1,368,124
Russia	541,353
Australia	407,430
China	323,849
Poland	222,392
Vietnam	199,876
Pakistan	176,739
Mongolia	119,426
Canada	118,270
India	38,830
Germany	36,500

=== Australia ===
The Latrobe Valley in Victoria, Australia, contains estimated reserves of some 65 billion tonnes of brown coal. The deposit is equivalent to 25 percent of known world reserves. The coal seams are up to 98 metres (322 feet) thick, with multiple coal seams often giving virtually continuous brown coal thickness of up to 230 m (755 ft). Seams are covered by very little overburden (10 to 20 m [33 to 66 ft]).

A partnership led by Kawasaki Heavy Industries and backed by the governments of Japan and Australia has begun extracting hydrogen from brown coal. The liquefied hydrogen will be shipped via the transporter Suiso Frontier to Japan.

=== North America ===
The largest lignite deposits in North America are the Gulf Coast lignites and the Fort Union lignite field. The Gulf Coast lignites are located in a band running from Texas to Alabama roughly parallel to the Gulf Coast. The Fort Union lignite field stretches from North Dakota to Saskatchewan. Both are important commercial sources of lignite.

== Types ==
Lignite can be separated into two types: xyloid lignite or fossil wood, and compact lignite or perfect lignite.

Although xyloid lignite may sometimes have the tenacity and the appearance of ordinary wood, the combustible woody tissue has experienced a great modification. It is reducible to a fine powder by trituration, and if submitted to a weak solution of potash, it yields a considerable quantity of humic acid. Leonardite is an oxidized form of lignite, which also contains high levels of humic acid.

Jet is a hardened, gem-like form of lignite used in various types of jewelry.

== Production ==
Germany is the largest producer of lignite, followed by China, Russia, and the United States. Lignite accounted for 8% of all US coal production in 2019.

Lignite mined in millions of tonnes
Country or territory	1970	1980	1990	2000	2010	2011	2012	2013	2014	2015
East Germany	261	258.1	280	(Note: East Germany became a part of Germany as a result of German reunification in 1990.)						
Germany	108 (Note: Data prior to 2000 are for West Germany only.)	129.9	107.6	167.7	169	176.5	185.4	183	178.2	178.1
China	–	24.3	45.5	47.7	125.3	136.3	145	147	145	140
Russia	145 (Note: Data prior to 2000 represent the Soviet Union.)	141	137.3	87.8	76.1	76.4	77.9	73	70	73.2
Kazakhstan	(Note: Country was a part of the Soviet Union during this time.)			2.6	7.3	8.4	5.5	6.5	6.6	–
Uzbekistan	(Note: Country was a part of the Soviet Union during this time.)			2.5	3.4	3.8	3.8	–	–	–
United States	5	42.8	79.9	77.6	71.0	73.6	71.6	70.1	72.1	64.7
Poland	–	36.9	67.6	59.5	56.5	62.8	64.3	66	63.9	63.1
Turkey	–	14.5	44.4	60.9	70.0	72.5	68.1	57.5	62.6	50.4
Australia	–	32.9	46	67.3	68.8	66.7	69.1	59.9	58.0	63.0
Greece	–	23.2	51.9	63.9	56.5	58.7	61.8	54	48	46
India	–	5	14.1	24.2	37.7	42.3	43.5	45	47.2	43.9
Indonesia	–	–	–	–	40.0	51.3	60.0	65.0	60.0	60.0
Czechoslovakia	82	87	71	(Note: Czechoslovakia dissolved in 1993.)						
Czech Republic	(Note: Country was a part of Czechoslovakia during this time.)			50.1	43.8	46.6	43.5	40	38.3	38.3
Slovakia	(Note: Country was a part of Czechoslovakia during this time.)			3.7	2.4	2.4	2.3	–	–	–
Yugoslavia	–	33.7	64.1	35.5 (Note: 2000 data is for Federal Republic of Yugoslavia.)	(Note: Yugoslavia broke up in a process that concluded in 1992.)					
Serbia	(Note: Country was a part of Yugoslavia during this time.)			(Note: Country was a part of Federal Republic of Yugoslavia during this time.)	37.8	40.6	38	40.1	29.7	37.3
Kosovo	(Note: Country was a part of Yugoslavia during this time.)				8.7 (Note: Albanians unilaterally declared independence from Serbia, but the country it is not member of UN and its status is heavily disputed.)	9	8.7	8.2	7.2	8.2
North Macedonia	(Note: Country was a part of Yugoslavia during this time.)			7.5	6.7	8.2	7.5	–	–	–
Bosnia and Herzegovina	(Note: Country was a part of Yugoslavia during this time.)			3.4	11	7.1	7	6.2	6.2	6.5
Slovenia	(Note: Country was a part of Yugoslavia during this time.)			3.7	4	4.1	4	–	–	–
Montenegro	(Note: Country was a part of Yugoslavia during this time.)				1.9	2	2	–	–	–
Romania	–	26.5	33.7	29	31.1	35.5	34.1	24.7	23.6	25.2
Bulgaria	–	30	31.5	26.3	29.4	37.1	32.5	26.5	31.3	35.9
Albania	–	1.4	2.1	30	14	9	20	–	–	–
Thailand	–	1.5	12.4	17.8	18.3	21.3	18.3	18.1	18	15.2
Mongolia	–	4.4	6.6	5.1	8.5	8.3	9.9	–	–	–
Canada	–	6	9.4	11.2	10.3	9.7	9.5	9.0	8.5	10.5
Hungary	–	22.6	17.3	14	9.1	9.6	9.3	9.6	9.6	9.3
North Korea	–	10	10.6	7.2	6.7	6.8	6.8	7	7	7
Source: World Coal Association · US Energy Information Administration · BGR bund.de Energiestudie 2016 · 1970 data from World Coal (1987) – no data available

== Gallery ==
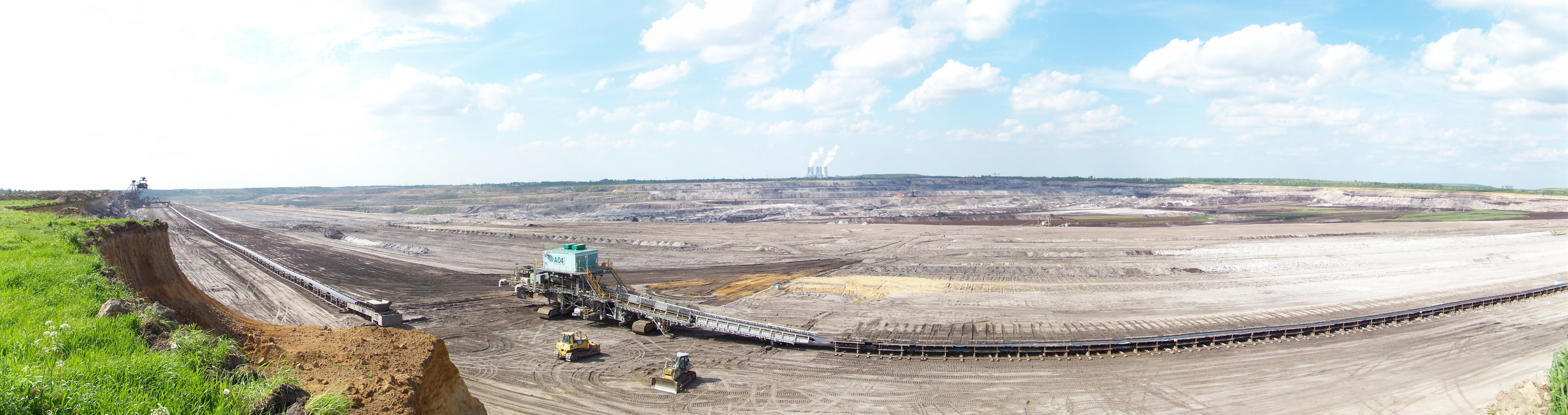
Open-pit United Schleenhain coal mine in Saxony, Germany

== See also ==
- Rheinisches Braunkohlerevier
- NLC India Limited
- Coal analysis – Measurement of properties of coal
- Dakota Gasification Company
- Energy value of coal
- International Humic Substances Society
- Karrick process – Low temperature carbonization and pyrolysis process
- Kemper Project – Power station in Mississippi, US
- Orders of magnitude (specific energy) – Physical quantity representing energy content per unit mass
- Subcoal – Coal substitute made from recycled waste
- Torrefaction – Thermochemical process
