= Luminant =

Electric utility company

- Company type: Subsidiary
- Industry: Electric utility
- Founded: Dallas, Texas, US
- Headquarters: Dallas, Texas, US
- Products: Electricity generation Electricity distribution Mining; Construction
- Parent: Vistra Corp
- Website: www.luminant.com

Luminant is a Texas-based electric utility. It is a wholly owned subsidiary of Energy Future Holdings Corporation. Luminant's operations include electricity generation and wholesaling, mining, construction, and development. The company has capacity for the generation of 18,300 megawatts (MW) of electricity in 20 power plants spread across Texas, of which 2,300 MW come from nuclear power generated at the company's Comanche Peak Nuclear Power Plant, 5,800 MW from coal-fired power plants, and the remainder from natural gas-fired plants. Luminant is also a major purchaser of wind power.

Luminant also owns and operated three of the five largest coal mines (by production) in Texas: the Beckville Strip, the Three Oaks Mine, and the Oak Hill Strip. The Beckville Mine was mined out in fall 2015 and the three drag lines were moved to other mines. It is now closed. The Oak Hill Mine closed in December 2016 laying off 77 miners. The company extracted over fourteen million short tons of coal from those three mines in 2007. The company also operates a private rail line known as the Martin Lake Rail Line that carries coal from mines around Texas and the Powder River Basin via BNSF the Martin Lake Power Plant.

== History ==
The new 1600 MW Oak Grove which burns lignite coal from the Kosse Mine went online.

In February 2013, a Waco-based federal judge denied a motion filed by Luminant seeking dismissal of an air pollution lawsuit brought by the Sierra Club. The lawsuit involves excess levels of particulate matter at two Texas power plants owned by Luminant. The suit is based on information filed by Luminant with state environmental regulators which revealed thousands of violations of clean air standards.

In August 2013, Luminant was sued by the Environment Protection Agency over air-pollution standards at two Texas plants. This enforcement action followed two earlier EPA notices of violations at Luminant's Big Brown and Martin Lake plants. The suit alleges that Luminant made unauthorized changes to the two coal-fired plants.

Also in August the Dallas County Medical Society announced that it would petition the Texas Commission on Environmental Quality to crack down on Luminant and its three Texas power plants: Big Brown, Martin Creek Lake and Monticello. The doctor's group wants Luminant to lower emissions from the three plants. They say that doing so will lower cases of asthma, chronic lung disease, heart attacks and premature death contributed to by coal emissions.

On April 29, 2014, Energy Future Holdings, Luminant's parent company, filed for bankruptcy protection under Title 11 of the United States Bankruptcy Code.

Luminant current has a new parent company called Vistra Corp which is a successor to Energy Future Holdings.
