= Coal power in the United States =

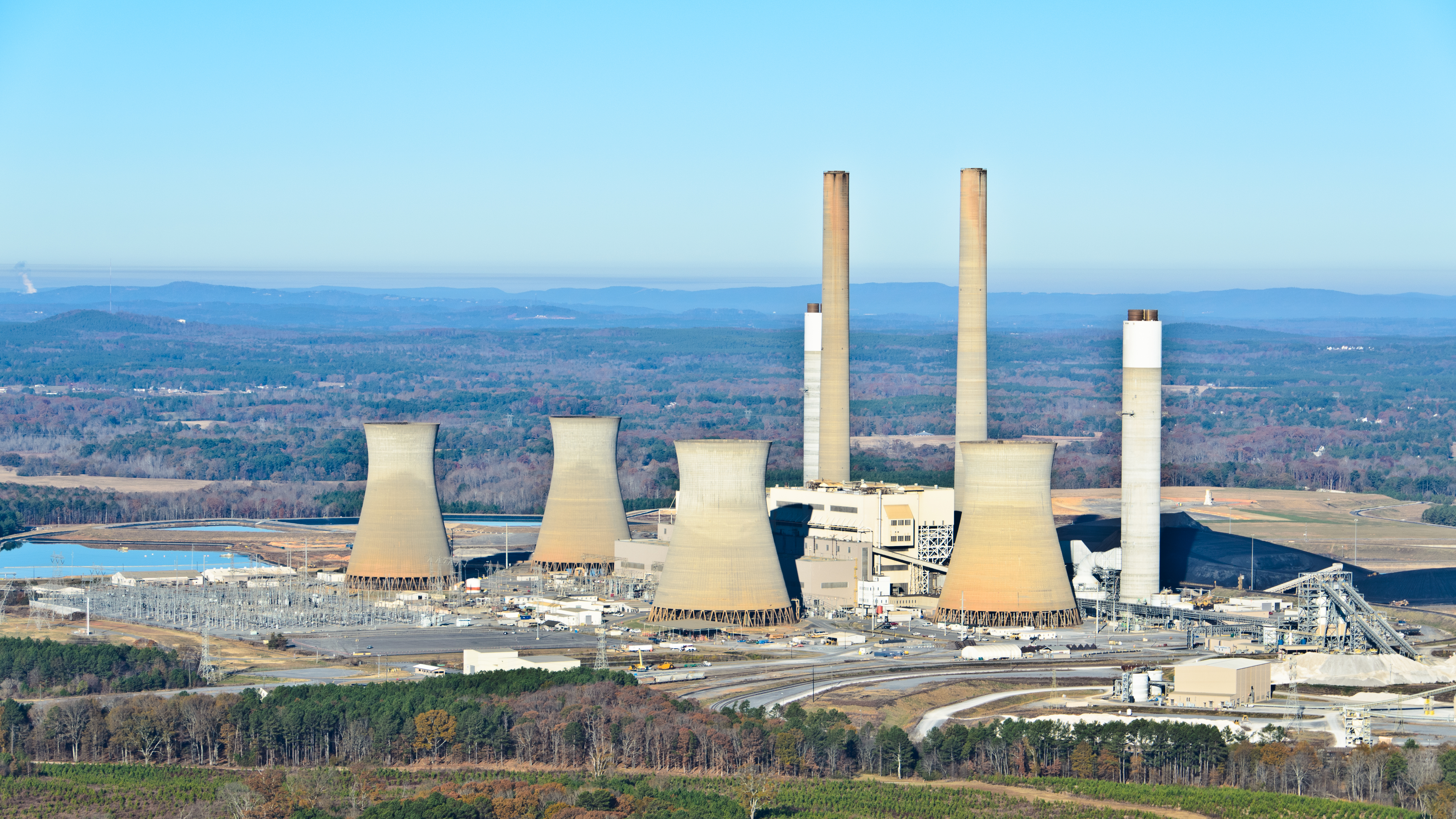
Plant Bowen, the third largest coal-fired power station in the United States

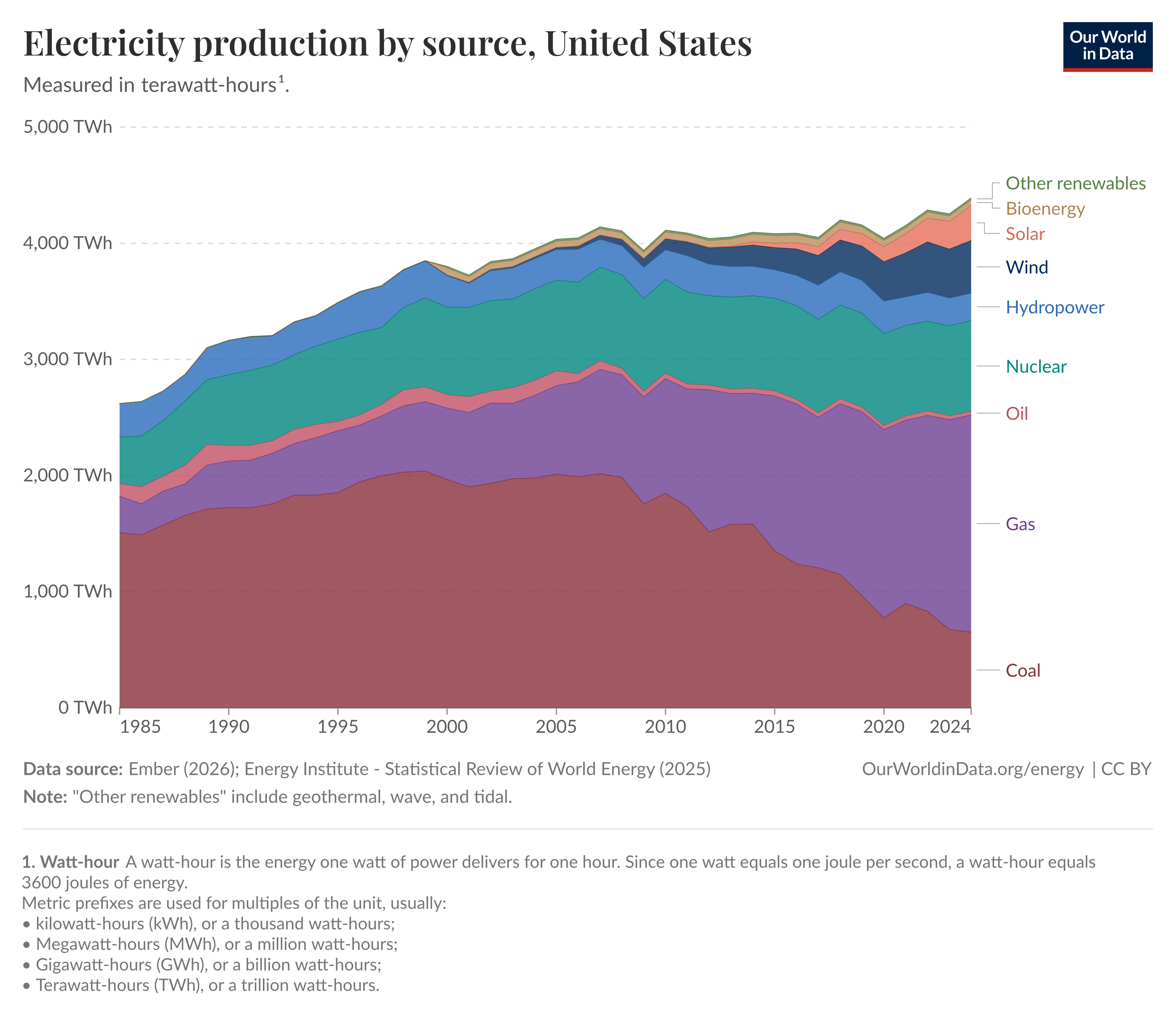
Electricity generation by source

Coal power generation in 2011 by state

There were almost 200 coal power plants across the United States in 2026. Utilities buy more than 90% of the coal consumed in the United States. Coal plants have been closing since the 2010s due to cheaper and cleaner natural gas and renewables. Coal generated about 16% of the electricity at utility-scale facilities in the United States in 2023, down from 39% in 2014 and 51% in 2001. Due to measures such as scrubbers, air pollution from the plants has lessened, but deaths are still estimated at thousands each year with 1600 deaths in 2020 from PM_{25} alone. Environmentalists say that political action is needed to close them faster, to also reduce greenhouse gas emissions by the United States and better limit climate change.

Coal has been used to generate electricity in the United States since an Edison plant was built in New York City in 1882. The first AC power station was opened by General Electric in Ehrenfeld, Pennsylvania in 1902, servicing the Webster Coal and Coke Company. By the mid-20th century, coal had become the leading fuel for generating electricity in the US. The long, steady rise of coal-fired generation of electricity shifted to a decline after 2007. The decline has been linked to the increased availability of natural gas, decreased consumption, renewable power, and more stringent environmental regulations. The Environmental Protection Agency has advanced restrictions on coal plants to counteract mercury pollution, smog, and global warming.

== Trends, comparisons, and forecasts ==
The average share of electricity generated from coal in the US has dropped from 52.8% in 1997 to 19.7% in 2022. In 2017, there were 359 coal-powered units at the electrical utilities across the US, with a total nominal capacity of 256 GW (compared to 1024 units at a nominal 278 GW in 2000). The actual average generated power from coal in 2006 was 227.1 GW (1991 TWh per year), the highest in the world and still slightly ahead of China (1950 TWh per year) at that time. In 2000, the US average production of electricity from coal was 224.3 GW (1966 TWh for the year). In 2006, US electrical generation consumed 1,027 million short tons (932 million metric tons) or 92.3% of the coal mined in the US. In 2021, coal supplied 9.5 quadrillion British thermal units (2,800 TWh) of primary energy to electric power plants, which made up 90% of coal's contribution to U.S. energy supply.

Total wind+solar electricity generation exceeds coal-based energy in the U.S. since 2024.

Due to emergence of shale gas, coal consumption declined from 2009. In the first quarter of 2012, the use of coal for electricity generation declined substantially more, 21% from 2011 levels. According to the U.S. Energy Information Administration, 27 gigawatts of capacity from coal-fired generators is to be retired from 175 coal-fired power plants between 2012 and 2016. Natural gas showed a corresponding increase, increasing by a third over 2011. Coal's share of electricity generation dropped to just over 36%. Coal use continues to decline rapidly through November 2015 with its share around 33.6%.

The coal plants are mostly base-load plants with typical utilisation rates of 50% to 60% (relating to full load hours).

Utility companies have shut down and retired aging coal-fired power plants following the Environmental Protection Agency's (EPA) implementation of the Cross-State Air Pollution Rule (CSAP). The extent of shutdowns and reduction in utilization depend on factors such as future price of natural gas and cost of installation of pollution control equipment; however, as of 2013, the future of coal-fired power plants in the United States did not appear promising. In 2014 estimates gauged that an additional 40 gigawatts (GW) of coal-fired capacity would retire until 2020, in addition to the nearly 20GW that already had retired as of 2014. This is driven most strongly by inexpensive natural gas competing with coal, and EPA's Mercury and Air Toxics Standards (MATS), which require significant reductions in emissions of mercury, acid gases, and toxic metals, scheduled to take effect in April 2015. Over 13 GW of coal power plants built between 1950 and 1970 were retired in 2015, averaging 133 MW per plant. In Texas, the price drop of natural gas has reduced the capacity factor in 7 of the state's coal plants (max. output 8 GW), and they contribute about a quarter of the state's electricity.

The cost of transporting coal may be around $20/ton for trains, or $5–6/ton for barge and truck. A 2015 study by a consortium of environmental organizations concluded that US Government subsidies for coal production are around $8/ton for the Powder River Basin.

In 2018, 16 of the 50 Federal States of the US had either no coal power in their power production for the public power supply (California, Idaho, Massachusetts, Rhode Island and Vermont), less than 5% coal in power production (Connecticut, Maine, New Hampshire, New Jersey, New York, Delaware) or between 5 and 10% (Alaska, Nevada, Mississippi, Oregon and Washington State)

In 2023, the United States experienced a notable decrease in coal capacity, with 9.7 gigawatts (GW) of coal power being retired. This represents a reduction in the rate of coal plant retirements compared to previous years, suggesting a deceleration in the phasing out of coal infrastructure in the country.

== Death and disease ==
Deaths from coal power from 1999 to 2020 are estimated at 460,000, mostly in the first decade. Due to measures such as scrubbers, air pollution from coal plants killed far fewer people by the 2020s, but still estimated at thousands each year with 1600 deaths in 2020 from PM_{25} alone. As of 2026 a few plants emit mercury, lead or arsenic; due to regulations which have been described as allowing “brain poison”.

Ground-level ozone can aggravate asthma. Sulfur dioxide can cause respiratory disease. A 2025 study concluded that phasing out coal would make people in Texas and Pennsylvania healthier.

== Environmental impacts ==
Ash ponds can pollute groundwater. In the late 20th century sulfur dioxide from coal plants caused acid rain. Emissions from electricity generation account for the 2nd largest share of greenhouse gas emissions by the United States after transportation. Although coal power produces a small share of electricity in the mid-2020s it emits a lot of CO_{2}, 1,400 to 1,500 million metric ton of CO_{2} emissions each year.

== Public debate ==
=== Advocates ===
In 2007 an advertising campaign was launched to improve public opinion on coal power titled America's Power. This was done by the American Coalition for Clean Coal Electricity (then known as Americans for Balanced Energy Choices), a pro-coal organization started in 2000.

=== Opposition ===
In the face of increasing electricity demand through the 2000s, the US has seen a "Growing Trend Against Coal-Fired Power Plants". In 2005, the 790 MW Mohave Power Station closed rather than implement court ordered pollution controls. In 2006 through 2007 there was first a bullish market attitude towards coal with the expectation of a new wave of plants, but political barriers and pollution concerns escalated exponentially, which is likely to damage plans for new generation and put pressure on older plants. In 2007, 59 proposed coal plants were canceled, abandoned, or placed on hold by sponsors as a result of financing obstacles, regulatory decisions, judicial rulings, and new global warming legislation.

The Stop Coal campaign has called for a moratorium on the construction of any new coal plants and for the phase-out of all existing plants, citing concern for global warming. Others have called for a carbon tax and a requirement of carbon sequestration for all coal power plants.

The creation in January 2009 of a Presidential task force (to look at ways to alter the energy direction of the United States energy providers) favors the trend away from coal-fired power plants.

== Statistics ==
United States coal generation (GWh)
Year	Total	% of total	Jan	Feb	Mar	Apr	May	Jun	Jul	Aug	Sep	Oct	Nov	Dec
2001	1,903,956	50.95%	177,287	149,735	155,269	140,671	151,593	162,616	179,060	183,116	154,158	148,931	144,117	157,402
2002	1,933,130	50.1%	164,358	143,049	151,486	142,305	151,406	164,668	183,195	179,955	165,366	159,099	156,054	172,190
2003	1,973,737	50.83%	181,313	156,982	155,002	141,960	150,263	162,285	181,852	185,332	164,910	159,323	158,223	176,291
2004	1,978,301	49.82%	180,657	161,503	154,288	141,471	157,076	167,642	181,492	178,181	164,253	157,605	157,436	176,755
2005	2,012,873	49.63%	177,014	155,818	163,613	143,083	153,958	174,867	186,091	187,574	171,656	162,437	158,798	177,965
2006	1,990,511	48.97%	169,236	158,616	161,325	141,426	157,010	169,693	187,821	189,455	161,590	161,390	159,440	173,509
2007	2,016,456	48.51%	175,739	163,603	159,811	146,250	157,513	173,513	185,054	190,135	169,391	162,234	159,382	173,830
2008	1,985,801	48.21%	182,876	166,666	160,743	146,983	154,916	171,043	186,733	180,576	161,356	151,841	154,281	167,786
2009	1,755,904	44.45%	171,925	140,916	135,530	125,935	131,673	148,087	158,234	163,260	137,145	139,956	136,810	166,434
2010	1,847,290	44.78%	173,320	153,044	144,406	126,952	143,272	165,491	179,600	177,745	148,746	132,270	135,185	167,258
2011	1,733,430	42.27%	170,803	138,311	134,845	124,488	137,102	158,055	176,586	171,281	140,941	126,627	121,463	132,929
2012	1,514,043	37.4%	129,091	113,872	105,526	96,285	115,983	131,261	160,450	152,181	125,589	120,999	128,727	134,079
2013	1,581,115	38.89%	138,105	123,547	130,634	111,835	119,513	138,283	152,867	149,426	133,110	120,996	120,940	141,860
2014	1,581,710	38.64%	157,097	143,294	136,443	109,281	118,786	137,577	149,627	148,452	126,110	111,296	119,127	124,620
2015	1,352,398	33.17%	132,451	126,977	108,488	88,989	104,585	125,673	139,100	134,670	117,986	96,759	87,227	89,495
2016	1,239,149	30.4%	113,459	92,705	72,173	72,113	81,695	116,034	136,316	135,635	114,118	99,194	86,940	118,747
2017	1,205,835	29.89%	115,333	86,822	89,365	81,335	92,777	107,508	127,698	119,488	98,202	89,776	90,986	106,545
2018	1,149,487	27.51%	119,284	82,050	80,626	73,346	85,227	101,503	115,376	115,129	96,544	87,264	92,819	100,319
2019	964,957	23.38%	100,905	79,929	78,352	59,922	71,885	78,540	100,771	94,040	85,707	66,777	75,549	72,581
2020	773,393	19.3%	65,140	56,201	50,731	40,675	46,527	65,283	89,709	91,145	68,407	59,805	61,182	78,588
2021	897,999	21.85%	81,240	87,470	61,904	53,956	63,873	87,265	101,537	101,855	78,877	62,572	57,426	60,025
2022	831,512	19.65%	87,588	70,966	61,019	55,329	62,532	73,463	86,415	85,215	64,998	54,228	56,377	73,381
2023	675,264	16.16%	61,291	46,488	50,067	40,079	43,852	57,698	78,910	78,185	60,006	50,954	51,229	56,271
2024	652,760	15.17%	75,662	44,055	38,360	37,223	46,328	61,399	71,686	68,838	54,526	46,993	44,990	62,888
2025	737,151	16.64%	83,150	62,262	49,134	45,839	48,744	64,436	80,249	69,728	58,427	54,435	54,490	66,871
2026	257,389	14.49%	72,503	55,859	44,132	39,777	45,119							
Last entry, % of total			18.15%	16.29%	12.65%	12.03%	12.72%	16.39%	17.96%	16.61%	15.87%	15.76%	16.27%	17.5%

== Phase-out ==
Coal generated about 19.5% of the electricity at utility-scale facilities in the United States in 2022, down from 38.6% in 2014 and 51% in 2001. In 2021, coal supplied 9.5 quadrillion British thermal units (2,800 TWh) of primary energy to electric power plants, which made up 90% of coal's contribution to U.S. energy supply.

US electricity generation from coal
Year	Electrical generation from coal (TWh)	Total electrical generation (TWh)	% from coal	Number of coal plants
2002	1,933	3,858	50.1%	633
2003	1,974	3,883	50.8%	629
2004	1,978	3,971	49.8%	625
2005	2,013	4,055	49.6%	619
2006	1,991	4,065	49.0%	616
2007	2,016	4,157	48.5%	606
2008	1,986	4,119	48.2%	598
2009	1,756	3,950	44.4%	593
2010	1,847	4,125	44.8%	580
2011	1,733	4,100	42.3%	589
2012	1,514	4,048	37.4%	557
2013	1,581	4,066	38.9%	518
2014	1,582	4,094	38.6%	491
2015	1,352	4,078	33.2%	427
2016	1,239	4,077	30.4%	381
2017	1,206	4,035	29.9%	359
2018	1,149	4,181	27.5%	336
2019	965	4,131	23.4%	308
2020	773	4,010	19.3%	284
2021	898	4,109	21.9%	269
2022	832	4,230	19.7%	242
2023	675	4,183	16.1%	227

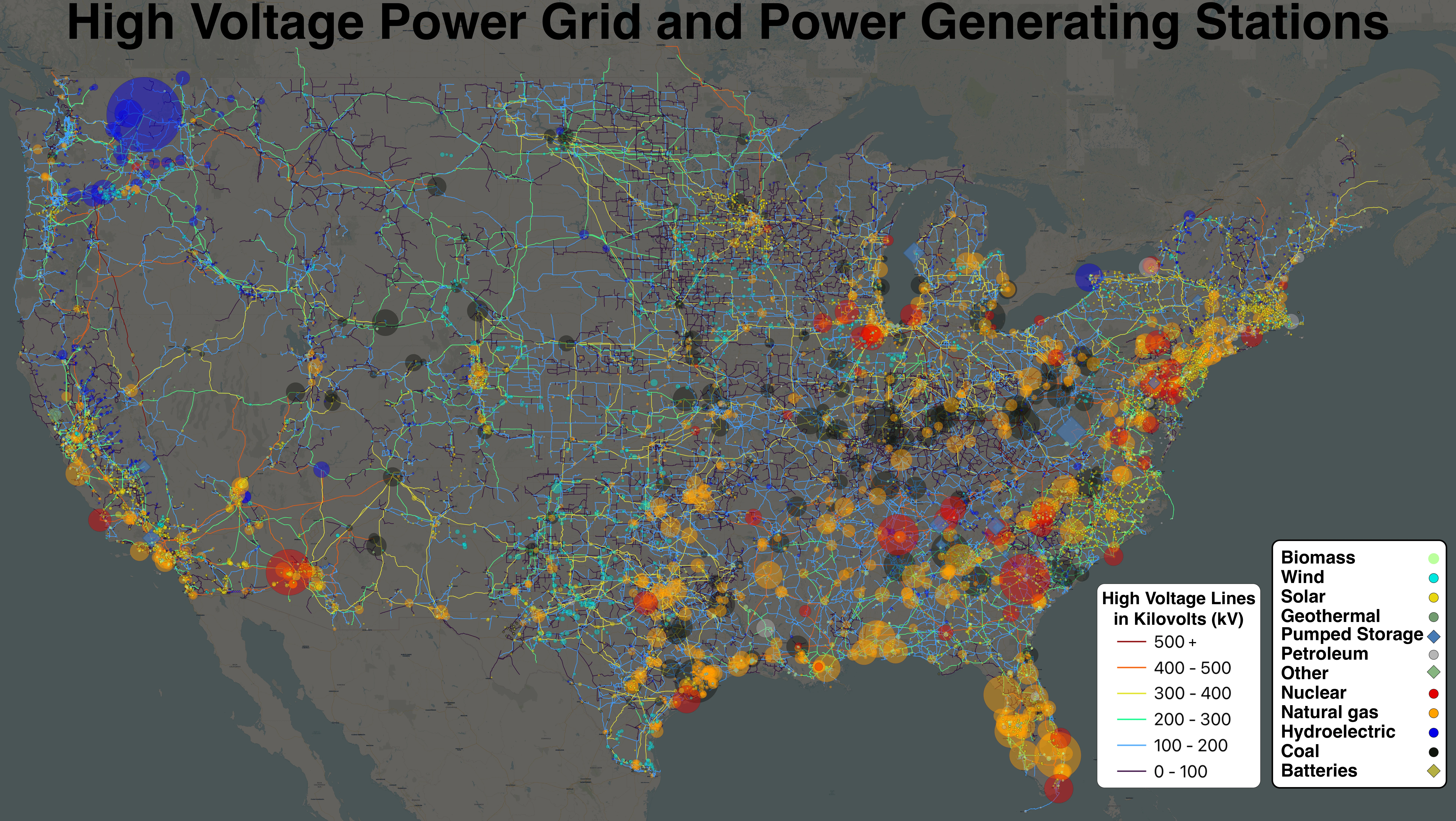
Electrical grid and power plants in the US

In 2007, 154 new coal-fired plants were on the drawing board in 42 states. By 2012, that had dropped to 15, mostly due to new rules limiting mercury emissions, and limiting carbon emissions to 1,000 pounds of CO_{2} per megawatt-hour of electricity produced. In 2013, the last major coal-fired power plant built in the United States, the 932 MW Sandy Creek Energy Station in Texas, was connected to the grid. By September 2022, there were no active plans to expand coal-fired generating capacity in the United States. In 2026 a new 1.25 GW coal fired generator was proposed for Alaska..

In July 2013, United States Secretary of Energy Ernest Moniz outlined the Obama administration's policy on fossil fuels:

In the last four years, we've more than doubled renewable energy generation from wind and solar power. However, coal and other fossil fuels still provide 80 percent of our energy, 70 percent of our electricity, and will be a major part of our energy future for decades. That's why any serious effort to protect our kids from the worst effects of climate change must also include developing, demonstrating and deploying the technologies to use our abundant fossil fuel resources as cleanly as possible.

Then-US Energy Secretary Steven Chu and researchers for the US National Renewable Energy Laboratory have noted that greater electrical generation by non-dispatchable renewables, such as wind and solar, will also increase the need for flexible natural gas-powered generators, to supply electricity during those times when solar and wind power are unavailable. Gas-powered generators have the ability to ramp up and down quickly to meet changing loads.

In November 2021, the US refused to sign up to coal phaseout agreement at the COP26 climate summit.

=== California ===
California's SB 1368 created the first governmental moratorium on new coal plants in the United States. The law was signed in September 2006 by Republican Governor Arnold Schwarzenegger, took effect for investor-owned utilities in January 2007, and took effect for publicly owned utilities in August 2007. SB 1368 applied to long-term investments (five years or more) by California utilities, whether in-state or out-of-state. It set the standard for greenhouse gas emissions at 1,100 pounds of carbon dioxide per megawatt-hour, equal to the emissions of a combined-cycle natural gas plant. This standard created a de facto moratorium on new coal, since it could not be met without carbon capture and sequestration.

=== Maine ===
On 15 April 2008, Maine Governor John Baldacci signed LD 2126, "An Act To Minimize Carbon Dioxide Emissions from New Coal-Powered Industrial and Electrical Generating Facilities in the State." The law, which was sponsored by Rep. W. Bruce MacDonald (D-Boothbay), requires the Board of Environmental Protection to develop greenhouse gas emission standards for coal gasification facilities. It also puts a moratorium in place on building any new coal gasification facilities until the standards are developed.

=== Oregon ===
In early March 2016, Oregon lawmakers approved a plan to stop paying for out-of-state coal plants by 2030 and require a 50 percent renewable energy standard by 2040. Environmental groups such as the American Wind Energy Association and leading Democrats praised the bill.

=== Texas ===
In 2006, a coalition of Texas groups organized a campaign in favor of a statewide moratorium on new coal-fired power plants. The campaign culminated in a "Stop the Coal Rush" mobilization, including rallying and lobbying, at the state capital in Austin on 11 and 12 February 2007. Over 40 citizen groups supported the mobilization.

In January 2007, a resolution calling for a 180-day moratorium on new pulverized coal plants was filed in the Texas Legislature by State Rep. Charles Anderson (R-Waco) as House Concurrent Resolution 43. The resolution was left pending in committee. On 4 December 2007, Rep. Anderson announced his support for two proposed integrated gasification combined cycle (IGCC) coal plants proposed by Luminant (formerly TXU).

=== Washington state ===
Washington has followed the same approach as California, prohibiting coal plants whose emissions would exceed those of natural gas plants. Substitute Senate Bill 6001 (SSB 6001), signed on 3 May 2007, by Governor Christine Gregoire, enacted the standard. As a result of SSB 6001, the Pacific Mountain Energy Center in Kalama was rejected by the state. However, a new plant proposal, the Wallula Energy Resource Center, shows the limits of the "natural gas equivalency" approach as a means of prohibiting new coal plants. The proposed plant would meet the standard set by SSB 6001 by capturing and sequestering a portion (65 percent, according to a plant spokesman) of its carbon.

=== Hawaii ===
Hawaii officially banned the use of coal on September 12, 2020, when Governor Ige enacted Act 23 (SB2629). The law prohibited the issuing or renewing permits for coal power plants after December 31, 2022, and prohibited the extension of the power purchase agreement between AES and Hawaiian Electric. The power purchase agreement for the last coal plant, located on Oahu, expired September 1, 2022, this became the effective retirement date for the coal plant. On September 1, 2022, Hawaii would be completely coal-free with the coal plant's retirement. Hawaii planned to transition to renewable energy to replace the energy produced by coal. The projects slated to replace the coal plant include nine solar plus battery projects, as well as a standalone battery storage project.

== See also ==
- Coal mining in the United States
- Mountaintop removal mining
- Superfund
