= American Coalition for Clean Coal Electricity =

American coal advocacy group

- Abbreviation: ACCCE
- Formation: November 6, 1992; 33 years ago
- Type: 501(c)(6) advocacy group
- Headquarters: Washington, D.C.
- Region served: United States
- President and CEO: Michelle Bloodworth
- Revenue: $18,421,939 (2015)
- Website: www.americaspower.org

The American Coalition for Clean Coal Electricity (ACCCE, formerly ABEC or Americans for Balanced Energy Choices) is a U.S. non-profit advocacy group representing major American coal producers, utility companies and railroads. The organization seeks to influence public opinion and legislation in favor of coal-generated electricity in the United States, placing emphasis on the development and deployment of clean coal technologies.

Since carbon capture and sequestration—which ACCCE and its member companies advocate to reduce greenhouse gas emissions from coal burning—has yet to be tested on a large scale, some have questioned whether this approach is feasible or realistic.

In 2009, ACCCE faced a Congressional investigation when it was discovered that a lobbying firm hired by ACCCE had sent forged letters to lawmakers. The letters, purporting to come from a variety of minority-focused non-profit groups, were in fact forged by a lobbying firm hired by ACCCE.

== History ==
The ACCCE began operations in 2008, the result of a combination of two organizations: the Center for Energy and Economic Development (CEED) and Americans for Balanced Energy Choices (ABEC). CEED had been founded in 1992 and since then had been involved in a wide range of climate and energy policies related to coal-based electricity. ABEC, formed in 2000, had focused on consumer based advocacy programs concerning the use of coal-based electricity. In 2008 these two groups were combined to form ACCCE, with the goal of focusing on both legislative and public advocacy efforts. The main programs include the America's Power campaign, launched in 2007 by ABEC, which had a significant presence during the 2008 and 2012 elections, as well as legislative efforts during the United States House of Representatives debate over the Waxman-Markey cap and trade legislation.

Mike Duncan became President and CEO of ACCCE in 2012. By 2017, Duncan had been succeeded in that position by Paul Bailey, who had previously been named one of the top lobbyists by The Hill, where he was described as ACCCE's "point man for policy... essential in crafting the ACCCE's response" to the positions taken by the Obama administration. Another notable ACCCE lobbyist, Jaime Harrison, was a Democratic political operative, who worked on behalf of ACCCE from 2009 to 2012. Harrison thereafter chaired the South Carolina Democratic Party, and in January 2017 made a bid for DNC chair, which he ended on February 23 with his endorsement of eventual winner Tom Perez. Harrison later accepted an appointment from Perez as Associate Chairman and Counselor of the Democratic National Committee.

In June 2017, Paul Bailey joined Republican leaders including Paul Ryan and Mitch McConnell in welcoming the announcement by President Donald Trump of the United States withdrawal from the Paris Agreement. Bailey stated that "[t]he previous administration volunteered to meet one of the most stringent goals of any country in the world, while many other countries do far less to reduce their emissions", and contended that "[m]eeting President Obama's goal would have led to more regulations, higher energy prices, and dependence on less reliable energy sources". The organization maintains headquarters in Washington, D.C.

== Working methods ==
=== Legislative ===
In addressing comprehensive climate change legislation that would place a cap on greenhouse gas emissions and allow for trading of emission allowances, the position of ACCCE has primarily involved advocating for the development and use of clean coal technologies, while also including provisions concerning the allocating of carbon emission allowances. ACCCE has as also expressed support for a ceiling on emission allowances prices. At the time in 2008 when the U.S. Senate was considering the Lieberman-Warner bill (bill number S. 2191) – which would create a cap and trade system – ACCCE changed its prior stance towards climate-change legislation, noting that it "would support mandatory limits on carbon dioxide as long as legislation met a set of principles that encouraged 'robust utilization of coal.'"

The group also employed legislative efforts surrounding the 2009 debate over the Waxman-Markey cap and trade legislation (bill number H.R. 2454), to which it argued that regulations relating to carbon emissions in the proposed legislation would have led to increased energy costs and reduction in employment – potentially placing additional strain on the economy during the late 2000s recession. ACCCE provided proposals to Members of Congress for changes in this legislation, and approved of some changes that were adopted; though the group did not support the final version of the bill that passed the U.S. House of Representatives on account of concerns that there were not enough measures taken to control energy rates.

=== Advocacy-based ===
In addition to legislative methods employed by ACCCE, the organization has engaged in consumer-focused advocacy efforts in response to perceived environmental effects surrounding clean coal, consisting of direct to consumer advertising, as well as a group of approximately 225,000 volunteers (referred to as "America's Power Army," according to their website) involved in "visiting town hall meetings, fairs and other functions attended by members of Congress (to) ask questions about energy policy."

Initiatives of this form became the subject of news coverage surrounding the 2008 United States presidential election, as the organization's presence at the Democratic National Convention, Republican National Convention, presidential debates and other events has been described as having impacted both Senators John McCain and Barack Obama's positions in regards to investment in clean coal. In the last debate held prior to the election in 2008, Senator Obama noted his support of clean coal technology, when prompted by Senator McCain to explain a time in which he had backed a position not favored by the leaders of the Democratic Party.

The organization actively countered President Obama's climate change agenda, arguing in 2013 that the industry had "made strides toward making coal more environmentally friendly", with ten new clean-coal technology plants having built between 2011 and mid-2013, and five more in development or scheduled to begin operations at that time. Duncan asserted that regulations propounded by the Environmental Protection Agency had contributed to nearly 290 coal plant closures that year, with more likely to come if additional regulations were enacted, and that absent the additional burdens imposed on the industry by such interference, the coal industry would continue developing cleaner technologies. ACCCE supported the FutureGen capture and sequestration project, first announced by President George W. Bush in 2003. The project was funded in the American Recovery and Reinvestment Act of 2009, but the Department of Energy suspended the project in February, 2015.

ACCCE's legislative positions and advocacy-based actions have been met with opposing viewpoints from advocacy groups such as the Sierra Club and Greenpeace, which have questioned the viability of developing environmentally sustainable clean coal within an adequate time frame and budget – representing their perspective that funding of such projects should be sourced exclusively from within the coal industry.

== Climate change denial ==
Since 2009 the Coalition has – according to The Atlantic – "pushed outright denial of climate science". For example in a 2014 report it said that human-caused climate change was a "hypothesis" and a "debate" and claimed that carbon pollution would be beneficial instead of negative and that its benefits could be up to 400 times as high as its costs. It claimed that higher atmospheric carbon dioxide levels would be a benefit and more carbon dioxide had no "discernable influence" on how much sea level would rise.

A 2009 article by Josh Harkinson of Mother Jones magazine said ACCCE was among the most prominent organizations in promoting climate disinformation, grouping it with entities including ExxonMobil, the American Petroleum Institute, The Heartland Institute, and the Institute for Energy Research, as "members of the chorus claiming that global warming is a joke and that CO2 emissions are actually good for you".

== Forgery controversy ==
During the 2009 debate over the Waxman/Markey bill, Bonner & Associates, a Washington, D.C. lobbying firm subcontracted by ACCCE though the Hawthorne Group to drum up "grassroots support" for this effort, sent a number of fraudulent letters to lawmakers on behalf of ACCCE. The letters were forged to appear to come from various minority-focused non-profit groups, including the National Association for the Advancement of Colored People and the American Association of University Women.

When the forgery was exposed, and faced with a proposed Congressional investigation, ACCCE apologized to the community groups and to the members of Congress involved. ACCCE disavowed the tactic and blamed the forgeries on their subcontractor, who in turn blamed a temporary worker, acting alone. The Washington Post described the situation as a "saga of modern Washington, in which an 'American coalition' [the ACCCE] claiming 200,000 supporters still relies on a subcontractor to gin up favorable letters."

An investigation of ACCCE by U.S. Representative Edward Markey, launched in response to the forgeries, disclosed an additional set of fraudulent letters sent to lawmakers to lobby against the environmental legislation. In response to the investigation, the ACCCE pledged to take "all possible steps" to verify the authenticity of letters sent by Bonner & Associates on its behalf, and stated that it was cooperating with Markey's investigation. The investigation concluded in October 2009 with Jack Bonner, chairman of Bonner & Associates, taking “full responsibility” for the forged letters. Bonner and Associates was never paid by ACCCE for their work on the legislation.

== Members ==
As of 2017, ACCCE is supported by 31 member organizations:

- Alliance Coal, LLC
- American Electric Power
- Associated Electric Cooperative Inc.
- Berwind Natural Resource Corp
- Big Rivers Electric Corporation
- BNSF Railway
- Buckeye Power Inc.
- Carbon Utilization Research Council (CURC)
- Caterpillar Incorporated
- Charah
- Crounse Corporation
- CSX Corporation
- Drummond Company, Inc.
- Jackson Walker LLP
- John T. Boyd Company
- Kentucky River Coal Corporation
- Kentucky Coal Association
- Komatsu Mining Corporation
- Murray Energy Corporation
- Natural Resource Partners
- Norfolk Southern Corporation
- Oglethorpe Power Cooperative
- Ohio CAT
- Peabody Energy Corporation
- PowerSouth Energy Cooperative
- Prairie State Generating Company, LLC
- Southern Company
- Trapper Mining
- Union Pacific Railroad
- Western Fuels Association
- White Stallion Energy Center, LLC

== See also ==
- Coal power in the United States
- Clean coal technology
