= FutureGen =

Cancelled coal power station project

Meredosia Power Station
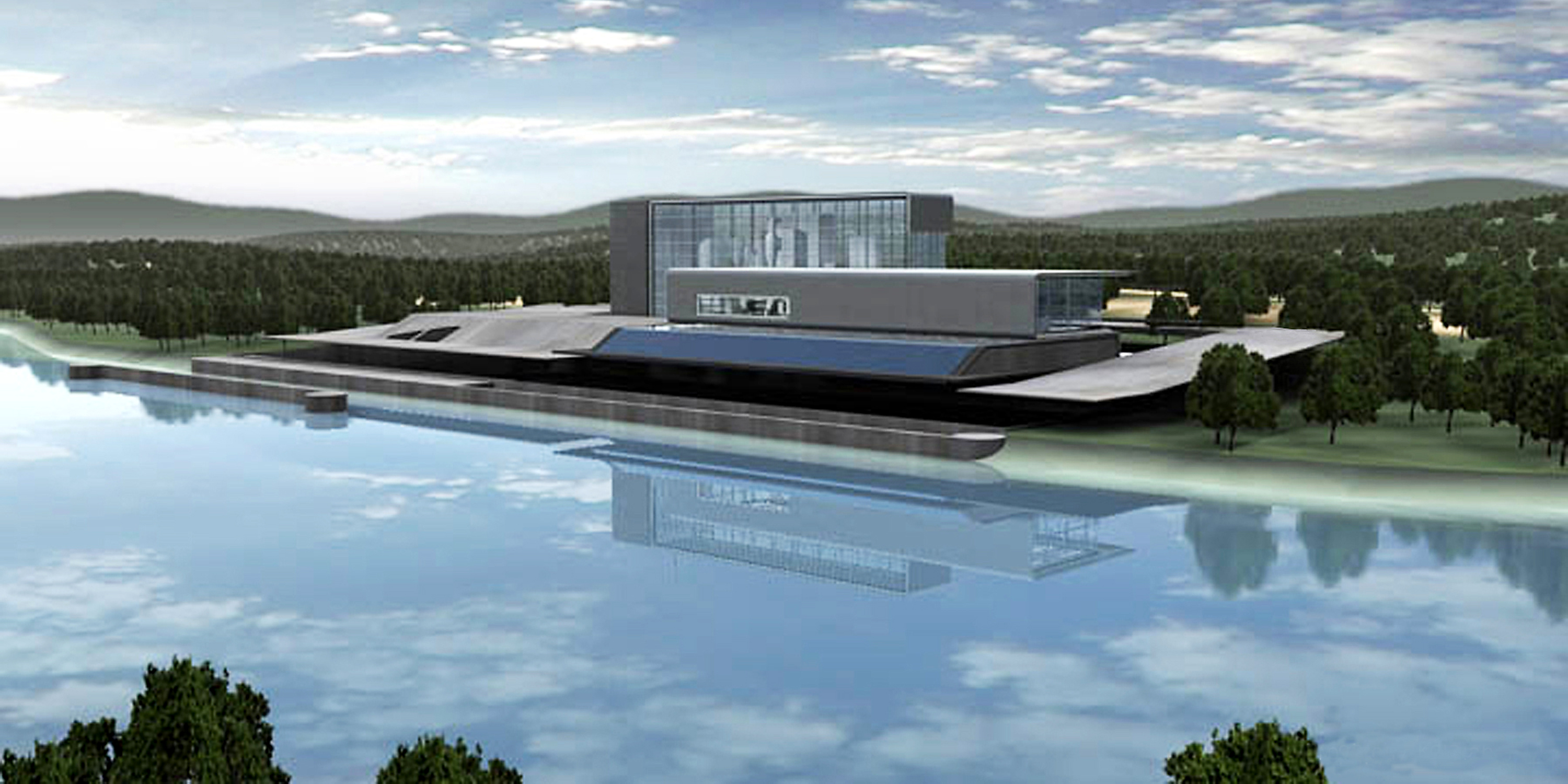
- DOE FutureGen concept art c.2007
- Official name: FutureGen 2.0
- Country: United States
- Location: Morgan County, Illinois
- Coordinates: 39°49′23″N 90°33′58″W
- Status: Cancelled
- Owners: FutureGen Industrial Alliance, Inc

Thermal power station
- Primary fuel: Coal

Power generation
- Nameplate capacity: 229 MW

FutureGen was a project to demonstrate capture and sequestration of waste carbon dioxide from a coal-fired electrical generating station. The project (renamed FutureGen 2.0) was retrofitting a shuttered coal-fired power plant in Meredosia, Illinois, with oxy-combustion generators. The waste CO_{2} would be piped approximately 30 miles (48 km) to be sequestered in underground saline formations. FutureGen was a partnership between the United States government and an alliance of primarily coal-related corporations. Costs were estimated at US$1.65 billion, with $1.0 billion provided by the federal government.

First announced by President George W. Bush in 2003, construction started in 2014 after restructuring, canceling, relocating, and restarting. Citing an inability to commit and spend the funds by deadlines in 2015, the Department of Energy withdrew funds and suspended FutureGen 2.0 in February 2015. The government also cited the alliance's inability to raise the requisite amount of private funding. The Meredosia power plant that had been planned for retrofit was demolished around 2021.

FutureGen 2.0 would have been the most comprehensive Department of Energy carbon capture and storage demonstration project, involving all phases from combustion to sequestration. FutureGen's initial plan involved integrated gasification combined cycle technology to produce both electricity and hydrogen. Early in the project it was to be sited in Mattoon, Illinois.

== Original project ==
The original incarnation of FutureGen was as a public-private partnership to build the world's first near zero-emissions coal-fueled power plant. The 275-megawatt plant would be intended to prove the feasibility of producing electricity and hydrogen from coal while capturing and permanently storing carbon dioxide underground. The Alliance intended to build the plant in Mattoon Township, Coles County, Illinois northwest of Mattoon, Illinois, subject to necessary approvals (issuing a “Record of Decision”) by the Department of Energy (DOE) as part of the National Environmental Policy Act (NEPA) process.

FutureGen was to be designed, developed and operated by the FutureGen Industrial Alliance, a non-profit consortium of coal mining and electric utility companies formed to partner with the DOE on the FutureGen project. The project was still in the development stage when its funding was cancelled in January 2008. The Alliance decision of the location of the host site, subject to DOE's completing NEPA environmental reviews, was announced in December 2007 after a two-year bidding and review process. Construction was scheduled to begin in 2009, with full-scale plant operations to begin in 2012.

The estimated gross project cost, including construction and operations, and excluding offsetting revenue, was $1.65 billion. The project was governed by a legally binding cooperative agreement between DOE and the Alliance. Under the agreement, DOE was to provide 74% of the project’s cost, with private industry contributing the other 26%. The DOE also planned to solicit the financial support and participation of international governments in the FutureGen project, since by 2020 more than 60% of man-made greenhouse gas emissions are expected to come from developing countries. Foreign financial support was to offset a portion of DOE’s cost-share. As of January 2008, the foreign governments of China, India, Australia, South Korea, and Japan had expressed interest in participating and sharing the cost of the project.

FutureGen was to sequester carbon dioxide emissions at a rate of one million metric tons per year for four years, which is the scale a Massachusetts Institute of Technology (MIT) report cites as appropriate for proving sequestration. The MIT report also states that “the priority objective with respect to coal should be the successful large-scale demonstration of the technical, economic, and environmental performance of the technologies that make up all of the major components of a large-scale integrated CCS system — capture, transportation and storage.” An injection field test similar to this was done in Norway.

In March 2009 Washington Post reported that U.S. Secretary of Energy Steven Chu expressed support for continuing the project using stimulus funds (after some changes that have not yet been specified) and making it a part of a larger portfolio of research plants developed in collaboration with other countries.

Following the successful completion of the first phase, in February 2013, the Energy Department announced the beginning of Phase II of the project development with a new cooperative agreement between the FutureGen Industrial Alliance and the Department of Energy. This means that the FutureGen project has government support as it moves into its third phase, deployment of the project.

=== Site selection ===
Site selection for the FutureGen facility was based on a competitive process which began in May 2006. Seven states responded to the Site Request for Proposals with a total of 12 proposals. Proposals were reviewed against a set of environmental, technical, regulatory, and financial criteria with input from external technical advisors on power plant design and carbon sequestration. In July 2006, four candidate sites were selected for further review, including an environmental impact analysis as required by NEPA.

DOE issued its Final Environmental impact statement (EIS) on November 8, 2007, which concluded that all four sites were acceptable from an environmental impact standpoint and all would move forward in the site evaluation process. EPA published a Notice of Availability (NOA) for the EIS in the Federal Register on November 16, 2007. The DOE is required by federal law to wait at least 30 days after the NOA release before issuing its final Record of Decision (ROD). The waiting period legally closed on December 17, 2007. DOE chose not to issue the ROD and advised the FutureGen Alliance to delay the final site selection announcement, which was scheduled to occur at the end of the 30-day waiting period. The Alliance chose to move ahead with the announcement, citing time, money, and a commitment to proposers to select the final site by year-end. "Every month of delay can add $10 million to the project's cost, solely due to inflation," said Michael Mudd, the Alliance's chief executive.

City	Proposals	Finalists
Effingham, Illinois	x	
Marshall, Illinois	x	
Mattoon, Illinois	x	x
Tuscola, Illinois	x	x
Henderson County, Kentucky	x	
Bowman County, North Dakota	x	
Meigs County, Ohio	x	
Tuscarawas County, Ohio	x	
Odessa, Texas	x	x
Jewett, Texas	x	x
Point Pleasant, West Virginia	x	
Gillette, Wyoming	x	

The Michael Mudd, the CEO of the FutureGen Alliance, announced the selection of Mattoon, Illinois as the host site on December 18, 2007. According to the EIS, Mattoon, IL the site is located about 3.5 miles (5.6 km) northwest of downtown Mattoon in the eastern part of Mattoon township section 8 on 1.8 km^{2} (440 acres) of former farm land. The carbon sequestration area is about 8,000 feet (2.4 km) below the ground. In July 2007, Illinois Public Act 095-0018 became law giving the state of Illinois ownership of and liability for the sequestered gases.

=== Technology ===
Original FutureGen project was intended to combine and test several new technologies in a single location, including coal gasification, emissions controls, hydrogen production, electricity generation, and carbon dioxide capture and storage (CCS).

Integrated Gasification Combined Cycle (IGCC) was the core technology behind FutureGen. IGCC power plants use two turbines – a gas and a steam turbine – to produce electric power more efficiently than pulverized coal plants. IGCC plants also make it easier to capture carbon dioxide for carbon sequestration.

FutureGen was to capture carbon dioxide produced during the gasification process and pump it into deep rock formations thousands of feet under ground. FutureGen specifically targeted rock formations containing saline water, as these are one of the most abundant types of geologic formations that can be used to store carbon dioxide worldwide. A study by the Global Energy Technology Strategy Program estimates the storage capacity of these saline rock formations in the U.S. to be 2,970 gigatons of carbon dioxide, compared to a capacity of 77 gigatons of carbon dioxide for all other types of reservoirs, such as depleted gas fields. Focusing on rock formations with saline water was intended to help ensure that the lessons learned from the project are broadly transferable throughout the U.S. and around the world.

=== Challenges ===
Maintaining the project schedule and keeping costs down were two major challenges with which the DOE and the FutureGen Alliance grappled. The project had remained on schedule with the announcement of the host site before the end of 2007; however, a desire by DOE to restructure the project’s financial arrangement has brought the project to a halt.

In December 2007, the DOE Acting Deputy Assistant Secretary for Fossil Energy James Slutz stated that projected cost overruns for the project "require a reassessment of FutureGen's design." And that "This will require restructuring FutureGen to maximize the role of private-sector innovation, facilitate the most productive public-private partnership, and prevent further cost escalation."

The FutureGen Alliance wrote a letter to the Department of Energy’s Under Secretary C.H. “Bud” Albright Jr. stating that overall inflation and the rising cost of raw materials and engineering services are driving costs up on energy projects around the world. According to James L. Connaughton, chairman of the White House Council on Environmental Quality, the market for steel, concrete and power plant components has “just gone through the roof globally”, and much of the reason is the construction of hundreds of new conventional coal plants.

On January 11, 2008, the FutureGen Alliance sent a letter to the DOE offering to lower the government's portion of the project's costs. The initial plans had called for DOE to pay based on a percentage of the total cost, and their portion had risen from about $620 million to about $1.33 billion. The letter indicated that DOE's portion would now be $800 million.

Risk management was a significant portion of the cost of the first FutureGen experimental implementation. FutureGen involved many complex never-before-solved technology problems. The risks also included significant health risks, if the untested-technology systems failed to work correctly.

=== Funding cancellation ===
On January 29, 2008, the U.S. Department of Energy announced that it would pull its funding for the project, mostly due to higher than expected costs. The move is likely to delay the project as other members seek the additional funds that the DOE was to provide. The sudden concern over cost after an Illinois site was chosen over those in Texas raised questions about the motives for the cancellation. Local and state officials in Illinois, including then Governor Rod Blagojevich, expressed frustration at the move, especially in light of the money and resources that the state had spent to attract the project. Democratic Senator Dick Durbin of Illinois accused Energy Secretary Samuel Bodman of "cruel deception" of Illinoisans by "creating false hope in a FutureGen project which he has no intention of funding or supporting." Durbin claimed that "when the city of Mattoon, Illinois, was chosen over possible locations in Texas, the secretary of energy set out to kill FutureGen." Mattoon mayor David Cline said "one could question the motivation of the Department of Energy which was ready to move forward with the project until a site other than Texas was chosen."

In March 2009, Congressional auditors determined that the DOE had miscalculated the government portion of the project's cost, overstating the amount by a half billion dollars. As a result, the Bush administration cited the project as having nearly doubled in cost when, in reality, it had increased by 39%

Secretary Bodman stated that with restructuring the FutureGen project, DOE plans "to equip multiple new clean-coal power plants with advanced CCS technology, instead of one demonstration plant. That will provide more electricity from multiple clean-coal plants, sequestering at least twice as much CO_{2} and providing for wider use and more rapid commercialization."

== Revised plan FutureGen 2.0 ==
=== Plans for continuing FutureGen ===
Despite the cancellation of funding by the DOE, the FutureGen Alliance continued to move forward with the project, opening an office in Mattoon and planning to buy the land for the plant in August 2008, in partnership with a local group.

During the 2008 U.S. presidential campaigns, Sen. Barack Obama pledged his support to clean coal technologies, with plans to develop five commercial-scale coal plants equipped with CCS technology.

In November 2008, Fred Palmer, senior vice president at Peabody Energy shared his outlook on FutureGen with the American Coalition for Clean Coal Electricity (ACCCE), saying that the FutureGen Alliance would "Make a concerted effort in the Obama administration to reinstate the project and get this built as originally planned."

On June 12, 2009, the DOE announced a restart of design work for the FutureGen project. "Following the completion of the detailed cost estimate and fundraising activities," the press release states, "the Department of Energy and the FutureGen Alliance will make a decision either to move forward or to discontinue the project early in 2010."

=== Revised project: FutureGen 2.0 ===
On August 5, 2010, the DOE announced a retooling of the FutureGen project, dubbed FutureGen 2.0. The revised plan includes retrofitting a shuttered coal-fired power plant in Meredosia, Illinois to demonstrate advanced oxy-combustion technology, and piping the carbon dioxide 175 miles to Mattoon for underground storage. Due to these changes, leaders in Mattoon decided to drop out of the FutureGen project.

The Illinois sites vying for the underground storage portion of the project were in Christian, Douglas, Fayette, and Morgan counties, after sites in Adams and Pike counties were cut in December 2010. In February 2011, Morgan County was chosen for the sequestration site.

In Sept, 2014 FutureGen received the first-ever EPA permits for four class VI carbon dioxide sequestration wells in Morgan County, with plans to store 1.1 million metric tons per year for 20 years. Also in 2014 FutureGen survived a lawsuit from Illinois Electric utility ComEd, which challenged the state's ability to impose a surcharge on all customers to pay for FutureGen electricity.

According to critics, including the Illinois Policy Institute, the plan presents major environmental and fiscal pitfalls.

=== FutureGen 2.0 funding cancellation ===
The Department of Energy ordered suspension of FutureGen 2.0 in February, 2015. The funds, appropriated by the American Recovery and Reinvestment Act of 2009, needed to be committed by July 1 and spent by Sept 30, 2015. The government also cited the Alliance's inability to raise the requisite amount of private funding. Energy Secretary Ernest Moniz explained at a press conference “If you look between now and July 1, without them having closed their financing, and try as we might, we just don’t see how it gets over the finish line.” At the time of suspension the power plant part of the project had spent $116.5 million and the sequestration part had spent $86 million.

== Alliance members ==
The FutureGen Industrial Alliance is a consortium of 10 power producers and electric utilities from around the globe.

Company	Headquarters
Anglo American	London, England
BHP Billiton Energy Coal	Melbourne, Australia
China Huaneng Group	Beijing, China
Consol Energy	Pittsburgh, United States
E.ON	Louisville, United States
Foundation Coal	Linthicum Heights, United States
Peabody Energy	St Louis, United States
Rio Tinto	Gillette, United States
Xstrata	Sydney, Australia

=== Former members ===
Four companies initially a part of the FutureGen Industrial Alliance have since dropped out of the project.

Company	Headquarters
American Electric Power	Columbus, United States
Luminant	Dallas, United States
PPL Energy Services Group	Allentown, United States
Southern Company	Atlanta, United States

== See also ==
- Coal pollution mitigation
- Carbon capture and storage
- Combined cycle
- Gasification
- Asia-Pacific Partnership for Clean Development and Climate
- North American Carbon Program
