= Coal pollution mitigation =

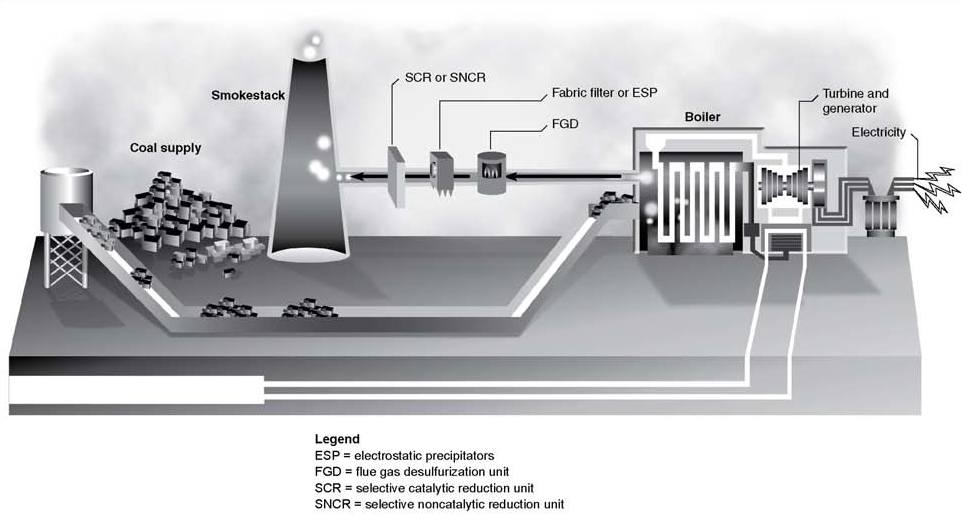
Emissions controls at a coal fired power plant.

Coal pollution mitigation is a series of systems and technologies that seek to mitigate health and environmental impact of burning coal for energy. Burning coal releases harmful substances that contribute to air pollution, acid rain, and greenhouse gas emissions. Mitigation includes precombustion approaches, such as cleaning coal, and post combustion approaches, include flue-gas desulfurization, selective catalytic reduction, electrostatic precipitators, and fly ash reduction. These measures aim to reduce coal's impact on human health and the environment.

The combustion of coal releases diverse chemicals into the air. The main products are water and carbon dioxide, just like the combustion of petroleum. Also released are sulfur dioxide and nitrogen oxides, as well as some mercury. The residue remaining after combustion, coal ash often contains arsenic, mercury, and lead. Finally, the burning of coal, especially anthracite, can release radioactive materials.

== Mitigation technologies ==
Mitigation of coal-based pollution can be divided into several distinct approaches. Coal pollution mitigation seek to minimize negative impacts of coal combustion.

=== Precombustion ===
Prior to its combustion, coal can be cleaned by physical and by chemical means.

Physical cleaning of coal usually involves gravimetric processes, often in conjunction with froth flotation Such processes remove minerals and other noncombustible components of coal, exploiting their greater density vs that of coal. This technology is widely practiced.

Coal can also be cleaned in part by chemical treatments. The concept is to use chemicals to remove deleterious components of coal, leaving the combustible material behind. Typically, coal cleaning entails treatment of crushed coal with acids or bases. This technology is expensive and has rarely moved beyond the demonstration phase. During World War II, German industry removed ash from coal by treatments with hydrofluoric acid and related reagents.

=== Post-combustion ===
The wastes produced by the combustion of coal can be classified into three categories: gases, particulates, and solids (ash). The gaseous products can be filtered and scrubbed to minimize the release of SO_{x,} NO_{x}, mercury:

- SO_{2} can be removed by flue-gas desulfurization
- NO_{2} can be removed by selective catalytic reduction (SCR).
- Mercury emissions can be reduced by up to 95%.

Electrostatic precipitators remove particulates. Wet scrubbers can remove both gases and particulates.

=== Ash ===
The solid residue, coal ash, requires separate set of technologies but usually involves landfilling or some immobilization approaches. Reducing fly ash reduces emissions of radioactive materials.

=== Carbon capture ===
Several different technological methods are available for carbon capture:

- Pre-combustion capture – This involves the gasification of a feedstock (such as coal) to form synthesis gas, which may be shifted to produce an H_{2} and CO_{2}-rich gas mixture, from which the CO_{2} can be efficiently captured and separated, transported, and ultimately sequestered, This technology is usually associated with Integrated Gasification Combined Cycle process configurations.
- Post-combustion capture – This refers to capture of CO_{2} from exhaust gases of combustion processes.
- Oxy–fuel combustion – Fossil fuels such as coal are burned in a mixture of recirculated flue gas and oxygen, rather than in air, which largely eliminates nitrogen from the flue gas enabling efficient, low-cost CO_{2} capture.

=== Satellite monitoring ===
Satellite monitoring is now used to crosscheck national data, for example Sentinel-5 Precursor has shown that Chinese control of SO_{2} has only been partially successful. It has also revealed that low use of technology such as SCR has resulted in high NO_{2} emissions in South Africa and India.

=== Combined cycle power plants ===
A few Integrated gasification combined cycle (IGCC) coal-fired power plants have been built with coal gasification. Although they burn coal more efficiently and therefore emit less pollution, the technology has not generally proved economically viable for coal, except possibly in Japan although this is controversial.

== Case studies ==
In conjunction with enhanced oil recovery and other applications, commercial-scale CCS is currently being tested in several countries. Proposed CCS sites are subjected to extensive investigation and monitoring to avoid potential hazards, which could include leakage of sequestered CO_{2} to the atmosphere, induced geological instability, or contamination of water sources such as oceans and aquifers used for drinking water supplies. As of 2021, the only demonstrator for CCS on a coal plant that stores the gas underground is part of the Boundary Dam Power Station.

The Great Plains Synfuels plant supports the technical feasibility of carbon dioxide sequestration. Carbon dioxide from the coal gasification is shipped to Canada, where it is injected into the ground to aid in oil recovery. A drawback of the carbon sequestration process is that it is expensive compared to traditional processes.

The Kemper County IGCC Project, a proposed 582 MW coal gasification-based power plant, was expected to use pre-combustion capture of CO_{2} to capture 65% of the CO_{2} the plant produces, which would have been utilized and geologically sequestered in enhanced oil recovery operations. However, after many delays and a cost runup to $7.5 billion (triple the initial budget), the coal gasification project was abandoned and as of late 2017, Kemper is under construction as a cheaper natural gas power plant.

The Saskatchewan Government's Boundary Dam Integrated Carbon Capture and Sequestration Demonstration Project will use post-combustion, amine-based scrubber technology to capture 90% of the CO_{2} emitted by Unit 3 of the power plant; this CO_{2} will be pipelined to and utilized for enhanced oil recovery in the Weyburn oil fields.

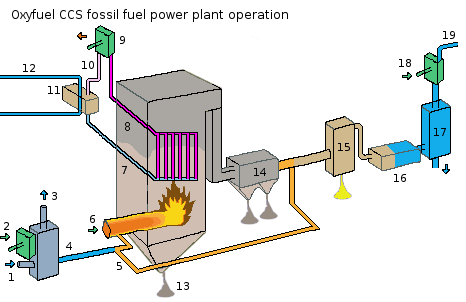
An oxy–fuel CCS power plant operation processes the exhaust gases so as to separate the CO_{2} so that it may be stored or sequestered.

An early example of a coal-based plant using (oxy–fuel) carbon-capture technology is Swedish company Vattenfall’s Schwarze Pumpe power station located in Spremberg, Germany, built by German firm Siemens, which went on-line in September 2008. The facility captures CO_{2} and acid rain producing pollutants, separates them, and compresses the CO_{2} into a liquid. Plans are to inject the CO_{2} into depleted natural gas fields or other geological formations. Vattenfall opines that this technology is considered not to be a final solution for CO_{2} reduction in the atmosphere, but provides an achievable solution in the near term while more desirable alternative solutions to power generation can be made economically practical.

Other examples of oxy-combustion carbon capture are in progress. Callide Power Station has retrofitted a 30-MWth existing PC-fired power plant to operate in oxy–fuel mode; in Ciuden, Spain, Endesa has a newly built 30-MWth oxy–fuel plant using circulating fluidized bed combustion (CFBC) technology. Babcock-ThermoEnergy's Zero Emission Boiler System (ZEBS) is oxy-combustion-based; this system features near 100% carbon-capture and according to company information virtually no air-emissions.

Other carbon capture and storage technologies include those that dewater low-rank coals. Low-rank coals often contain a higher level of moisture content which contains a lower energy content per tonne. This causes a reduced burning efficiency and an increased emissions output. Reduction of moisture from the coal prior to combustion can reduce emissions by up to 50 percent.

In the late 1980s and early 1990s, the U.S. Department of Energy (DOE) conducted projects called the Clean Coal Technology & Clean Coal Power Initiative (CCPI).

== Financial impact ==
Whether carbon capture and storage technology is adopted worldwide will "...depend less on science than on economics. Cleaning coal is very expensive."

=== Cost of converting a single coal-fired power plant ===
Conversion of a conventional coal-fired power plant is done by injecting the CO_{2} into ammonium carbonate after which it is then transported and deposited underground (preferably in soil beneath the sea). This injection process however is by far the most expensive. Besides the cost of the equipment and the ammonium carbonate, the coal-fired power plant also needs to use 30% of its generated heat to do the injection (parasitic load). A test-setup has been done in the American Electric Power Mountaineer coal-burning power plant.

One solution to reduce this thermal loss/parasitic load is to burn the pulverised load with pure oxygen instead of air.

=== Cost implications for new coal-fired power plants ===
Newly built coal-fired power plants can be made to immediately use gasification of the coal prior to combustion. This makes it much easier to separate off the CO_{2} from the exhaust fumes, making the process cheaper. This gasification process is done in new coal-burning power plants such as the coal-burning power plant at Tianjin, called "GreenGen".

== Country by country experiences ==
Local pollution standards include GB13223-2011 (China), India, the Industrial Emissions Directive (EU) and the Clean Air Act (United States).

=== China ===
Since 2006, China releases more CO_{2} than any other country. Researchers in China are focusing on increasing efficiency of burning coal so they can get more power out of less coal. It is estimated that new high efficiency power plants could reduce CO_{2} emission by 7% because they won't have to burn as much coal to get the same amount of power.

As of 2019 costs of retrofitting CCS are unclear and the economics depends partly on how the Chinese national carbon trading scheme progresses.

=== India ===
Pollution led to more than 2.3 million premature deaths in India in 2019, according to a new Lancet study. Nearly 1.6 million deaths were due to air pollution alone, and more than 500,000 were caused by water pollution. India has developed instruments and regulatory powers to mitigate pollution sources but there is no centralized system to drive pollution control efforts and achieve substantial improvements," the study said adding that in 93% of the country, the amount of pollution remains well above the World Health Organization (WHO) guidelines.

=== Canada ===
In 2014, SaskPower, a provincially owned electric utility, completed renovations to Boiler No. 3 at Boundary Dam, making it the world's first post-combustion carbon capture and storage facility. The project cost just over $1.2 billion and can remove CO_{2} and toxins from up to 90 percent of the flue gas it emits.

=== Japan ===
Following the catastrophic failure of the Fukushima I Nuclear Power Plant in Japan that resulted from the 2011 Tōhoku earthquake and tsunami, and the subsequent widespread public opposition against nuclear power, high energy, lower emission (HELE) coal power plants were increasingly favored by the Shinzō Abe-led government to recoup lost energy capacity from the partial shutdown of nuclear power plants in Japan and to replace aging coal and oil-fired power plants, while meeting 2030 emission targets of the Paris Agreement. 45 HELE power plants have been planned, purportedly to employ integrated gasification fuel cell cycle, a further development of integrated gasification combined cycle.

Japan had adopted prior pilot projects on IGCC coal power plants in the early-1990s and late-2000s.

=== U.S. ===
In the United States, clean coal was mentioned by former President George W. Bush on several occasions, including his 2007 State of the Union Address. Bush's position was that carbon capture and storage technologies should be encouraged as one means to reduce the country's dependence on foreign oil.

During the US Presidential campaign for 2008, both candidates John McCain and Barack Obama expressed interest in the development of CCS technologies as part of an overall comprehensive energy plan. The development of pollution mitigation technologies could also create export business for the United States or any other country working on it.

The American Reinvestment and Recovery Act allocated $3.4 billion for advanced carbon capture and storage technologies, including demonstration projects.

Former Secretary of State Hillary Clinton has said that "we should strive to have new electricity generation come from other sources, such as clean coal and renewables", and former Energy Secretary Dr. Steven Chu has said that "It is absolutely worthwhile to invest in carbon capture and storage", noting that even if the U.S. and Europe turned their backs on coal, developing nations like India and China would likely not.

During the first 2012 United States presidential election debate, Mitt Romney expressed his support for clean coal, and claimed that current federal policies were hampering the coal industry.

During the first Trump administration, an Office of Clean Coal and Carbon Management was set up within the United States Department of Energy, but was abolished in the Biden administration. During Trump's second term in office, the office was re-established under the name "Office of Coal".

== See also ==
Health and environmental impact of the coal industry

- Asia-Pacific Partnership on Clean Development and Climate – International non-treaty agreement
- Biochar – Lightweight black residue, made of carbon and ashes, after pyrolysis of biomass
- Carbon capture and storage – Process of capturing and storing carbon dioxide from industrial flue gas
- Carbon sequestration – Storing carbon in a carbon pool
- Carbon sink – Reservoir absorbing more carbon from, than emitting to, the air
- Climate change mitigation – Actions to reduce net greenhouse gas emissions to limit climate change
- Coal mining in the United States
- Coal phase out – Environmental policy intended to stop using coal
- Coal-water slurry fuel – Combustible mixture of coal particles in water
- Coke fuel – Coal product used in the process of making steel
- Environmental impact of the coal industry
- Fluidized bed combustion – Technology used to burn solid fuels
- Kyoto Protocol – 1997 international treaty to reduce greenhouse gas emissions
- Refined coal – Solid fossil fuel
