= Kedzierzyn Zero-Emission Plant =

Proposed Polish facility

Kędzierzyn Zero-Emission Plant
- Country: Poland
- Location: Kędzierzyn-Koźle
- Status: Cancelled
- Owner: PKE

Thermal power station
- Primary fuel: Coal
- Secondary fuel: Biomass
- Combined cycle?: Yes
- Cogeneration?: Yes

Power generation
- Nameplate capacity: 309 MW

The Kędzierzyn Zero-Emission Power and Chemical Complex was a proposed facility in Kędzierzyn-Koźle, Poland. It was planned to combine the functions of power and heat generation with chemical production and carbon capture and storage. The project was proposed by a consortium of chemicals producers, including Zakłady Azotowe Kędzierzyn and the electricity company Południowy Koncern Energetyczny. The facility would have produced synthesis gas by gasification of hard coal. Gas produced by the plant would have been used for power and heat generation, or for the production of other chemicals.

The project has since been discontinued for lack of funding, due in part to the low carbon price as CCS investments generally do not provide large incentives.

== Technical specifications ==
=== Gasification of coal ===
Coal could be converted into synthesis gas by the integrated gasification, combined cycle technology. CO_{2} separation would be required in order to obtain a gas composition adequate for further processing. As a result of the gas purification process, the obtained CO_{2} would maintain a concentration of up to 99%, which permits its commercial use or storage.

== Technical parameters ==
Parameters	Units	Zero-Emission Power & Chemical Complex
Fuel consumption		
power coal	Mtonne/year	2.0
biomass	Mtonne/year	0.25
Thermal power	MWt	137
Electric Power	MWe	300
Synthesis gas production:	Gm^{3}/year	1.55
equivalent methanol quantity	ktonne/year	550
Captured CO_{2}	Mtonne/year	3.38
neutralised (sequestrated) CO_{2}	Mtonne/year	2.5
equivalent contained in synthesis gas for methanol	Mtonne/year	0.84
CO_{2} emissions	%	8^{x}
Reduction of CO_{2} emissions	%	92

Units and abbreviations used are:

- Mtonne: Million tonnes
- ktonne: Thousand tonnes
- Gm^{3}: Billions cubic metre

== Developers ==
The project is developed through cooperation of chemicals producer Zakłady Azotowe Kędzierzyn and electricity company Południowy Koncern Energetyczny.

== Media response ==
The Kędzierzyn Zero-Emission Plant was received with interest by the international press, such as the New York Times, the Guardian, or EurActiv.
