= Tauron Polska Energia =

Polish energy company

Tauron Polska Energia S.A.
- Type: State owned
- Traded as: WSE: TPE
- Industry: Power generation
- Founded: 2006
- Founder: Ministry of State Treasury of Poland
- Headquarters: Katowice, Poland
- Key people: Grzegorz Lot (President of the Management Board); Ilona Malik (Chairman of the supervisory board)
- Products: electric power and heat
- Services: electricity distribution
- Revenue: 4,213,000,000 (2018)
- Net income: 48,100,000 (2018)
- Website: www.tauron.pl (Polish)

Tauron Polska Energia S.A. is an energy holding company in Poland. It is headquartered in Katowice. The company owns power and heat generation and distribution, and coal mining assets through a number of companies, particularly in south-western Poland. It is the second biggest company in terms of energy production in Poland.

The name refers to the Latin word "taurus", meaning bull. In Greek mythology, the bull represented by Zeus, who kidnapped Europa from Tyre.

Tauron was established in December 2006 as Energetyka Południe (Energy South). In 2007, the Ministry of State Treasury of Poland transferred to the company 85% of shares in Południowy Koncern Energetyczny, 85% of shares in Enion, 85% of shares in EnergiaPro, 85% of shares in Elektrownia Stalowa Wola, 95.5% of shares in Elektrociepłownia Tychy, and 95.66% stake in Przedsiębiorstwo Energetyki Cieplnej. As a result, the Tauron Group became one of the largest companies in Poland.

== Sponsorship ==
- The company was the official jersey sponsor of Poland's national basketball team at the 2015 EuroBasket.
- The company is also the strategic sponsor of Polish football club Raków Częstochowa.
- It is also an official partner of New Horizons Film Festival in Wroclaw
