= Integrated gasification combined cycle =

Technology to turn coal into syngas

An integrated gasification combined cycle (IGCC) is a technology using a high pressure gasifier to turn coal and other carbon based fuels into pressurized synthesis gas. This enables removal of impurities from the fuel prior to generating electricity, reducing emissions of sulfur dioxide, particulates, mercury, and in some cases carbon dioxide. Some of these impurities, such as sulfur, can be turned into re-usable byproducts through the Claus process. With additional process equipment, carbon monoxide can be converted to carbon dioxide via water-gas shift reaction, enabling it to be sequestered and increasing gasification efficiency. Excess heat from the primary combustion and syngas fired generation is then passed to a steam cycle, producing additional electricity. This process results in improved thermodynamic efficiency, compared to conventional pulverized coal combustion.

== Significance ==
Coal can be found in abundance in the USA and many other countries and its price has remained relatively constant in recent years. Of the traditional hydrocarbon fuels - oil, coal, and natural gas - coal is used as a feedstock for 40% of global electricity generation. Fossil fuel consumption and its contribution to large-scale CO_{2} emissions is becoming a pressing issue because of the adverse effects of climate change. In particular, coal contains more CO_{2} per BTU than oil or natural gas and is responsible for 43% of CO_{2} emissions from fuel combustion. Thus, the lower emissions that IGCC technology allows through gasification and pre-combustion carbon capture is discussed as a way to addressing aforementioned concerns.

== Operations ==
Below is a schematic flow diagram of an IGCC plant:

Block diagram of IGCC power plant, which utilizes the HRSG

The gasification process can produce syngas from a wide variety of carbon-containing feedstocks, such as high-sulfur coal, heavy petroleum residues, and biomass.

The plant is called integrated because (1) the syngas produced in the gasification section is used as fuel for the gas turbine in the combined cycle and (2) the steam produced by the syngas coolers in the gasification section is used by the steam turbine in the combined cycle. In this example the syngas produced is used as fuel in a gas turbine which produces electrical power. In a normal combined cycle, so-called "waste heat" from the gas turbine exhaust is used in a Heat Recovery Steam Generator (HRSG) to make steam for the steam turbine cycle. An IGCC plant improves the overall process efficiency by adding the higher-temperature steam produced by the gasification process to the steam turbine cycle. This steam is then used in steam turbines to produce additional electrical power.

IGCC plants are advantageous in comparison to conventional coal power plants due to their high thermal efficiency, low non-carbon greenhouse gas emissions, and capability to process low grade coal. The disadvantages include higher capital and maintenance costs, and the amount of CO_{2} released without pre-combustion capture.

== Process overview ==
- The solid coal is gasified to produce syngas, or synthetic gas. Syngas is synthesized by gasifying coal in a closed pressurized reactor with a shortage of oxygen. The shortage of oxygen ensures that coal is broken down by the heat and pressure as opposed to burning completely. The chemical reaction between coal and oxygen produces a product that is a mixture of carbon and hydrogen, or syngas. C_{x}H_{y} + (x/2)O_{2} → (x)CO + (y/2)H_{2}
- The heat from the production of syngas is used to produce steam from cooling water which is then used for steam turbine electricity production.
- The syngas must go through a pre-combustion separation process to remove CO_{2} and other impurities to produce a more purified fuel. Three steps are necessary for the separation of impurities:
1. Water-gas-shift reaction. The reaction that occurs in a water-gas-shift reactor is CO + H_{2}O $\rightleftharpoons$ CO_{2} + H_{2}. This produces a syngas with a higher composition of hydrogen fuel which is more efficient for burning later in combustion.
2. Physical separation process. This can be done through various mechanisms such as absorption, adsorption or membrane separation.
3. Drying, compression and storage/shipping.
- The resulting syngas fuels a combustion turbine that produces electricity. At this stage the syngas is fairly pure H_{2}.

== Benefits and drawbacks ==
A major drawback of using coal as a fuel source is the emission of carbon dioxide and pollutants, including sulfur dioxide, nitrogen oxide, mercury, and particulates. Almost all coal-fired power plants use pulverized coal combustion, which grinds the coal to increase the surface area, burns it to make steam, and runs the steam through a turbine to generate electricity. Pulverized coal plants can only capture carbon dioxide after combustion when it is diluted and harder to separate. In comparison, gasification in IGCC allows for separation and capture of the concentrated and pressurized carbon dioxide before combustion. Syngas cleanup includes filters to remove bulk particulates, scrubbing to remove fine particulates, and solid adsorbents for mercury removal. Additionally, hydrogen gas is used as fuel, which produces no pollutants under combustion.

IGCC also consumes less water than traditional pulverized coal plants. In a pulverized coal plant, coal is burned to produce steam, which is then used to create electricity using a steam turbine. Then steam exhaust must then be condensed with cooling water, and water is lost by evaporation. In IGCC, water consumption is reduced by combustion in a gas turbine, which uses the generated heat to expand air and drive the turbine. Steam is only used to capture the heat from the combustion turbine exhaust for use in a secondary steam turbine. Currently, the major drawback is the high capital cost compared to other forms of power production.

== Installations ==
The DOE Clean Coal Demonstration Project helped construct 3 IGCC plants: Edwarsport Power Station in Edwardsport, Indiana, Polk Power Station in Tampa, Florida (online 1996), and Pinon Pine in Reno, Nevada. In the Reno demonstration project, researchers found that then-current IGCC technology would not work more than 300 feet (100m) above sea level. The DOE report in reference 3 however makes no mention of any altitude effect, and most of the problems were associated with the solid waste extraction system. The Polk Power station is currently operating, following resolution of demonstration start-up problems, but the Piñon Pine project encountered significant problems and was abandoned.

The US DOE's Clean Coal Power Initiative (CCPI Phase 2) selected the Kemper Project as one of two projects to demonstrate the feasibility of low emission coal-fired power plants. Mississippi Power began construction on the Kemper Project in Kemper County, Mississippi, in 2010 and is poised to begin operation in 2016, though there have been many delays. In March, the projected date was further pushed back from early 2016 to August 31, 2016, adding $110 million to the total and putting the project 3 years behind schedule. The electrical plant is a flagship Carbon Capture and Storage (CCS) project that burns lignite coal and utilizes pre-combustion IGCC technology with a projected 65% emission capture rate.

The first generation of IGCC plants polluted less than contemporary coal-based technology, but also polluted water; for example, the Wabash Gasification Facility, located in Vigo County, Indiana, was out of compliance with its water permit during 1998–2001 because it emitted arsenic, selenium and cyanide. Wabash operated commercially until 2016, and was being converted to a low carbon hydrogen and ammonia facility as of 2025.

IGCC is now touted as capture ready and could potentially be used to capture and store carbon dioxide. (See FutureGen) Poland's Kędzierzyn will soon host a Zero-Emission Power & Chemical Plant that combines coal gasification technology with Carbon Capture & Storage (CCS). This installation had been planned, but there has been no information about it since 2009. Other operating IGCC plants in existence around the world are the Alexander (formerly Buggenum) in the Netherlands, Puertollano in Spain, and JGC in Japan. A 575 MW plant, using refinery-residues from Saras S.p.A., is active since 1999 in Sarroch (Sardinia, Italy).

The Texas Clean Energy project planned to build a 400 MW IGCC facility that would incorporate carbon capture, utilization and storage (CCUS) technology. The project would have been the first coal power plant in the United States to combine IGCC and 90% carbon capture and storage. The sponsor Summit Power filed for bankruptcy in 2017.

There are several advantages and disadvantages when compared to conventional post combustion carbon capture and various variations

== Cost and reliability ==
A key issue in implementing IGCC is its high capital cost, which prevents it from competing with other power plant technologies. Currently, ordinary pulverized coal plants are the lowest cost power plant option. The advantage of IGCC comes from the ease of retrofitting existing power plants that could offset the high capital cost. In a 2007 model, IGCC with CCS is the lowest-cost system in all cases. This model compared estimations of levelized cost of electricity, showing IGCC with CCS to cost 71.9 $US2005/MWh, pulverized coal with CCS to cost 88 $US2005/MWh, and natural gas combined cycle with CCS to cost 80.6 $US2005/MWh. The levelized cost of electricity was noticeably sensitive to the price of natural gas and the inclusion of carbon storage and transport costs.

The potential benefit of retrofitting has so far, not offset the cost of IGCC with carbon capture technology. A 2013 report by the U.S. Energy Information Administration demonstrates that the overnight cost of IGCC with CCS has increased 19% since 2010. Amongst the three power plant types, pulverized coal with CCS has an overnight capital cost of $5,227 (2012 dollars)/kW, IGCC with CCS has an overnight capital cost of $6,599 (2012 dollars)/kW, and natural gas combined cycle with CCS has an overnight capital cost of $2,095 (2012 dollars)/kW. Pulverized coal and NGCC costs did not change significantly since 2010. The report further relates that the 19% increase in IGCC cost is due to recent information from IGCC projects that have gone over budget and cost more than expected.

Recent testimony in regulatory proceedings show the cost of IGCC to be twice that predicted by Goddell, from $96 to 104/MWh. That's before addition of carbon capture and sequestration (sequestration has been a mature technology at both Weyburn in Canada (for enhanced oil recovery) and Sleipner in the North Sea at a commercial scale for the past ten years)—capture at a 90% rate is expected to have a $30/MWh additional cost.

Wabash was down repeatedly for long stretches due to gasifier problems. Subsequent projects, such as Excelsior's Mesaba Project, have a third gasifier and train built in.

The Polk County IGCC has design problems. First, the project was initially shut down because of corrosion in the slurry pipeline that fed slurried coal from the rail cars into the gasifier. A new coating for the pipe was developed. Second, the thermocoupler was replaced in less than two years; an indication that the gasifier had problems with a variety of feedstocks; from bituminous to sub-bituminous coal. The gasifier was designed to also handle lower rank lignites. Third, unplanned down time on the gasifier because of refractory liner problems, and those problems were expensive to repair. The gasifier was originally designed in Italy to be half the size of what was built at Polk. Newer ceramic materials may assist in improving gasifier performance and longevity. Understanding the operating problems of the current IGCC plant is necessary to improve the design for the IGCC plant of the future. (Polk IGCC Power Plant, https://web.archive.org/web/20151228085513/http://www.clean-energy.us/projects/polk_florida.html.) Keim, K., 2009, IGCC A Project on Sustainability Management Systems for Plant Re-Design and Re-Image. This is an unpublished paper from Harvard University)

General Electric is currently designing an IGCC model plant that should introduce greater reliability. GE's model features advanced turbines optimized for the coal syngas. Eastman's industrial gasification plant in Kingsport, TN uses a GE Energy solid-fed gasifier. Eastman, a fortune 500 company, built the facility in 1983 without any state or federal subsidies and turns a profit.

There are several refinery-based IGCC plants in Europe that have demonstrated good availability (90-95%) after initial shakedown periods. Several factors help this performance:

1. None of these facilities use advanced technology (F type) gas turbines.
2. All refinery-based plants use refinery residues, rather than coal, as the feedstock. This eliminates coal handling and coal preparation equipment and its problems. Also, there is a much lower level of ash produced in the gasifier, which reduces cleanup and downtime in its gas cooling and cleaning stages.
3. These non-utility plants have recognized the need to treat the gasification system as an up-front chemical processing plant, and have reorganized their operating staff accordingly.

Another IGCC success story has been the 250 MW Buggenum plant in The Netherlands, which was commissioned in 1994 and closed in 2013, had good availability. This coal-based IGCC plant was originally designed to use up to 30% biomass as a supplemental feedstock. The owner, NUON, was paid an incentive fee by the government to use the biomass. NUON has constructed a 1,311 MW IGCC plant in the Netherlands, comprising three 437 MW CCGT units. The Nuon Magnum IGCC power plant was commissioned in 2011, and was officially opened in June 2013. Mitsubishi Heavy Industries has been awarded to construct the power plant. Following a deal with environmental organizations, NUON has been prohibited from using the Magnum plant to burn coal and biomass, until 2020. Because of high gas prices in the Netherlands, two of the three units are currently offline, whilst the third unit sees only low usage levels. The relatively low 59% efficiency of the Magnum plant means that more efficient CCGT plants (such as the Hemweg 9 plant) are preferred to provide (backup) power.

A new generation of IGCC-based coal-fired power plants has been proposed, although none is yet under construction. Projects are being developed by AEP, Duke Energy, and Southern Company in the US, and in Europe by ZAK/PKE, Centrica (UK), E.ON and RWE (both Germany) and NUON (Netherlands). In Minnesota, the state's Dept. of Commerce analysis found IGCC to have the highest cost, with an emissions profile not significantly better than pulverized coal. In Delaware, the Delmarva and state consultant analysis had essentially the same results.

The high cost of IGCC is the biggest obstacle to its integration in the power market; however, most energy executives recognize that carbon regulation is coming soon. Bills requiring carbon reduction are being proposed again both the House and the Senate, and with the Democratic majority it seems likely that with the next President there will be a greater push for carbon regulation. The Supreme Court decision requiring the EPA to regulate carbon (Commonwealth of Massachusetts et al. v. Environmental Protection Agency et al.)[20] also speaks to the likelihood of future carbon regulations coming sooner, rather than later. With carbon capture, the cost of electricity from an IGCC plant would increase approximately 33%. For a natural gas CC, the increase is approximately 46%. For a pulverized coal plant, the increase is approximately 57%. This potential for less expensive carbon capture makes IGCC an attractive choice for keeping low cost coal an available fuel source in a carbon constrained world. However, the industry needs a lot more experience to reduce the risk premium. IGCC with CCS requires some sort of mandate, higher carbon market price, or regulatory framework to properly incentivize the industry.

In Japan, electric power companies, in conjunction with Mitsubishi Heavy Industries has been operating a 200 t/d IGCC pilot plant since the early '90s. In September 2007, they started up a 250 MW demo plant in Nakoso. It runs on air-blown (not oxygen) dry feed coal only. It burns PRB coal with an unburned carbon content ratio of <0.1% and no detected leaching of trace elements. It employs not only F type turbines but G type as well. (see gasification.org link below)

Next generation IGCC plants with CO_{2} capture technology will be expected to have higher thermal efficiency and to hold the cost down because of simplified systems compared to conventional IGCC. The main feature is that instead of using oxygen and nitrogen to gasify coal, they use oxygen and CO_{2}. The main advantage is that it is possible to improve the performance of cold gas efficiency and to reduce the unburned carbon (char).

As a reference for powerplant efficiency:

- With Frame E gas turbine, 30bar quench gas cooling, Cold Temperature Gas Cleaning and 2 level HRSC it is possible to achieve around 38% energy efficiency.
- With Frame F gas turbine, 60 bar quench gasifier, Cold Temperature Gas Cleaning and 3 level+RH HRSC it is possible to achieve around 45% energy efficiency.
- Latest development of Frame G gas turbines, ASU air integration, High temperature desulfurization may shift up performance even further.

The CO_{2} extracted from gas turbine exhaust gas is utilized in this system. Using a closed gas turbine system capable of capturing the CO_{2} by direct compression and liquefication obviates the need for a separation and capture system.

== CO_{2} capture in IGCC ==
Pre-combustion CO_{2} removal is much easier than CO_{2} removal from flue gas in post-combustion capture due to the high concentration of CO_{2} after the water-gas-shift reaction and the high pressure of the syngas. During pre-combustion in IGCC, the partial pressure of CO_{2} is nearly 1000 times higher than in post-combustion flue gas. Due to the high concentration of CO_{2} pre-combustion, physical solvents, such as Selexol and Rectisol, are preferred for the removal of CO_{2} vs that of chemical solvents. Physical solvents work by absorbing the acid gases without the need of a chemical reaction as in traditional amine based solvents. The solvent can then be regenerated, and the CO_{2} desorbed, by reducing the pressure. The biggest obstacle with physical solvents is the need to cool the syngas before separation, then reheat it afterwards for combustion, consuming energy and decreasing overall plant efficiency.

== Testing ==
National and international test codes are used to standardize the procedures and definitions used to test IGCC Power Plants. Selection of the test code to be used is an agreement between the purchaser and the manufacturer, and has some significance to the design of the plant and associated systems. In the United States, The American Society of Mechanical Engineers published the Performance Test Code for IGCC Power Generation Plants (PTC 47) in 2006 which provides procedures for the determination of quantity and quality of fuel gas by its flow rate, temperature, pressure, composition, heating value, and its content of contaminants.

== IGCC emission controversy ==
In 2007, the New York State Attorney General's office demanded full disclosure of "financial risks from greenhouse gases" to the shareholders of electric power companies proposing the development of IGCC coal-fired power plants. "Any one of the several new or likely regulatory initiatives for CO_{2} emissions from power plants - including state carbon controls, EPA's regulations under the Clean Air Act, or the enactment of federal global warming legislation - would add a significant cost to carbon-intensive coal generation"; U.S. Senator Hillary Clinton from New York has proposed that this full risk disclosure be required of all publicly traded power companies nationwide. This honest disclosure has begun to reduce investor interest in all types of existing-technology coal-fired power plant development, including IGCC.

Senator Harry Reid (Majority Leader of the 2007/2008 U.S. Senate) told the 2007 Clean Energy Summit that he will do everything he can to stop construction of proposed new IGCC coal-fired electric power plants in Nevada. Reid wants Nevada utility companies to invest in solar energy, wind energy and geothermal energy instead of coal technologies. Reid stated that global warming is a reality, and just one proposed coal-fired plant would contribute to it by burning seven million tons of coal a year. The long-term healthcare costs would be far too high, he claimed (no source attributed). "I'm going to do everything I can to stop these plants.", he said. "There is no clean coal technology. There is cleaner coal technology, but there is no clean coal technology."

== See also ==
- Relative cost of electricity generated by different sources
- Environmental impact of the coal industry
- Integrated Gasification Fuel Cell Cycle
- Substitute natural gas
