= North American Carbon Program =

Visualization showing forest change in various locations from 1986 to 2010, part of the NACP.

The North American Carbon Program (NACP) is a community-driven element of the U.S. Carbon Cycle Science Program, which established it as one of the major elements of the 2002 Strategic Plan for the U.S. Climate Change Science Program (now called the US Global Change Research Program or USGCRP). The central objective of NACP is to measure and understand carbon stocks and sources and sinks of carbon dioxide (CO_{2}), methane (CH_{4}), and carbon monoxide (CO) in North America and adjacent ocean regions.

This program consists of multiple agencies that focus on changes to the carbon cycle. Not only does this program rely on research conducted by multiple agencies, but it is also supported by federal agencies that assist in the funding of this program. To ensure the plan is effective, the Science Leadership Group (SLG) works to communicate among government program managers, independent research groups, and multiple institutions not affiliated to the government as well.

Alongside the SLG, there is the Carbon Cycle Interagency Working Group (CCIWG), which interacts across agencies and ensures the efficiency of research about the carbon cycle in the United States. It works with 11 federal agencies like the National Aeronautics and Space Administration (NASA), National Institute of Standards and Technology (NIST), US Department of Agriculture (USDA), and the US Environmental Protection Agency (EPA). The CCIWG specializes in communicating among agencies for the proposal of new projects, secures resources for the various research programs available, and reports results to the public.

== Program Goals ==
The specific program goals are:

Develop quantitative scientific knowledge, robust observations, and models to determine the emissions and uptake of CO_{2}, CH_{4}, and CO, changes in carbon stocks, and the factors regulating these processes for North America and adjacent ocean basins.

Develop the scientific basis to implement full carbon accounting on regional and continental scales. This is the knowledge base needed to design monitoring programs for natural and managed CO_{2} sinks and emissions of CH_{4}.

Support long-term quantitative measurements of fluxes, sources, and sinks of atmospheric CO_{2} and CH_{4}, and develop forecasts for future trends.

The North American Carbon Program was designed to help with the process of providing data needed to model the synthesis activities.

== The Carbon Cycle ==
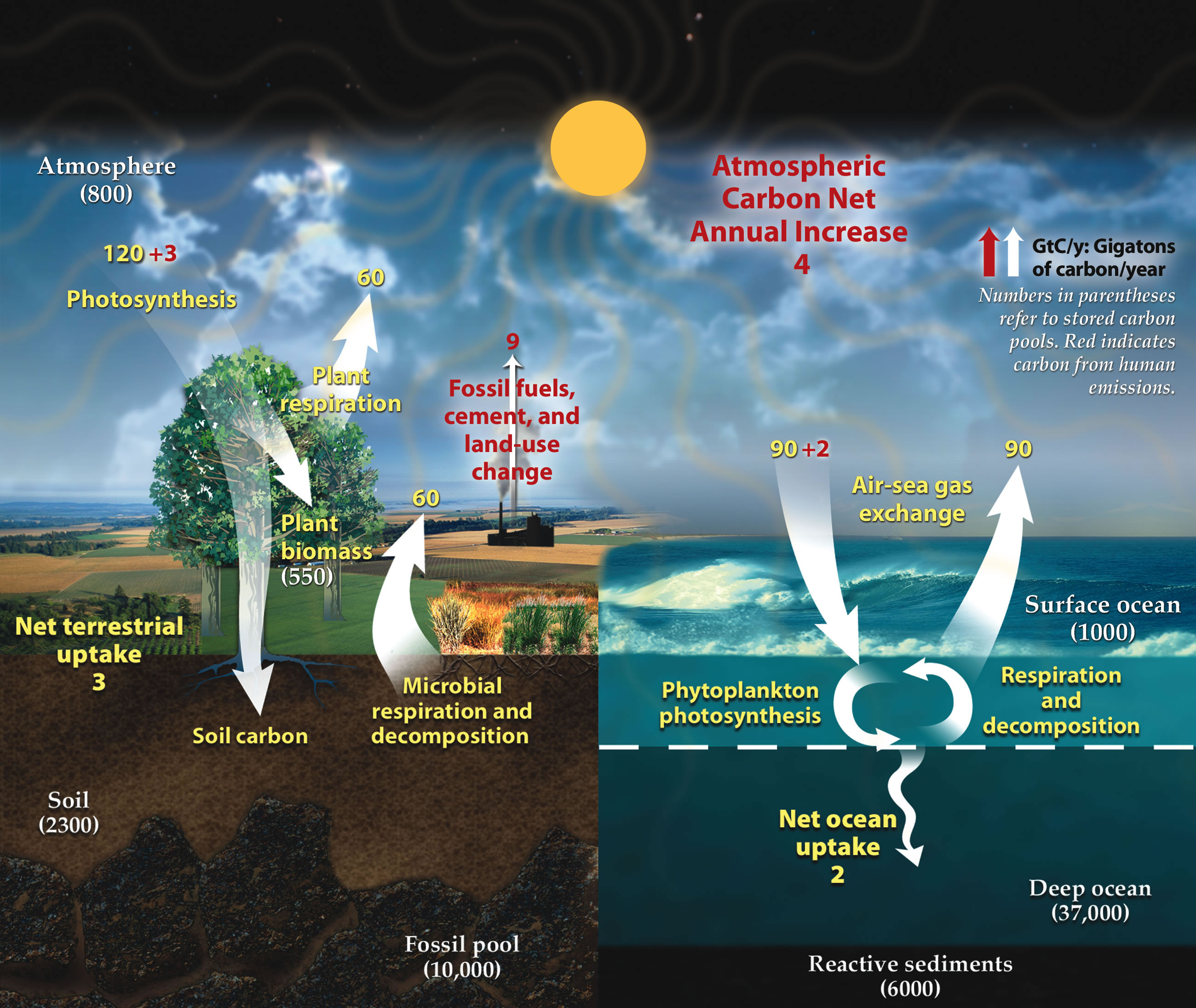
This diagram simplifies the carbon cycle, a complex cycle that the North American Carbon Program focuses on.

The carbon cycle is subdivided into two sections, the rapid carbon exchange, and long-term cycling of carbon through the various geological processes.

=== Rapid exchange ===
This carbon cycle occurs in our biological processes, including respiration, photosynthesis, and is generated by autotrophs.

Autotrophs (usually photosynthetic) are plants or algae, which capture the carbon dioxide from the air. In water, the compounds removed are bicarbonate ions. They are converted into organic compounds like glucose. Heterotrophs consume the glucose, which further breaks down the compounds and passes them through webs (this process is called cellular respiration). Living systems and decomposers release the carbons as carbon dioxide. This carbon is cycled quickly, with estimates of 1,000 to 1000,000 million metric tons of carbon cycling through these pathways in a single year.

=== Long-term exchange ===
Like its name implies, this pathway takes longer than the pathway above, sometimes lasting millions of years. This form of carbon is found in rocks, in the ocean and other bodies of water, inside the core, and in fossil fuels. It is also found in the atmosphere, where it reacts with water and forms calcium carbonate- found in the shells of marine organisms which later become part of the sediment on the ocean floor.

Over time, the remains of shells, plants, and animals form fossils that are later decomposed and released once again as carbon dioxide into the atmosphere.

Through volcanoes and eruptions, as well as hydrothermal vents, carbon dioxide is released.

== See also ==
- Carbon sink
- Futuregen
- Greenhouse effect
- Regional Greenhouse Gas Initiative

 http://www.nacarbon.org/cgi-bin/google_maps/google_map_all.pl?
