= Tauron Wytwarzanie =

Polish power generation company

Tauron Wytwarzanie S.A.
- Industry: Electricity
- Founded: 24 May 2000
- Headquarters: Jaworzno, Poland
- Products: Electrical power Heat
- Parent: Tauron Group
- Website: pke.pl

Tauron Wytwarzanie S.A. (former name: Południowy Koncern Energetyczny S.A.) is a power generation company based in Jaworzno, Poland. It is the Poland's third largest power producer having a 14% stake of the domestic installed electrical power capacity (5.3 GWe) and a 16% stake of the local heat generation market (2.4 GWt).

The company is a part of the Tauron Group, one of Poland's biggest business entities. In 2007, its consolidated revenue amounted to PLN 3.6 billion (€805 million), with a net profit of PLN 137.6 million (€31 million).

== See also ==
- Energy in Poland
- Energy law
