= Bonner & Associates =

American lobbying company

- Industry: Public Relations
- Founded: 1984
- Founder: Jack Bonner

Bonner & Associates is an American lobbying company established in 1984.

== History ==
Bonner & Associates was founded in Washington, D.C. by Jack Bonner as a public relations firm. Bonner was previously the Director for Community Relations for the City of Tucson, Arizona and also served as a top aid for U.S. Senator John Heinz (PA).

Bonner & Associates was one of the early public affairs companies involved in many large scale campaigns for a wide range of clients at the local, state, and federal levels of government. The company has been listed as the “pioneer of grassroots efforts” by The Wall Street Journal and The New York Times and has been featured on C-SPAN explaining their approach to grassroots lobbying. They have worked with Fortune 500 corporations, associations, and non-profits to help their clients win legislative and/or regulatory fights and promote publicity programs.

The firm's impact on important legislative issues such as taxation, healthcare, transportation, and international trade has been recognized since the 1990s.

== Criticism ==
- On December 18, 1986, The New York Times reported that the company was hired to run a toll free line for people to request “What Works: Schools Without Drugs,” a free book on drug abuse. The program received several large requests for the book. After an internal investigation, the management at Bonner & Associates found several employees in direct violation of the policy of the firm and the contract by adding names and addresses compiled from sources other than the toll free number assigned for that purpose. The firm fired the employees and immediately reported their actions to the government.
- On December 3, 1994, National Journal reported that Bonner was hired by Philip Morris to oppose nonsmoking laws in several states.
- On March 9, 2002, The Baltimore Sun reported that Bonner was hired by PhRMA to oppose subsidized prescription drug programs for seniors.
- In 2009, Bonner found that a company employee was violating their company policy and was forging anti-climate bill letters to Rep. Tom Perriello (Dem-VA). The letters were supposedly from local minority groups, like the Charlottesville NAACP or Creciendo Juntos—complete with their stationery—and urged him to oppose the ACES climate change bill. The company immediately fired the employee they said was responsible and apologized.

== Bibliography ==
- Jeffrey H. Birnbaum, Alan S. Murray (1988). Showdown at Gucci Gulch: lawmakers, lobbyists, and the unlikely triumph of tax reform.
- Haynes Johnson, David S. Broder (2009). The System: The American Way of Politics at the Breaking Point. ISBN 031608395X.
- Mira Kamdar (2008). Planet India: The Turbulent Rise of the Largest Democracy and the Future of our World by Mira Kamdar. ISBN 0743296869.
- Kenneth M. Goldstein (1999). Interest Groups, Lobbying, and Participation in America by Kenneth M. Goldstein. Cambridge University Press. ISBN 052163962X.
- Amy Fried (1997). Muffled Echoes – Oliver North and the Politics of Public Opinion. ISBN 0231108206.
