= List of carbon capture and storage projects =

Global capture capacity has trended higher since 2017.

This List of carbon capture and storage projects provides documentation of global, industrial-scale projects for carbon capture and storage. According to the Global CCS Institute, in 2020 some 40 million tons CO_{2} per year capacity of CCS was in operation with 50 million tons per year in development. The world emits about 38 billion tonnes of CO_{2} every year, so CCS captured about one thousandth of the 2020 total.

== Algeria ==
In Salah was an operational onshore gas field with CO_{2} injection. CO_{2} was separated from produced gas and reinjected into the Krechba geologic formation at a depth of 1,900m. Since 2004, about 3.8 Mt of CO_{2} has been captured during natural gas extraction and stored. Injection was suspended temporarily in June 2011 due to concerns about the integrity of the seal, potential for fracture and leakage into the caprock, and movement of CO_{2} outside of the Krechba hydrocarbon lease. Injection has not restarted and no leakage of CO_{2} was reported during the lifetime of the project

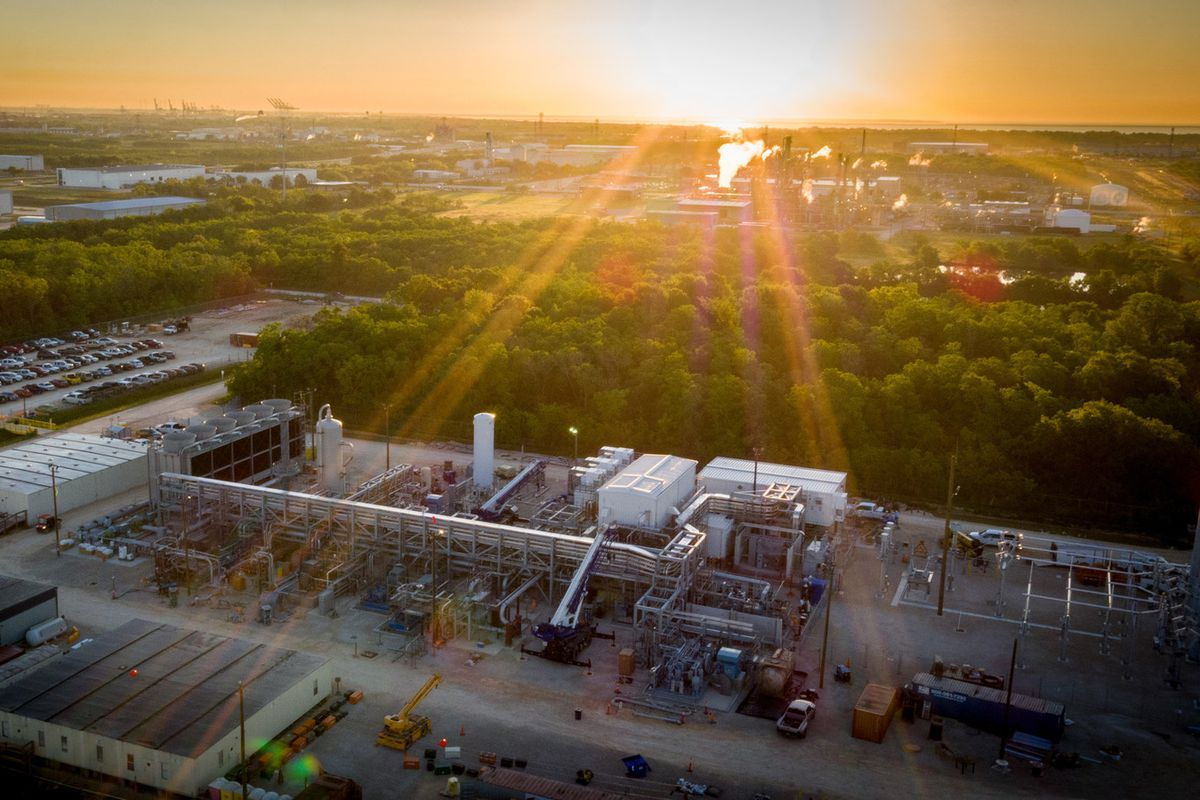
NET Power Facility. La Porte, Tx

== Australia ==
In the early 2020s the government allocated over A$300 million for CCS both onshore and offshore.

== Canada ==
Canadian governments committed $1.8 billion fund CCS projects over the 2008-2018 period. The main programs are the federal government's Clean Energy Fund, Alberta's Carbon Capture and Storage fund, and the governments of Saskatchewan, British Columbia, and Nova Scotia. Canada works closely with the United States through the U.S.–Canada Clean Energy Dialogue launched by the Obama administration in 2009.

=== Alberta ===
Alberta committed $170 million in 2013/2014 – and a total of $1.3 billion over 15 years – to fund two large-scale CCS projects.

The CAN $1.2 billion Alberta Carbon Trunk Line Project (ACTL), pioneered by Enhance Energy, became fully operational in June 2020. It is now the world's largest carbon capture and storage system consisting of a 240 km pipeline that collects CO_{2} industrial emissions from the Agrium fertilizer plant and North West Sturgeon Refinery in Alberta. The capture is then delivered to the matured Clive oil reservoir for use in EOR (enhanced oil recovery) and permanent storage. At full capacity, it can capture 14.6 million tonnes of CO_{2} per year. For perspective, that translates into capturing CO_{2} from 2.6 million cars plus.

The Quest Carbon Capture and Storage Project was developed by Shell Canada for use in the Athabasca Oil Sands Project. It is cited as being the world's first commercial-scale CCS project. Construction began in 2012 and ended in 2015. The capture unit is located at the Scotford Upgrader in Alberta, Canada, where hydrogen is produced to upgrade bitumen from oil sands into synthetic crude oil. The steam methane units that produce the hydrogen emit CO_{2} as a byproduct. The capture unit captures the CO_{2} from the steam methane unit using amine absorption technology, and the captured CO_{2} is then transported to Fort Saskatchewan where it is injected into a porous rock formation called the Basal Cambrian Sands. From 2015 to 2018, the project stored 3 Mt CO_{2} at a rate of 1 Mtpa.

Entropy, a subsidiary of Advantage Energy runs a sequestration project at Glacier plant near Valhalla, Alberta, storing 0.2 MT of CO_{2} per year as of 2022.

In 2022, Alberta Energy granted 25 CO_{2} sequestration evaluation licenses covering a total area of 10 million hectares.

=== Saskatchewan ===
==== Boundary Dam Power Station Unit 3 Project ====
Boundary Dam Power Station, owned by SaskPower, is a coal fired station originally commissioned in 1959. In 2010, SaskPower committed to retrofitting the lignite-powered Unit 3 with a carbon capture unit. The project was completed in 2014. The retrofit utilized a post-combustion amine absorption technology. The captured CO_{2} was to be sold to Cenovus to be used for Enhanced Oil Recovery (EOR) in Weyburn field. Any CO_{2} not used for EOR was planned to be used by the Aquistore project and stored in deep saline aquifers. Many complications kept Unit 3 and this project from operating as much as expected, but between August 2017 – August 2018, Unit 3 was online for 65%/day on average. The project has a nameplate capacity of capture of 1 Mtpa. The other units are to be phased out by 2024. The future of the one retrofitted unit is unclear.

==== Great Plains Synfuel Plant and Weyburn-Midale Project ====
The Great Plains Synfuel Plant, owned by Dakota Gas, is a coal gasification operation that produces synthetic natural gas and various petrochemicals from coal. The plant began operation in 1984, while CCS began in 2000. In 2000, Dakota Gas retrofitted the plant and planned to sell the CO_{2} to Cenovus and Apache Energy, for EOR in the Weyburn and Midale fields in Canada. The Midale fields were injected with 0.4 Mtpa and the Weyburn fields are injected with 2.4 Mtpa for a total injection capacity of 2.8 Mtpa. The Weyburn-Midale Carbon Dioxide Project (or IEA GHG Weyburn-Midale CO_{2} Monitoring and Storage Project), was conducted there. Injection continued even after the study concluded. Between 2000 and 2018, over 30 Mt CO_{2} was injected.

== China ==
As of 2019 coal accounted for around 60% of China's energy production. The majority of CO_{2} emissions come from coal-fired power plants or coal-to-chemical processes (e.g. the production of synthetic ammonia, methanol, fertilizer, natural gas, and CTLs). According to the IEA, around 385 out of China's 900 gigawatts of coal-fired power capacity are near locations suitable for CCS. As of 2017 three CCS facilities are operational or in late stages of construction, drawing CO_{2} from natural gas processing or petrochemical production. At least eight more facilities are in early planning and development, most of which target power plant emissions, with an injection target of EOR.

China's largest carbon capture and storage plant at Guohua Jinjie coal power station was completed in January 2021. The project is expected to prevent 150,000 tons of carbon dioxide emission annually at a 90% capture rate.

=== CNPC Jilin Oil Field ===
China's first carbon capture project was the Jilin oil field in Songyuan, Jilin Province. It started as a pilot EOR project in 2009, and developed into a commercial operation for the China National Petroleum Corporation (CNPC). The final development phase completed in 2018. The source of CO_{2} is the nearby Changling gas field, from which natural gas with about 22.5% is extracted. After separation at the natural gas processing plant, the CO_{2} is transported to Jilin via pipeline and injected for a 37% enhancement in oil recovery at the low-permeability oil field. At commercial capacity, the facility currently injects 0.6 Mt CO_{2} per year, and it has injected a cumulative total of over 1.1 million tonnes over its lifetime.

=== Sinopec Qilu Petrochemical CCS Project ===
Sinopec is developing a carbon capture unit whose first phase was to be operational in 2019. The facility is located in Zibo City, Shandong Province, where a fertilizer plant produces CO_{2} from coal/coke gasification. CO_{2} is to be captured by cryogenic distillation and will be transported via pipeline to the nearby Shengli oil field for EOR. Construction of the first phase began by 2018, and was expected to capture and inject 0.4 Mt CO_{2} per year. The Shengli oil field is the destination for CO_{2}.

=== Yanchang Integrated CCS Project ===
Yanchang Petroleum is developing carbon capture facilities at two coal-to-chemical plants in Yulin City, Shaanxi Province. The first capture plant is capable of capturing 50,000 tonnes per year and was finished in 2012. Construction on the second plant started in 2014 and was expected to be finished in 2020, with a capacity of 360,000 tonnes per year. This CO_{2} will be transported to the Ordos Basin, one of China's largest coal, oil, and gas-producing regions with a series of low- and ultra-low permeability oil reservoirs. Lack of water has limited the use of water for EOR, so the CO_{2} increase production.

== Germany ==
From 2008 until 2014 the Schwarze Pumpe power station, about 4 kilometres (2.5 mi) south of the city of Spremberg, was home to the world's first demonstration CCS coal plant. The mini pilot plant was run by an Alstom-built oxy–fuel boiler and is also equipped with a flue gas cleaning facility to remove fly ash and sulfur dioxide. The Swedish company Vattenfall AB invested some €70 million in the two-year project, which began operation 9 September 2008. The power plant, which is rated at 30 megawatts, was a pilot project to serve as a prototype for future full-scale power plants. 240 tonnes a day of CO_{2} were being trucked 350 kilometers (220 mi) to be injected into an empty gas field. Germany's BUND group called it a "fig leaf". For each tonne of coal burned, 3.6 tonnes of CO_{2} was produced. The CCS program at Schwarze Pumpe ended in 2014 due to nonviable costs and energy use.

As of 2007, the German utility RWE operated a pilot-scale CO_{2} scrubber at the lignite-fired Niederaußem power station built in cooperation with BASF (supplier of detergent) and Linde engineering.

== Japan ==
The Tomakomai CCS Demonstration Project is an ongoing project led by Japan CCS Co., Ltd. (JCCS) in Tomakomai, Hokkaido prefecture. Funded by METI and commissioned by NEDO, JCCS has been leading CCS-related researches, including CO_{2} capture, injection and geological measurements at its Tomakomai site since 2012, although CO_{2} injection has been concluded since November 22, 2019 after reaching 300,012 tons of injected CO_{2}, slightly above the initially proposed 300,000 tons.

The source of the CO_{2} was Idemitsu Kosan's nearby oil refinery, which was connected to the Tomakomai CCS site via an 1.4km (0.87mi) pipeline. After amine gas treating a CO_{2} purity of 99% or higher has been achieved, which was then sent to the injection facility, where it was compressed and then injected into two separate undersea reservoirs. The reservoirs are located in the Lower Quaternary Moebetsu (which consists of sandstone) and the Miocene Takinoue (which consists of volcanic and volclaniclastic rocks) formation, located 1000 to 1200m (3280 to 3940ft) and 2400 to 3000m (7875 to 9840ft) deep respectively. In the future the facility may serve as a trial site for transferring liquefied CO_{2} from vessels directly into the reservoirs.

After the 2018 Hokkaido Eastern Iburi earthquake, a survey conducted by JCCS revealed that the reservoirs did not sustain any detectable damage, as well as no direct link between the earthquake and the CCS facility could be established.

== Netherlands ==
Developed in the Netherlands, an electrocatalysis by a copper complex helps reduce CO_{2} to oxalic acid.

== Norway ==
In Norway, the CO_{2} Technology Centre (TCM) at Mongstad began construction in 2009, and completed in 2012. It includes two capture technology plants (one advanced amine and one chilled ammonia), both capturing flue gas from two sources. This includes a gas-fired power plant and refinery cracker flue gas (similar to coal-fired power plant flue gas).

In addition to this, the Mongstad site was also planned to have a full-scale CCS demonstration plant. The project was delayed to 2014, 2018, and then indefinitely. The project cost rose to US$985 million. Then in October 2011, Aker Solutions' wrote off its investment in Aker Clean Carbon, declaring the carbon sequestration market to be "dead".

On 1 October 2013, Norway asked Gassnova, its Norwegian state enterprise for carbon capture and storage, not to sign any contracts for carbon capture and storage outside Mongstad.

In 2015 Norway was reviewing feasibility studies and hoping to have a full-scale carbon capture demonstration project by 2020.

In 2020, it then announced "Longship" ("Langskip" in Norwegian). This 2,7 billion CCS project will capture and store the carbon emissions of Norcem's cement factory in Brevik. Also, it plans to fund Fortum Oslo's Varme waste incineration facility. Finally, it will fund the transport and storage project "Northern Lights", a joint project between Equinor, Shell and Total. This latter project will transport liquid CO_{2} from capture facilities to a terminal at Øygarden Municipality in Vestland County. From there, CO_{2} will be pumped through pipelines to a reservoir beneath the seabed. The first two CO_{2} carrier ships for the Øygarden terminal were under construction at Dalian Shipbuilding in China in 2022. They are being equipped with rotor sails estimated to cut emissions by 5%. Øygarden is the world's first open-access transport and storage infrastructure.

=== Sleipner CO_{2} Injection ===
Sleipner is a fully operational offshore gas field with CO_{2} injection initiated in 1996. CO_{2} is separated from produced gas and reinjected in the Utsira saline aquifer (800–1000 m below ocean floor) above the hydrocarbon reservoir zones. This aquifer extends much further north from the Sleipner facility at its southern extreme. The large size of the reservoir accounts for why 600 billion tonnes of CO_{2} are expected to be stored, long after the Sleipner natural gas project has ended. The Sleipner facility is the first project to inject its captured CO_{2} into a geological feature for the purpose of storage rather than economically compromising EOR.

== United Arab Emirates ==
After the success of their pilot plant operation in November 2011, the Abu Dhabi National Oil Company and Abu Dhabi Future Energy Company moved to create the first commercial CCS facility in the iron and steel industry. CO_{2} is a byproduct of the iron making process. It is transported via a 50 km pipeline to Abu Dhabi National Oil Company oil reserves for EOR. The facility's capacity is 800,000 tonnes per year. As of 2013, more than 40% of gas emitted by the crude oil production process is recovered within the oil fields for EOR.

== United Kingdom ==
The government aims to capture and store 20-30 Mtpa by 2030, and over 50 Mtpa by 2035 (for comparison greenhouse gas emissions by the United Kingdom were 425 Mt in 2021). The 2020 budget allocated 800 million pounds to attempt to create CCS clusters by 2030, to capture CO_{2} from heavy industry and a gas-fired power station and store it under the North Sea. The Crown Estate is responsible for storage rights on the UK continental shelf and it has facilitated work on offshore CO_{2} storage technical and commercial issues, and the North Sea Transition Authority has awarded 6 undersea storage licences including to BP and Equinor.

A trial of bio-energy with carbon capture and storage (BECCS) at a wood-fired unit in Drax power station in the UK started in 2019. If successful this could remove one tonne per day of CO_{2} from the atmosphere, and the company aims for operations to start in 2027.

In the UK CCS is under consideration to help with industry and heating decarbonization, and it is hoped that building small modular units to fit to existing factories will lower the cost below the carbon price on the UK Emissions Trading Scheme, which was around 80 GBP per tonne in early 2022. Direct air capture is also still being considered, but as of 2022 is much too expensive.

In May 2022, it was announced that Nuada (formerly MOF Technologies) had partnered with HeidelbergCement, Buzzi Unicem and Cementir Holding to build a point source carbon capture plant to further hard to abate industry decarbonization

== United States ==
In August 2026, CF Industries, JERA and Mitsui broke ground on Blue Point One, a low-carbon ammonia plant in Modeste, Louisiana. The plant is expected to produce 1.4 million metric tons of ammonia per year when complete.In addition to individual carbon capture and sequestration projects, various programs work to research, develop, and deploy CCS technologies on a broad scale. These include the National Energy Technology Laboratory's (NETL) Carbon Sequestration Program, regional carbon sequestration partnerships and the Carbon Sequestration Leadership Forum (CSLF).

In September 2020, the U.S. Department Of Energy awarded $72 million in federal funding to support the development and advancement of carbon capture technologies. Under this cost-shared program, DOE awarded $51 million to nine new projects for coal and natural gas power and industrial sources.

The nine projects were to design initial engineering studies to develop technologies for byproducts at industrial sites. The projects selected are:

- Enabling Production of Low Carbon Emissions Steel Through CO_{2} Capture from Blast Furnace Gases — ArcelorMittal USA
- LH CO2MENT Colorado Project — Electricore
- Engineering Design of a Polaris Membrane CO_{2} Capture System at a Cement Plant — Membrane Technology and Research (MTR) Inc.
- Engineering Design of a Linde-BASF Advanced Post-Combustion CO_{2} Capture Technology at a Linde Steam Methane Reforming H_{2} Plant — Praxair
- Initial Engineering and Design for CO_{2} Capture from Ethanol Facilities — University of North Dakota Energy & Environmental Research Center
- Chevron Natural Gas Carbon Capture Technology Testing Project — Chevron USA, Inc.
- Engineering-scale Demonstration of Transformational Solvent on NGCC Flue Gas — ION Clean Energy Inc.
- Engineering-Scale Test of a Water-Lean Solvent for Post-Combustion Capture — Electric Power Research Institute Inc.
- Engineering Scale Design and Testing of Transformational Membrane Technology for CO_{2} Capture — Gas Technology Institute (GTI)

The International Energy Agency reported growth in direct air capture global operating capacity.

$21 million was also awarded to 18 projects for technologies that remove CO_{2} from the atmosphere. The focus was on the development of new materials for use in direct air capture and will also complete field testing. The projects:

- Direct Air Capture Using Novel Structured Adsorbents — Electricore
- Advanced Integrated Reticular Sorbent-Coated System to Capture CO_{2} from the Atmosphere — GE Research
- MIL-101(Cr)-Amine Sorbents Evaluation Under Realistic Direct Air Capture Conditions — Georgia Tech Research Corporation
- Demonstration of a Continuous-Motion Direct Air Capture System — Global Thermostat Operations, LLC
- Experimental Demonstration of Alkalinity Concentration Swing for Direct Air Capture of CO_{2} — Harvard University
- High-Performance, Hybrid Polymer Membrane for CO_{2} Separation from Ambient Air — InnoSense, LLC
- Transformational Sorbent Materials for a Substantial Reduction in the Energy Requirement for Direct Air Capture of CO_{2} — InnoSepra, LLC
- A Combined Water and CO_{2} Direct Air Capture System — IWVC, LLC
- TRAPS: Tunable, Rapid-uptake, AminoPolymer Aerogel Sorbent for Direct Air Capture of CO_{2} — Palo Alto Research Center
- Direct Air Capture Using Trapped Small Amines in Hierarchical Nanoporous Capsules on Porous Electrospun Hollow Fibers — Rensselaer Polytechnic Institute
- Development of Advanced Solid Sorbents for Direct Air Capture — RTI International
- Direct Air Capture Recovery of Energy for CCUS Partnership (DAC RECO2UP) — Southern States Energy Board
- Membrane Adsorbents Comprising Self-Assembled Inorganic Nanocages (SINCs) for Super-fast Direct Air Capture Enabled by Passive Cooling — SUNY
- Low Regeneration Temperature Sorbents for Direct Air Capture of CO_{2} — Susteon Inc.
- Next Generation Fiber-Encapsulated Nanoscale Hybrid Materials for Direct Air Capture with Selective Water Rejection — The Trustees of Columbia University in the City of New York
- Gradient Amine Sorbents for Low Vacuum Swing CO_{2} Capture at Ambient Temperature — The University of Akron
- Electrochemically-Driven CO_{2} Separation — University of Delaware
- Development of Novel Materials for Direct Air Capture of CO_{2} — University of Kentucky Research Foundation

=== Kemper Project, MS 2010-2021 ===
The Kemper Project is a gas-fired power plant under construction in Kemper County, Mississippi. It was originally planned as a coal-fired plant. Mississippi Power, a subsidiary of Southern Company, began construction in 2010. Had it become operational as a coal plant, the Kemper Project would have been a first-of-its-kind electricity plant to employ gasification and carbon capture technologies at this scale. The emission target was to reduce CO_{2} to the same level an equivalent natural gas plant would produce. However, in June 2017 the proponents – Southern Company and Mississippi Power – announced that the plant would only burn natural gas.

Construction was delayed and the scheduled opening was pushed back over two years, while the cost increased to $6.6 billion—three times the original estimate. According to a Sierra Club analysis, Kemper is the most expensive power plant ever built for the watts of electricity it will generate.

In October 2021, the coal gasification portion of the plant was demolished.

=== Terrell Natural Gas Processing Plant ===
Opening in 1972, the Terrell plant in Texas, United States was the oldest operating industrial CCS project as of 2017. CO_{2} is captured during gas processing and transported primarily via the Val Verde pipeline where it is eventually injected at Sharon Ridge oil field and other secondary sinks for use in EOR. The facility captures an average of somewhere between 0.4 and 0.5 million tons of CO_{2} per annum.

=== Enid Fertilizer ===
Beginning in 1982, the facility owned by the Koch Nitrogen company is the second oldest large scale CCS facility still in operation. The CO_{2} that is captured is a high purity byproduct of nitrogen fertilizer production. The process is made economical by transporting the CO_{2} to oil fields for EOR.

=== Shute Creek Gas Processing Facility ===
7 million metric tonnes of CO_{2} are recovered annually from ExxonMobil's Shute Creek gas processing plant near La Barge, Wyoming, and transported by pipeline to various oil fields for EOR. Started in 1986, as of 2017 this project had the second largest CO_{2} capture capacity in the world.

=== Petra Nova (2017-2020) ===
The Petra Nova project is a billion dollar endeavor undertaken by NRG Energy and JX Nippon to partially retrofit their jointly owned W.A Parish coal-fired power plant with post-combustion carbon capture. The plant, which is located in Thompsons, Texas (just outside of Houston), entered commercial service in 1977. Carbon capture began on 10 January 2017. The WA Parish unit 8 generates 240 MW and 90% of the CO_{2} (or 1.4 million tonnes) was captured per year. The CO_{2} (99% purity) is compressed and piped about 82 miles to West Ranch Oil Field, Texas, for EOR. The field has a capacity of 60 million barrels of oil and has increased its production from 300 barrels per day to 4000 barrels daily. On 1 May 2020, NRG shut down Petra Nova, citing low oil prices during the COVID-19 pandemic. The plant had also reportedly suffered frequent outages and missed its carbon sequestration goal by 17% over its first three years of operation. In 2021 the plant was mothballed.

=== Illinois Industrial, Decatur IL ===
As of 2018 the Illinois Industrial Carbon Capture and Storage project in Decatur, Illinois is dedicated to geological CO_{2} storage. The public-private research project spearheaded by Archer Daniels Midland Co received a 171 million dollar investment from the DOE and over 66 million dollars from the private sector. The CO_{2} is a byproduct of the fermentation process of corn ethanol production and is stored 7000 feet underground in the Mt. Simon Sandstone saline aquifer. Sequestration began in April 2017 with a carbon capture capacity of 1 Mt/a.

=== NET Power Demonstration Facility, La Porte TX ===
As of 2019, the NET Power Demonstration Facility in La Porte, TX was an oxy-combustion natural gas power plant that operated by the Allam power cycle. The plant was able to reduce its air emissions to zero by producing a near pure stream of CO_{2}. and first fired in May 2018.

=== Century Plant, TX ===
As of 2014, Occidental Petroleum, along with SandRidge Energy, operated a West Texas hydrocarbon gas processing plant and related pipeline infrastructure that provides CO_{2} for Enhanced Oil Recovery (EOR). With a CO_{2} capture capacity of 8.4 Mt/a, the Century plant was the largest single industrial source CO_{2} capture facility in the world.

== Developing projects by several countries ==
=== ANICA - Advanced Indirectly Heated Carbonate Looping Process ===
The ANICA Project focused on developing economically feasible carbon capture technology for lime and cement plants, which are responsible for 8% of the total anthropogenic carbon dioxide emissions. In 2019, a consortium of 12 partners from Germany, United Kingdom and Greece began working on integrating indirectly heated carbonate lopping (IHCaL) process in cement and lime production. The project aimed at lowering the energy penalty and CO_{2} avoidance costs for CO_{2} capture from lime and cement plants.

=== Port of Rotterdam CCUS Backbone Initiative ===
Expected in 2021, the Port of Rotterdam CCUS Backbone Initiative aimed to implement a "backbone" of shared CCS infrastructure for use by businesses located around the Port of Rotterdam in Rotterdam, Netherlands. The project is overseen by the Port of Rotterdam, natural gas company Gasunie, and the EBN. It intends to capture and sequester 2 million tons of CO_{2} per year and increase this number in future years. Although dependent on the participation of companies, the goal of this project is to greatly reduce the carbon footprint of the industrial sector of the Port of Rotterdam and establish a successful CCS infrastructure in the Netherlands following the recently canceled ROAD project. CO_{2} captured from local chemical plants and refineries will both be sequestered in the North Sea seabed. The possibility of a CCU initiative has also been considered, in which the captured CO_{2} will be sold to horticultural firms, who will use it to speed up plant growth, as well as other industrial users.

=== Climeworks Direct Air Capture Plant and CarbFix2 Project ===
Climeworks opened the first commercial direct air capture plant in Zürich, Switzerland in 2008. Their process captures CO_{2} from ambient air using a patented filter, isolates the CO_{2} at high heat, and transports it to a nearby greenhouse as a fertilizer. The plant is built near a waste recovery facility that provides excess heat to power the plant.

Climeworks is also working with Reykjavik Energy on the CarbFix2 project with EU funding. This project, called "Orca," is located in Hellisheidi, Iceland. It uses direct air capture technology in conjunction with a large geothermal power plant. Once CO_{2} is captured using Climeworks' filters, it is heated using heat from the geothermal plant and used to carbonate water. The geothermal plant then pumps the carbonated water into underground rock formations where the CO_{2} reacts with basaltic bedrock and forms carbonate minerals for permanent storage.

=== OPEN100 ===
The OPEN100 project, launched in 2020 by the Energy Impact Center (EIC), is the world's first open-source blueprint for nuclear power plant deployment. The Energy Impact Center and OPEN100 aim to reverse climate change by 2040 and believe that nuclear power is the only feasible energy source to power CCS without the compromise of releasing new CO_{2}.

This project intends to bring together researchers, designers, scientists, engineers, think tanks, etc. to help compile research and designs that will eventually evolve into a blueprint that is available to the public and can be utilized in the development of future nuclear plants.

=== Nuada ===
MOF Technologies have developed Nuada, a modular point source carbon capture technology, which uses metal-organic frameworks (MOFs) to deliver energy-efficient CO_{2} removal at a fraction of the cost of conventional amines. After having been selected by the Global Cement and Concrete Association via their Innovandi Open Challenge, Nuada will partner with HeidelbergCement, Buzzi Unicem and Cementir Holding to build pilot plants in 2022.
