= Carbon capture and storage in Mexico =

Mexico highly depends on the burning of its fossil fuels, and for the same reason, it is in its interest to look into mitigation solutions for its corresponding emissions. In the General Law on Climate Change on 2012, Mexico promised to reduce 20% of its greenhouse gas (GHG) emissions by 2020 and 50% by 2050, as well as in the Paris Agreement. 19% of this new mitigation plan will be dedicated to carbon capture and storage and specifically 10% to the energy industry.

== Emissions ==
Mexico produces many carbon dioxide emissions due to burning hydrocarbons. It was found that Mexico contributed to 1.67% of Earth's global emission, holding the 11th place as the most polluted country. Out of the 483 million tons of CO_{2} emitted in 2010, 258 million tons correspond to stationary sources.

The main source of greenhouse gas emission in the country is from the consumption and treatment of fossil fuels. Consumption and treatment of fossil fuels are held responsible for 60% of the overall GHG emissions, 75% of them being CO_{2}. The activities that mainly contribute to the emission of greenhouse gasses are the generation of electricity, petroleum and natural gas, cement production, and metallurgy. In 2010, 407.3 megatonnes of CO_{2} were emitted only from energy consumption.

Also, each state is held accountable for their emission rate according to the industry and activities that take place in their region. Coahuila, emitted about 24 millions of tons, being the most pollutant state in the country. It is due to its electricity generating carbon plants and several iron and steel plants as well. Tamaulipas comes next in second place, generating about 19 million tons, followed by Campeche and Veracruz, that emitted 15.5 millions of tons of CO_{2} each. These last 3 cities, are the most feasible for CCS practices, given that they are in areas of exploitable petroleum, good for EOS.

== Sequestration ==
There are four main types of sequestration: in deep saline aquifers, to fill up the hole where oil used to prevail, to replace underground methane with CO_{2}, and to use enhanced oil recovery (EOR) technology. Also, for sequestration to be plausible, reservoirs must be porous, permeable and deep. In Mexico, some areas meet these requirements and are ready for sequestering CO_{2}.

PEMEX, being the Mexican oil monopoly, is interested in obtaining as much oil as much as possible, which is why there has been previous and current investment in EOR. Along with Halliburton, a plant in El Carmito has been capturing carbon and sequestering underground to enhance its oil. It is estimated that since it started, it has been able to sequester 8,459,550 tons of CO_{2}, representing a large number of barrels. On the other hand, in the year 2000 it started this practice in Campo Artesa, located in the Five Presidents Area (Area de Activo Cinco Presidentes), where it has 4 wells of production. Also, in 2005, PEMEX invested in Campo Sitio Grande, which along with Campo Artesa, it is estimated to have recovered 950 million of oil barrels through EOR. In the same area, Activo Cinco Presidentes, there is Campo Ogarrio, which is a pilot project title "Complejo Petroquímico de Cosoleacaque" to inject CO_{2} underground in the area known as "Activo Integral Aceite Terciario del Golfo". This is all located around the Gulf of Mexico, which contains promising amounts of crude oil.

The "Activo Integral Aceite Terciario del Golfo", is a pilot project that PEMEX, along with other companies have been designing to generate electricity with an emission-free idea. It has been under research on CCS feasibility, as well as possible applications and a financing plan. It started in 2012, where the CO_{2} has been captured under a 2 MW electric plant.

The main areas that have been under investigation for sequestration are around the southwest, but some have already been dismissed. 3 of them, are around Sonora and Oaxaca, which at first it was thought to be feasible to serve the iron and steel industry: these being Fuentes (Río Escondido), Terciaria del Golfo, and Sabinas Monclova. The last two, have been proven not to be economically viable because of its rocky body and discontinuity due to tectonic movement. Also, the entire west, specially around the Pacific and central part of Mexico, is not convenient for sequestration because of the high seismic and volcano activity and the fractures that already exist, may allow leakage.

On the other hand, the some part of the republic is very promising for deep saline aquifer sequestration, since it was found that a large area is more than 800m deep. The 11 most promising states are:

- Baja California
- Sonora-Sinaloa
- Chihuahua
- Coahuila
- Central Mexico
- Burgos
- Tampico-Misantla
- Veracruz
- Southeast Mexico
- Yucatán
- Chiapas

The last six are ideal to store the total emissions due to the area's electrical industry. Altogether, it was calculated that around 100 gigatons of CO_{2} are capable of storage, so if the energy sector were kept constant, there would be enough room for the next 500 years.

== Projects in operation ==
Currently, since Mexico's Paris Agreement, the country has been working on CCUS Technology Roadmap or "Mapa de la Ruta Tecnológica para CCS". The government, PEMEX and Mario Molina Center have been involved in this project. It started in 2014 and is foreseen to launch in 2024, it currently is in the research and administrative stage. Its main research has been around the area of "Cinco Presidentes" and other sequestration locations. The technology foreseen for capturing carbon is of post combustion that consists in capturing the gases resulting from energy and heat, then separating CO_{2} from that flue gas compressing it and transporting it through ducts and pipes for further sequestration. The project has been financed by the Secretariat of Finance and Public Credit but also received international donations from countries and organizations such as the World Bank.

Mexico has also been part of other projects in the past and associated with other organizations in the sector, including Global CCS Institute. Also, main governmental collaborators for these projects are PEMEX, Secretaría de Energía (SENER), Comisión Federal de Electricidad (CFE), Secretariat of Environment and Natural Resources (SEMARNAT) as well as the National Institute of Nuclear Research, where the principal research is taking place. The nation has participated in Carbon Sequestration Leadership Forum (CSLF), CEM (grupo de acción sobre capture y uso y almacenamiento de carbon de la cumber ministerial de energia limpia), as well as collaborating with the US and Canada in other forums.
