= NZT (disambiguation) =

NZT may refer to:

- New Zealand Time, the time zone for New Zealand
- NZT-48 (aka NZT), a fictional mind-expanding drug from the Limitless franchise
- Nikola NZT, a proposed electric off-road powersport side-by-side vehicle
- NZT, an assembly language command for the Signetics 8X300
- NZT (Toyota), a model code; see List of Toyota model codes
- Nazareth station (rail code: NZT), Nazareth, Tamil Nadu, India; see List of railway stations in India
- Nacionalinės žemės tarnybos (NŽT; National Land Service), the Lithuanian national mapping agency
- Net Zero Teesside, England, planned power station with CO₂ capture and storage
