= FutureCoal =

UK-based Pro-coal lobbying organization

FutureCoal is an international non-profit, non-governmental association based in London, United Kingdom. It was created to represent the global coal industry. The association was formerly called the World Coal Association (WCA) until 2023 and the World Coal Institute (WCI) until 2010. FutureCoal undertakes lobbying, organises workshops, and provides coal information to decision makers in international energy and environmental policy and research discussions, as well as supplying information to the general public and educational organisations on the benefits and issues surrounding the use of coal. It also promotes clean coal technologies.

It has participated in a number of United Nations and International Energy Agency (IEA) workshops, boards, and forums, including the UN Commission on Sustainable Development, the UN Framework Convention on Climate Change, the IEA Working Party on Fossil Fuels, and the IEA Coal Industry Advisory Board. It is also part of the Carbon Sequestration Leadership Forum.

It is co-author of a report on the future of coal in ASEAN nations.

In 2019, the WCA appointed a new CEO, Michelle Manook who previously worked in mining services firm Orica.

In November 2023, the WCA rebranded to "FutureCoal: The Global Alliance for Sustainable Coal".

== See also ==
- Carbon capture and storage
- Clean coal
- Coal lobby
- Coal mining
- Coal-mining region
