= Greensand (disambiguation) =

Greensand, or green sand, is a sand or sandstone which has a greenish color.

Greensand or green sand may also refer to:

== Places ==
=== England ===
- Greensand Ridge, an escarpment
- Greensand Ridge Walk, a long-distance path
- Greensand Way, a long-distance path

=== United States ===
- Greensand, New Jersey, an unincorporated community
- Green Sand Beach or Papakolea Beach, Hawaiʻi

== Other uses ==
- Green sand (casting), slightly damp sand, used in sand casting of metals
- Olivine sand, which can form green sand beaches
- Project Greensand aims to store captured CO_{2} on the ocean floor of Denmark's North Sea region

== See also ==
- Lower Greensand Group, a geological unit in southeast England
