= Whitetail Clean Energy =

Proposed power station in Wilton, Redcar and Cleveland, England

- Country: England
- Location: Wilton, Redcar and Cleveland
- Coordinates: 54.575°N 1.127°W
- Status: Proposed
- Employees: 200 (projected)

Power generation
- Nameplate capacity: 300 MW

External links
- Website: official website

The Whitetail Clean Energy is a proposed power station in Wilton, Redcar and Cleveland, England. The generating process of the plant is listed as a "clean energy source", using natural gas and oxygen in an Allam-Fetvedt Cycle to create power. The excess carbon dioxide (CO_{2}) not used by the co-generation process is intended to be captured and stored under the North Sea, making the plant the first in the United Kingdom to utilise this type of technology, and also use carbon sequestration under the North Sea. The plant is also included in the Net Zero Teesside project.

== Proposal ==
The power station, which is a joint venture between 8 Rivers Capital and Sembcorp (UK), is expected to create 2,000 jobs in the building process, with a further 200 to run the plant on a day-to-day basis. The plant would combust pure oxygen with natural gas, using a high pressure carbon dioxide (CO_{2}) stream (supercritical carbon dioxide), rather than steam to rotate a turbine, which would generate the electricity. The CO_{2} stream would then be fed through a heat exchanger and then cooled. Excess CO_{2} of around 800,000 tons per year would be captured and stored under the North Sea.

Allam-Fetvedt Cycle diagram Not all parts of the process are shown

Whilst the Allam-Fetvedt Cycle was not successfully tested until 2018, the UK government had been supporting a zero CO_{2} project on Teesside since 2012. The plant was described as being the United Kingdom's first "net zero" power station, and the first to use the carbon capture and storage technology. Whilst the power generation process does not emit any CO_{2}, it does produce it in the closed loop system. The excess gas is intended to be stored but can also be utilised for other purposes. The power plant would be located within the Teesside Freeport Zone. 8 Rivers Capital stated that it had completed a pre-FEED (front end engineering design) study in early 2021, which was partly funded by the UK Department for Business, Energy & Industrial Strategy.

Although originally aiming at a completion date in 2025 the project has yet to break ground as of 2026. The project depends on the carbon capture and pipeline project called the East Coast Cluster which began construction in mid-2025 with an expected startup date of 2028.

The UK government Minister of State for Business, Energy and Clean Growth, Anne-Marie Trevelyan, stated that the project was a "..real game-changer [and would] revitalise this key industrial heartland." The labour MP for Stockton North, Alex Cunningham, described the announcement as "great news", but wanted assurances that jobs at the plant would go to local people. The plant will also be part of the Net Zero Teesside project, which plans to be the first decarbonised industrial cluster in the world. This project aims to enable the heavy industry on Teesside somewhere to store the carbon produced during their processes, rather than emitting them into the atmosphere.

== See also ==
- Allam power cycle
