= ZCH =

ZCH may refer to:

- Central Hongshuihe Zhuang, one of the Zhuang languages of the Guangxi region of China (ISO 639-3 code: zch)
- Agrarian Union (Poland) (Związek Chłopski, ZCh), a 1920s political party
- Choszczno County, north-west Poland, vehicle registration code; see Vehicle registration plates of Poland
- Zero Carbon Humber, England, a planned carbon capture scheme; see Carbon storage in the North Sea § Zero Carbon Humber
