= Veren (company) =

Canadian oil and gas company

Veren Inc.
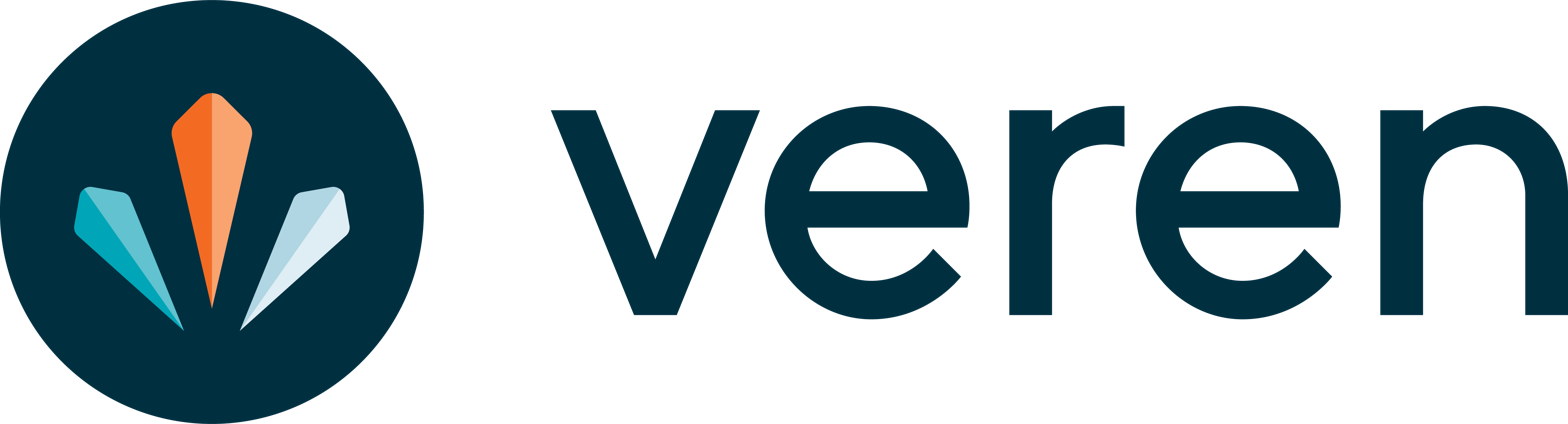
- Company type: Public company
- Traded as: TSX: VRN; NYSE: VRN
- Industry: Oil and gas industry
- Founded: 2001 as Crescent Point Energy Ltd.
- Defunct: 12 May 2025
- Fate: Acquired by Whitecap Resources
- Headquarters: Calgary, Alberta, Canada
- Key people: Craig Bryksa, President and CEO; Barbara Munroe, Chair of the Board
- Products: Light Oil; Natural gas
- Revenue: CAD$3.8 billion (2023)
- Website: www.vrn.com

Veren Inc. (formerly Crescent Point Energy) was an oil and gas exploration and production company based in Calgary, Alberta, Canada. The company focused primarily on light oil production in southern Saskatchewan and central Alberta. The company was founded in 2001, and was one of the largest independent oil and gas producers in Canada, having a significant presence in the Western Canadian Sedimentary Basin.

In 2025, the company was acquired by Whitecap Resources.

== History ==
In 2001, Crescent Point Energy began trading on the TSX Venture Exchange as a junior exploration and production company. It joined the Toronto Stock Exchange the following year. The company's name was derived from a road leading to a summer cabin in Thunder Bay, Ontario, owned by the grandfather of president and CEO Scott Saxberg.

In 2003, it merged with Tappit Resources. As part of the merger, the company converted to an income trust. In February 2007, it acquired Mission Oil and Gas for $628 million. In 2009, Crescent Point converted back to a normal corporation from an income trust.

In 2010, Crescent Point acquired properties in the Lower Shaunavon resource play in southwest Saskatchewan from Penn West Energy Trust.

In May 2015, Crescent Point acquired Legacy Oil and Gas for $1.5 billion.

On May 29 2018, Crescent Point announced that Scott Saxberg would be leaving the company after 17 years, with Craig Bryksa taking over duties as president and CEO on an interim basis. On September 5, 2018, Crescent Point confirmed Craig Bryksa as its new president and CEO. Robert (Bob) Heinemann also replaced Peter Bannister as chairman on Crescent Point's board of directors. Barbara Munroe was appointed as board chair following Bob Heinemann's retirement in October 2019.

On February 17, 2021, Crescent Point announced strategic entry into the Kaybob Duvernay play by acquiring 30,000 boe/d of production for $900 million from Shell Canada Energy. In March 2023, Crescent Point acquired Spartan Delta's oil and gas assets in the Alberta Montney, for $1.7 billion. In November 2023, the company further expanded into the Alberta Montney by acquiring Hammerhead Energy Inc. for $2.55 billion.

In March 2024, the company announced that it would rebrand as Veren; the name change was considered a reflection of changes in the company's operations since Bryksa took over as CEO.

In March 2025, Whitecap Resources announced its intent to acquire Veren. The acquisition was completed on May 12, 2025.

== Assets and holdings ==
Veren produces over 190,000 boe/day. Veren mainly produces light and medium oil, as opposed to heavy oil or natural gas. Most of the company's oil production is from central Alberta and southern Saskatchewan; notable fields in these areas include the Kaybob Duvernay, Alberta Montney, Viewfield Bakken, and Shaunavon.
