= Quest Carbon Capture and Storage Project =

The Quest Carbon Capture and Storage Project captures one million tonnes of CO_{2} emissions per year and stores it in underground geologic formations. The capture unit is located at the Scotford Upgrader in Alberta, Canada. The unit captures carbon dioxide produced from steam methane reformation to produce hydrogen that is used to upgrade bitumen from oil sands into synthetic crude oil. Between 2015 and 2019, the facility captured 5 megatonnes out of the 7.5 megatonnes produced by the steam methane reformer for an average CO_{2} capture efficiency of 67%. Carbon dioxide is only captured from the steam methane reformer at the Scotford Upgrader. Other sources of emissions at the facility are unabated.

== Technology ==
Mined bitumen extracted from Alberta's oil sands is a heavy oil that needs an upgrading process before being delivered to refineries and transformed into marketable products. The upgrading process is energy intensive and requires hydrogen that is produced from a steam methane reformer. Making hydrogen creates carbon dioxide that at Quest is captured and separated from nitrogen through an absorption amine technology process. Captured CO_{2} is subsequently compressed into a supercritical fluid, then transported via pipeline for 64 km where CO_{2} is stored two kilometers underground into a saline aquifer.

== Current status ==
The project began capturing CO_{2} on August 23, 2015. Quest Carbon Capture and Storage Project at Scotford has the capacity to capture approximately one-third of the CO_{2} emissions from the Scotford Upgrader. The cumulative stored volume is expected to be greater than 27 million tonnes of CO_{2} over the anticipated 25 year life of the Scotford Upgrader.

The most recent report to the Government of Alberta was released in 2023. In that year, the facility injected 1,003 kilotonnes of CO_{2} into three reservoirs and reported an average CO_{2} capture efficiency ratio 75.2%.

== Carbon credit scandal ==
Between 2015 and 2021 the Quest facility received two carbon credits for each credit earned. This subsidy from the Alberta government was phased out in 2022.

== See also ==
- Korea Carbon Capture & Sequestration R&D Center
- Gorgon Carbon Dioxide Injection Project
