= Carbon dioxide flooding =

Process to increase the output of oil

Carbon dioxide (CO_{2}) flooding is a process in which carbon dioxide is injected into an oil reservoir to increase the output when extracting oil. This is most often used in reservoirs where production rates have declined due to depletion.

== Overview ==
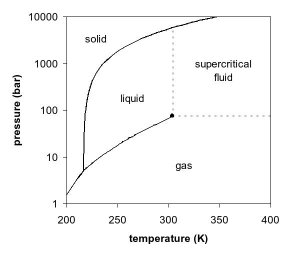
Carbon dioxide pressure-temperature phase diagram

When the amount of recoverable oil in an oil reservoir is depleted through primary and secondary production, around 60 to 70% of oil that was originally in the reservoir may still remain. In some cases, carbon dioxide (CO_{2}) flooding may be an ideal tertiary recovery method to recover more of the recoverable oil than could be produced using secondary oil recovery methods.

Because of its special properties, CO_{2} improves oil recovery by lowering interfacial tension, swelling the oil, reducing viscosity of the oil, and by mobilizing the lighter components of the oil. When the injected CO_{2} and residual oil are miscible, the physical forces holding the two fluids apart effectively disappears. This results in a viscosity reduction of the hydrocarbon and makes it easier to displace the crude oil from the rock pores and sweep it to the production well.

In other cases where the CO_{2} and residual oil are immiscible, the injected CO_{2} may still be used to drive the crude oil through the formation to be produced. One reason this occurs is because the injected CO_{2} can flow into the minute pores that are unavailable to oil and water.

== Process ==
As an oil field matures and production rates decline, there is a growing incentive to intervene and attempt to increase oil output utilizing tertiary recovery techniques (also termed improved or enhanced oil recovery). Petroleum engineers assess available options for increasing reservoir productivity. The options include chemical flooding, thermal/steam injection, and CO_{2} injection.

One of the criteria for determining if CO_{2} flooding is a candidate for the recovery of oil from the formation is the pressure of the formation. The miscibility of the CO_{2} and the crude oil is dependent upon the pressure and the temperature. However, since it is difficult to change the temperature of the reservoir, the pressure of the reservoir may be adjusted, to an extent, to bring the reservoir to a pressure that keeps the CO_{2} in a supercritical state. If a miscible flood is found to be feasible, the pressure is kept above the minimum miscibility pressure (MMP). The pressure may be below the MMP if an immiscible flood is desired.

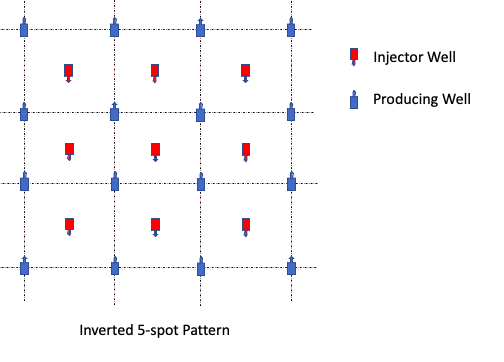
Inverted 5-spot Pattern

A petroleum engineer will then determine a method of using CO_{2} flooding to recover petroleum from the reservoir. This may be a continuous injection method, a water alternating gas (WAG) method, or some combination. The amount, or amounts of CO_{2} will be determined by the amount of the pore volume of the formation that is filled with oil. This is known as the hydrocarbon pore volume (HCPV). The petroleum engineer will also decide if the flood will be a pattern flood or a line drive flood. In a pattern flood, CO_{2} is usually injected into a number of injection wells surrounding a producing well. Alternatively, CO_{2} may be injected into injector wells surrounded by producing wells. This is called an inverted pattern. In a line drive, the injection wells are located in a straight line parallel to the production wells.

Optimally, a slug of CO_{2} will mobilize a flood front where the mixture of oil and CO_{2} will mobilize more oil. This flood front will radiate from each injection well towards the surrounding producing wells where the oil will be produced. The formation of a front is dependent upon the rate that the CO_{2} is injected, how fast it mobilizes the oil, and the porosity of the formation. Injecting the CO_{2} too fast will allow the CO_{2} to channel from the injector directly to a producing well without mobilizing any oil. Injecting CO_{2} too quickly may fracture the formation, which may again allow channeling from the injector to any or all of the producing wells. Also, injecting CO_{2} may migrate fines, which are small particles of clay and minerals, may plug the pores and prevent the mobilization of oil through the formation.

In a continuous flood, a slug of CO_{2} will be continuously injected and not followed by any other fluid. The amount of CO_{2} is usually calculated to be around 100% of the HCPV of the field or pattern. In a water alternating gas (WAG) process, slugs of CO_{2} are followed by slugs of water. The overall amount of CO_{2} may be between 40% and 50% of the HCPV. The WAG process is known to reduce channeling of the CO_{2}.

== Formations and Oil ==
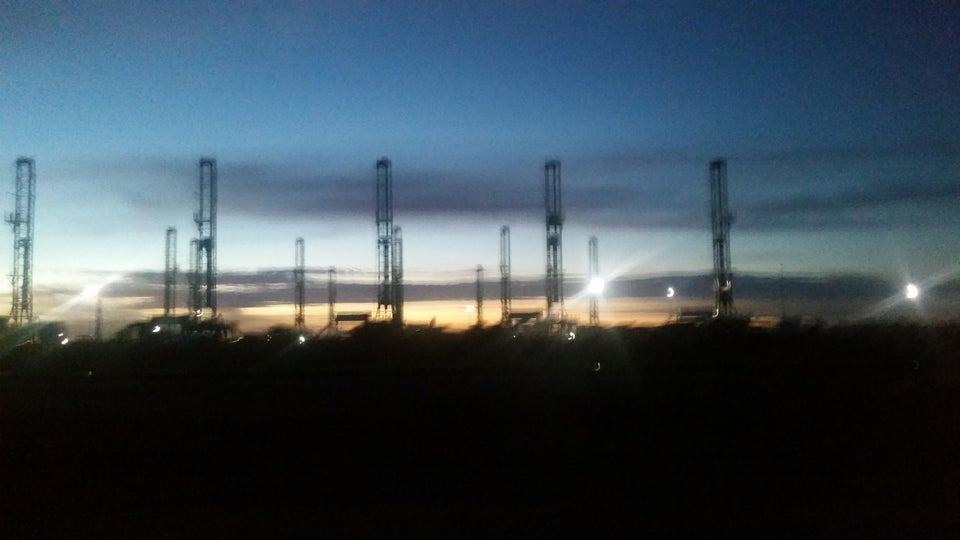
Drilling rigs in the Permian Basin, where much of the CO2 flooding occurs in the United States.

Sandstone and carbonate reservoirs (such as limestone or dolomite) are preferred for this method over reservoirs with ultra-low permeability such as shale due to the risk of CO_{2} channeling through hydraulic or natural fractures in the rock. CO_{2} flooding is still sometimes used in these instances, but usually using the "huff and puff" CO_{2} injection method, which allows the CO_{2} to soak in a reservoir after being pumped in through the injection well for a period of time before the production well is opened and put back into functionality. This method reduces the chances of unwanted channeling, and increases the amounts of oil that may be recovered as opposed to the more common CO_{2} injection water alternating gas process (WAG) or by following a soak of CO_{2} with steam.

Miscible CO_{2} flooding is a method preferred for medium to light oils due to the mobility ratio between the CO_{2} and the oil. The mobility ratio refers to the ratio of the mobility of the CO_{2} fluid injected into a reservoir for secondary or tertiary production versus the mobility of the oil. For medium or light oils with a high API gravity, fluids or gases that are less viscous themselves can be used. However, if an injection fluid or gas that had lower viscosity was used on a heavy crude oil or bitumen, the injection fluid or gas would bypass the oil and result in a poorly swept reservoir.

For reservoirs filled with extremely heavy oil or bitumen, steam injection, or other methods that employ heat, are much more commonly favored to reduce the oil's mobility or viscosity, thus easing extraction. Generally, reservoirs with lighter oils will have higher recovery percentages with primary and secondary recovery methods, but reservoirs with heavier oils or bitumen will have much lower recovery with primary and secondary recovery methods and the transition from secondary to tertiary methods will have to occur much earlier in the reservoir's lifespan.

== History ==
Using CO_{2} for enhanced oil recovery was first investigated and patented in 1952. In 1964, a field test was conducted at the Mead Strawn Field, which involved the injection of a large slug of CO_{2} (25% of the hydrocarbon pore volume or HCPV) followed by carbonated water at reservoir conditions. Results indicated that 53 to 82 percent more oil was produced by the CO_{2} flood than was produced by water in the best areas of the waterflood.

The process was first commercially attempted in 1977 in Scurry County, Texas. Since then, the process has become extensively used in the Permian basin region of the US and is now more recently is being pursued in many different states. It is now being more actively pursued in China and throughout the rest of the world.

== Environmental Impacts ==
In connection with greenhouse gas emissions and global warming, CO_{2} flooding is advertised to sequester CO_{2} underground and therefore offset CO_{2} emissions elsewhere. This and the fact that it can usually be applied in a wide range or geologic conditions makes it a very popular method to recover residual oil, however, there are several drawbacks to the method. For one, because the gas alone has very low viscosity, there is very little control over it and this causes the possibility of it breaking through the producer well or fractures in the rock, and this is why the WAG technique is used. Another drawback is that this method has high gas requirements, and while most reservoirs attempt to use natural, locally sourced CO_{2}, sometimes this is not feasible and the CO_{2} must either be transported long distances using a pipeline, or made from artificial industrial sources such as natural gas processing. Of course, all methods of sourcing CO_{2} for CO_{2} flooding have the possibility for accidental release of CO_{2}, resulting in increased greenhouse gas emissions.

== See also ==
- Petroleum Industry
- Supercritical carbon dioxide
