= Valeriy Kostyuk =

Russian scientist (born 1940)

Valery Kostuk
- Вале́рий Ви́кторович Костю́к
- Born: 26 August 1940 (age 86); Zaporizhia, Ukrainian SSR
- Education: Chelyabinsk Polytechnic Institute
- Awards: Global Energy Prize (2012)
- Scientific career
- Fields: Cryogenics; Superconductors

Valery Viktorovich Kostuk (Russian: Вале́рий Ви́кторович Костю́к; born 26 August 1940 in Zaporizhia) is a Russian scientist who has contributed to the development of processes for producing gases and cryogenic liquids. He is a vice president of the Russian Academy of Sciences.

== Career ==
Kostuk graduated from the Chelyabinsk Polytechnic Institute in 1962 and then worked there as an engineer until 1963. From 1963 to 1978, he worked at the Moscow Aviation Institute, receiving a doctorate in 1976 and rising to the rank of professor. In the early 1990s, Kostuk founded the Low Temperature Research and Development Institute of the Moscow Aviation Institute and has served as the director of the Low Temperature Research and Development Institute since 1992.

In 1997, Kostuk became a full member of the Russian Academy of Sciences, and in 2013, one of its vice presidents. His research interests have included heat transfer, state changes and hydrodynamics of cryogenic fluids, as well as high-temperature superconducting machines and power transmission cables.

In 2012, along with Boris Katorgin and Rodney John Allam, Kostuk received the Global Energy Prize for his contributions to the development of processes and equipment for production of cryogenic liquids as well as technology for electricity production.
