= Rodney John Allam =

English chemical engineer

Rodney John Allam MBE
- Born: Rodney John Allam; 1940 (age 85–86); St Helens, Lancashire, England
- Engineering career
- Discipline: Chemical engineering
- Institutions: Institution of Chemical Engineers
- Employer(s): Air Products & Chemicals (formerly), 8 Rivers Capital (current)
- Projects: Allam power cycle
- Significant advance: Allam power cycle with integrated carbon dioxide capture

Rodney John Allam, MBE (born 1940 in St Helens, Lancashire) is an English chemical engineer and fellow of the Institution of Chemical Engineers who is credited with inventions related to power generation, notably the Allam power cycle, which is a generation process for fossil fuels, with integrated carbon dioxide capture.

== Career ==
Allam was employed by Air Products & Chemicals for 44 years, most recently as Director of Technology Development. In 2004, he was appointed member of the Order of the British Empire for services to the environment. He has also been a visiting professor at the Imperial College of Science and Technology and a lead author of the IPCC special report on carbon dioxide capture and storage, released in 2005. In 2007, the IPCC, along with Al Gore, was awarded with the Nobel Peace Prize.

His work has included new processes and equipment for production of gases and cryogenic liquids, such as oxygen, nitrogen, argon, carbon monoxide, carbon dioxide, hydrogen and helium. Several of these gases are generally produced through air separation, which is also a necessary step in the practical application of the Allam cycle, in which gaseous fossil fuels, for example natural gas or gasified coal, are combusted with pure oxygen. A 50 MW demonstration plant being built in Texas is expected to start operating in 2017.

In 2012, Allam was awarded the Global Energy Prize, for his work on processes and power generation, along with Russian scientists Valery Kostuk and Boris Katorgin. As of January 2017, he is chairman of the international award committee for the prize.

As of November 2016, Allam works for 8 Rivers Capital, with among other things the commercialisation of the Allam cycle.

== See also ==
- Allam power cycle
