= Boris Katorgin =

Russian scientist

- Борис Иванович Каторгин
- Born: 13 October 1934 (age 91); Solnechnogorsk
- Education: Bauman Moscow State Technical University
- Known for: RD-180 rocket engine
- Awards: Global Energy Prize (2012)
- Scientific career
- Fields: Rocket propulsion

Boris Ivanovich Katorgin (Russian: Борис Иванович Каторгин; born 13 October 1934 in Solnechnogorsk) is a Russian scientist who is known for his development of commercially successful rocket engine systems.

== Career ==
Katorgin graduated from the Bauman Moscow State Technical University in 1958 and became Doctor of Technology in 1983. He joined the NPO Energomash rocket engine manufacturer in 1958 and was its CEO and chief designer between 1991 and 2005. He has been a full member of the Russian Academy of Sciences since 2003.

Katorgin is mainly known for his work on cryogenic liquid-propellant rocket engines. He was the CEO and chief designer of NPO Energomash during the development of the RD-180 engine, which has been exported to the United States for driving Atlas III and Atlas V rockets. He was also involved in the development of the earlier and twice as powerful RD-170 engine. As of 2000, when the first RD-180-powered Atlas III rocket flew, the engine was considered to be 15 to 20 percent more fuel-efficient than competing designs. Katorgin has also contributed to the study of nuclear pulse propulsion, chemical lasers and superconducting systems for power transmission.

In 2012, along with Valery Kostuk and Rodney John Allam, Katorgin received the Global Energy Prize for his research and development relating to high-efficiency and reliable cryogenic-fuel-powered rocket propellant engines.
