= White Rose Project =

Coordinates: 53°44′32″N 0°59′32″W

The White Rose Carbon Capture and Storage project was a proposed oxy-fuel coal-fired power plant near the Drax power station in North Yorkshire, United Kingdom. It was proposed in 2012 by Capture Power Limited (in partnership with National Grid). This project would have been the first coal-fired power plant to demonstrate the use of oxy-fuel technology for low-carbon electricity at a competitive cost. The proposed 426 MW plant was expected to send 2 Mt CO_{2}/year to an offshore saline aquifer, achieving 90% capture. The Development Consent Order application submitted to the Department of Energy and Climate Change, now Department for Business, Energy and Industrial Strategy, was rejected in April 2016. The rejection was on the basis that the project had no route to funding, following the UK government cancelling a carbon capture and storage competition in November 2015.

== History ==
During the early 2010s, there was interest in the White Rose project taking part of the new governmental subsidies, most especially the CCS Commercialisation Programme and the EU New Entrant Reserve (NER) 300, both of which aimed at funding low-carbon energy projects to scale commercially. In 2014, the CCS Commercialisation Programme awarded the White Rose project with a 2-year Front End Engineering Design (FEED) Programme contract, which would finalize the engineering and financials of the project Also at this time, the White Rose project also received EUR 300 million from the European Commission. However, in November 2015, six months before the funding was supposed to be received, the UK government announced the end of the CCS commercialization Programme due to the UK Treasury’s concerns of high consumer costs and taxpayer money funding CCS before it reached its cost-efficiency. The Treasury cites the fact that no examples of the technology working after attempting to fund the idea in 2011 and in 2012. Unfortunately, since the cancellation, there have been no new updates from the White Rose project, even though the operation was expected to start in 2020.

== Industrial collaborations ==
Capture Power Limited is composed of three major European companies: Alstom, Drax Group, and The BOC Group. Due to reduced renewable energy subsidies from the UK government, Drax announced the withdrawal of its investments to begin after the Front End Engineering Design (FEED) studies were completed in 2015, but promised to continue providing land as well as site services and infrastructure. The BOC Group would be responsible for the delivery and maintenance of the air separation unit for the coal-fired power plant. Finally, National Grid would construct the carbon capture pipeline and storage facilities in a collaborate effort to provide infrastructure for surrounding carbon capture projects.
