= Whitecap Resources =

Canadian public oil and natural gas company founded in 2009

- Type: Public
- Traded as: TSX: WCP; S&P/TSX Composite Component
- Industry: Oil and gas
- Founded: 2009
- Headquarters: Calgary, Alberta, Canada
- Key people: Grant Fagerheim (President, CEO, and Chairman)
- Revenue: ▲CA$5.511 billion (2025)
- Net income: ▲CA$984.6 million (2025)
- Total assets: ▲CA$19.295 billion (2025)
- Total equity: ▲CA$11.002 billion (2025)
- Number of employees: 1,045
- Website: www.wcap.ca

Whitecap Resources is a Canadian public oil and natural gas company based in Calgary, Alberta, with operations in Western Canada. Its shares trade on the Toronto Stock Exchange under the symbol WCP. In 2025, the company reported average daily production of 307,245 boe/d.

== History ==
Whitecap Resources was founded in 2009. Its daily production grew rapidly in the following years, from 275 barrels of energy per day in 2009 to 14,052 in 2012. In 2012, it acquired Midway Energy, another Alberta light oil producer, for $550 million. In 2016, Whitecap bought some of Husky Energy's oil assets in Southwest Saskatchewan for $595 million.

In 2017, Brad Wall, then-premier of Saskatchewan, invited Whitecap to move to that province, citing lower taxes and subsidized relocation costs. The company said it would only move if it benefited shareholders.

In November 2017, Whitecap purchased a 62% interest in the Weyburn oil project in Saskatchewan for $940 million from Cenovus Energy. The deal was expected to increase Whitecap's oil production by 25%.

On March 10, 2025, Whitecap announced its intent to acquire Veren in a $15 billion transaction. The acquisition was completed on May 12, 2025.

== Operations ==
Whitecap Resources operates oil and natural gas assets in the Western Canadian Sedimentary Basin, with operations primarily in Alberta and Saskatchewan.

In its January 2026 corporate presentation, the company reported 2026 total production guidance of 370,000–375,000 boe/d.

Whitecap describes its Conventional Division as comprising four operating regions: Alberta Conventional, West Saskatchewan, East Saskatchewan and Weyburn.

== Carbon sequestration ==
Whitecap's Weyburn-Midale Carbon Dioxide Project transports carbon dioxide from industrial facilities in North Dakota to oilfields near Weyburn, Saskatchewan, for enhanced oil recovery and long-term storage.
