= NET Power Demonstration Facility =

Coordinates: 29.6476°N 95.0540°W

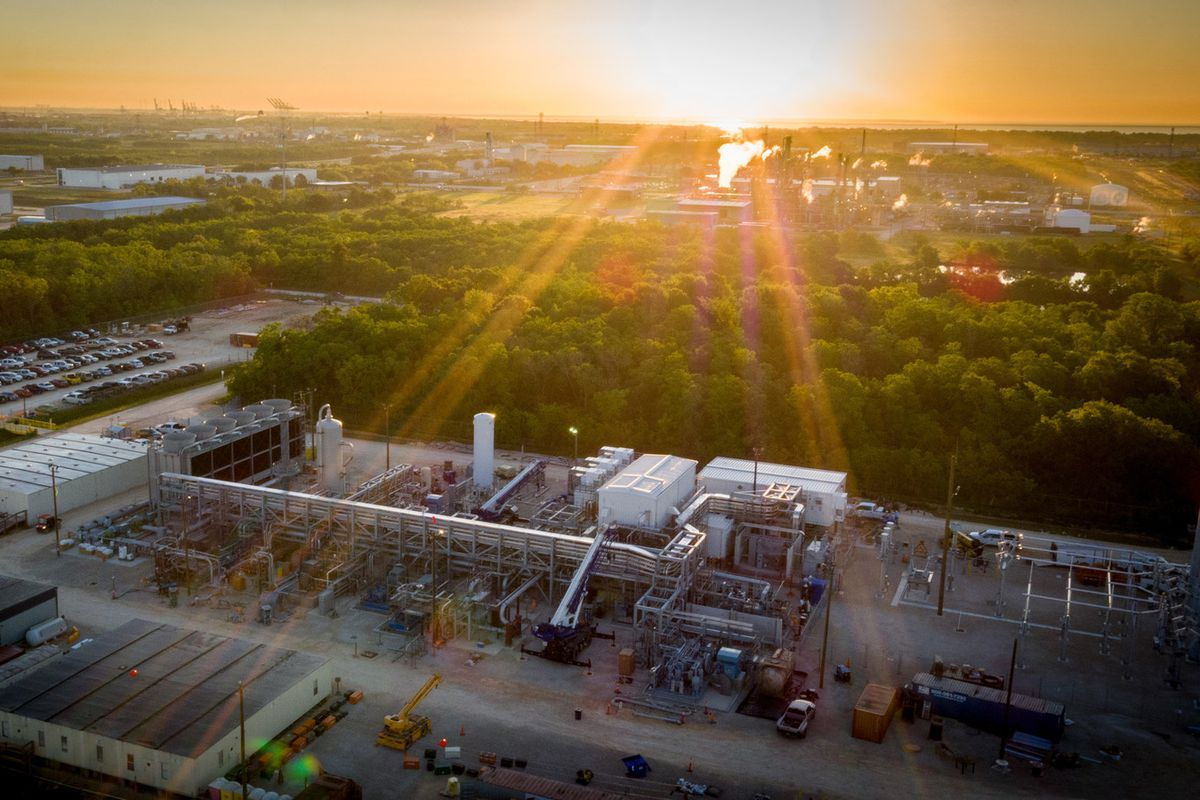
NET Power Plant. La Porte, Tx

The NET Power Test Facility, located in La Porte, Texas, is an oxy-combustion, zero-emissions 50 MWth natural gas power plant owned and operated by NET Power. NET Power is owned by Constellation Energy Corporation, Occidental Petroleum Corporation (Oxy) Low Carbon Ventures, Baker Hughes Company and 8 Rivers Capital, the company holding the patents for the technology. The plant is a first of its kind Allam-Fetvedt Cycle which achieved first-fire in May of 2018. The Allam-Fetvedt cycle delivers lower cost power while eliminating atmospheric emissions. The plant was featured in The Global CCS Institutes 2018 Status of CCS report. In recognition of the plant, NET Power was awarded the 2018 International Excellence in Energy Breakthrough Technological Project of the Year at the Abu Dhabi International Petroleum Exhibition and Conference (ADIPEC).
