= Carbon storage in the North Sea =

Storage of carbon dioxide in the North Sea

- Carbon storage at sea; besides sea bed storage, there have been proposals to dissolve carbon dioxide in the waters of the North Sea.
- Process type: Chemical
- Main technologies or sub-processes: Clean hydrogen Carbon storage
- Feedstock: Carbon dioxide Hydrogen Natural gas
- Product(s): CO_{2} storage
- Leading companies: See text

Carbon storage in the North Sea (also known as carbon sequestration in the North Sea) includes programmes being run by several Northern European countries to capture carbon (in the form of carbon dioxide, CO_{2}), and store it under the North Sea in either old oil and gas workings, or within saline aquifers. Whilst there have been some moves to international co-operation, most of the Carbon Capture and Storage (CCS) programmes are governed by the laws of the country that is running them. Because the governments have pledged net zero carbon emissions by 2050, they have to find ways to deal with any remaining CO_{2} produced, such as by heavy industry. Around 90% of the identified storage geologies for carbon dioxide in Europe are shared between Norway and the United Kingdom; all of the designated sites for storage are located in the North Sea.

The first carbon storage operation to utilise the North Sea bed, was the Sleipner Field in 1996, which was operated by a Norwegian oil and gas company. However, the storage of carbon was down to the gas product having a high carbon content, and so needed to be scrubbed (stripped) of its carbon, which was pumped back down into the gas well.

== Background ==
The dotted lines show the divisions between countries. Norway & the United Kingdom dominate, with The Netherlands, Denmark & Germany having smaller areas.

Gas and oil were first discovered in the North Sea off the coast of The Netherlands in 1959. This led to a huge oil and gas industry, and whilst the industry peaked around the year 2000, it is projected that gas and oil could be successfully recovered from the North Sea until the 2050s. A 1958 law enacted by the United Nations (United Nations Convention on the Continental Shelf), and a later law from 1982 (United Nations Convention on the Law of the Sea [UNCLOS]), afforded nations certain rights for the use of the seabed on the continental shelf, but also, the responsibilities that a country should adhere to. So, whilst installing oil and gas rigs was allowed, the rigs and pipelines are sometimes required to be removed when the drilling was finished to avoid interfering with shipping and fishing. This is of paramount importance off the coast of The Netherlands where the coastal waters are very shallow, but for Norway and the UK, decisions could be taken on a case-by-case basis, thereby affording the opportunity of re-using the infrastructure for CO_{2} storage.

The previous use of drilling for oil and gas, and the plentiful availability of the saline aquifers on the sea bed, means that Norway and the United Kingdom share 90% of the identified locations that are geologically stable enough to store carbon dioxide under pressure. The chief executive of Storegga, a company behind a scheme to store carbon working from Scotland stated that "..While I don’t doubt there will be other stores found in Europe over time . . . they will still be dwarfed by the North Sea."

Although carbon storage is deemed by most scientists as an essential element to the reduction of greenhouse gas emissions, the cost of removal of the CO_{2}, the transportation and then the eventual storage of the gas, is quite prohibitive, and as countries have pledged a net zero economy by 2050, efforts have been concentrated on the technologies to deal either with the carbon produced, or to remove it entirely. In April 2021, the commercial removal, transportation and storage of CO_{2} was rated at $600 per tonne, but this was expected to be reduced to between $200 and $300 by the late 2020s. (Note: Price estimation as at April 2021.) Despite the necessity to achieve carbon-zero programmes, there has been public opposition to storing carbon onshore, and the North Sea offers the largest offshore storage capacity in Europe.

Whilst studies have developed the prospect of storing CO_{2} in the depths of the sea, where the pressure will keep it submerged, the preferred method is for storage in old oil and gas wells. When CO_{2} mixes with seawater, the imbalance may harm marine life, and would lead to a "measurable change in ocean chemistry".

The first commercial storage of CO_{2} in the North Sea (and in the world) was enacted in 1996 at the Sleipner gas field, though the carbon was removed from the gas on-site (ie, at sea) and pumped into a saline aquifer due to commercial reasons. However, the monitoring of the storage site, and the data acquired over the years provides a useful benchmark for other projects to learn from. A study conducted on the Sleipner storage reservoir in 2003, when it had been in operation for seven years, determined that the CO_{2} would not "migrate into the North Sea for 100,000 years. Others have stated that whilst seepage from storage reservoirs may be inevitable, the loss rate will be negligible and the environmental impact of not storing CO_{2} would be worse. Similarly, a study conducted in the Forties Oil Field, determined that over a 1,000 year period, 0,2% of the CO_{2} would leach out of the storage facility and move upwards. Even so, the maximum distance it would move would be only half the distance to the seabed level. However, some existing oil and gas wells were leaking methane into the sea. A study in 2012/2013, determined that of 43 wells observed in the North Sea, 28 were leaching methane, the second most important greenhouse gas after carbon dioxide. Methane in the sea water leads to acidification of the water.

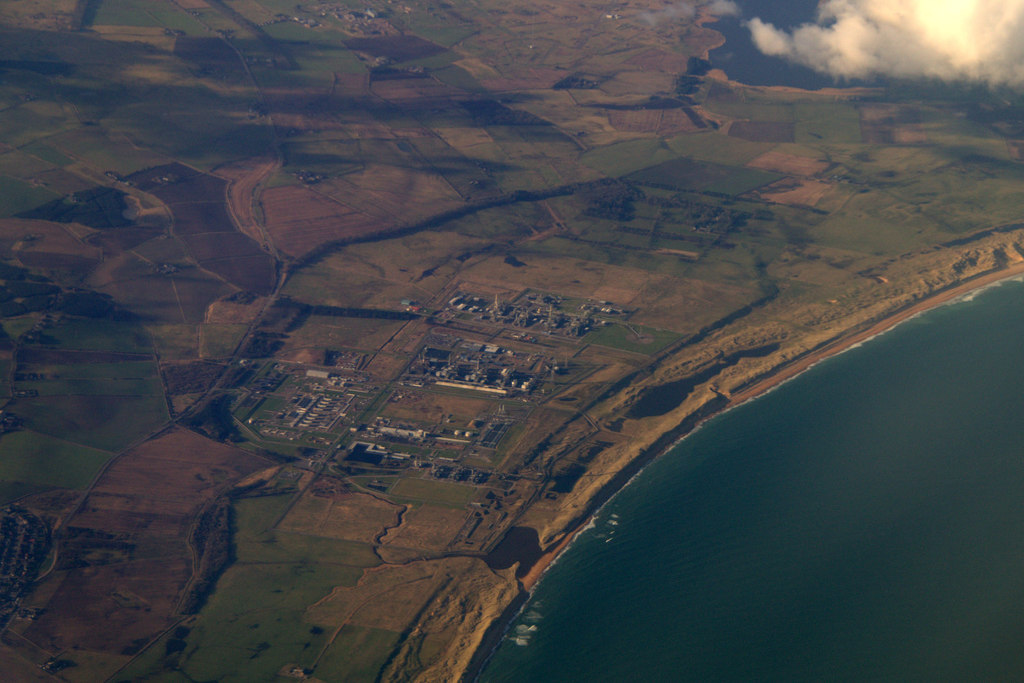
St Fergus Gas Terminal from the air

The ability to re-use depleted oil and gas wells, or saline aquifers, and the ability to back flow carbon dioxide through redundant pipelines, means a cost-saving benefit. A study conducted by University of Edinburgh on the Beatrice Oilfield off the coast of Scotland, determined that decommissioning the oil platform would cost £260 million, but re-purposing the platform to accept captured CO_{2} over a thirty-year period, would cost only £26 million. One scheme slated to be worked from the St Fergus Gas Terminal in Scotland, would save £730 million by pumping the CO_{2} back through the redundant pipelines, saving on investment in transportation. Some of the UK schemes are looking beyond their domestic markets in terms of CO_{2} storage, and will lobby to store the gas on behalf of other nations. One storage site investigated lies 1.6-kilometre (1 mi) down, under the Moray Firth off the east coast of Scotland. The depleted reservoir lies underneath the Captain Sandstone Formation, and if CO_{2} was injected from two points simultaneously, the reservoir has the capacity to store 360,000,000 tonnes (400,000,000 tons) in just 1/6 of its area. This is the amount of CO_{2} emitted by Scotland over 23 years.

In 2009, the European Union issued a directive governing carbon capture and storage, stating that sites for storage need to be secure against harm to human health, and that operators must have the financial backing to see the project through, should problems occur. Companies (and Member States) that store CO_{2} under the conditions of the directive, are free to designate the CO_{2} as not having been "emitted" under the Emission Trading Scheme.

=== Enhanced oil recovery ===
Enhanced oil recovery (EOR) involves injecting CO_{2} into oil fields to force remaining oil and residues out of the field. This can extend the life of the oilfield in addition to storing the CO_{2}, provided the geology is stable enough to do so. The technology for this has been proven onshore, but offshore workings are still under evaluation. Two projects in the North Sea were initiated in 1998 and in 2002, one which involved injected liquid methane into an oil well. The success of the two ventures led to increased confidence in the use of EOR offshore. A further venture at the Forties Oil Field has been suggested, which would store the CO_{2} and make the oil recovery easier, although not economically viable.

== Denmark ==
=== Project Greensand ===
A consortium of three companies (Ineos, Maersk Drilling and Wintershall Dea) are running a project to store carbon in the Nini West oilfield. The susbsea reservoir was confirmed as feasible in November 2020 after a drilling programme determined that it could store 450,000 tonnes (500,000 tons) of captured CO_{2} over a ten-year period. The Nini West subsea reservoir is estimated to be 1.4 miles (2.3 km) below the sea, and in an area which has been geologically stable enough to store oil and gas for 20 million years.

== Norway ==
Gas and oil exploration, drilling, and recovery of assets used in those ventures are awarded by the Ministry of Petroleum and Energy (MPE). As the Continental Shelf in Norwegian waters consists of very deep water, pipelines can be left in-situ when they become redundant provided they do not interfere with fishing rights.

=== Sleipner Field ===
Drilling of the Sleipner Oil and Gas Field initiated a project in 1996 to remove the carbon dioxide from the gas it was acquiring from the gas field some 800 metres (2,600 ft) below the sea level. It was rated with around 9% CO_{2}, which needed to be reduced significantly if the gas was to be commercially acceptable. A CO_{2} level of 2.5% was stipulated due to pipeline specifications and also to meet a carbon tax enacted by the Norwegian Government in 1990. The process involves passing the natural gas through an amine scrubber which removes the CO_{2}, and then the amine/CO_{2} mix is heated up, producing a pure CO_{2} stream that is piped back down to the seabed and stored in a saline reservoir. This reservoir has been monitored since the project started in 1996 so that the cap rock keeps the gas contained. The cap rock is Nordland Shale, with a thickness varying between 200 metres (660 ft) and 300 metres (980 ft).

By 2011, over 13,000,000 tonnes (14,000,000 tons) of CO_{2} had been sequestered in the saline aquifer in the Utsira sand formation underneath the sandstone cap. The operation is carried out with adherence to Norwegian petroleum law.

=== Project Longship ===
In 2011, a project in Norway targeted at reducing carbon in power plants (coal and gas) failed to gain any ground. The project did not work because the energy source could be switched to renewables. In 2021, another proposal, Project Longship, unveiled a kr25 billion ($3 billion) plan to target the carbon emissions from cement, glass, paper and fertiliser plants, which emit large tonnages of carbon in their production processes.

By January 2021, the sides of a fjord outside Bergen had been cut out with explosives to site the tanks needed to store the captured CO_{2}. The consortium running Longship have stated that their aim is to run a business and expect to take shiploads of captured CO_{2} from as far afield as Northern Spain.

== United Kingdom ==
Drilling for oil and gas in and around the United Kingdom is governed by the Petroleum Act 1998, but the storage of CO_{2} is directed by the Energy Act 2008. The UK oil and gas industry is not state owned, as it is in the Netherlands and Norway.

By 2030, the UK government wish to see four industrial clusters, which will trap, transport and store carbon to prevent emissions into the atmosphere. The five largest industrial areas that have been selected to work on this are Grangemouth in Scotland; Teesside, the Humber and Merseyside in England; and Port Talbot in Wales. In 2012, the government sponsored two projects to go forward with CCS; one at Peterhead/St Fergus in Scotland based on the combustion of natural gas, and the other at Drax Power Station in North Yorkshire in England.

Besides the North Sea, which is listed by CO_{2} stored in three different regions (Northern North Sea, Central North Sea, Southern North Sea), the coastal waters around the United Kingdom also have identified sites in the East Irish Sea, and the English Channel. Altogether, sites identified around the UK continental shelf have the capacity to store over 4 billion tonnes (including in the Irish Sea).

=== England ===
NTZ and ZCH carbon storage area in the North Sea

Heavy industry on Teesside and the Humber Estuary, (known as the East Coast Cluster), have combined to focus storing CO_{2} in a saline aquifer under the North Sea, under the name Northern Endurance Partnership. The combined carbon output from the two industrial areas, account for almost 50% of that which is emitted by heavy industry in the United Kingdom. The Endurance storage site, which is 75–90 kilometres (47–56 mi) offshore of the Yorkshire Coast, and 1.6 metres (5 ft 3 in) below the seabed, was initially earmarked for a carbon capture project (the White Rose) from Drax power station, that was cancelled in 2015.

==== Net Zero Teesside (NZT) ====
A proposal to site a power station on the site of the former Redcar Steelworks was announced in 2021. The Whitetail Energy Plant is expected to be operational by 2025. Both NZT and ZCH, aim to be operating fully by 2026, and would look to use the Endurance Aquifer for carbon storage. The original proposal for the White Rose Project, estimated that the storage capacity of the Endurance Aquifer was 54,000,000 tonnes (60,000,000 tons).

==== Zero Carbon Humber ====
Zero Carbon Humber (ZCH) is the Zero Carbon programme for the Humber region which straddles the north and south banks of the Humber Estuary on the East Coast of England. The region is the largest emitter of processed carbon in the United Kingdom, releasing 12,400,000 tonnes (13,700,000 tons) annually. H2H Saltend is a proposed low carbon hydrogen plant that will aim to be producing hydrogen from natural gas by 2027. The cancelled White Rose Project, planned for a pipeline to travel to the aquifer from the Humber area and would leave the coastline at Barmston. The White Rose Project was later resurrected as the Humber Carbon Capture Pipeline (HCCP) which would run from Drax power station along the southern bank of the Humber estuary with various input stations along the route to allow other concerns to sequester carbon into the pipeline. It would then run northwards under the estuary to a terminal at Easington.

In June 2025, the UK government approved a scheme to transfer captured carbon to the Theddlethorpe Gast terminal on the Lincolnshire coast to then enable the captured carbon to be stored under the North Sea.

=== Scotland ===
Acorn CCS intends to focus its efforts on heavy industry around Grangemouth, with the gas terminal at St Fergus being the export point through the Goldeneye Pipeline to the redundant Goldeneye field, 100 kilometres (62 mi) north-east of Aberdeen, and 2 kilometres (1.2 mi) below sea level. The Goldeneye platform exported gas between 2004 and 2011, with permission to decommission the platform in 2019, however, plans were submitted to keep the options open for the rig in case of a CCS programme. The pipeline connecting St Fergus to the Goldeneye field is a carbon-steel tube which is 510 millimetres (20 in) in diameter. The depleted gas well lies at 2,516 metres (8,255 ft), underneath layers of sandstone, shale and chalk. However, funding for the project from the UK government was cancelled in 2015.

A direct air capture project aims to install a plant that sucks air through a giant fan and fixes the carbon in the air to a solution, which can be refined to enable the captured carbon to be stored. The positioning of such a plant in Scotland is thought to be favoured because the engineering involved is akin to the skills needed in the oil and gas industry, and the plant can be sited near to where the gas pipelines come ashore in Scotland.

=== Wales ===
The North Wales cluster will operate jointly with that of the North-West of England. Ahead of the COP 26 summit in Glasgow in 2021, the UK Government announced an investment of at least £140 million, to promote carbon carbon and hydrogen schemes in the North-West England/North Wales cluster, shared jointly with the Humber/Teesside venture. Carbon captured in Wales is planned to be sequestrated in old oil and gas wells in the Irish Sea, or transported to one of the North Sea projects for storage.

== Other countries ==
The Netherlands, Germany, France and Sweden all recognise the need for carbon capture programmes. In 2021, many of these were considering storage under the North Sea. However, none have stated whether they will progress their own storage, or pay for the disposal of the carbon at either the Danish, Norwegian or British sites.

== See also ==
- North Sea oil
- White Rose Project
- Whitetail Clean Energy
