= Allam power cycle =

Fuel to energy conversion process

The Allam Cycle or Allam-Fetvedt Cycle is a process for converting carbonaceous fuels into thermal energy, while capturing the generated carbon dioxide and water.

The inventors are English engineer Rodney John Allam, American engineer Jeremy Eron Fetvedt, American scientist Dr. Miles R Palmer, and American businessman and innovator G. William Brown, Jr. The Allam-Fetvedt Cycle was recognized by MIT Technology Review on the 2018 list of 10 Breakthrough Technologies.

This cycle was validated at a 50 MWth natural gas fed test facility in La Porte, Texas in May 2018.

== Description ==
The Allam-Fetvedt Cycle is a recuperated, high-pressure, Brayton cycle employing a transcritical CO_{2} working fluid with an oxy-fuel combustion regime. This cycle begins by burning a gaseous fuel with oxygen and a hot, high-pressure, recycled supercritical CO_{2} working fluid in a combustor. The recycled CO_{2} stream serves the dual purpose of lowering the combustion flame temperature to a manageable level and diluting the combustion products such that the cycle working fluid is predominantly CO_{2}. The pressure in the combustor can be as high as approximately 30 MPa. The combustion feedstock consists of approximately 95% recycled CO_{2} by mass.

The combustor provides high-pressure exhaust that can be supplied to a turbine expander operating at a pressure ratio between 6 and 12. The expander discharge leaves as a subcritical CO_{2} mixture predominantly commingled with combustion derived water. This fluid enters an economizer heat exchanger, which cools the expander discharge to below 65 °C against the stream of CO_{2} that is recycled to the combustor. Upon exiting the economizer heat exchanger, the expander exhaust is further cooled to near ambient temperature by a central cooling system, enabling liquid water to be removed from the working fluid and recycled for beneficial use.

The remaining working fluid of nearly pure CO_{2} then enters a compression and pumping stage. The compression system consists of a conventional inter-cooled centrifugal compressor with an inlet pressure below the CO_{2} critical pressure. The CO_{2} working fluid is compressed and then cooled to near ambient temperature in the compressor after-cooler. At this point, the combination of compressing and cooling the working fluid permits it to achieve a density in excess of 500 kg/m3. In this condition, the CO_{2} stream can be pumped to the high combustion pressure required using a multi-stage centrifugal pump. Finally, the high-pressure working fluid is sent back through the economizer heat exchanger to be reheated and returned to the combustor.

The net CO_{2} product derived from the addition of fuel and oxygen in the combustor is removed from the high-pressure stream; at this point, the CO_{2} product is under high-pressure and has high purity, ready for sequestration or utilization without requiring further compression.

Mass flow of the Allam cycle components for natural gas fuel (% of total mass entering the combustion stage)
Stage of the cycle	Oxygen	Natural gas	Water (H_{2}O)	Carbon dioxide (CO_{2})	
Combustion Inlet	4.75%	1.25%	–	94% (hot, high pressure)	
Turbine Inlet	–	–	2.75% (very hot steam)	97.25% (very hot)	
Heat Exchanger Inlet (Exhaust)	–	–	2.75% (hot steam)	97.25% (hot, low pressure)	
Heat Exchanger Outlet (Exhaust)	–	–	2.75% (steam condensed)	97.25% (to compressor-pump)	
Compressor-Pump Outlet	–	–	2.75% (steam condensed)	94% (to heat exchanger)	3.25% (CCS/CCUS)
Heat Exchanger Inlet (Recycle)	–	–	2.75% (steam condensed)	94% (compressed)	3.25% (CCS/CCUS)
Heat Exchanger Outlet (Recycle)	–	–	2.75% (steam condensed)	94% (hot, compressed, to be recycled)	3.25% (CCS/CCUS)

In order for the system to achieve high thermal efficiency, a close temperature approach is needed on the high-temperature side of the primary heat exchanger. Due to the cooling process employed at the compression and pumping stage, a large energy imbalance would typically exist in the cycle between the cooling expander exhaust flow and the reheating CO_{2} recycle flow.

The Allam-Fetvedt Cycle corrects this imbalance through the incorporation of low-grade heat at the low-temperature end of the recuperative heat exchanger. Due to the low temperatures at the cool end of the cycle, this low-grade heat only needs to be in the range of 100 °C to 400 °C. A convenient source of this heat is the Air Separation Unit (ASU) required for the oxy-fuel combustion regime.

When burning natural gas as a fuel, this basic configuration has been modeled to achieve an efficiency up to 60% (LHV) as a power cycle net of all parasitic loads, including the energy-intensive ASU. Despite its novelty, the components required by this cycle are commercially available, with the exception of the combustion turbine package. The turbine relies on proven technologies and approaches used by existing gas and steam turbine design tools.

== Applications ==
Construction began in March 2016 in La Porte, Texas on a 50 MWth industrial test facility to showcase the Allam-Fetvedt Cycle, finishing in 2017. In 2018, the Allam-Fetvedt Cycle and supporting technologies were validated, allowing OEMs to certify components for use with future production plants.

On November 15, 2021, at approximately 7:40 pm EST the test facility successfully synchronized to the ERCOT grid proving that the Allam Fetvedt Cycle was capable of generating power at 60 Hz.

This test facility is owned and operated by NET Power, which is owned by Constellation Energy Corporation, Occidental Petroleum (Oxy) Low Carbon Ventures, Baker Hughes and 8 Rivers Capital (the inventor of the technology).

NET Power was awarded the 2018 International Excellence in Energy Breakthrough Technological Project of the Year at the Abu Dhabi International Petroleum Exhibition and Conference (ADIPEC).

== Patent history ==
Patents
Publication Number	Title	Application Date	Publication Date	Current Assignee	Legal Status & Events	Inventor Name
US20100300063A1	Apparatus and Method for Combusting a Fuel at High Pressure and High Temperature, and Associated System and Device	2010-02-26	2010-12-02	8 RIVERS CAPITAL, LLC	Granted Pledge Transfer	PALMER, MILES R.; ALLAM, RODNEY JOHN; BROWN, JR., GLENN WILLIAM
US9416728B2	Apparatus and method for combusting a fuel at high pressure and high temperature, and associated system and device	2010-02-26	2016-08-16	8 RIVERS CAPITAL, LLC	Granted Pledge Transfer	PALMER, MILES R.; ALLAM, RODNEY JOHN; BROWN, JR., GLENN WILLIAM
US20110179799A1	System and method for high efficiency power generation using a carbon dioxide circulating working fluid	2010-08-31	2011-07-28	PALMER LABS, LLC; 8 RIVERS CAPITAL, LLC	Granted Pledge	ALLAM, RODNEY JOHN; PALMER, MILES; BROWN, JR., GLENN WILLIAM
US8596075B2	System and method for high efficiency power generation using a carbon dioxide circulating working fluid	2010-08-31	2013-12-03	PALMER LABS, LLC; 8 RIVERS CAPITAL, LLC	Granted Pledge	ALLAM, RODNEY JOHN; PALMER, MILES; BROWN, JR., GLENN WILLIAM
US20120067056A1	System and method for high efficiency power generation using a nitrogen gas working fluid	2011-09-19	2012-03-22	8 RIVERS CAPITAL, LLC	Granted Pledge	PALMER, MILES; ALLAM, RODNEY JOHN; FETVEDT, JEREMY ERON
US20120067568A1	Method of using carbon dioxide in recovery of formation deposits	2011-09-19	2012-03-22	PALMER LABS, LLC; 8 RIVERS CAPITAL, LLC	Granted Pledge	PALMER, MILES; ALLAM, RODNEY JOHN; FETVEDT, JEREMY ERON; FREED, DAVID ARTHUR; BROWN, JR., GLENN WILLIAM
US8869889B2	Method of using carbon dioxide in recovery of formation deposits	2011-09-19	2014-10-28	PALMER LABS, LLC; 8 RIVERS CAPITAL, LLC	Granted Pledge	PALMER, MILES; ALLAM, RODNEY JOHN; FETVEDT, JEREMY ERON; FREED, DAVID ARTHUR; BROWN, JR., GLENN WILLIAM
US9410481B2	System and method for high efficiency power generation using a nitrogen gas working fluid	2011-09-19	2016-08-09	8 RIVERS CAPITAL, LLC	Granted Pledge	PALMER, MILES; ALLAM, RODNEY JOHN; FETVEDT, JEREMY ERON
US20130205746A1	Partial oxidation reaction with closed cycle quench	2013-02-11	2013-08-15	PALMER LABS, LLC; 8 RIVERS CAPITAL, LLC	Granted Pledge	ALLAM, RODNEY JOHN; FETVEDT, JEREMY ERON; PALMER, MILES R.
US8776532B2	Partial oxidation reaction with closed cycle quench	2013-02-11	2014-07-15	PALMER LABS, LLC; 8 RIVERS CAPITAL, LLC	Granted Pledge	ALLAM, RODNEY JOHN; FETVEDT, JEREMY ERON; PALMER, MILES R.
US20130199195A1	System and method for high efficiency power generation using a carbon dioxide circulating working fluid	2013-03-14	2013-08-08	PALMER LABS, LLC; 8 RIVERS CAPITAL, LLC	Granted Pledge	ALLAM, RODNEY JOHN; PALMER, MILES R.; BROWN, JR., GLENN WILLIAM
US9062608B2	System and method for high efficiency power generation using a carbon dioxide circulating working fluid	2013-03-14	2015-06-23	PALMER LABS, LLC; 8 RIVERS CAPITAL, LLC	Granted Pledge	ALLAM, RODNEY JOHN; PALMER, MILES R.; BROWN, JR., GLENN WILLIAM
US10018115B2	System and method for high efficiency power generation using a carbon dioxide circulating working fluid	2013-03-15	2018-07-10	PALMER LABS, LLC; 8 RIVERS CAPITAL, LLC	Granted Pledge	ALLAM, RODNEY JOHN; PALMER, MILES R.; BROWN, JR., GLENN WILLIAM; FETVEDT, JEREMY ERON; FORREST, BROCK ALAN
US20130213049A1	System and method for high efficiency power generation using a carbon dioxide circulating working fluid	2013-03-15	2013-08-22	PALMER LABS, LLC; 8 RIVERS CAPITAL, LLC	Granted Pledge	ALLAM, RODNEY JOHN; PALMER, MILES R.; BROWN, JR., GLENN WILLIAM; FETVEDT, JEREMY ERON; FORREST, BROCK ALAN
US20140053529A1	System and method for high efficiency power generation using a carbon dioxide circulating working fluid	2013-11-04	2014-02-27	PALMER LABS, LLC; 8 RIVERS CAPITAL, LLC	Granted Pledge	ALLAM, RODNEY JOHN; BROWN, JR., GLENN WILLIAM; PALMER, MILES R.
US8959887B2	System and method for high efficiency power generation using a carbon dioxide circulating working fluid	2013-11-04	2015-02-24	PALMER LABS, LLC; 8 RIVERS CAPITAL, LLC	Granted Pledge	ALLAM, RODNEY JOHN; BROWN, JR., GLENN WILLIAM; PALMER, MILES R.
US20140290263A1	Partial oxidation reaction with closed cycle quench	2014-06-12	2014-10-02	8 RIVERS CAPITAL, LLC; PALMER LABS, LLC	Granted	ALLAM, RODNEY JOHN; FETVEDT, JEREMY ERON; PALMER, MILES R.
US9581082B2	Partial oxidation reaction with closed cycle quench	2014-06-12	2017-02-28	8 RIVERS CAPITAL, LLC; PALMER LABS, LLC	Granted	ALLAM, RODNEY JOHN; FETVEDT, JEREMY ERON; PALMER, MILES R.
US10927679B2	High efficiency power production methods, assemblies, and systems	2014-07-25	2021-02-23	8 RIVERS CAPITAL, LLC	Granted	PALMER, MILES R.; FETVEDT, JEREMY ERON; ALLAM, RODNEY JOHN
US20140331687A1	High Efficiency Power Production Methods, Assemblies, and Systems	2014-07-25	2014-11-13	8 RIVERS CAPITAL, LLC	Granted	PALMER, MILES R.; FETVEDT, JEREMY ERON; ALLAM, RODNEY JOHN
US10047671B2	System and method for high efficiency power generation using a carbon dioxide circulating working fluid	2015-01-23	2018-08-14	8 RIVERS CAPITAL, LLC	Granted	ALLAM, RODNEY JOHN; BROWN, JR., GLENN WILLIAM; PALMER, MILES R.
US20160215693A1	System and method for high efficiency power generation using a carbon dioxide circulating working fluid	2015-01-23	2016-07-28	8 RIVERS CAPITAL, LLC	Granted	ALLAM, RODNEY JOHN; BROWN, JR., GLENN WILLIAM; PALMER, MILES R.
US20150252724A1	System and method for high efficiency power generation using a carbon dioxide circulating working fluid	2015-05-20	2015-09-10	8 RIVERS CAPITAL, LLC	Granted	ALLAM, RODNEY JOHN; PALMER, MILES R.; BROWN, JR., GLENN WILLIAM
US9869245B2	System and method for high efficiency power generation using a carbon dioxide circulating working fluid	2015-05-20	2018-01-16	8 RIVERS CAPITAL, LLC	Granted	ALLAM, RODNEY JOHN; PALMER, MILES R.; BROWN, JR., GLENN WILLIAM
US20160319741A1	System and method for high efficiency power generation using a nitrogen gas working fluid	2016-07-14	2016-11-03	8 RIVERS CAPITAL, LLC	Granted	PALMER, MILES; ALLAM, RODNEY JOHN; FETVEDT, JEREMY ERON
US9611785B2	System and method for high efficiency power generation using a nitrogen gas working fluid	2016-07-14	2017-04-04	8 RIVERS CAPITAL, LLC	Granted	PALMER, MILES; ALLAM, RODNEY JOHN; FETVEDT, JEREMY ERON
US10054046B2	System and method for high efficiency power generation using a nitrogen gas working fluid	2017-03-10	2018-08-21	8 RIVERS CAPITAL, LLC	Granted	PALMER, MILES; ALLAM, RODNEY JOHN; FETVEDT, JEREMY ERON
US20180016979A1	System and method for high efficiency power generation using a nitrogen gas working fluid	2017-03-10	2018-01-18	8 RIVERS CAPITAL, LLC	Granted	PALMER, MILES; ALLAM, RODNEY JOHN; FETVEDT, JEREMY ERON
US10989113B2	System and method for power production using partial oxidation	2017-09-13	2021-04-27	8 RIVERS CAPITAL, LLC	Granted	FORREST, BROCK ALAN; LU, XIJIA; ALLAM, RODNEY JOHN; FETVEDT, JEREMY ERON; PALMER, MILES R.
US20180073430A1	System and method for power production using partial oxidation	2017-09-13	2018-03-15	8 RIVERS CAPITAL, LLC	Granted	FORREST, BROCK ALAN; LU, XIJIA; ALLAM, RODNEY JOHN; FETVEDT, JEREMY ERON; PALMER, MILES R.
US10975766B2	System and method for high efficiency power generation using a carbon dioxide circulating working fluid	2018-06-13	2021-04-13	8 RIVERS CAPITAL, LLC	Granted	ALLAM, RODNEY JOHN; PALMER, MILES R.; BROWN, JR., GLENN WILLIAM; FETVEDT, JEREMY ERON; FORREST, BROCK ALAN
US20180291805A1	System and method for high efficiency power generation using a carbon dioxide circulating working fluid	2018-06-13	2018-10-11	8 RIVERS CAPITAL, LLC	Granted	ALLAM, RODNEY JOHN; PALMER, MILES R.; BROWN, JR., GLENN WILLIAM; FETVEDT, JEREMY ERON; FORREST, BROCK ALAN

== See also ==
- Oxy-fuel combustion process
