= Weyburn-Midale Carbon Dioxide Project =

Carbon Storage Project

The Weyburn-Midale Carbon Dioxide Project (or IEA GHG Weyburn-Midale CO_{2} Monitoring and Storage Project) was a large carbon capture and storage project. It has however been overtaken in terms of carbon capture capacity by projects such as the Shute Creek project and the Century Plant. It is located in Midale, Saskatchewan, Canada.

== Introduction ==
The IEAGHG Weyburn-Midale CO_{2} Monitoring and Storage Project is an international collaborative scientific study to assess the technical feasibility of CO_{2} storage in geological formations with a focus on oil reservoirs, together with the development of world leading best practices for project implementation. The project itself began in 2000 and ran until the end of 2011 when a best practices manual for the transitioning of CO_{2}-EOR operations into long-term storage operations was released.

The research project accesses data from the actual CO_{2}-enhanced oil recovery operations in the Weyburn oil field (formerly operated by Cenovus Energy of Calgary before its Saskatchewan operations were sold to Whitecap Resources in 2017), and after the year 2005 from the adjacent Midale field (operated by Apache Canada). These EOR operations are independent of the research program. Cenovus Energy's only contribution to the IEAGHG Weyburn-Midale CO_{2} Monitoring and Storage Project was to allow access to the fields for measurement, monitoring and verification of the CO_{2} for the global scientists and researchers involved in the project.

== History – The Weyburn oilfield ==
The Weyburn and Midale oil fields were discovered in 1954 near Midale, Saskatchewan.

The Weyburn Oilfield covers an area of some 52,000 acres (210 km^{2}) and has a current oil production rate of ~3,067 m3/day. Original oil-in-place is estimated to be 1.4 billion barrels (220,000,000 m^{3}). The oil is produced from a total of 963 active wells made up of 534 vertical wells, 138 horizontal wells, and 171 injection systems. There are also 146 enclosed wells. Current production consists primarily of medium-gravity crude oil with a low gas-to-oil ratio.

The Midale oil field is about 102 square miles (260 km^{2}) in size, and has 515 million barrels (81,900,000 m^{3}) of oil-in-place. It began injecting CO_{2} in 2005.

Various enhanced oil recovery techniques were used in the Weyburn field prior to the introduction of CO_{2}, between the 1970s and 1990s. These include additional vertical drilling, the introduction of horizontal drilling, and the use of waterfloods to increase pressure in the reservoir. In October 2000, Cenovus (formerly Pan Canadian, Encana) began injecting significant amounts of carbon dioxide into the Weyburn field in order to boost oil production. Cenovus was the operator and held the largest share of the 37 current partners in the oilfield prior to the sale of local assets to Whitecap in 2017.

== History – Injection of CO_{2} ==
Initial CO_{2} injection rates in the Weyburn field amounted to ~5,000 tonnes/day or 95 million scf/day (2.7 million m3/d); this would otherwise have been vented to the atmosphere from the Dakota Gasification facility. At one point, CO_{2} injection by Cenovus at Weyburn was at ~6,500 tonnes per day. Apache Canada is injecting approximately 1,500 tonnes/day into the Midale field.

Overall, it is anticipated that some 40 Mt of carbon dioxide will be permanently sequestered over the lifespan of the project in the Weyburn and Midale fields. The gas is being supplied via a 320 kilometre mile long pipeline (completed in 1999) from the lignite-fired Dakota Gasification Company synfuels plant site in Beulah, North Dakota (See attached image). The company is a subsidiary of Basin Electric Power Co-operative. At the plant, CO_{2} is produced from a Rectisol unit in the gas cleanup train. The CO_{2} project adds about $30 million of gross revenue to the gasification plant's cash flow each year. Approximately 8000 tonnes/day of compressed CO_{2} (in liquid form) is provided to the Weyburn and Midale fields via the pipeline.

During its life, the Weyburn and Midale fields combined are expected to produce at least 220 million additional barrels of incremental oil, through miscible or near-miscible displacement with CO_{2}, from a fields that have already produced over 500 million barrels (79,000,000 m^{3}) since discovery in 1954. This will extend the life of the Weyburn field by approximately 20–25 years. It is estimated that ultimate oil recovery will increase to 34% of the oil-in-place. It has been estimated that, on a full life-cycle basis, the oil produced at Weyburn by CO_{2} EOR will release only two-thirds as much CO_{2} to the atmosphere compared to oil produced using conventional technology.

This is the first instance of cross-border transfer of CO_{2} from the US to Canada and highlights the ability for international cooperation with GHG mitigation technologies. Whilst there are emissions trading projects being developed within countries such as Canada, the Weyburn project is essentially the first international project where physical quantities of CO_{2} are being sold commercially for enhanced oil recovery, with the added benefit of carbon sequestration.

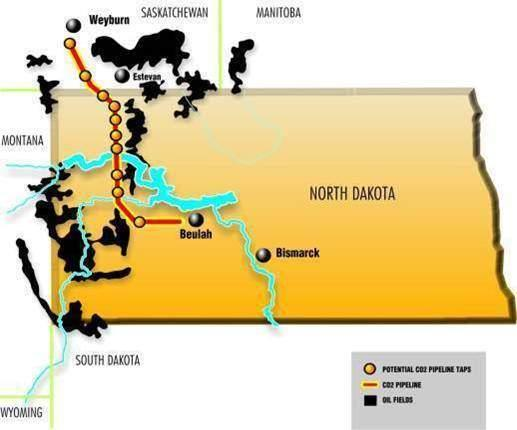

== History – Research project ==
The First Phase of the IEAGHG Weyburn CO_{2} Monitoring and Storage Project (the Midale oil field did not join the research project until the Final phase research) which began in 2000 and ended in 2004, verified the ability of an oil reservoir to securely store CO_{2} for significant lengths of time. This was done through a comprehensive analysis of the various process factors as well as monitoring/modeling methods designed to measure, monitor and track the CO_{2}. Research was conducted into geological characterization of both the geosphere (the geological layers deeper than near surface) and biosphere (basically from the depths of groundwater up). As well, prediction, monitoring and verification techniques were used to examine the movements of the CO_{2}. Finally, both the economic and geologic limits of the CO_{2} storage capacity were predicted, and a long-term risk assessment developed for storage of CO_{2} permanently in the formation.

A critical part of the First Phase was the accumulation of baseline surveys for both CO_{2} soil content, and water wells in the area. These baselines were identified in 2001 and have helped to confirm through comparison with more recent readings that CO_{2} is not leaking from the reservoir into the biosphere in the study area.

== First phase findings ==
- Based on preliminary results, the natural geological setting of the oil field was deemed to be highly suitable for long-term CO_{2} geological storage.
- The results form the most complete, comprehensive, peer-reviewed data set in the world for CO_{2} geological storage. However, additional research was deemed to be needed to further develop and refine CO_{2} monitoring and verification technologies. With this in mind, a second and final phase of research was developed and began in the year 2005, and will be completed in 2011.
- The PTRC and IEA GHG issued a full report on the first phase, and it is available from the PTRC's website.

== The Final Phase project (2005–2011) ==
The Final Phase of the IEAGHG Weyburn-Midale CO_{2} Monitoring and Storage Project utilized scientific experts from most of the world's leading carbon capture and storage research organizations and universities to further develop and build upon the most scrutinized CO_{2} geological storage data set in the world. The project's major technical research "themes" can be broadly broken out into four areas:

Technical Components:

- Site Characterization: The research will develop geocellular framework models that incorporate geotechnical and simulation work that will help with proper risk management of the site.
- Wellbore Integrity: increase the knowledge, and assess the risk of leakage from enclosed wells caused by materials and cement degradation. This issue is viewed as critical for resolving questions around long-term storage.
- Monitoring and Verification: Field test and assess a range of geochemical and geophysical techniques for monitoring the injected CO_{2}.
- Performance Assessment: Perform simulations for containment and performance assessments; engage public stakeholders and experts in the risk assessment process.

Ultimately, the goal of the final phase of the project is to produce a best practices manual that can be used by other jurisdictions and organizations to help transition CO_{2}-EOR operations into long-term storage projects. The research of the project's final phase was completed in 2011, with the Best Practices Manual issued in 2012.

== Claims of leaking ==
A report of CO_{2} leaks above the project was released in January 2011 by an advocacy group on behalf of owners of land above the project. They reported ponds fizzing with bubbles, dead animals found near those ponds, sounds of explosions which they attributed to gas blowing out holes in the walls of a quarry. The report said that carbon dioxide levels in the soil averaged about 23,000 parts per million, several times higher than is normal for the area. "The ... source of the high concentrations of CO2 in the soils of the Kerr property is clearly the anthropogenic CO2 injected into the Weyburn reservoir... The survey also demonstrates that the overlying thick cap rock of anhydrite over the Weyburn reservoir is not an impermeable barrier to the upward movement of light hydrocarbons and CO2 as is generally thought." said the report.

The PTRC posted an extensive rebuttal of the Petro-Find report, stating that the isotopic signatures of the CO_{2}, claimed by Mr. Lafleur to be indicative of the manmade CO_{2} being injected into the reservoir, were in fact, according to studies of CO_{2} conducted by the British Geological Survey and two other European Union geological groups prior to CO_{2} being injected at Weyburn, occurring naturally in several locations near the Kerr farm. Subsequent soil surveys after injection in 2002 to 2005 found CO_{2} levels dropped in these same regions. In addition, prior to injection occurring into the oil field, these samplings were found to be as high as 125,000 parts per million and averaging 25,000 ppm CO_{2} across the region, even more than the average and largest readings from the Kerr's property that were being claimed as unusually high. The report also questions, based on seismic imaging conducted over ten years, that any active faults exist or that the caprock is compromised to allow pathways for the CO_{2} to reach the surface. The PTRC acknowledged that they do not monitor the entire site for leaks, rather primarily above the part of the Weyburn field where CO_{2} is injected and key locations outside it, but the organization did monitor the Kerr's well between 2002 and 2006, finding no appreciable difference in water quality. They have also acknowledged that PTRC is a research organisation rather than a regulator, and manage the IEA GHG Weyburn-Midale CO_{2} Monitoring and Storage Project on behalf of the International Energy Agency's Greenhouse Gas R&D Programme, which includes some 30 international research groups.
