= Staged combustion =

Staged combustion

Staged combustion is a method used to reduce the emission of nitrogen oxides (NO_{x}) during combustion. There are two methods for staged combustion: air staged supply and fuel staged supply. Applications of staged combustion include boilers and rocket engines.

== Air staged supply ==
Air staging, or two-stage combustion, is generally described as the introduction of over-fire air into a boiler or furnace. Staging the air in the burner (internal air staging) is generally a design feature of low NO_{x} burners.

Furnace over-fire air (OFA) technology requires the introduction of combustion air to then be separated into primary and secondary flow sections. This achieves complete burnout and encourages the formation of nitrogen gas (N_{2}) rather than NO_{x}.

Primary air (70-90%) is mixed with the fuel, producing a relatively low temperature, oxygen-deficient, fuel-rich zone, leading to only moderate amounts of NO_{x} being formed.

The secondary (10-30%) combustion air is injected above the combustion zone through a special wind-box with air-introducing ports and/or nozzles, which are mounted above the burners.

Combustion is completed at this increased flame volume. Hence, the relatively low-temperature secondary stage limits the production of thermal NO_{x}. The location of the injection ports and the mixing of over-fire air is critical to maintaining efficient combustion.

Retrofitting over-fire air on an existing boiler involves water-wall tube modifications to create the ports for the secondary air nozzles and the addition of ducts, dampers, and the wind-box. This technique is currently used in 116 pulverized coal-fired units on a total capacity of 50 gigawatt electrical (GW_{e}) as a standalone measure.

It is used in combination with other primary measures for NO_{x} control in 175 coal-fired units on a total capacity of 53 GW_{e}.

Via air staged supply, a NO_{x} reduction rate from 50-75% is possible. Air staged supply also leverages a simple configuration and is applicable in small-scale combustion.

== Fuel staged supply ==
One form of fuel staged combustion is the procedure known as burner out of service (BOOS). The technique involves shutting off the fuel flow from one burner or more to create fuel-rich and fuel-lean zones, achieving some NO_{x} emission control (10%). The technique is not widely used in pulverized coal-fired plants (2 units, 350 MW_{e}).

Another method of fuel staged combustion is fuel biasing. In fuel biasing, combustion is staged by diverting fuel from the upper-level burners to the lower ones or from the center to the side burners. The aim is to create a fuel-rich lower or central zone and a fuel-lean upper or side zone in order to achieve complete burnout. The technology lowers the flame temperature and improves the balance of the oxygen concentration in the furnace. NO_{x} emissions may be reduced by up to 30% using this technology. This technique is used in 13 pulverized coal-fired units on a total capacity of 2.7 GW_{e}.

Via fuel staged supply, a NO_{x} reduction rate from 50-75% is also possible, though minor temperature instabilities at the reduction zone can occur and a lower temperature is necessary. While applicable in large-scale combustion, fuel staged combustion uses a more complex constructive configuration.

== History ==
Staged combustion dates back to the hot bulb engine of the 1890s. The first stage of combustion occurred inside a hot bulb, where the hot gases were forced out into the cylinder. Then, when mixed with additional air, the second stage of combustion took place. During those times, staged combustion was used because it was a convenient method of ignition, and, likely, there was not much concern about air pollution. A modern application of the principle is the Stratified charge engine, in which a spark ignites a rich mixture and the resulting flame-front ignites the weaker mixture elsewhere in the cylinder.

== See also ==
- Staged combustion cycle (rocket)
