= Korea Carbon Capture & Sequestration R&D Center =

South Korean technology company

The Korea Carbon Capture & Sequestration R&D Center (KCRC) is an institution in Daejeon, South Korea, specialized in Carbon Capture & Sequestration (CCS) R&D. The Korean government has selected CCS technology as part of core technologies for green growth, and has established the National Comprehensive Plan for CCS to commercialize and ensure the international competitiveness of CCS technology by 2020. As part of the plan, the Ministry of Science, ICT and future Planning (MSIP) has developed the ‘Korea CCS 2020 Project' to secure the best original technology of CCS and established KCRC on December 22, 2011.

== Vision ==
The vision of KCRC is to build a research basis and develop innovative original CCS technology by integrating Korea's CCS research capabilities.

== Carbon Capture and Sequestration (CCS) ==
Carbon Capture and Sequestration (CCS) is a technology to capture the large quantities of carbon dioxide (CO_{2}) normally released into the atmosphere from the use of fossil fuel in power generation and other industries, transport the captured/compressed CO_{2} to a location for permanent storage site, and inject it into deep underground geologic formations to securely store it or convert it into useful materials.

== Korea CCS 2020 Project ==
Goal

- To secure original CCS technology to economically capture CO_{2} from large final emitters

Overview

- Periods : November 1, 2011 ~ May 31, 2020 (Approximately 9 years)
- Budgets : 172.7 billion KRW
- Supported Subcontract Projects (as of 2013) : 42 Industry-University-Institute including Korea Institute of Energy Research, Korea Research Institute of Chemical Technology, Korea Institute of Science & Technology, Seoul National University, Korea University, Yonsei University, Korea Advanced Institute of Science and Technology, University of Texas, and University of California
- Participants : 600 researchers with master's and doctoral degrees

== Major Roles ==
Implement Korea CCS 2020 Project

- Develop innovative original CCS technology

- Secure more than 4 types of 3rd generation original CO_{2} capture technology
- Demonstrate Korea's first integration technology for 10,000 tons of CO_{2} capture-transport-storage and secure core technology
- Develop more than 2 original technologies for CO_{2} conversion applicable to large final emitters

Build CCS Infrastructure

- Think Tank for CCS Technology Policy

- Develop R&D policy and research planning
- Establish R&D portfolio
- Promote CCS public acceptance
- Improve CCS legal system
- Build a network through international cooperation in the field of CCS

- R&D planning and outcome management

- Plan R&D through moving targets
- Promote commercialization through core technology spin-off and technology transfer
- Disseminate outcomes by operating IPR Trust System
- Information Exchange Platform for CCS Technology
- Develop and operate professional CCS education & training programs
- Provide information on the analysis of CCS R&D and policy trends of Korea and other countries
- Integrate research capabilities by holding Annual Korea CCS Conference
