= Enhanced oil recovery =

Extraction of otherwise nonviable crude oil

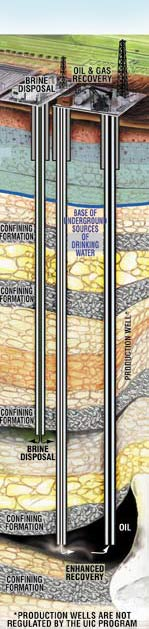
Injection well used for enhanced oil recovery

Enhanced oil recovery (abbreviated EOR), also called tertiary recovery, is the extraction of crude oil from an oil field after primary and secondary recovery methods have been completely exhausted. Whereas primary and secondary recovery techniques rely on the pressure differential between the surface and the underground well, enhanced oil recovery functions by altering the physical or chemical properties of the oil itself in order to make it easier to extract. When EOR is used, 30% to 60% or more of a reservoir's oil can be extracted, compared to 20% to 40% using only primary and secondary recovery.

There are four main EOR techniques: carbon dioxide (CO_{2}) injection, gas injection, thermal EOR, and chemical EOR. More advanced, speculative EOR techniques are sometimes called quaternary recovery. Carbon dioxide injection, known as CO_{2}-EOR, is the most common method. In this method, CO_{2} is injected into a depleted oil field and is mostly left underground.

CO_{2}-EOR is usually performed using CO_{2} from naturally occurring underground deposits. It is also sometimes performed using CO_{2} captured from the flue gas of industrial facilities. When EOR is done using CO_{2} captured from flue gas, the process can prevent some emissions from escaping. However, there is controversy over whether the overall process is beneficial for the climate. EOR operations are energy-intensive, which leads to more emissions, and further emissions are produced when the recovered oil is burned.

EOR adds to the cost of producing oil but can be economically attractive if the price of oil is high. The U.S. Department of Energy estimates that 20 billion tons of captured CO_{2} could produce 67 billion barrels of economically recoverable oil. As a means of boosting domestic oil production, the US federal tax code began to include incentives for EOR in 1979.

== Purpose ==
Crude oil development and production can include up to three distinct phases: primary, secondary, and tertiary (or enhanced) recovery. During primary recovery, the natural pressure of the reservoir or gravity drive oil into the wellbore, combined with artificial lift techniques (such as pumps) which bring the oil to the surface. But only about 10 percent of a reservoir's original oil in place is typically produced during primary recovery. Secondary recovery techniques extend a field's productive life generally by injecting water or gas to displace oil and drive it to a production wellbore, resulting in the recovery of 20 to 40 percent of the original oil in place.

Producers have attempted several tertiary, or enhanced oil recovery (EOR), techniques that offer prospects for ultimately producing 30 to 60 percent, or more, of the reservoir's original oil in place.

== Methods ==
The main classes of EOR technologies are:

- CO_{2} EOR: CO_{2} is injected into the subsurface.
- Other gas injection EOR: similar to CO_{2}-EOR, but with other gases injected such as natural gas or nitrogen.
- Thermal EOR: steam is used to heat the oil in the ground, reducing its viscosity and making it easier to move. This is most often applied in heavy oil reservoirs.
- Chemical EOR: water soluble polymers and/or surfactants are added to water that is injected into the subsurface. Polymer-loaded water has a high viscosity and can push more oil out of the pores in the oil-bearing formation. Surfactants reduce the surface tension of the oil, improving its ability to be displaced by water.
- Other EOR: this class contains all other technologies such as microbial EOR, in which micro-organisms are injected in the reservoir, or combustion EOR, which involves in-situ burning of some of the oil to generate both heat and gases that help the rest of the oil move more easily.

In 2017, there were 374 EOR projects worldwide. Of these, 44% were CO_{2}-EOR, 12% were other gas injection EOR, 32% were thermal EOR, 9% were chemical EOR, and 2% were other EOR methods.

=== Injection of CO_{2} or other gases ===
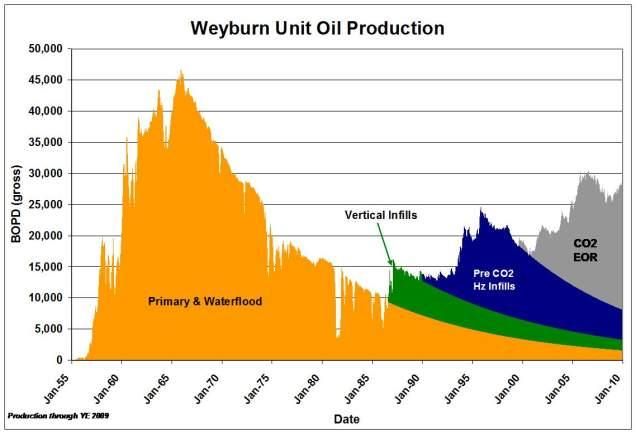
Weyburn-Midale Oil production over time, both before and after EOR was introduced to the field.

Gas injection or miscible flooding is presently the most-commonly used approach in enhanced oil recovery. Miscible flooding is a general term for injection processes that introduce miscible gases into the reservoir. A miscible displacement process maintains reservoir pressure and improves oil displacement because the interfacial tension between oil and gas is reduced. This refers to removing the interface between the two interacting fluids. This allows for total displacement efficiency. Gases used include CO_{2}, natural gas or nitrogen. The fluid most commonly used for miscible displacement is carbon dioxide because it reduces the oil viscosity and is less expensive than liquefied petroleum gas. Oil displacement by carbon dioxide injection relies on the phase behavior of the mixtures of that gas and the crude, which are strongly dependent on reservoir temperature, pressure and crude oil composition.

Using CO_{2} for enhanced oil recovery was first investigated and patented in 1952. The process was first commercially attempted in 1977 in Scurry County, Texas. Since then, the process has become extensively used in the Permian basin region of the US and is now more recently is being pursued in many different states. It is now being more actively pursued in China and throughout the rest of the world.

Most CO_{2} injected in CO_{2}-EOR projects comes from naturally occurring underground CO_{2} deposits. Some CO_{2} used in EOR is captured from industrial facilities such as natural gas processing plants, using carbon capture technology.

==== Supercritical carbon dioxide ====
CO_{2} is particularly effective in reservoirs deeper than 2,000 ft., where CO_{2} will be in a supercritical state. In high pressure applications with lighter oils, CO_{2} is miscible with the oil, with resultant swelling of the oil, and reduction in viscosity, and possibly also with a reduction in the surface tension with the reservoir rock. In the case of low pressure reservoirs or heavy oils, CO_{2} will form an immiscible fluid, or will only partially mix with the oil. Some oil swelling may occur, and oil viscosity can still be significantly reduced.

In these applications, between one-half and two-thirds of the injected CO_{2} returns with the produced oil and is usually re-injected into the reservoir to minimize operating costs. The remainder is trapped in the oil reservoir by various means. Carbon dioxide as a solvent has the benefit of being more economical than other similarly miscible fluids such as propane and butane.

==== Water-alternating-gas (WAG) ====
Water-alternating-gas (WAG) injection is another technique employed in EOR. Water is used in addition to carbon dioxide. A saline solution is used here so that carbonate formations in oil wells are not disturbed. Water and carbon dioxide are injected into the oil well for larger recovery, as they typically have low miscibility with oil. Use of both water and carbon dioxide also lowers the mobility of carbon dioxide, causing the gas to displace more oil. According to a study done by Kovscek, using small slugs of both carbon dioxide and water allows for quick recovery of the oil. Additionally, in a study done by Dang in 2014, using water with a lower salinity allows for greater oil removal, and greater geochemical interactions.

=== Thermal injection ===
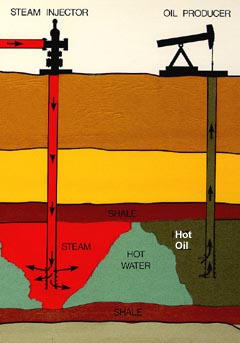
The steam flooding technique

In this approach, various methods are used to heat the crude oil in the formation to reduce its viscosity and/or vaporize part of the oil and thus decrease the mobility ratio. The increased heat reduces the surface tension and increases the permeability of the oil. The heated oil may also vaporize and then condense forming improved oil. Methods include cyclic steam injection, steam flooding and combustion. These methods improve the sweep efficiency and the displacement efficiency. Steam injection has been used commercially since the 1960s in California fields. In solar thermal enhanced oil recovery, a solar array is used to produce the steam.

==== Steam flooding ====
Steam flooding (see sketch) is one means of introducing heat to the reservoir by pumping steam into the well with a pattern similar to that of water injection. Eventually the steam condenses to hot water; in the steam zone the oil evaporates, and in the hot water zone the oil expands. As a result, the oil expands, the viscosity drops, and the permeability increases. To ensure success the process has to be cyclical. This is the principal enhanced oil recovery program in use today.

==== Fire flooding ====
Fire flooding works best when the oil saturation and porosity are high. Combustion generates the heat within the reservoir itself. Continuous injection of air or other gas mixture with high oxygen content will maintain the flame front. As the fire burns, it moves through the reservoir toward production wells. Heat from the fire reduces oil viscosity and helps vaporize reservoir water to steam. The steam, hot water, combustion gas and a bank of distilled solvent all act to drive oil in front of the fire toward production wells.

There are three methods of combustion: Dry forward, reverse and wet combustion. Dry forward uses an igniter to set fire to the oil. As the fire progresses the oil is pushed away from the fire toward the producing well. In reverse the air injection and the ignition occur from opposite directions. In wet combustion water is injected just behind the front and turned into steam by the hot rock. This quenches the fire and spreads the heat more evenly.

=== Chemical injection ===
The injection of various chemicals, usually as dilute solutions, have been used to aid mobility and the reduction in surface tension. Injection of alkaline or caustic solutions into reservoirs with oil that have organic acids naturally occurring in the oil will result in the production of soap that may lower the interfacial tension enough to increase production. Injection of a dilute solution of a water-soluble polymer to increase the viscosity of the injected water can increase the amount of oil recovered in some formations. Dilute solutions of surfactants such as petroleum sulfonates or biosurfactants such as rhamnolipids may be injected to lower the interfacial tension or capillary pressure that impedes oil droplets from moving through a reservoir, this is analyzed in terms of the bond number, relating capillary forces to gravitational ones. Special formulations of oil, water and surfactant, microemulsions, can be particularly effective in reducing interfacial tension. Application of these methods is usually limited by the cost of the chemicals and their adsorption and loss onto the rock of the oil containing formation. In all of these methods the chemicals are injected into several wells and the production occurs in other nearby wells.

==== Polymer flooding ====
Polymer flooding consists in mixing long chain polymer molecules with the injected water in order to increase the water viscosity. This method improves the vertical and areal sweep efficiency as a consequence of improving the water/oil mobility ratio.

Surfactants may be used in conjunction with polymers and hyperbranched polyglycerols; they decrease the interfacial tension between the oil and water. This reduces the residual oil saturation and improves the macroscopic efficiency of the process.

Primary surfactants usually have co-surfactants, activity boosters, and co-solvents added to them to improve stability of the formulation.

Caustic flooding is the addition of sodium hydroxide to injection water. This lowers the surface tension, reverses the rock's wettability, emulsifies and mobilizes the oil, and helps in drawing the oil out of the rock.

==== Low salinity nanofluids ====
EOR processes can be enhanced with nanoparticles in three ways: nanocatalysts, nanofluids, and nanoemulsions. Nanofluids are base fluids that contain nanoparticles in colloidal suspensions. Nanofluids perform many functions in EOR of oil fields, including pore disjoining pressure, channel plugging, interfacial tension reduction, mobility ratio, wettability alteration, and asphaltene precipitation prevention. Nanofluids facilitates disjoining pressure to remove sediment entrapped oil via aggregation at the interface. Alternatively, wettability alteration and interfacial surface tension reduction are other alternative mechanism of EOR.

=== Other EOR methods ===
==== Microbial injection ====
Microbial injection is part of microbial enhanced oil recovery and is rarely used because of its higher cost and because the development is not widely accepted. These microbes function either by partially digesting long hydrocarbon molecules, by generating biosurfactants, or by emitting carbon dioxide (which then functions as described in Gas injection above).

Three approaches have been used to achieve microbial injection. In the first approach, bacterial cultures mixed with a food source (a carbohydrate such as molasses is commonly used) are injected into the oil field. In the second approach, used since 1985, nutrients are injected into the ground to nurture existing microbial bodies; these nutrients cause the bacteria to increase production of the natural surfactants they normally use to metabolize crude oil underground. After the injected nutrients are consumed, the microbes go into near-shutdown mode, their exteriors become hydrophilic, and they migrate to the oil-water interface area, where they cause oil droplets to form from the larger oil mass, making the droplets more likely to migrate to the wellhead. This approach has been used in oilfields near the Four Corners and in the Beverly Hills Oil Field in Beverly Hills, California.

The third approach is used to address the problem of paraffin wax components of the crude oil, which tend to precipitate as the crude flows to the surface, since the Earth's surface is considerably cooler than the petroleum deposits (a temperature drop of 9–10–14 °C per thousand feet of depth is usual).

==== Plasma-pulse ====
In 2013, a technique called plasma-pulse technology was introduced into the United States from Russia. This technique can result in another 50 percent of improvement in existing well production.

== Economic costs and benefits ==
Adding oil recovery methods adds to the cost of oil—in the case of CO_{2} typically between 0.5–8.0 US$ per tonne of CO_{2}. The increased extraction of oil on the other hand, is an economic benefit with the revenue depending on prevailing oil prices. Onshore EOR has paid in the range of a net 10–16 US$ per tonne of CO_{2} injected for oil prices of 15–20 US$/barrel. Prevailing prices depend on many factors but can determine the economic suitability of any procedure, with more procedures and more expensive procedures being economically viable at higher prices. Example: With oil prices at around 90 US$/barrel, the economic benefit is about 70 US$ per tonne CO_{2}. The U.S. Department of Energy estimates that 20 billion tons of captured CO_{2} could produce 67 billion barrels of economically recoverable oil.

From 1986 to 2008, the quote oil production deriving from EOR has increased from 0.3% to 5%, thanks to an increasing oil demand and a reduction of oil supply.

== Environmental impacts ==
Enhanced oil recovery wells typically pump large quantities of produced water to the surface. This water contains brine and may also contain toxic heavy metals and radioactive substances. This can be very damaging to drinking water sources and the environment generally if not properly controlled. Disposal wells are used to prevent surface contamination of soil and water by injecting the produced water deep underground.

=== Greenhouse gas emissions ===
Carbon dioxide can be captured from the flue gas of an industrial facility such as natural gas processing plant or a coal power plant. If captured CO_{2} is used for EOR, the process is known as carbon capture-EOR (CC-EOR) and is a form of carbon capture and storage.

There is controversy over whether carbon capture followed by enhanced oil recovery is beneficial for the climate. The EOR process is energy-intensive because of the need to separate and re-inject CO_{2} multiple times to minimize losses. If CO_{2} losses are kept at 1%, the energy required for EOR operations results in around 0.23 tonnes of CO_{2} emissions per tonne of CO_{2} sequestered.

Furthermore, when the oil that is extracted using EOR is subsequently burned, CO_{2} is released. If these emissions are included in calculations, carbon capture with EOR is usually found to increase overall emissions compared to not using carbon capture at all. If the emissions from burning extracted oil are excluded from calculations, carbon capture with EOR is found to decrease emissions. In arguments for excluding these emissions, it is assumed that oil produced by EOR displaces conventionally produced oil instead of adding to the global consumption of oil. A 2020 review found that scientific papers were roughly evenly split on the question of whether carbon capture with EOR increased or decreased emissions.

The International Energy Agency's model of oil supply and demand indicates that 80% of oil produced in EOR will displace other oil on the market. Using this model, it estimated that for each tonne of CO_{2} sequestered, burning the oil produced by conventional EOR leads to 0.13 tonnes of CO_{2} emissions (in addition to the 0.24 tonnes of CO_{2} emitted during the EOR process itself).

When the CO_{2} used in EOR is sourced from underground CO_{2} deposits, which is usually the case, EOR provides no climate benefit.

== Government programs and regulations ==
=== United States ===
In the US, regulations can both assist and slow down the development of EOR for use in carbon capture & utilization, as well as general oil production.

As a means of boosting domestic oil production, the US federal tax code began to include incentives for EOR in 1979, when crude oil was still under federal price controls. A 15 percent tax credit was codified with the U.S. Federal EOR Tax Incentive in 1986, and oil production from EOR using carbon dioxide (CO_{2}) subsequently grew rapidly.

The 2021 Infrastructure Investment and Jobs Act designates over $3 billion for a variety of CCS demonstration projects. A similar amount is provided for regional CCS hubs that focus on the broader capture, transport, and either storage or use of captured CO_{2}. Hundreds of millions more are dedicated annually to loan guarantees supporting CO_{2} transport infrastructure.

The Inflation Reduction Act of 2022 (IRA) updates tax credit law to encourage the use of carbon capture and storage. Tax incentives under the law provide up to $85/tonne for CO_{2} capture and storage in saline geologic formations or up to $60/tonne for CO_{2} used for enhanced oil recovery. The Internal Revenue Service relies on documentation from the corporation to substantiate claims on how much CO_{2} is being sequestered, and does not perform independent investigations. In 2020, a federal investigation found that claimants for the 45Q tax credit failed to document successful geological storage for nearly $900 million of the $1 billion they had claimed.

One of the primary laws governing EOR is the Safe Drinking Water Act of 1974 (SDWA), which gives most of the regulatory power over EOR and similar oil recovery operations to the U.S. Environmental Protection Agency (EPA). The agency operates an Underground Injection Control (UIC) Program and has issued regulations in order to protect drinking water sources. Enhanced oil recovery wells are regulated as "Class II" wells by the EPA. The regulations require well operators to reinject the brine used for recovery deep underground in Class II disposal wells. EPA has delegated UIC enforcement authority to 34 states and tribal governments. Seven additional states and two tribal governments have limited UIC authority. The EPA collects information from the delegated agencies about individual wells to ensure compliance with UIC regulations and the Clean Air Act, which dictates reporting guidelines for any CO_{2} sequestration operations. Beyond the atmospheric concerns, most of these federal requirements are to ensure that the CO_{2} injection causes no major damage to America's waterways. Overall, the locality of EOR regulation can make EOR projects more difficult, as different standards in different regions can slow down construction and force separate approaches to utilize the same technology.

== See also ==
- List of carbon capture and storage projects
- Gas reinjection
- Steam assisted gravity drainage
- Water injection (oil production)
