= Oxy-fuel combustion process =

Burning of fuel with pure oxygen

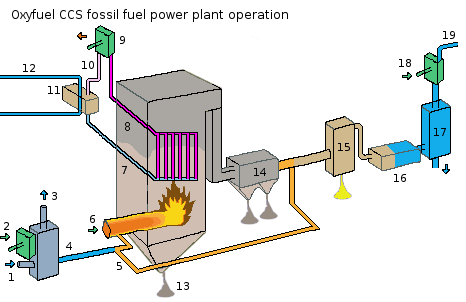
Oxyfuel CCS power plant operation

Oxy-fuel combustion is the process of burning a fuel using pure oxygen, or a mixture of oxygen and recirculated flue gas, instead of air. Since the nitrogen component of air is not heated, fuel consumption is reduced, and higher flame temperatures are possible. Historically, the primary use of oxy-fuel combustion has been in welding and cutting of metals, especially steel, since oxy-fuel allows for higher flame temperatures than can be achieved with an air-fuel flame. It has also received a lot of attention in recent decades as a potential carbon capture and storage technology.

There is currently research being done in firing fossil fuel power plants with an oxygen-enriched gas mix instead of air. Almost all of the nitrogen is removed from input air, yielding a stream that is approximately 95% oxygen. Firing with pure oxygen would result in too high a flame temperature, so the mixture is diluted by mixing with recycled flue gas, or staged combustion. The recycled flue gas can also be used to carry fuel into the boiler and ensure adequate convective heat transfer to all boiler areas. Oxy-fuel combustion produces approximately 75% less flue gas than air fueled combustion and produces exhaust consisting primarily of CO_{2} and H_{2}O (see figure).

== Economy and efficiency ==
The justification for using oxy-fuel is to produce a CO_{2} rich flue gas ready for sequestration. Oxy-fuel combustion has significant advantages over traditional air-fired plants. Among these are:

- The mass and volume of the flue gas are reduced by approximately 75%.
- Because the flue gas volume is reduced, less heat is lost in the flue gas.
- The size of the flue gas treatment equipment can be reduced by 75%.
- The flue gas is primarily CO_{2}, suitable for sequestration.
- The concentration of pollutants in the flue gas is higher, making separation easier.
- Most of the flue gases are condensable; this makes compression separation possible.
- Heat of condensation can be captured and reused rather than lost in the flue gas.
- Because nitrogen from air is absent, nitrogen oxide production is greatly reduced.
- If the fuel contains sulfur, sulfuric acid can possibly be recovered instead of being released as a dangerous environmental pollutant or "lost" in flue gas desulfurization.

Economically speaking this method costs more than a traditional air-fired plant. The main problem has been separating oxygen from the air. This process requires much energy, nearly 15% of production by a coal-fired power station can be consumed for this process. However, a new technology which is not yet practical called chemical looping combustion can be used to reduce this cost. In chemical looping combustion, the oxygen required to burn the coal is produced internally by oxidation and reduction reactions, as opposed to using more expensive methods of generating oxygen by separating it from air.

At present in the absence of any need to reduce CO_{2} emissions, oxy-fuel is not competitive. However, oxy-fuel is a viable alternative to removing CO_{2} from the flue gas from a conventional air-fired fossil fuel plant. However, an oxygen concentrator might be able to help, as it simply removes nitrogen.

In industries other than power generation, oxy-fuel combustion can be competitive due to higher sensible heat availability. Oxy-fuel combustion is common in various aspects of metal production.

The glass industry has been converting to oxy-fuel since the early 1990s because glass furnaces require a temperature of approximately 1500 degrees C, which is not economically attainable at adiabatic flame temperatures for air-fuel combustion unless heat is regenerated between the flue stream and the incoming air stream. Developed in the mid-19th century, glass furnace regenerators are large and expensive high temperature brick ducts filled with brick arranged in a checkerboard pattern to capture heat as flue gas exits the furnace. When the flue duct is thoroughly heated, air flow is reversed and the flue duct becomes the air inlet, releasing its heat into the incoming air, and allowing for higher furnace temperatures than can be attained with air-fuel only. Two sets of regenerative flue ducts allowed for the air flow to be reversed at regular intervals, and thus maintain a high temperature in the incoming air. By allowing new furnaces to be built without the expense of regenerators, and especially with the added benefit of nitrogen oxide reduction, which allows glass plants to meet emission restrictions, oxy-fuel is cost effective without the need to reduce CO_{2} emissions. Oxy-fuel combustion also reduces CO_{2} release at the glass plant location, although this may be offset by CO_{2} production due to electric power generation which is necessary to produce oxygen for the combustion process.

Oxy-fuel combustion may also be cost effective in the incineration of low BTU value hazardous waste fuels. It is often combined with staged combustion for nitrogen oxide reduction, since pure oxygen can stabilize combustion characteristics of a flame.

== Pilot plants ==
There are pilot plants that underwent initial proof-of-concept testing to evaluate the technologies for scaling up to commercial plants, including

- Callide A Power Station in Queensland, Australia
- Schwarze Pumpe Power Station in Spremberg, Germany
- CIUDEN in Cubillos del Sil, Spain
- NET Power Demonstration Facility in La Porte, Texas, USA

=== White Rose plant ===
One case study of oxy-fuel combustion is the attempted White Rose plant in North Yorkshire, United Kingdom. The planned project was an oxy-fuel power plant coupled with air separation to capture two million tons of carbon dioxide per year. The carbon dioxide would then be delivered by pipeline to be sequestered in a saline aquifer beneath the North Sea. However, in late 2015 and early 2016, following withdrawal of funding by the Drax Group and the U.K. government, construction was halted. The unforeseen loss of the funding from the UK government's CCS Commercialisation Programme, along with decreased subsidies for renewable energy, left the White Rose Plant with insufficient funds to continue development.

== Environmental impact ==
One of the major environmental impacts of burning fossil fuels is the release of CO_{2}, which contributes to climate change. Because oxyfuel combustion results in flue gas that already has a high concentration of CO_{2}, it makes it easier to purify and store the CO_{2} rather than releasing it to the atmosphere.

Many fossil fuels, such as coal and oil shale, produce ash as a result of combustion. This ash also needs to be disposed of, which may impact the environment. So far studies indicate that, in general, oxyfuel combustion does not significantly affect the composition of ash produced. Measurements have shown similar mineral and heavy metal concentrations regardless of whether an air or oxyfuel environment was used. However, one notable exception is that oxyfuel ashes often have lower concentrations of calcium oxide or calcium hydroxide (free lime). Free lime forms when carbonate minerals in fuels like coal and oil shale decompose at the high temperatures occurring during combustion (calcination). Calcination is an equilibrium reaction and a higher partial pressure of CO_{2} shifts the equilibrium in favor of CaCO_{3} and MgCO_{3} respectively. Free lime is reactive and can potentially affect the environment, for instance by increasing the alkalinity of the ash. Because oxyfuel combustion takes place in a CO_{2}-rich atmosphere, decomposition is reduced and the ash generally contains less free lime. Flue gas desulfurization is usually employed to increase the pH of flue gases or their product when reacting with atmospheric moisture (acid rain). Besides sulfur and its oxides, another potential acid rain component is formed from nitric and nitrous oxide interacting with water - eliminating nitrogen from combustion reduces this factor altogether.

== See also ==
- Air separation
- Cryogenic energy storage
- Premixed flame
- Chemical looping combustion
- Carbon capture and storage
