= Carbon Sequestration Leadership Forum =

International initiative

Coordinates: 38°53′13.4″N 77°1′33″W

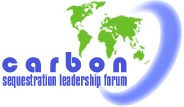
CSLF logo.

The Carbon Sequestration Leadership Forum (CSLF) is an international initiative to advance carbon capture and storage (CCS) technology. The Forum is a Ministerial-level organization that includes 23 member countries and the European Commission. Membership is open to national governmental entities that are significant producers or users of fossil fuel and that have a commitment to invest resources in research, development and demonstration activities in carbon dioxide capture and storage technologies. CSLF also recognizes that stakeholders, those organizations that are affected by and can affect the goals of CSLF, form an essential component of CSLF activities.

The CSLF Charter, signed in June 2003, organized the CSLF by creating a Policy Group, which governs the overall framework and policies of the CSLF, a Technical Group, which reviews the progress of collaborative projects and makes recommendations to the Policy Group on any needed actions, and an administrative Secretariat, which organizes CSLF meetings, coordinates communications among CSLF Members, and acts as a clearinghouse of information.

In July 2005, the G8 Summit endorsed the CSLF in its Plan of Action on Climate Change, Clean Energy and Sustainable Development, and identified it as a medium of cooperation and collaboration with key developing countries in dealing with greenhouse gases.

Similar designations were also made in bilateral activities that include:

1. the joint statement of the U.S.-European Union Summit on Energy Security, Energy Efficiency, Renewables and Economic Development, and
2. the Mainz Declaration of Germany and the United States on Cleaner and More Efficient Energy, Development and Climate Change.

In 2006 and 2007, the International Energy Agency and the CSLF held a series of three workshops for invited experts from around the world on the topic of near-term opportunities for carbon capture and storage. Resulting recommendations from these workshops were formally adopted by the CSLF and were sent forward to G8 leaders.

The CSLF has recognized 30 carbon capture and storage projects worldwide that demonstrate a wide range of CO_{2} capture, transport and storage research and activities.

== See also ==
- Climate change
- Global warming
