= Fred Levin =

American lawyer (1937–2021)

Fredric G. Levin
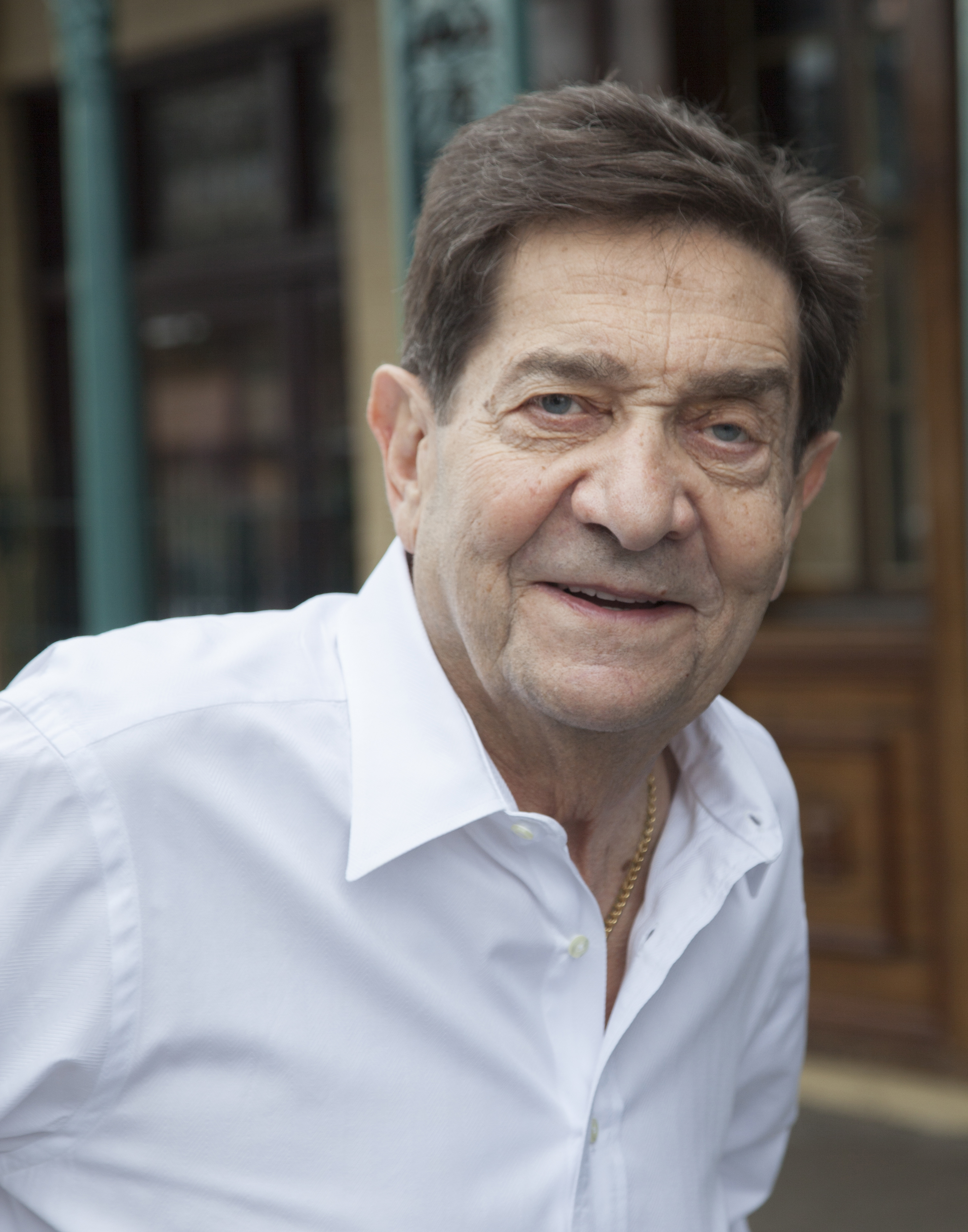
- Born: Fredric Gerson Levin; March 29, 1937; Pensacola, Florida, U.S.
- Died: January 12, 2021 (aged 83); Pensacola, Florida, U.S.
- Education: University of Florida
- Occupations: Attorney, boxing manager
- Known for: Rewriting Florida's Medicaid Third-Party Recovery Act allowing the state of Florida to sue the tobacco industry; benefactor of the University of Florida Levin College of Law, manager of Roy Jones Jr., philanthropy
- Spouse: Marilyn Kapner Levin (1959–2011) (deceased)
- Children: 4

Fredric Gerson Levin (March 29, 1937 – January 12, 2021) was an American plaintiffs' lawyer who served as chairman of Levin, Papantonio, Rafferty, Proctor, Buchanan, O'Brien, Barr, Mougey, P.A., a law firm in Northwest Florida. The Fredric G. Levin College of Law at the University of Florida is named for him because of a monetary donation he made to the school in 1999.

He was best known for rewriting Florida's Medicaid Third-Party Recovery Act to allow the State of Florida to sue and recover billions of dollars from the tobacco industry for smoking-related illnesses. His flamboyant and brazen personality resulted in him being prosecuted by the Florida Bar two times, and investigated two additional times.

Levin's life was summarized in the weekly medical journal The Lancet. In its December 2014 edition, the author wrote: "And Give Up Showbiz? explores the extraordinary life of a pioneering and often controversial lawyer. Seen as an inspiring innovator by some, and a flamboyant self-promoter by others, Levin's work was not always met with a favourable outcome. Levin was accused of two murders, and often met with controversy because of his relentless fight for justice against big companies. His home life, while loving, was often neglected in his pursuit of business, and this is mentioned several times in the book—bringing a sense of balance to the stories."

== Personal life ==
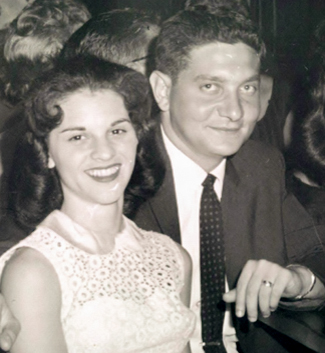
Marilyn and Fred – 1967

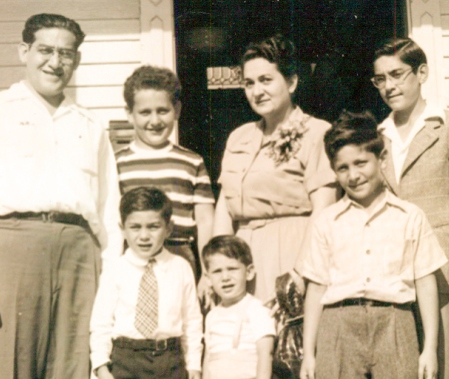
Fred Levin (bottom right), with his parents and brothers in 1950

Levin was born in 1937, in Pensacola, Florida. He grew up in a conservative Jewish household, with his mother (Rose), father (Abe), and brothers (David, Herman, Stanley, Martin, and Allen). His father was a pawnbroker catering to the large military presence in the Pensacola area, and also ran the concessions at the Pensacola Greyhound Park and at a store on Pensacola Beach. Levin attended the University of Florida in Gainesville, Florida, as an undergraduate, but did not do well academically. Instead, he was known as a drinker, smoker, and gambler. He was a member of Pi Lambda Phi, one of two Jewish fraternities on campus. While attending the University of Florida, Levin met his future wife, Marilyn, who was a member of the Jewish sorority Alpha Epsilon Phi. The Levins were married for 51 years, when Marilyn died on February 6, 2011, survived by their four children, seven grandchildren, and one great-grandchild.

Levin began law studies in 1958, as a student enrolled in the College of Law at the University of Florida. This was mostly due to his reluctance to leave behind the college party lifestyle, as well as the fact that his older brother David had established a small law firm where Levin could work. He attended summer classes to raise his Grade Point Average for law school admission, as his grade scores were below the required minimum 2.0 G.P.A. (Note: In 1958, virtually any white male could gain admittance to Florida public law school, where approximately one-third would graduate.)

In Levin's first few weeks of law school, he received word that his brother Martin was rapidly succumbing to late stage leukemia, and his death was imminent. Levin approached the dean of the law school, asking for time off from school to attend his brother's funeral. The dean looked at Levin's undergraduate course records, said that he could take the days off, and added that he needn't return to school, as he doubted Levin would make it through law school successfully.

Levin drove from Gainesville to Pensacola, but Martin died before he arrived at his brother's bedside in Pensacola. Ignoring his dean's advice, Levin returned to law school where he thrived, finishing third in his class. Post-graduation, his plans were to go back to Pensacola, spend one year in practice with his brother David's law firm, and then go back to college to pursue a Master's degree in tax law. At that point, he had never considered or intended on working as a trial lawyer, as he was terrified by public speaking.

On January 12, 2021, Levin died from COVID-19 complications.

== Legal career ==
In 1961, Levin began practicing in the law firm of Levin & Askew (now known as Levin Papantonio) in Pensacola. The firm was founded by his brother David and Reubin Askew, who eventually would go on to become a two-term governor of Florida and candidate for President of the United States.

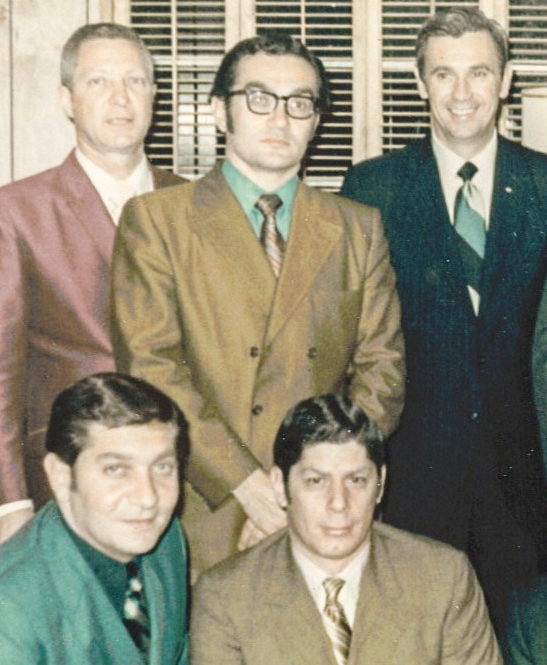
Fred Levin and a few partners in the late 1960s. David Levin (top, middle), Reubin Askew (top right), and Fred Levin (bottom left).

Levin began his legal career in family law, but once a client explained that her husband said he would kill her divorce lawyer, he chose to switch to general civil law. His first case involved an insurance dispute over a residential fire claim. The case ended up before a jury. Levin won the case and decided he wanted to become a trial lawyer.

In the late 1960s, Levin handled a case involving the wrongful death of a child who had taken the antibiotic Chloromycetin. Levin won the case. While the compensatory damages were not large, the judge allowed Levin to pursue a punitive damage claim which ended up playing a role in the drug being pulled from the market in the United States for most uses.

Levin received national attention with the case of Thorshov v. L&N. On November 9, 1977, Dr. Jon Thorshov, a thirty-eight-year-old physician, his wife, his four-year-old daughter, and his one-year-old son were at their home in Pensacola when a freight train operated by L&N derailed near their home and released anhydrous ammonia. The family attempted to escape their home, but were overcome by the fumes. Dr. and Ms. Thorshov died, and both children sustained serious physical injuries. In 1980, Levin received a jury verdict for the family in the amount of $18 million. As a result of the verdict, Us magazine did a story on Levin in its swimsuit preview issue. On the cover were Randi Oakes from CHiPs, Morgan Fairchild from Flamingo Road, and Donna Mills from Knots Landing. Inside was a half-page picture of Levin standing in front of an L&N railcar under the headline, "I'll Sue".

Levin received more than thirty jury verdicts in excess of $1,000,000 (six in excess of $10,000,000). At various points in his career he held the national record for jury verdicts involving the wrongful death of a child, the wrongful death of a housewife, the wrongful death of a wage earner, and the largest personal injury verdict in the state of Florida. He was listed in every edition of Best Lawyers in America; was a member of the Inner Circle of Advocates; and was inducted into the National Trial Lawyers Hall of Fame in 2009.

== Tobacco litigation ==
Levin played a significant role in the litigation brought by numerous states against the tobacco industry during the 1990s. Levin was at a trial lawyer conference when another attorney saw Levin drinking whiskey and smoking a cigarette. The attorney told Levin that smoking was going to kill him, and that he was working with the State of Mississippi to sue the tobacco industry for compensation for all the money Mississippi was spending in Medicaid dollars treating smoking related illnesses. Levin did not believe the legal theory would be successful, explaining that the tobacco industry had never paid a penny to anyone as a result of smoking injuries.

Levin returned to Pensacola and thought about the potential case, and went to the Florida statute allowing the state of Florida to recover against individuals and companies that harm someone where the State has to pay Medicaid. Levin thought that with a few changes in the statute's language, he could rewrite the law so that the State could sue the tobacco industry without the tobacco industry being able to raise the numerous defenses it had relied upon in winning the cases against it.

Levin made the changes, and then approached a good friend who was the dean of the Florida Senate. The two then went to the Governor of Florida, who supported the concept. The dean of the Senate was able to get the law passed on the last day of session and at the last minute. The Senator made it part of another law that received unanimous support in the Senate, and Levin's amendments passed. When the tobacco industry discovered the true intent of the law, it began donating money to Florida senators to repeal the statute. The Senate voted to repeal it, but the Governor vetoed the repeal. The Senate then came within one vote of overriding the Governor's veto, but could not, and the law stood.

After the passage of the law, John French, a lobbyist for Philip Morris USA, stated, "This is probably the single biggest issue to ever have been run through in the dead of the night." John Shebel, president of the pro-business organization Associated Industries of Florida, told the Orlando Sun-Sentinel, "This law is probably one of the worst laws ever passed by any Legislature." Walker Merryman, vice president of the Tobacco Institute, said, "It's certainly creative, and it demonstrates how a government will try to impose a significant financial burden on one portion of the economy."

Gannett News Service wrote: "What they engineered was a first-of-its-kind bill making it much easier for the state to recoup money it spends for treating cancer patients and others with smoking-related diseases. ... Its created such an uproar in Tallahassee that tobacco companies have pledged millions of dollars to fight the bill either by getting it vetoed or using the upcoming special session on health care to change or eliminate it."

"I could say, I think without exaggerating, that the financial life of the tobacco industry is riding on [the veto of the bill]", said John Banahaf, executive director of Action on Smoking and Health. Professor Richard Daynard of Northeastern University called the bill: "the single biggest blow against the tobacco industry and for the public health that's ever been done in the United states."

Challenges to the law made it the United States Supreme Court, but was upheld. Immediately after jury selection, the tobacco industry settled with the State of Florida for a record $13 billion. Levin's law firm would end up earning a fee of more than $300 million. Soon thereafter, Levin appeared on ABC's 20/20 talking to reporter John Stossel. While interviewing him for the piece, Levin lit up a cigarette, which ABC highlighted in the segment. Next, he appeared on two full pages of George magazine, standing on his putting green in a tuxedo, drinking Crown Royal whiskey and smoking a cigarette. He was then highlighted in a Time article entitled: "Are Lawyers Running America?"

== Florida Bar ==
Levin had a lengthy and hostile relationship with the Florida Bar whom he often and openly referred to as "lily-white elitists, country club, men". He has been prosecuted by the Florida Bar on two occasions, and formally investigated on another two occasions. In the first investigation, Levin stated on his primetime, live, call-in, television show that doctors have "this God-complex--they think they are above the law." The investigation did not result in bar charges. In the second investigation, and first prosecution, Levin admitted on his television show to gambling on football games, and said he found nothing wrong with it. He mocked law enforcement for arresting and prosecuting local bookies, as if they were an elite swat team fighting terrorism. He commented that the local law enforcement and prosecutors wouldn't have the guts to go down to the high crime streets in Pensacola to arrest drug dealers and rapists because they would be scared to get shot. The Florida Bar charged Levin with ethics violation as he was admitting to violations of Florida law, and demeaning the legal profession. Levin was found guilty and a public reprimand was recommended. Levin challenged the decision to the United States Supreme Court, but in the end he received his public reprimand.

The third investigation, and second prosecution, involved Levin's use of the word "ridiculous" to describe the defense in two separate civil cases. Levin won both cases and received large jury verdicts, but both verdicts were taken away on appeal because the appellate court believed Levin inflamed the jury by calling the defense ridiculous. The Florida Bar then brought charges against Levin alleging that his closing argument violated ethics rules because he was stating his personal opinion. This was the first time in U.S. history that a lawyer was charged by a bar disciplinary committee in a situation such as this. This time Levin was found innocent.

The fourth investigation occurred when a friend of Levin's, the Senator who passed the tobacco legislation, was being prosecuted for violations of the Florida Sunshine Law. The key witness against the Senator (who now was a county commissioner) was another local county commissioner who claimed the now former Senator offered him a bribe to pass an item before him. When the former Senator was convicted of violation of the Sunshine Law, Levin made comments to the press calling the witness a "rat fink". He then told the Pensacola News Journal, "If [the witness] was on the Titanic, he would dress like a woman and jump on the first lifeboat." Levin called the judge's ruling not to free the politician while he appealed "unconscionable". He also assailed the judge. "I have never been so embarrassed or ashamed of the legal profession", he told the paper. "I believe the inmates have taken over the asylum." Asked what exactly he meant, Levin replied, "That means the nuts are in charge."

Levin's comments led to an ethics complaint being filed against Levin with the Florida Bar—the third in his career. Months later, the Florida Bar's grievance committee ruled there was no cause to pursue a full investigation into the matter. However, the Florida Bar sent Levin a "letter of advice" as to how to act in the future. The letter said: "While your conduct in this instance does not warrant formal discipline, the committee believes that it was not consistent with the high standards of our profession. The committee hopes that this letter will make you more aware of your obligation to uphold these professional standards, and that you will adjust your conduct accordingly."

== Death of Jake Horton ==
On April 10, 1989, at approximately 1:00 p.m. C.S.T., a twin-engine Beechcraft King Air 200 crashed within minutes of takeoff from Pensacola Regional Airport, killing the two pilots and the single passenger, Jacob F. "Jake" Horton. The plane was owned by Southern Company, an American electric utility holding company headquartered in Atlanta, Georgia. The company is currently the 16th largest utility company in the world, and the fourth largest in the U.S.

Jake was a senior vice-president at Gulf Power Company, a subsidiary of Southern Company. The cause of the plane crash has never been solved, with theories including pilot error, poor maintenance, sabotage, and suicide. Levin became embroiled in the incident because he was one of the last people to speak with Jake, and he also was legal counsel for Gulf Power.

In the months before the plane crash, Southern Company was under a federal grand jury investigation for possible tax evasion and inappropriate political contributions. Gulf Power and Jake were at the center of the investigation, with Southern Company claiming that Jake was the primary responsible party. Between 9:30 a.m. and 11:15 a.m. C.S.T. on April 10, 1989, Jake met privately with Levin in his office. Levin's law firm had been serving as private counsel for Gulf Power for many years, and Levin also was a close personal friend of Jake. Southern Company wanted Levin to convince Jake to resign, but Jake wished to remain employed and clear his name. Prior to leaving Levin's office, Jake ordered a corporate plane to take him from Pensacola to Atlanta where he wished to meet with the president of Southern Company. Jake boarded the plane approximately 1.5 hours later, and within minutes the plane crashed, killing all on board. Within three hours after the crash, the Escambia County Sheriff's Office received an anonymous call stating: "You can stop investigating Gulf Power now. We took care of that." Within two weeks of the plane crash, and in protest to Southern Company blaming Jake, Levin quit as counsel for Gulf Power.

Over the next year, the federal grand jury investigation continued, and Levin eventually was called to testify. Southern Company took the position that Levin was not permitted to testify because his knowledge was subject to attorney–client privilege. Southern Company finally agreed to allow Levin to testify, but only on the limited subject of his conversation with Jake on the morning of the plane crash. Southern Company would not permit Levin to talk to the National Transportation Safety Board or the Escambia County Sheriff's Office.

In the days before Levin was scheduled to testify, someone began leaving parakeets at his home and office with their necks broken. Also, someone called the FBI stating that Levin would be killed if he were to testify. Levin testified with U.S. Marshals escorting him to and from the hearing.

Despite numerous federal and state investigations, and multiple lawsuits, the cause of the plane crash has never been solved. Gulf Power ended up pleading guilty to illegal political contributions and other violations, and paid a $500,000 fine. Gulf Power blamed Horton for the illegal events.

== Career in boxing ==
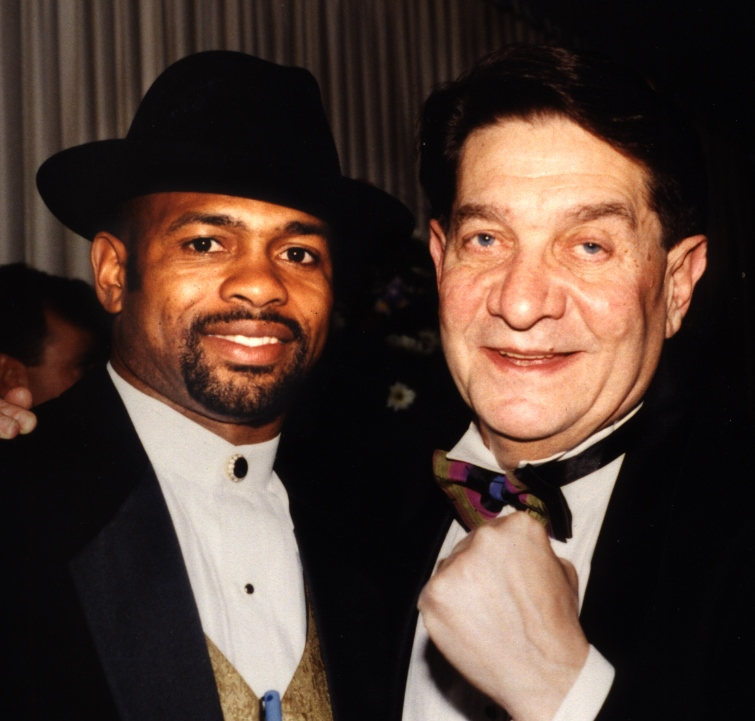
Roy Jones Jr. & Fred Levin

In 1989, Levin began managing the boxing career of Roy Jones Jr., who had just returned from Seoul, Korea, having earned a silver medal in the 1988 Olympic Games. The fact that Roy did not win the gold medal became an international issue after it was discovered that three of the judges had been subject to inappropriate contact, and yet awarded the gold medal to Roy's opponent or ruled it a draw. Roy had dominated his opponent (Park Si-hun), landing almost three times as many punches. Although the three judges were suspended, with two being banned for life, Roy was not awarded the gold medal. He was, however, awarded the outstanding competitor in the games by the International Amateur Boxing Association.

The fact that Levin was chosen to help manage Roy's career was controversial considering he had no experience in the boxing business. Roy had been courted by some of the biggest names in boxing, including Don King and Sugar Ray Leonard. Roy's father, Roy Jones Sr., chose Levin to manage his son's career because Jones Sr. no longer trusted the boxing establishment after the Olympic decision. Jones Sr. once stated: "The boxing biz has stolen the medal from my son."

Levin negotiated a middleweight championship fight for Roy against James Toney. Roy won the fight, and then earned a multimillion-dollar long-term contract with HBO. Levin received the 1995 Al Buck Award from the Boxing Writers Association of America as boxing manager of the year; and received the Rocky Marciano Foundation President's Award in 2001.

Levin managed Roy's boxing career from 1989 to 2003. Levin's last fight with Roy involved heavyweight champion John Ruiz on March 1, 2003. Ruiz had recently defeated Evander Holyfield for the championship. Jones officially weighed in at 193 pounds to Ruiz's 226 pounds. Jones won by unanimous decision, becoming the first former middleweight title holder to win a heavyweight title in 106 years, the last being Bob Fitzsimmons in 1896. Jones also became the first fighter in history to start his career as a junior middleweight and become a heavyweight champion.

== Fighting racial injustice ==
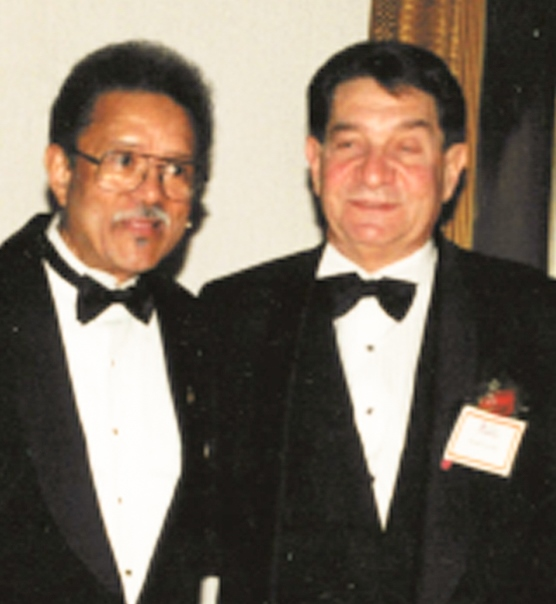
George Starke and Fred Levin at the law school naming

When Levin entered the University of Florida College of Law in 1958, George Starke, the first African American student to enter a public institution in the state of Florida, entered with Levin's class. Levin described the first day as follows: "They had all of us on one side of the auditorium and he was all by himself, except for all the Secret Service people. Up to that point, I had not thought much about racial issues. I looked over and my heart went out to him. Here were 350 white law students and this one black guy. He was dressed in a suit, and the rest of us were dressed like bums. They started shuffling him, which is rubbing your feet together on the floor like they do in prison. ... I always studied in the library, and I would look across at George because he always had to sit at a table by himself and everybody would shuffle their feet. It just tore me up. I wanted to go over and sit with him, but I didn't have the guts."

After the first semester of law school, Levin approached George to become his study partner. The two remained friends for the next two years. Although Levin ended up graduating number three out of his graduating class, George failed to graduate.

In an oral history interview conducted by Samuel Proctor at the University of Florida, Levin described the final events leading to George leaving the University of Florida. "We were going to study for the exam the next day, I told him to meet me at my apartment. I was running a little late, and I got there, and he's sitting on the steps, we were an upstairs apartment. I said, 'Why didn't you go on in?' He said, 'You don't understand, a colored man doesn't go into an apartment where a white woman is.' I said, 'Oh the hell with it, come on.' So we came in, Marilyn cooked supper for us, and we studied all night long. I had these little flip cards that worked real well. All night long. He goes home, and I clean up and go to the exam, and he never shows up. He had gone home just to lay down for a second [snap of fingers], slept through the exam. They wouldn't give him another exam, they flunked him."

When the law school was renamed to the Fredric G. Levin College of Law in 1999, George attended in support of Levin.

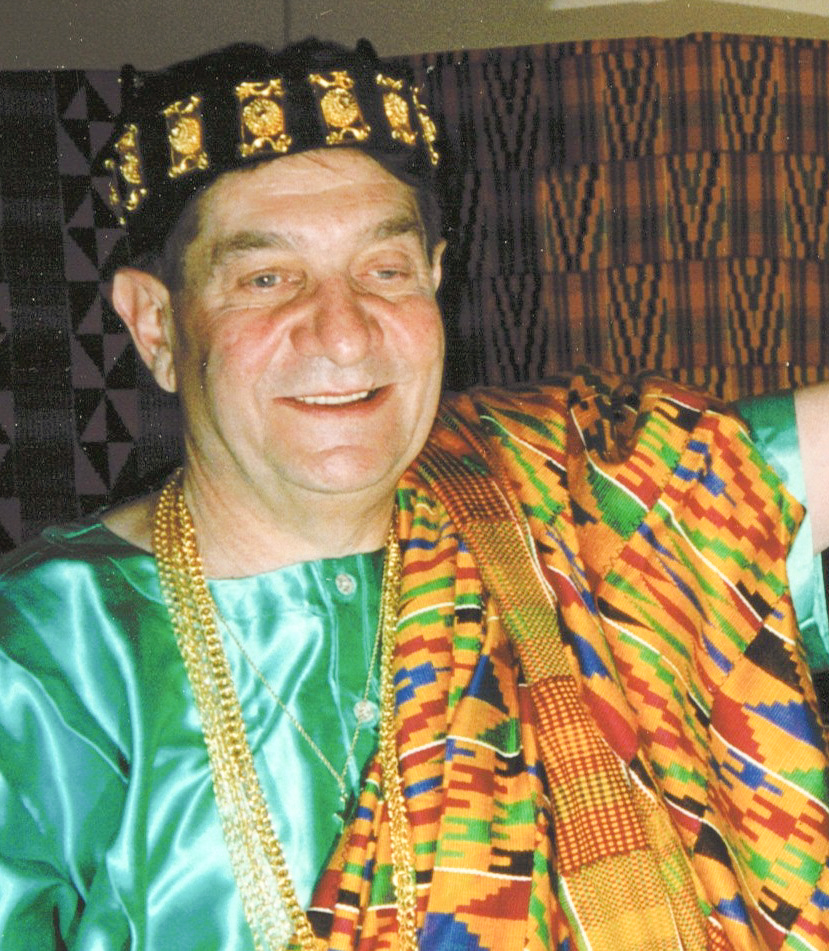
Fred Levin being inducted as a chief of Ghana

Shortly after becoming a lawyer in Pensacola, Levin nominated Nathaniel Dedmond to be the first African American as a member of the Escambia-Santa Rosa Counties Bar Association. Several lawyers in the association were offended by the nomination and had their wives call Marilyn, Levin's wife. They asked Marilyn how she would like to be sitting next to Nathaniel Dedmond's wife at a bar meeting. They were hoping to get Marilyn to go to Fred and have him drop the nomination. Instead, Marilyn replied: "Oh, yes, that will be fine." Levin commented that he had never been more proud of Marilyn. When the nomination came up for vote, the association voted against Levin's nomination.

In 1999, Levin received recognition for his support of the African American community by being named a chief of the country of Ghana, and receiving a citation from the U.S. Congressional Black Caucus; which provides in part: "We of the Congressional Black Caucus wish to join with the distinguished world citizens and other leaders in congratulating you on your designation as a Ghanaian Chief. But more specifically, we wish to honor your lifelong contributions to bettering the lives of the people of Ghana and the people of America. Long before we became aware of your outstanding contributions in Africa, we knew of your work as a lawyer fighting on the side of underprivileged people in America. We thank you for that rich legacy. We are proud that the world community is now beginning to recognize your valuable service to it as well."

== Awards and honors ==
Levin received the Perry Nichols Award in 1994, which is the highest honor bestowed by the Florida Justice Association, and is given in recognition of a person's lifetime achievements in the pursuit of justice.

For the year 1999, The National Law Journal named Levin as the top civil litigator in Florida. This honor encompassed plaintiff and defense counsel. Levin also was named in the October 4, 1999, edition of The National Law Journal as one of the "Top Ten Litigators for 1999", which again included both plaintiff and defense counsel.

In 1999, Levin was honored at the United Nations by being made a chief in the Republic of Ghana. This honor was bestowed on Levin because of his lifetime of dedication to equal justice for people of all races. At the same time, Levin received a citation honoring him by the United States Congressional Black Caucus.

Levin was a member of the Inner Circle of Advocates, an organization limited to 100 of the top trial attorneys in the country, and has been listed in every edition of the publication Best Lawyers in America. In 2009, he was inducted into The National Trial Lawyers Hall of Fame. In 2016, Levin was named Trial Lawyer of the Year by The National Trial Lawyers.

In December 2017, Levin was awarded an Honorary Doctor of Laws from University of West Florida.

== Later career ==
At the age of 80, Levin continued to practice law. "I want the practice of law to continue", he said. "I want there to be lawyers. Less and less people are going to law school now. In 2013, applications to accredited law schools dropped for a third consecutive year. My son, Martin, left the practice of law because of its transformation from the personal--a lawyer representing one client--to a business where a lawyer represents thousands of clients in mass tort or class action." Despite his opposition to mass torts, Levin agreed to transfer his law firm's primary practice to this niche area of law. The firm now runs Mass Torts Made Perfect, a conference held twice a year, usually in Las Vegas, to bring together mass tort lawyers from across the country.

In 2013, when he was 76, he won a $3.4 million jury verdict in an ATV case. In 2014, at the age of 77, he won a $12.6 million jury verdict in an automobile accident case. In 2016 (age 79), he was named national Trial Lawyer of the Year.

== Charitable work ==
In 1995, Levin gave a professorship at the University of West Florida, in honor of his father.

In 1998, Levin gave the University of Florida law school $10 million, the second largest cash donation ever given to a public law school as of that time. In 1999, the law school name was officially changed to the University of Florida Fredric G. Levin College of Law.

In 1998, Levin contributed $2 million to the Levin & Papantonio Family Foundation.

In 2006, Levin gave the University of Florida law school $2 million to help fund the Martin H. Levin Advocacy Center.

In 2013, Levin gave $1 million in memory of his recently deceased wife to the Lubavitch-Chabad Student and Community Center at the University of Florida.

In 2015, Levin (along with his sister-in-law Teri) gave $1 million to the YMCA of Northwest Florida to support the construction of its new facility in downtown Pensacola.

In 2016, Levin gave $1 million to the Florida Institute for Human and Machine Cognition to help fund the institute's 30,000 square foot research facility in artificial intelligence, robotics, human-centered computing, agile and distributed computing, and many related areas.

In 2017, Levin gave $550,000 to the University of West Florida to establish the Reubin O'D. Askew Institute for Multidisciplinary Studies.

In 2017, Levin gave $2 million to the Brigham & Women's Hospital to establish the Fredric G. Levin Distinguished Chair in Thoracic Surgery and Lung Cancer Research. The gift was given in honor of Dr. Raphael Bueno for saving Mr. Levin's life after he was diagnosed with stage 4 lung cancer.

In 2018, Levin gave an $8 million home, including its personal belongings, to the University of West Florida. In honor of the gift, the school named its government department the Reubin O'D. Askew Department of Government, after Levin's former law partner and two-term governor of the state of Florida.

In 2019, Levin gave 300,000 shares of Charlotte's Web Holdings, LLC stock to the University of Florida Levin College of Law. At the time of the announcement of the donation, the stock was valued at $6 million.

In 2019, Levin donated $2 million to Dana–Farber Cancer Institute to establish the Fredric G. Levin Endowment in Translational Cancer Research.

In 2021, Levin donated an additional $40 million to the University of Florida Levin College of Law through his estate.

== Levin College of Law ==
The Fredric G. Levin College of Law at the University of Florida is named for him because of a $10 million cash donation he made to the school in 1999. The gift was the largest-ever cash donation to the University of Florida; the second-largest gift ever to a public law school when matched with state funds; and more than three times larger than any gift in the college's 90-year history. The naming drew statewide attention because of the vehement criticism of having the state's prestigious law school named after a person many thought to be reprehensible and undeserving.

One letter to the then dean of the law school read: "I have no problem with naming the law school in honor of an appropriate person, as other colleges have done, but naming our college after Fred Levin does no honor to him, to the institution, or its constituency, and demeans the efforts of the many deans, faculty, and alumni who have worked for so many years to achieve the vision of making our college one of the top twenty law schools. ... You degraded the image and prestige of the University of Florida College of Law by selling its good name to Fred Levin, a lawyer who has been castigated by the courts for abusing the rules, and is notorious for commercializing the practice, thumbing his nose at the bar, and otherwise manipulating the system." In response, Levin told the press: "Two hundred years from now the great, great, great grandchildren (of my critics) will be getting their law degrees from a school with my name on it. It's a good feeling." "It makes me feel great, when their great-grandchildren go up to that stage to get the law degree, they'll know that, dadgum it, that Jew's name is up there on the damn diploma. It's just gotta eat at them."

In 2024, the law school gave an award to a student paper arguing that "We the People" in the US Constitution protects only white people, calling for the removal of voting rights for non-white people, and contending that white people "cannot be expected to meekly swallow this demographic assault on their sovereignty." The author of the paper has publicly called for Jews to be "abolished by any means necessary." The law school's interim dean, Merritt McAlister, defended the decision to honor the student with the award.

== Health issues and death ==
In January 2016, Levin was diagnosed with stage 4 lung cancer that had metastasized to his brain. The brain tumor was removed at the University of Florida Health, and he was treated for his lung cancer at Dana–Farber Cancer Institute and Brigham and Women's Hospital.

Levin died from COVID-19 on January 12, 2021, after surviving stage 4 lung and brain cancer. He was asymptomatic for 10 days and died within 5 days of experiencing any symptoms. He was 83 years old.

== Publications ==
- Operations and the Rule Against Perpetuities, 13 Fla. L. Rev. 214 (1960–1961)
- Wrongful Death and Florida's '10–20' Liability Policy -- The Twilight Zone, 13 Fla. L. Rev. 377 (1960-1961)
- A Trial Lawyers look at No-Fault, 1 Miss. College L. Rev. 271 (1979)
- Personal Injury Protection Coverage, Florida No-Fault Ins. Prac. (2d ed. 1979)
- Attorney's Fees, Florida Civil Practice (2d ed. 1980)
- Visiting Florida's No-Fault Experience: Is it Now Constitutional?, 54 Fla. Bar. J. 2 (1980)
- Structured Settlements in Review: A Case Study, The Am. J. of Trial Advocacy Vol. 4, No. 3, pg. 579 (Spring 1981)
- Effective Opening Statements: The Attorney's Master Key to Courtroom Victory (1983)
- The Trial Masters, Strategy for Opening Statement: A Case Study pp. 158–196 (1984)
- The Art of Cross-Examination: A Case Study, 9 Trial Diplomacy J. 1 (1986)
- Plaintiff's Trial Strategy, Periodic Payment Judgment (1987)
- The Winning Attitude, 2 Trial Practice News Letter 4 (1988)
- A Plaintiff's Guide to Effective Opening Statements, 9 Verdicts, Settlements & Tactics (Sept. 1989)
- Opening Statement, Fla. Civil Trial Prac. (4th ed. 1990)
- Opening Statement, Florida Civil Trial Practice Ch. 8 (5th ed. 1998)
- Closing Arguments, The Last Battle (2003)
