= Plant Daniel =

Fossil fuel power plant in Mississippi, U.S.

Victor J. Daniel Electric Generating Plant
- Country: United States
- Location: Jackson County, near Escatawpa, Mississippi
- Coordinates: 30°31′48″N 88°33′22″W
- Status: Operational
- Commission date: Unit 1 (coal): Sept. 1977; Unit 2 (coal): June, 1981; Units 3, 4 (gas): Apr/May, 2001
- Owners: Mississippi Power, Florida Power & Light

Thermal power station
- Primary fuel: Bituminous coal, natural gas
- Turbine technology: Steam turbine
- Cooling source: Artificial lake
- Combined cycle?: Units 3, 4

Power generation
- Nameplate capacity: 2.09 GWe (1.07 GWe from coal)

The Victor J. Daniel Electric Generating Plant is a major 2-gigawatt, four-unit fossil fuel power plant, generating about 1 GWe from two coal-fired subcritical drum-type units and 1 GWe from its two newer, gas-fired combined-cycle units. Plant Daniel is located in Jackson County, near Escatawpa, Mississippi. Named for Victor J. Daniel Jr., Mississippi Power's fourth president, the plant was designated by Southern Company Services, Inc. Jointly owned by Mississippi Power and Florida Power & Light (FPL), it is the largest generator of electric power in the state of Mississippi.

== History ==
Construction of Daniel 1 and 2, two coal-fired sub-critical drum type units began in April 1973. Twenty-six years later in May 1999, plant capacity was doubled with the addition of two gas-fired combined cycle units, designated Daniel 3 and 4.

The first 500 MW coal-fired, steam electric generating unit, Daniel 1, began commercial operation on Sept. 6, 1977. The second 500 MW coal-fired, steam electric generating unit, Daniel 2, began commercial operation on June 1, 1981.

Daniel 3 and 4 began commercial operation between April and May 2001.

== Ownership ==
Mississippi Power and FPL jointly own and share operating costs of the Daniel 1 and 2 units. FPL's share was originally owned by Gulf Power Company, a former sister company of Mississippi Power through Southern Company. Gulf Power was acquired by FPL's parent NextEra Energy in 2019, with the Gulf Power name retired and replaced with FPL's in 2022.

Daniel 3 and 4 are gas-fired combined cycle units. Each unit produces 500 MW of electricity, bringing the plant's total capacity to more than 2000 MW. Daniel 3 and 4 are solely operated and maintained by Mississippi Power.

== Carbon sequestration demonstration ==
The facility is the site of a United States Department of Energy-sponsored carbon dioxide sequestration demonstration project intended to demonstrate CO_{2} storage in a deep saline aquifer, the Lower Tuscaloosa Formation. The project began in 2008, and more than 3,000 short tons (2,700 t) of CO_{2} were injected in October of that year.
