= Kemper Project =

Power station in Mississippi, US

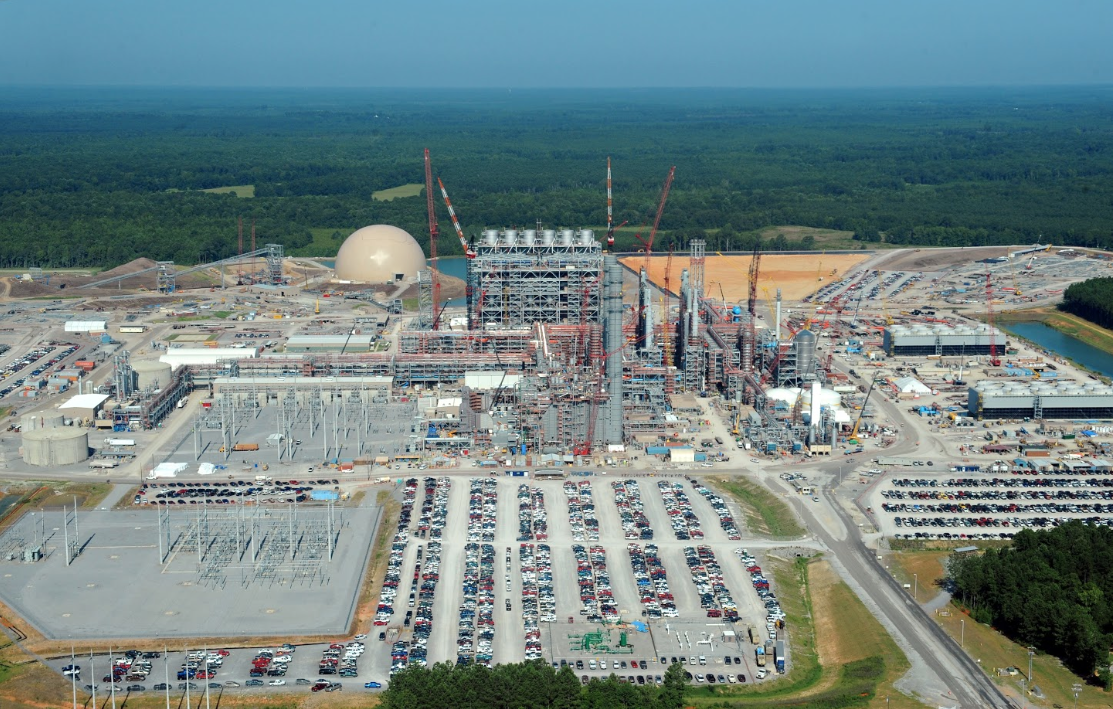
- Location of Kemper Project in Mississippi
- Official name: Kemper County energy facility
- Country: United States
- Location: Kemper County, Mississippi
- Coordinates: 32°39′4.45″N 88°45′32.5″W
- Status: Operational
- Construction began: June 3, 2010
- Construction cost: $6.7 billion
- Owners: Mississippi Power; ~~South Mississippi Electric Power Association~~

Thermal power station
- Primary fuel: Natural gas

Power generation
- Units under const.: 582-megawatt
- Nameplate capacity: 582-megawatt electric

External links
- Website: Official website

The Kemper Project, also called the Kemper County energy facility or Plant Ratcliffe, was an attempt at a gas-fired electrical generating station in Kemper County, Mississippi. Mississippi Power, a subsidiary of Southern Company, began construction of the plant in 2010. The initial, coal-fired project was central to President Obama's Climate Plan, as it was to be based on "clean coal" and was being considered for more support from the Congress and the incoming Trump Administration in late 2016. If it had become operational with coal, the Kemper Project would have been a first-of-its-kind electricity plant to employ gasification and carbon capture technologies at this scale.

Project management problems had been noted at the Kemper Project. The plant was supposed to be in service by May 2014, at a cost of $2.4 billion. As of June 2017, the project was still not in service, and the cost had increased to $7.5 billion. According to a Sierra Club analysis, Kemper is the most expensive power plant ever built, based on its generating capacity. In June 2017, Southern Company and Mississippi Power announced that the Kemper project would switch to burning only natural gas in an effort to manage costs. Some of the gasification infrastructure was demolished in 2021.

== Background ==
Kemper County is a small county in eastern Mississippi, roughly 30 miles north of Meridian. Kemper County was chosen as the site for the plant to take advantage of local brown coal (lignite), an untapped natural resource, while providing geographic diversity to help balance the electric demand and strengthen electric reliability in Mississippi. Mississippi Power is a large energy company based in Gulfport, providing energy for Gulfport, Biloxi, Hattiesburg, Meridian, Pascagoula, Columbia, Laurel, Waveland, Lucedale and Picayune.

Mississippi Power intended the Kemper Project to produce cleaner energy through the use of integrated gasification combined cycle (IGCC) and carbon capture technologies, eliminating the majority of emissions normally emitted by a traditional coal plant. A study conducted by Southern Company (parent of Mississippi Power) stated that the Kemper Project would have been "a large undertaking with high visibility and ... help set the stage for future coal-based power generation.

On June 3, 2010, the Mississippi Public Service Commission certified the project and the ground-breaking ceremony took place. Governor Haley Barbour was present.

== Timeline ==
- 2008: Conceptual design initiated
- 2010: Mississippi Public Service Commission approves project
- 2010: Construction begins
- 2011: Building foundation begins
- 2012: Above ground construction started
- 2013

- August: Connection of the site's 230 kilovolt transmission lines
- September: First firing of the plant's combustion turbine (CTs) achieved
- October: Combined cycle unit originally synchronized to the grid
- December: Final transmission line that will carry electricity was energized

- 2014

- July: Pneumatic tests on gasifiers used to convert lignite to synthetic gas successfully tested
- July: Combined cycle unit responsible for generating electricity successfully tested
- August: Combined cycle unit in commercial operation and available to serve customers. Mississippi Power identified this milestone as the most significant to date.
- October: Delays postpone in-service date to first half of 2016, and increase estimated cost to $6.1 billion.
- December: 48 "steam blows" successfully completed. Steam blow is the process of blowing steam through pipes to ensure that they are clean, tight, and leak free.

- 2015

- March: First fire of gasifiers successfully completed. The gasifiers, the centerpiece of the project, are designed to convert lignite coal to synthetic gas, or syngas, for use in power generation.
- May: The South Mississippi Electric Power Association decided not to purchase a 15 percent interest in the Kemper Project.
- September: Mississippi Power adjusted scheduled completion to a date after April 19, 2016. Because of this delay, the company will be required to pay back $234 million in investment tax credits to the Internal Revenue Service.

- 2016

- March: Southern Co. reported to the U.S. Securities and Exchange Commission that the cost of the Kemper Project had increased due to "repairs and modifications". The updated cost of the project was $6.6 billion.
- July: First of two gasifiers produces syngas.
- September: Second of two gasifiers produces syngas.
- October: Plant produces electricity using syngas in first of two gasifiers.

- 2017

- March: Southern Co. discovered leaks that will cause it to miss scheduled mid-March completion of the project.
- June: Kemper power plant suspends coal gasification.

- 2021, October: the gasification structure was demolished

== Lignite ==
Lignite is a soft, brownish-black coal that has the lowest energy content of any type of coal. It is also very dirty when burned.

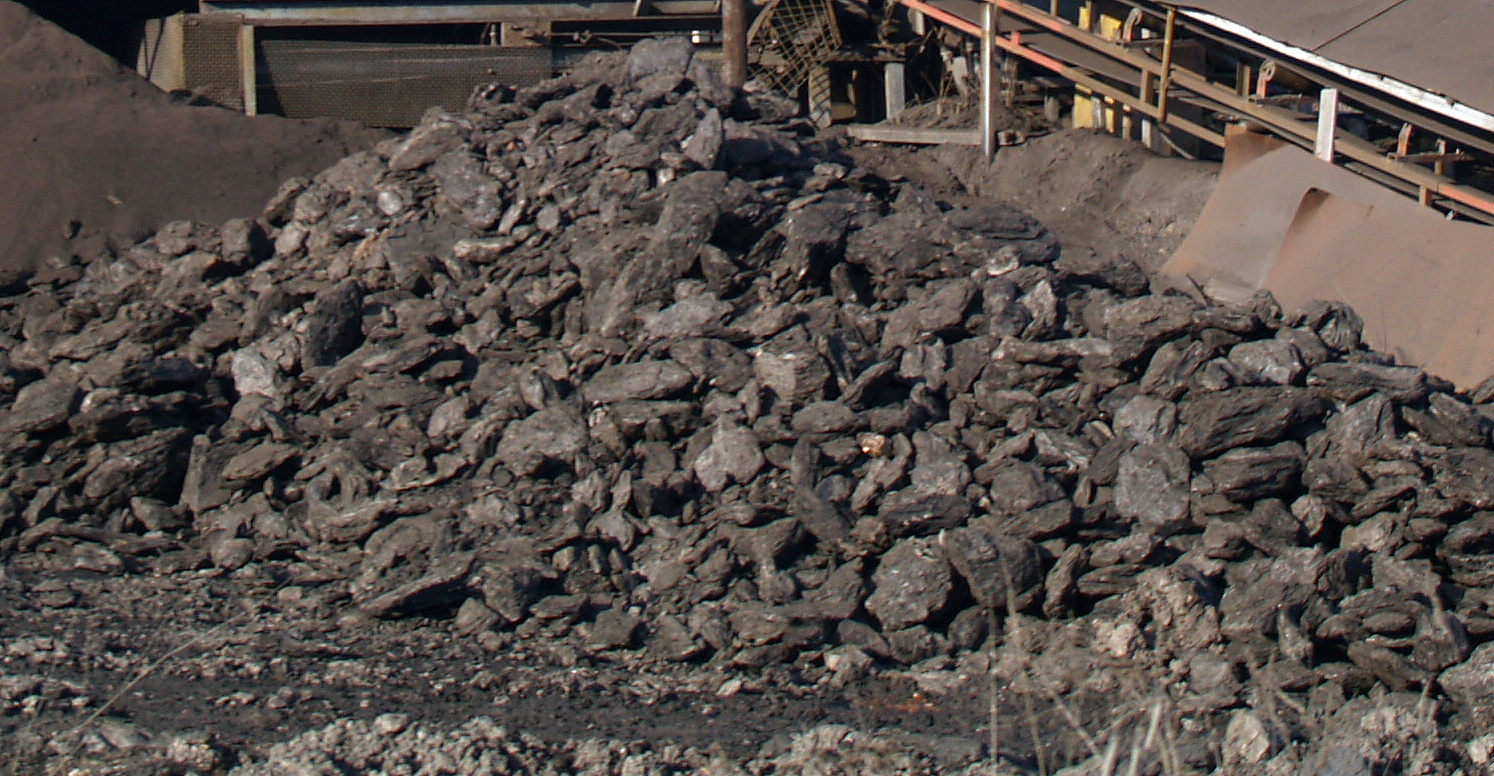
Lignite coal

According to the Lignite Energy Council about 79 percent of lignite coal is used to generate electricity, 13.5 percent to generate synthetic natural gas, and 7.5 percent to produce fertilizer products. Mississippi has an estimated five billion tons of coal reserves, consisting almost entirely of eocene lignite. The typical lignite beds that can be economically mined range from two to nine feet thick. Mississippi's lignite resources equal about 13 percent of total U.S. lignite reserves.

The Kemper plant was expected to use about 375,000 tons of locally mined lignite per month or almost 185 million tons over the plant's expected 40-year life. TRIG technology can utilize lignite, which is also a driving factor of the technology.

== Technology ==
Mississippi Power's Kemper plant was intended to be an integrated gasification combined cycle (IGCC) facility, utilizing a technology known as "transport integrated gasification" (TRIG) to convert lignite coal—mined on the Kemper site—into syngas. The natural gas would then have been used to power turbines to generate electricity.

Mississippi Power stated that, by adding coal to its sources of power, it wished to add balance to its fuel-source choices, and be less reliant on any one form of energy. There is an estimated four billion tons of lignite available to be used.

If successful, the Kemper Project would have been the second TRIG facility in the United States. Producing electricity from coal in this way produces tremendous amounts of carbon dioxide, and Mississippi Power hoped that 65 percent of the carbon dioxide would be captured and utilized in Enhanced Oil Recovery at neighboring oil fields.

=== Transport integrated gasification technology ===
TRIG was developed by the Department of Energy, Southern Company and KBR at the Power Systems Development Facility in Wilsonville, Alabama.

Southern Company stated that TRIG is a superior coal-gasification method with low impacts to the environment. TRIG technology can utilize lignite, which accounts for more than half of the world's coal reserves and drove global interest in the plant.

Power Magazine posted an article in April 2013, walking through the technology in technical detail. They say, "Commercial TRIG units can be designed to achieve high environmental standards for SO_{2}, NO_{x}, dust emissions, mercury, and CO_{2}. Cost analysis based on extensive design has shown that the economic benefits offered by the air-blown transport gasifier relative to other systems are preserved even when CO_{2} capture and sequestration are incorporated into the design."

=== Clean coal ===
If the carbon, capture and sequestration technology used at the Kemper Project had been successful, it would have been the United States’ first clean coal plant. The need for this type of technology has come from decades of debate among energy leaders on how to minimize carbon dioxide emissions into the Earth's atmosphere. In 2013, the United States' coal use was 40%, dominating all other energy sources. Realizing the demand for coal was not decreasing, Mississippi Power, Southern Company, KBR, and the Department of Energy invested in technology to capture emissions from burning fossil fuels. The investing bodies argued the type of clean coal technology they claim are found at the Kemper Project will be adopted worldwide; bringing profits back to Mississippi customers.

Environmentalists state that clean coal is not a possibility, as some emissions will still be emitted into the atmosphere.

=== Carbon capture and sequestration ===
Carbon capture and sequestration, also referred to as carbon capture and storage (CCS), is a technology that can capture up to 90% of the carbon dioxide (CO_{2}) emissions. CCS uses a combination of technologies to capture the CO_{2} released in the combustion process, transport it to a suitable storage location and finally store it (typically deep underground) where it cannot enter the atmosphere and thus contribute to climate change. CO_{2} sequestration options include saline formations and oil wells, where captured CO_{2} can be utilized in enhanced oil recovery.

Due to rising global demand for energy, the consumption of fossil fuels is expected to rise until 2035, leading to greater CO_{2} emissions.

=== Carbon dioxide enhanced oil recovery ===
Carbon dioxide enhanced oil recovery or CO_{2}-EOR increases the amount of oil recovered from an underground oil reservoir. By pumping CO_{2} into an oil reservoir, previously unrecoverable oil is pushed up to where the oil can be reached. The US Department of Energy states that this can produce an additional 30 to 60 percent of the original amount of recoverable oil. Once all of the recoverable oil has been reached, the depleted reservoir can act as a storage site for the CO_{2}.

The Kemper Plant was planned to have 60 miles of pipeline to carry its captured CO_{2} to neighboring oil reserves for enhanced oil recovery. Each year, the plant will capture 3 million tons of CO_{2}. In March 2014, The Guardian published that the diverted CO_{2} will be pumped into two Mississippi companies for use in enhanced oil recovery.

== Research and development ==
The Department of Energy, the Southern Company, and construction management firm KBR (Kellogg, Brown & Root) joined at the Power Systems Development Facility (PSDF) in Wilsonville, Alabama to develop a process known as Transport Integrated Gasification (TRIG). This development started in 1996, and the gasifier design of Southern Company's Kemper Coal Plant is based on this specific research and development. The technology is most cost-effective when using low-heat content, high moisture, or high-ash content coals, including lignite.

According to the U.S. Department of Energy, coal gasification offers one of the most versatile and clean ways to convert coal into electricity, hydrogen, and other valuable energy products. Rather than burning coal directly, gasification (a thermo-chemical process) breaks down coal into its basic chemical constituents.

The technology of processing coal to gas on a commercial scale has been in development since the 1970s, and it has been in use since the mid-1980s.

The TRIG technology, derived from fluidized catalytic cracking units used in the petrochemical industry, uses a pressurized, circulating fluidized bed unit. The transport gasification system features higher efficiencies and is capable of processing low-rank coals, such as lignite. Additionally, commercial TRIG units can be designed to achieve high environmental standards for sulfur dioxide, nitrogen dioxide, dust emissions, mercury, and carbon dioxide. Cost analysis based on the Kemper Coal Plant's design has shown that the economic benefits offered by the air-blown transport gasifier, relative to other systems, are preserved even when carbon dioxide capture and sequestration methodologies are incorporated into the design.

The largest transport gasifier built to date commenced operation in 1996 at Southern Company's PSDF. The gasifier and auxiliary equipment at the site were sized to provide reliable data for confident scale-up to commercial scale. The demonstration unit proved easy to operate and control, achieving more than 15,600 hours of gasification. The demonstration-scale gasifier successfully gasified high-moisture lignite from the Red Hills Mine in Mississippi in four separate test campaigns for more than 2,300 hours of operations. On lignite, the transport gasifier operated smoothly over a range of conditions, confirming the gasifier design for Kemper County.

== Legal issues ==
In February 2015, the Mississippi Supreme Court ruled Mississippi Power must refund 186,000 South Mississippi ratepayers for rate increases related to the Kemper Project. These fees are derived from Mississippi's Baseload Act, allowing Mississippi Power to charge ratepayers for powerplants under construction.

In May 2016, Southern Company and its subsidiary Mississippi Power announced they were being investigated by the Securities and Exchange Commission related to overruns at the Kemper Project. The project had been repeatedly delayed and costs increased from $2.88 billion to $6.7 billion.

In June 2016, Mississippi Power was sued by Treetop Midstream Services over the cancellation of a contract to receive carbon dioxide from the Kemper Project as part of the carbon capture and storage design. Treetop had contracted to buy carbon dioxide from the Kemper plant and had built a pipeline in preparation to receive the gas. Treetop alleged Mississippi Power had fraudulently and "intentionally misrepresenting and concealing the start date" for the Kemper Project, though Mississippi Power stated the suit was without merit.

The company was also found to have unlawfully fired a whistle-blower who had criticized alleged false statements by company management.

== Environmental controversies ==
Environmental groups argue that the project is an expensive undertaking that offers only limited benefits. In 2011, the Sierra Club and Bridge the Gulf organizations spearheaded the effort to lobby the U.S. Army Corps of Engineers to deny the required wetland permits, which Mississippi Company would have to fill to build the plant's facilities.

The Mississippi Chapter of the Sierra Club is arguing that the location where the facilities are planned to be built needs to be left alone. They argue that the position of the facilities on a wetland will pollute the environment with tainted water runoff. Also, they believe that the extraction of the lignite will erode the environment and force the relocation of many Mississippians. Mitigation construction activities included the enhancement of 31 acres of wetlands, 105 acres of riparian buffer, and approximately 3,000 linear feet of stream channel. In an agreement with the city of Meridian, the plant is using city wastewater as its only water source. Additionally, the Kemper Project site is a "zero" liquid discharge facility. Therefore, no processed water from the plant is discharged into rivers, creeks or streams.

== Political controversies ==
Mississippi Governor Haley Barbour has praised the planned project's potential of placing Mississippi in national prominence, mostly because it would be the first U.S. commercial-scale power plant to capture carbon. Additionally, former Speaker of the House Newt Gingrich expressed his support for the Kemper Project, stating that in his opinion it had the potential to be the single most important experiment in developing electricity in the world today. Gingrich's closing words of encouragement for the Kemper Project and the state of Mississippi: "You have a chance to be a remarkable leader in the country in the next 10 to 20 years."

The Kemper Project received an estimated $270 million in Department of Energy funds after the Southern Company's plan for the proposed Orlando Gasification Project bunked when Florida decided the state was not interested in more coal plants. These transferred funds were moved from Florida to Mississippi in December 2008, after Haley Barbour's Washington D.C. lobbying firm, the BGR Group, pushed for the reallocation. Southern Company has been a BGR client since 1999, having spent a total of $2.6 million with the firm, according to federal lobbying disclosure documents. Southern Company alleges that Governor Barbour did not help them receive any additional funding at all. The BGR Group website has deleted all connections with Southern Company from its website.

Mississippi state law was changed to permit charging ratepayers for construction of the facility. In 2017 the Mississippi Public Service Commission recommended the facility burn natural gas rather than syngas from coal to avoid the risk of further consumer rate increases.

The plant missed all its targets and plans for "clean coal" generation were abandoned in July 2017. The plant is expected to go ahead burning natural gas only.

== See also ==
- Petra Nova, a CCS project for the WA Parish Generating Station in Texas
