= Cooperative Energy =

Electrical company in Mississippi, USA

- Formerly: South Mississippi Electric Power Association
- Industry: Power industry
- Founded: 1941 in Mississippi
- Headquarters: Hattiesburg, Mississippi, United States
- Website: cooperativeenergy.com

Cooperative Energy (CE) is an electrical generation and transmission cooperative in Hattiesburg, Mississippi providing power to more than 427,000 homes and businesses.

== Company ==
=== 1941-1999 ===
The company was founded in 1941 as South Mississippi Electric, shortly after the Rural Electrification Act was passed. Based in Hattiesburg, Missouri, according to ProPublica, its tax exemption as a non-profit was issued in February 1968.

It opened the 400 megawatt R.D. Morrow Sr. Generating Station in 1978. In 2019, an environmental report said the coal-fired plant was in the top 10 in the United States for coal ash contamination of groundwater. Officials at the plant responded that the groundwater was not a drinking water source.

=== 2000-2026 ===
In 2015, the cooperative decided not to purchase a 15 percent interest in Mississippi Power's coal gasification power plant in Kemper County, Mississippi known as the Kemper Project. CEO in November 2016 was Jim Compton. It operated in 55 of that 82 counties in the state.

On November 9, 2016, the South Mississippi Electric Power Association (SMEPA) changed its name to Cooperative Energy. In 2017 the cooperative opened a solar farm (photovoltaic power station) near Sumrall, Mississippi. Origis Energy runs the 52 megawatt farm, and Cooperative Energy purchases the electricity. The 60 times increase in Cooperative Energy's use of solar energy was the result of a member poll, with 84% of responders wanting more renewable power involved.

In 2021, Cooperative Energy, along with GE Research and Prolec GE, announced the start of a six-month field demonstration of a "flexible" transformer. In 2024, it operated in 55 Mississippi counties out of 82. Also in 2024, it had revenue of $1.02B, and expenses of $1.02B as well.
