= Southern Company Services =

Southern Company Services, Inc.
- Company type: Subsidiary
- Industry: Electric Utility
- Founded: 1963; 63 years ago
- Headquarters: Birmingham, Alabama, U.S.
- Key people: Mark Lantrip (CEO and president)
- Products: Shared Services
- Number of employees: 4,536 (2008)
- Parent: Southern Company
- Website: southerncompany.com

Southern Company Services, Inc., headquartered in Birmingham, Alabama, is the shared services division of Southern Company. Formed in 1963, as Southern Services, the company provides administrative and operational services to all of Southern Company's operating divisions. The company also provides engineering services to Alabama Power, Georgia Power, Gulf Power and Mississippi Power.

== History ==
=== 1960s to 1980s ===
Southern Services was formed in 1963 as a shared services department for Southern Company's five electric operating divisions. The idea was first conceived by Eugene A. Yates, Southern Company's first President, although not implemented until much later. The division was originally headquartered in what is now the First Commercial Bank Building in the Birmingham suburb of Mountain Brook, Alabama until it moved to the Inverness suburb in the late 1980s, followed by a relocation to the Colonnade office towers in 2017. The division also has a large office in Atlanta, Georgia.

=== 2000 to present ===
In January 2016, the United States Department of Energy announced a $80m award fund to develop Generation IV reactor designs. One of two beneficiaries, Southern Company Services will use the funding to develop a Molten Chloride Fast Reactor, a type of MSR developed earlier by British scientists at Atomic Energy Research Establishment. It will partner with TerraPower, Electric Power Research Institute, Vanderbilt University and Oak Ridge National Laboratory; presumably in conjunction with sister division Southern Nuclear.
