= Petra Nova =

Texas, U.S.A. carbon-capture project

Coordinates: 29°28′32″N 95°38′09″W

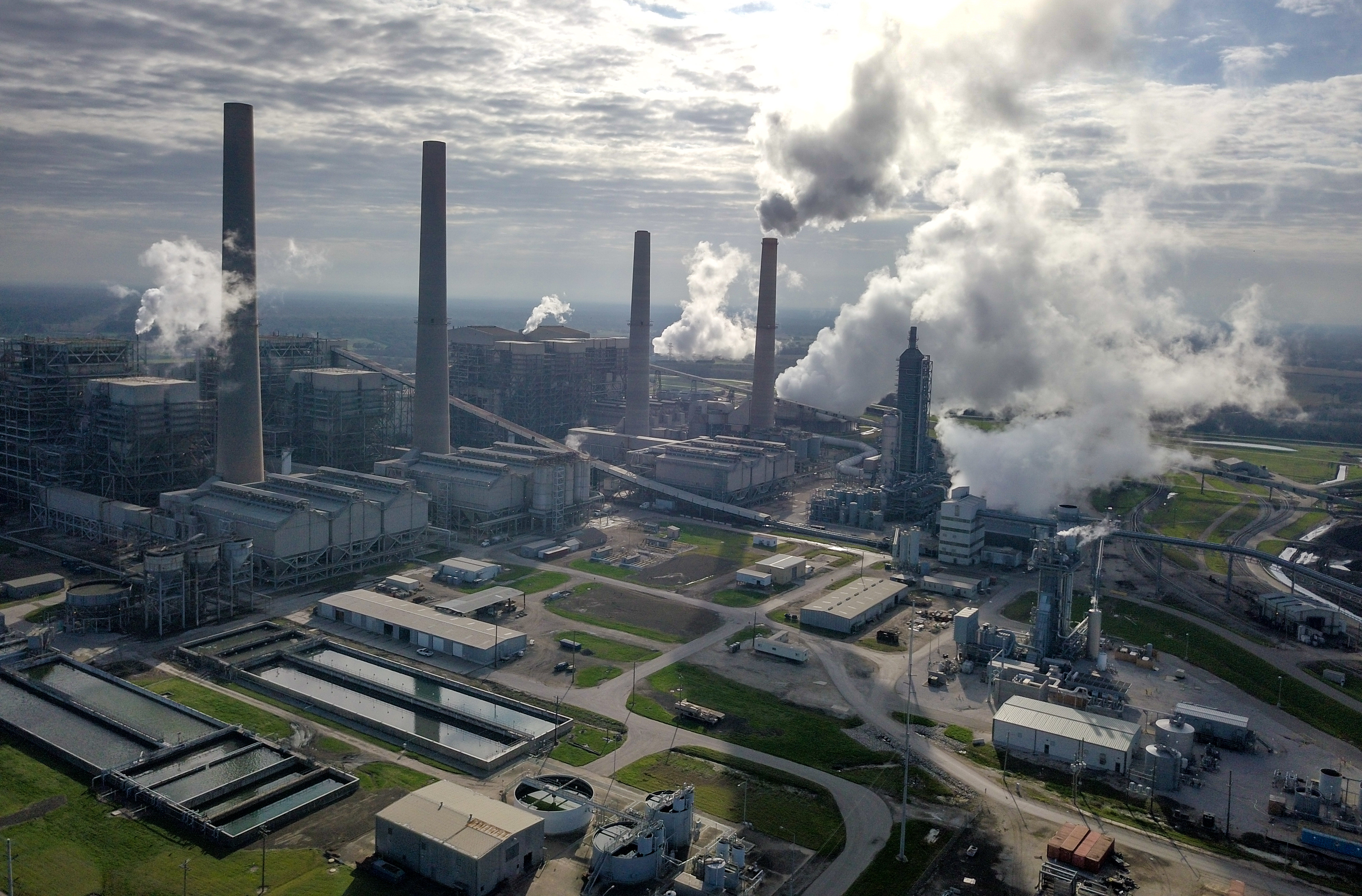
Petra Nova shown on the right.

Petra Nova is a carbon capture project designed to reduce carbon emissions from one of the boilers of a coal burning power plant in Thompsons, Texas. It is a multi-million dollar project taken up by NRG Energy and JX Nippon Oil to retrofit one of the boilers at their WA Parish Generating Station with a post-combustion carbon capture treatment system to treat a portion of the atmospheric exhaust emissions from the retrofitted boiler.

== History ==
=== Construction and Initial Operation ===
The original coal-fired plant entered commercial service in 1977, and the new carbon emissions reduction system was first put into operation on January 10, 2017. The project was designed to annually capture approximately 33% of the carbon dioxide (CO_{2}) (or 1.6 million tonnes) emissions from the plant's boiler #8.

The carbon dioxide gas was captured at 99% purity, and is then compressed and piped about 82 miles to the West Ranch Oil Field, where it is used for enhanced oil recovery. The oil field had previously been producing 300 barrels of oil per day. With the new injection of high pressure carbon dioxide into the field, the oil production of the field was increased by a factor of 50 to 15,000 barrels per day. This project was expected to run for at least another 20 years. To satisfy the Clean Coal Power Initiative requirements, the Texas Bureau of Economic Geology put a monitoring plan in place to keep track of the injection and movement of the CO_{2} beneath the surface and in the rock structures at West Ranch.

On May 1, 2020, NRG temporarily shut down Petra Nova, citing low oil prices during the COVID-19 pandemic. Due primarily to outages of the host natural gas cogeneration unit, the project missed its carbon sequestration goal by 17% over its first three years of operation.

=== Restarting ===
On September 14, 2022, Japan's Eneos Holdings Inc announced plans to acquire full ownership of Petra Nova Parish Holdings. JX Nippon Oil & Gas Exploration, Eneos' subsidiary, purchased the remaining 50% stake from NRG Energy Inc for $3.6 million. Eneos' strategy was to gain expertise in carbon capture, utilization, and storage (CCUS) technology through this move, and they announced plans to restart the unit in the second quarter of 2023. On September 13, 2023, JX Nippon Oil & Gas Exploration Corporation announced the resumption of operations beginning on September 5, 2023.

== Technology ==
The Petra Nova carbon emissions reduction system uses an amine-based absorption system, or the KM CDR Process (Kansai Mitsubishi Carbon Dioxide Recovery). This process was developed by Mitsubishi Heavy Industries and Kansai Electric Power and utilizes a high performing proprietary solvent called KS-1. The CO_{2} is removed from the exhaust gas through a basic absorber-stripper system. The gaseous CO_{2} is then compressed to a supercritical liquid. The CO_{2} leaving the carbon capture plant is over 99% pure and is sent 82 miles through 12-inch diameter pipes to their end location of the West Ranch oil field, where it is used for enhanced oil recovery. The carbon dioxide from the Petra Nova Initiative will eventually end up in sandstone in the Frio Formation of the West Ranch oil field. It will remain about 5,000 feet underground and cover more than 4,000 acres of ground area.

== Economics ==
The Petra Nova carbon emissions reduction system cost approximately $1 billion to install, and received a nearly $190 million grant from the U.S. Government under the Clean Coal Initiative, as well as a $250 million loan from the Japanese government. The increased oil recovery in the adjacent oil field was expected to result in a net savings. However, when the project was first proposed oil prices were very high (at $100 per barrel) and it was assumed that they would not drop. As of 2017, the current oil price was about $50 per barrel and therefore a net loss has resulted regarding the oil production at the field. On May 1, 2020, NRG temporarily shut down Petra Nova, citing the low cost of oil as a result of the COVID-19 pandemic.
