= Jacob Horton =

American businessman (died 1989)

Jacob "Jake" Horton (died April 10, 1989) was a senior vice-president of Southern Company's Gulf Power unit, killed when a corporate airplane caught fire and crashed into a Pensacola apartment complex, shortly after takeoff from Pensacola, Florida. Journalist Greg Palast has alleged that Horton was murdered by the corporation, in order to prevent him from accusing the board of directors of making illegal payments to politicians.
