= George H. Starke Jr. =

First Black student at the University of Florida

George H. Starke Jr. was the first Black student admitted to the University of Florida.

In 1958, Starke entered the University of Florida's law school after graduating from Morehouse College. He was given police protection during his first semester at the university, due to a plot by the KKK to kill him.

Starke and Fred Levin, for whom the law school is now named, became friends and faced many challenges together. Levin was one of the few Jewish students to attend the law school. Starke and Levin often studied together or alone while classmates formed separate study groups. Eventually, Starke left the university after three semesters without graduating. After leaving the school, he had a 40-year career in finance working as an energy consultant, mortgage broker, and an investment banker.

Starke had no relationship with the university until 1981 when former University of Florida President J. Wayne Reitz, who led the school when Starke was admitted, invited Starke to become involved with the university. Reitz's overture was an icebreaker and the impetus for the university to include Starke in future activities and events.

As an active alumni member, Starke participated in several programs and visited the law school regularly. He received the Distinguished Alumnus Award in 2009.

In spring 2019, the University of Florida recognized Starke with an honorary Doctor of Laws degree. Starke attended the ceremony with his wife Barbara, son Andrew (Drew), daughter-in-law Angela and grandchildren Sydney and Spencer, along with other relatives.

Florida State Representative Geraldine Thompson sponsored a resolution on April 15, 2021, that honored Starke for his contribution to Florida education and history. The Gator Caucus, led by State Representative Charles "Chuck" Clemons, cosponsored the resolution.
