= Southern Telecom (Southern Company) =

Southern Telecom logo

Southern Telecom is the wireline, fiber optic telecommunications subsidiary of Southern Company (NYSE: SO). Established in 1997 as an Exempt Telecommunications Company (ETC) pursuant to the Telecommunications Act of 1996, Southern Telecom is headquartered in Atlanta, Georgia.
