= David J. Grain =

American CEO

- Born: May 31, 1962 (age 64); Brooklyn, New York, U.S.
- Education: College of the Holy Cross (BA); Dartmouth College (MBA)
- Occupations: Entrepreneur; businessman; investor
- Title: CEO and Managing Director of Grain Management LLC
- Awards: American Academy of Arts and Sciences (2022)

David J. Grain (born May 31, 1962) is an American entrepreneur, businessman, and philanthropist. He is the current chief executive officer (CEO) of the global investment firm Grain Management LLC, which he founded in 2007 and is headquartered in Washington D.C. His firm invests exclusively in the telecommunications sector, using what the firm refers to as "algorithmic, computational investment analysis" to inform its investment decisions.

== Early life and education ==
Grain was born in Brooklyn, New York, to Dora and Walter Grain. He graduated from the College of the Holy Cross in Worcester, Massachusetts, with a Bachelor of Arts in English in 1984. Grain then earned a Master of Business Administration (M.B.A.) from the Tuck School of Business of Dartmouth College in 1989.

== Career ==
Grain began his career at Drexel Burnham Lambert in 1989, where he worked for a year before being recruited by Morgan Stanley. He became principal after two years with the company, and continued his work there until moving on to AT&T in 2000. He served as the New England region's Senior Vice President until 2003, and then as President of Pinnacle Holdings, Inc. until 2005, while simultaneously serving as director of Newcastle Investment Corporation. During his short tenure at Pinnacle Holdings, he was able to rescue the company from bankruptcy and grew its portfolio from 2,000 sites to over 11,000.

Grain is former Lead Independent Director, current Chair for Nominating, Governance, and Corporate Responsibility Committee and a Member of the Compensation Committee for Southern Company.

Grain sits on multiple boards of directors and councils, serving as an Independent Director of Dell Technologies and Director of New Fortress Energy and Trustee of the Brookings Institution. Grain sits on the board of directors for the Martha's Vineyard Museum and serves on the advisory council for the National Museum of African American History and Culture.

Grain received a presidential appointment to the National Infrastructure Advisory Council in 2011, where he chaired the Critical Infrastructure Security and Resilience National R&D Plan, and he was appointed to the council again in 2024.

In 2009, the Governor of Florida appointed Grain to the State Board of Administration’s Investment Advisory Council where he served as Chairman. He is also a lifetime member of the Council on Foreign Relations.

Grain is known for his political support of the Democratic Party. He contributed a minimum of $200,000 to $500,000 in the 2008 elections. In September 2024, he added his name to a long list of business leaders who endorsed Kamala Harris in her run for the U.S. presidency.

Grain has been a member of the Board of Trustees of Dartmouth College since July 1, 2024. He also served for eight years as a Trustee of College of the Holy Cross. In August 2024, Grain was voted Board Chair of The Martha’s Vineyard Museum Board.

== Philanthropy ==
Grain and his wife founded the Grain Fellows Program which assists low-income families by providing funding for SAT and college preparation. They also adopted the high school Booker High in Sarasota, Florida, to which they provide support to a mentorship program, along with supporting the school's college programs.

The Grains were recognized by the National Urban Technology Center in 2018 at the center's annual awards gala, where they received the Corporate Leadership Award for their philanthropic efforts within their community.

In 2023, Grain received Morehouse College’s “Candle in the Dark” Award in Entrepreneurship and Philanthropy.

In 2024, Grain received A Better Chance’s Chairperson Award.

== Achievements ==
Grain has been recognized as one of the "Top 40 leaders under 40" in Boston by the Boston Business Journals. He was also given the "Ten Outstanding Young Leaders Award" by Boston Jaycees. Grain was elected to the American Academy of Arts and Sciences in 2022.

Grain and his wife were recognized in by the National Urban Technology Center in 2018 at the center's annual award's gala, where they received the Corporate Leadership Award for their philanthropic efforts within their community.

== Personal life ==
Grain is married to Dr. Lisa Grain. She received her D.D.S. from Howard University College of Dentistry and an M.S. in orthodontics from Ohio State University. They have been married for more than 30 years. Together, they have two children, Chelsea and David Jr.
