= Smithers Lake =

Lake in Fort Bend County, Texas, United States

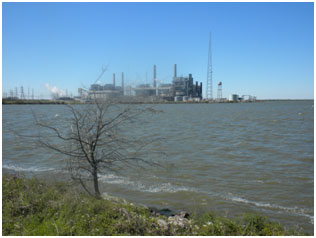
- Smithers Lake with the WA Parish Generating Station in the background

- Location within Texas Location within the United States
- Location: Fort Bend County, Texas
- Coordinates: 29°29′21″N 95°38′53″W
- Surface area: 2,140 acres (8.7 km^{2})
- Water volume: 18,000 acre⋅ft (5.9×10^{9} US gal)
- Surface elevation: 66 feet (20 meters)

Smithers Lake is an artificial impoundment in Fort Bend County, Texas, collecting water from Dry Creek. It is located south of the Brazos River, nine miles (14 km) southeast of Richmond, and is completely within the city limits of Thompsons.

The project is owned and operated by NRG Energy as the cooling-water supply for the WA Parish Generating Station. It was previously owned by the Houston Lighting and Power Company. Construction was started on August 22, 1956, and was completed on July 1, 1957. Water had already been impounded in a small lake, and the date for beginning of impoundment in the new lake was October 15, 1957.
