= WA Parish Generating Station =

Fossil fuelled power plant in the USA

W.A. Parish Generating Station
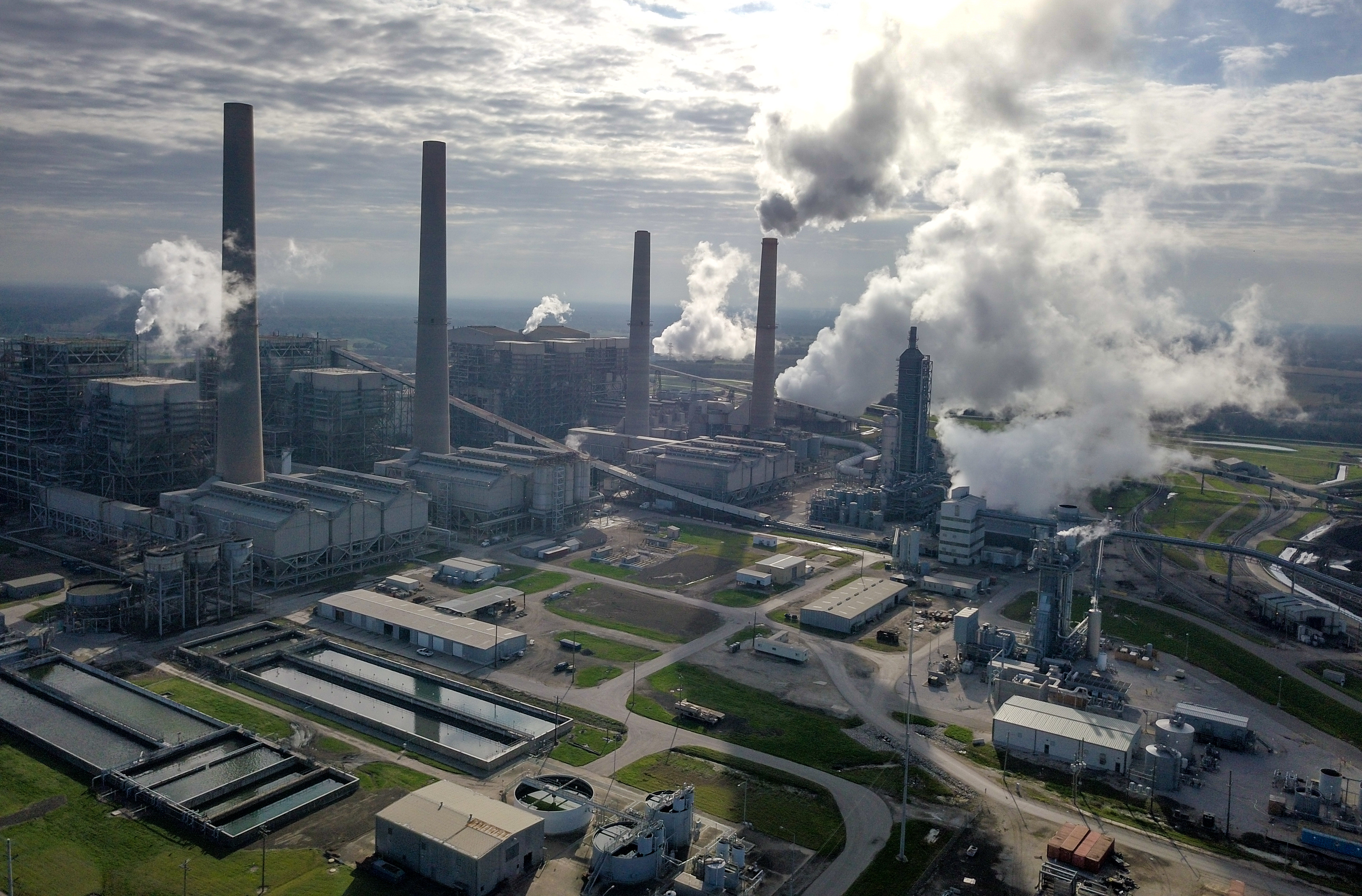
- W.A. Parish, seen from northwest of the facility
- Country: United States
- Location: Thompsons, Texas
- Coordinates: 29°28′34″N 95°38′0″W
- Status: Operational
- Owner: NRG Energy

Thermal power station
- Primary fuel: Coal
- Secondary fuel: Natural gas
- Cooling source: Smithers Lake

Power generation
- Nameplate capacity: 3,653 MW

External links
- Commons: Related media on Commons

The W.A. Parish Generating Station is a 3.65-gigawatt (3,653 MW), dual-fired power plant located near Thompsons, Texas. The station occupies a 4,664-acre site near Smithers Lake southwest of Houston in Fort Bend County and consists of two four-unit plants, one natural gas and the other coal (2,697 MW). With a total installed capacity of 3,653 MW, it is the second largest conventional power station in the US, and supplies about fifteen percent of the energy in the Houston area. NRG Energy owns and operates the plant.

The Powder River Basin supplies three 115-car trainloads worth of low-sulfur coal to units 5-8 or 36,000 tons daily.

When it was completed in January 2017, the post-combustion Petra Nova Carbon Capture Project became the largest installed on an existing power plant in the world. The system pumped 1.6 million tons of filtered carbon dioxide (CO_{2}) from unit 8 to the West Ranch Oil Field 82 miles away in Jackson County. Since the system is powered by natural gas, some of the carbon captured is offset by carbon released by natural gas combustion; initial estimates projected a net removal of 815,000 tons of carbon annually. The system cost approximately $1 billion, but was idled from May 2020 to September 2023 due to the low price of oil during the COVID-19 pandemic.

Adjacent to Parish Station is the natural gas Brazos Valley Power Plant owned by Calpine Energy which opened in 2003.

== Notable incidents ==
During the 2021 Texas power crisis, Parish Station was reported to have experienced an up to 664 MW loss in generation capacity, including an 80 MW decrease in capacity early in the crisis that contributed to the need for rolling blackouts.

The Unit 8 turbine, which has a generating capacity of 610 MW, caught fire the night of May 8, 2022. While there were no injuries reported during the fire, a chemical exposure incident during the repairs briefly hospitalized six workers. The turbine was heavily damaged and was expected to be repaired within a year (by May 7, 2023). However, Unit 8 did not reopen until late August 2023.

== See also ==
- List of largest power stations in the United States
- List of power stations in Texas
