= Thompsons, Texas =

- Town
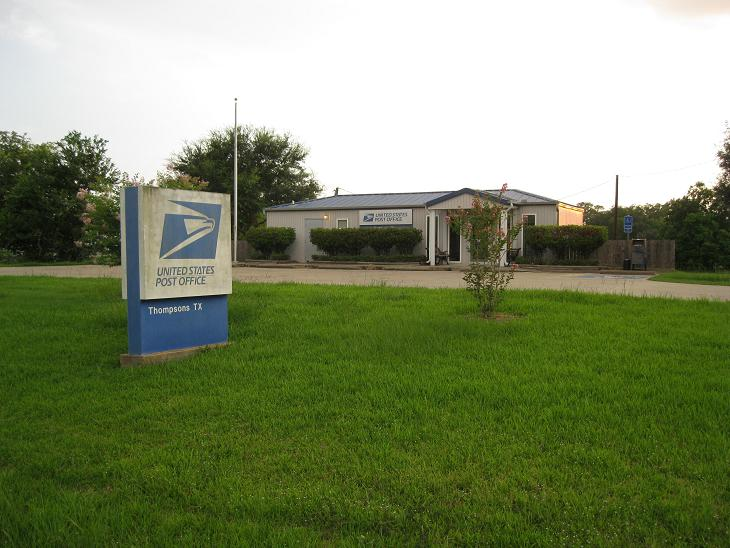
- US post office at Thompsons, Texas

- Location of Thompsons, Texas
- Coordinates: 29°29′11″N 95°36′21″W
- Country: United States
- State: Texas
- County: Fort Bend

Area
  - Total: 8.32 sq mi (21.55 km^{2})
  - Land: 4.93 sq mi (12.78 km^{2})
  - Water: 3.39 sq mi (8.77 km^{2})
- Elevation: 66 ft (20 m)

Population (2020)
  - Total: 156
  - Density: 31.6/sq mi (12.2/km^{2})
- Time zone: UTC-6 (Central (CST))
  - Summer (DST): UTC-5 (CDT)
- ZIP code: 77481
- Area code: 281
- FIPS code: 48-72740
- GNIS feature ID: 1348510
- Website: www.thompsonstx.gov

Thompsons is a town in Fort Bend County, Texas, United States, within the Houston–Pasadena–The Woodlands metropolitan area. The population was 156 at the 2020 census.

== Geography ==
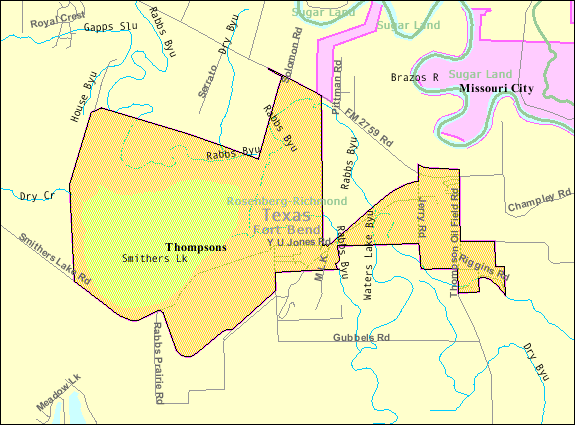
Map of Thompsons

Thompsons is located south of the Brazos River in east-central Fort Bend County at 29°29′11″N 95°36′21″W (29.486494, –95.605803). Richmond, the county seat, is 12 miles (19 km) to the northwest. According to the United States Census Bureau, Thompsons has a total area of 8.3 square miles (21.5 km^{2}), of which 4.9 square miles (12.8 km^{2}) is land and 3.4 square miles (8.8 km^{2}), or 40.71%, is water.

Smithers Lake, an artificial impoundment, along with its associated W.A. Parish Power Plant occupies most of the western half of the town itself. The ETJ of Sugar Land borders the northern end of Thompsons' ETJ; that of Rosenberg is on the west; Missouri City's approaches from the east.

=== Climate ===
The climate in this area is characterized by hot, humid summers and generally mild to cool winters. According to the Köppen Climate Classification system, Thompsons has a humid subtropical climate, abbreviated "Cfa" on climate maps.

== Demographics ==
Historical population
Census	Pop.	Note	%±
1980	240		—
1990	167		−30.4%
2000	236		41.3%
2010	246		4.2%
2020	156		−36.6%
U.S. Decennial Census

=== 2020 census ===
Thompsons town, Texas – Racial and ethnic composition Note: the US Census treats Hispanic/Latino as an ethnic category. This table excludes Latinos from the racial categories and assigns them to a separate category. Hispanics/Latinos may be of any race.
Race / Ethnicity (NH = Non-Hispanic)	Pop 2000	Pop 2010	Pop 2020	% 2000	% 2010	% 2020
White alone (NH)	96	105	56	40.68%	42.68%	35.90%
Black or African American alone (NH)	111	86	55	47.03%	34.96%	35.26%
Native American or Alaska Native alone (NH)	2	0	0	0.85%	0.00%	0.00%
Asian alone (NH)	5	16	6	2.12%	6.50%	3.85%
Native Hawaiian or Pacific Islander alone (NH)	0	0	0	0.00%	0.00%	0.00%
Other race alone (NH)	0	0	0	0.00%	0.00%	0.00%
Mixed race or Multiracial (NH)	3	3	9	1.27%	1.22%	5.77%
Hispanic or Latino (any race)	19	36	30	8.05%	14.63%	19.23%
Total	236	246	156	100.00%	100.00%	100.00%

As of the census of 2000, there were 236 people, 93 households, and 73 families residing in the town. The population density was 38.1 inhabitants per square mile (14.7/km^{2}). There were 114 housing units at an average density of 18.4 per square mile (7.1/km^{2}). The racial makeup of the town was 43.64% White, 47.03% African American, 0.85% Native American, 2.12% Asian, 3.81% from other races, and 2.54% from two or more races. Hispanic or Latino of any race were 8.05% of the population.

There were 93 households, out of which 29.0% had children under the age of 18 living with them, 53.8% were married couples living together, 20.4% had a female householder with no husband present, and 21.5% were non-families. 19.4% of all households were made up of individuals, and 6.5% had someone living alone who was 65 years of age or older. The average household size was 2.54 and the average family size was 2.82.

In the town, the population was spread out, with 22.5% under the age of 18, 11.0% from 18 to 24, 26.3% from 25 to 44, 28.8% from 45 to 64, and 11.4% who were 65 years of age or older. The median age was 39 years. For every 100 females, there were 90.3 males. For every 100 females age 18 and over, there were 84.8 males.

The median income for a household in the town was $32,083, and the median income for a family was $32,321. Males had a median income of $38,125 versus $22,222 for females. The per capita income for the town was $29,977. About 20.0% of families and 20.4% of the population were below the poverty line, including 21.4% of those under the age of eighteen and 29.7% of those 65 or over.

== Government and infrastructure ==
The United States Postal Service operates the Thompsons Post Office at 222 Oilfield Road. The city was first incorporated in 1979 and has a mayor council form of government. The first mayor was mayor G. W. Longserre who was succeeded by current mayor Freddie Newsome.

== Government and infrastructure ==
Fort Bend County does not have a hospital district. OakBend Medical Center serves as the county's charity hospital which the county contracts with.

== Education ==
Thompsons is zoned to Lamar Consolidated Independent School District schools. It is zoned to George Ranch High School.

== Gallery ==
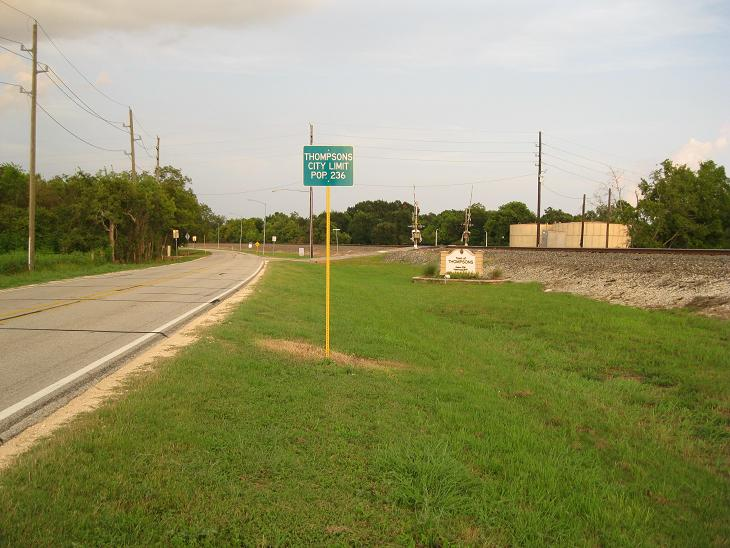
Thompsons road sign on FM 2759

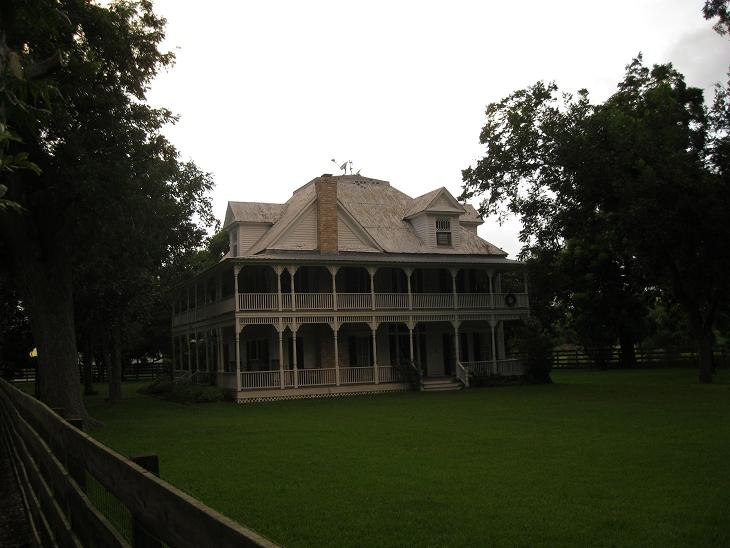
Grand old house in Thompsons

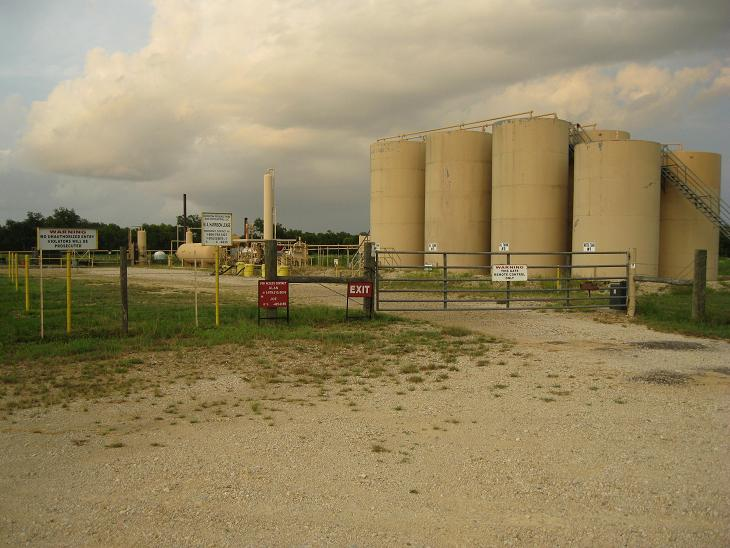
Lease in Thompsons Oil Field

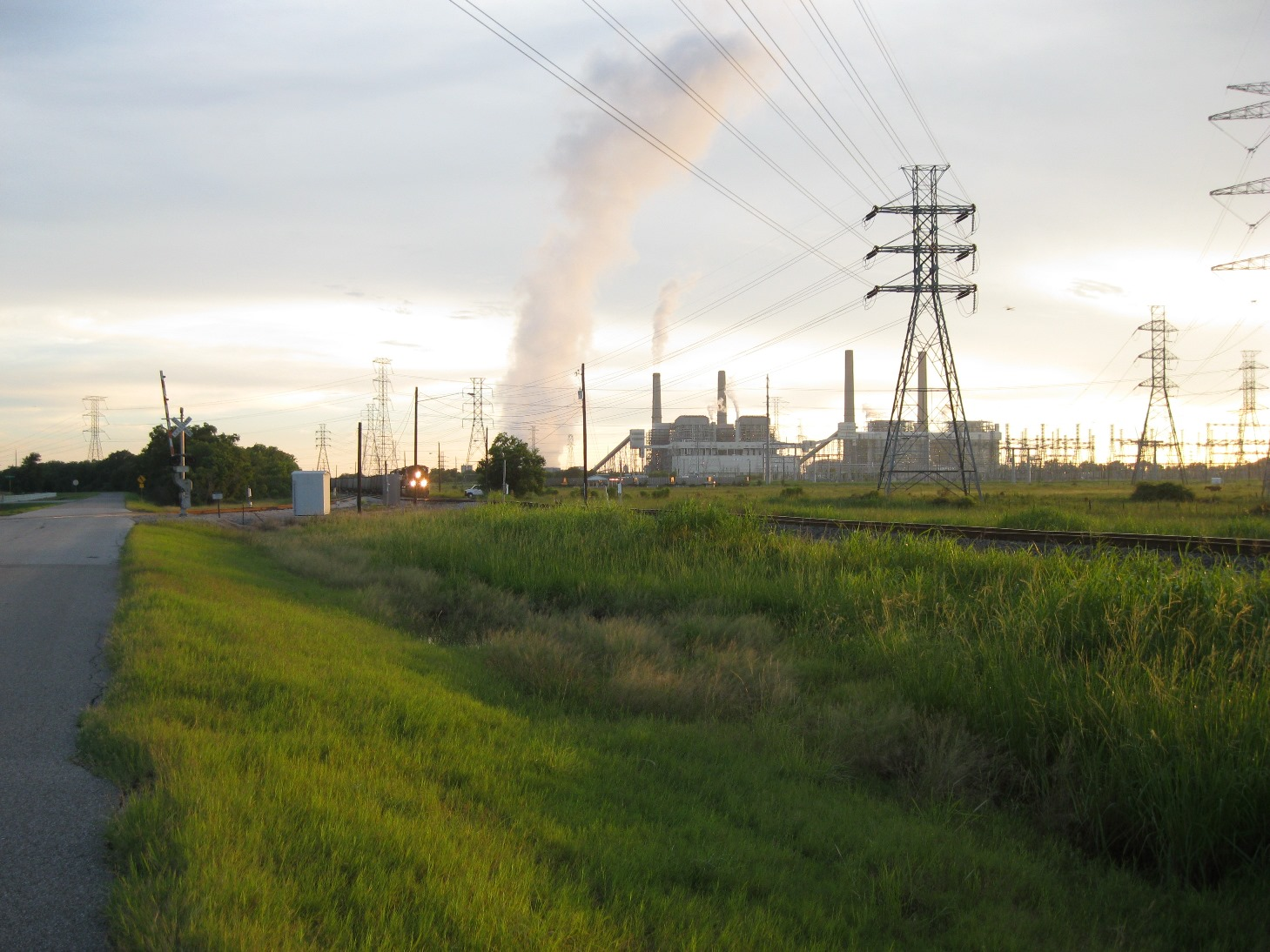
W A Parish Power Plant

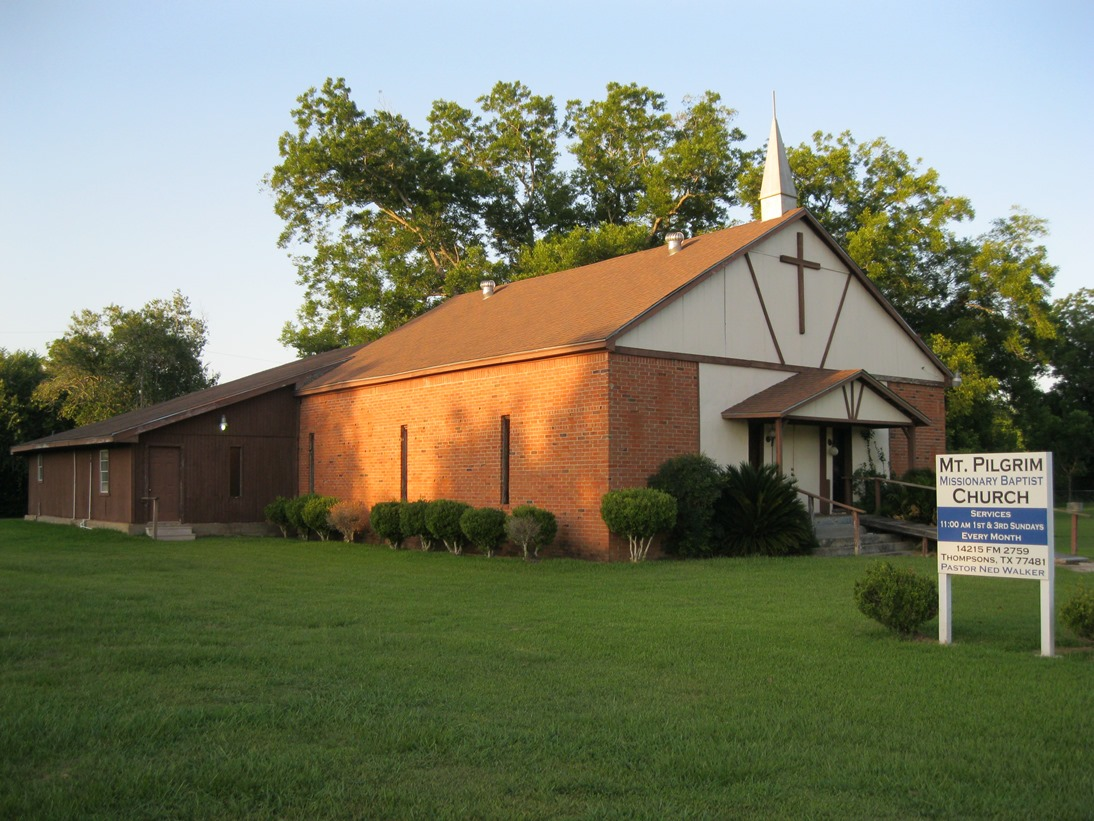
Mt Pilgrim Missionary Baptist Church

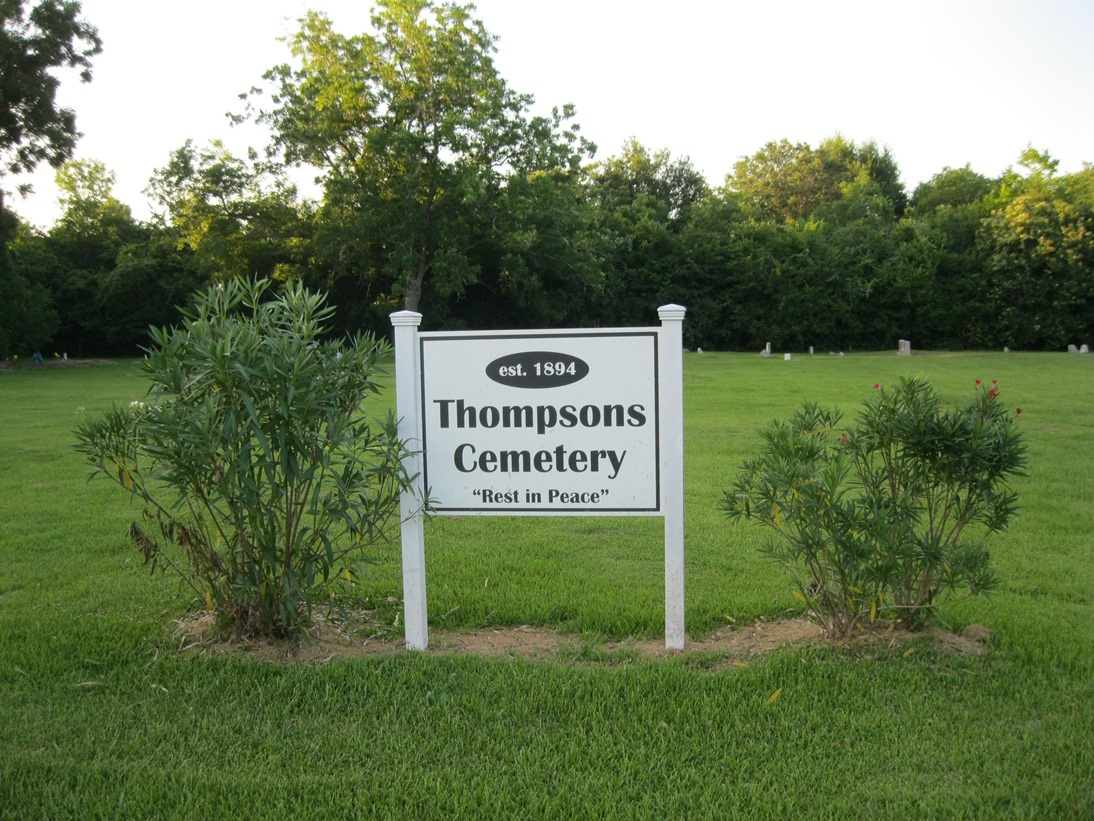
Thompsons Cemetery on FM 2759
