= Southern Company =

U.S. electricity corporation

The Southern Company
- Type: Public
- Traded as: NYSE: SO; DJUA component; S&P 100 component; S&P 500 component
- Industry: Energy, Telecommunications
- Founded: November 1945; 81 years ago
- Headquarters: Atlanta, Georgia, U.S.
- Area served: 6 U.S. states: Alabama; Georgia; Illinois; Mississippi; Tennessee; Virginia
- Key people: Chris Womack; (chairman, president, & CEO); David Poroch; (EVP & CFO)
- Revenue: ▲US$26.72 billion (2024)
- Operating income: ▲US$7.07 billion (2024)
- Net income: ▲US$4.40 billion (2024)
- Total assets: ▲US$145.18 billion (2024)
- Total equity: ▲US$36.67 billion (2024)
- Number of employees: 28,600 (2024)
- Subsidiaries: Southern Company Gas; Alabama Power; Georgia Power; Mississippi Power; Southern Company Services; Southern Linc; Southern Nuclear; Southern Company Generation; Southern Power; Southern Telecom; PowerSecure
- Website: southerncompany.com

Southern Company is an American gas and electric utility holding company based in the Southern United States. It is headquartered in Atlanta, Georgia, with executive offices located in Birmingham, Alabama. As of 2021 it is the second largest utility company in the U.S. in terms of customer base. Through its subsidiaries it serves 9 million gas and electric utility customers in 6 states. Southern Company's regulated regional electric utilities serve a 120,000-square-mile (310,000 km^{2}) territory with 27,000 miles (43,000 km) of distribution lines.

== Overview ==
Southern Company, a for-profit corporation, is one of the largest energy providers in the United States and in 2025, is ranked 163rd on the Fortune 500 listing of the largest U.S. corporations. The company has approximately 31,300 employees. Southern Company subsidiaries are operating or developing renewable power across the U.S., as well as opening the first new nuclear units in the U.S. in 30 years at Plant Vogtle near Augusta, Georgia.

Southern Company's three retail operating companies — Alabama Power, Georgia Power, and Mississippi Power — cover 120,000 square miles (310,000 km^{2}) in three states. Southern Power serves wholesale electricity customers across the country, and Southern Company Gas serves utility customers in seven states.

Southern Company owns the following companies:

- Alabama Power - operating company, based in Birmingham, Alabama. Serves the southern two-thirds of Alabama.
- Georgia Power - operating company, based in Atlanta. Serves all of Georgia, except for mostly rural counties.
- Mississippi Power - operating company, based in Gulfport, Mississippi. Serves the Mississippi Gulf Coast.
- Southern Company Services (originally named Southern Services, Inc.) - Birmingham, Alabama - Common Services
- Southern Linc - cellular telephone provider - Atlanta, Georgia
- Southern Nuclear - engineering and operations for nuclear power plants - Birmingham, Alabama (Southern Company is the majority owner and operator of the Farley, Hatch, and Vogtle nuclear power plants.)
- Southern Company Generation - fossil fuels and hydro operations - Birmingham, Alabama.
- Southern Power - wholesale power generation - Birmingham, Alabama.
- Southern Telecom - wholesale fiber optic communications and data services - Atlanta, Georgia.
- Southern Company Gas - serves gas utility customers and operates natural gas pipelines - Atlanta, Georgia.
- Southern Natural Gas Company - 6,900-mile pipeline system joint venture with Kinder Morgan - Birmingham, Alabama
- PowerSecure - distributed infrastructure technologies - Wake Forest, North Carolina.
- Atlanta Gas Light - provides natural gas delivery service to more than 1.6 million customers in Georgia.
- Chattanooga Gas - provides retail natural gas sales and transportation services to approximately 66,000 customers in Hamilton and Bradley counties in southeast Tennessee.
- Nicor Gas - Provider of natural gas throughout northern Illinois.
- Virginia Natural Gas - Provider of Natural Gas in southeastern Virginia.
- Sequent Energy Management - optimizes natural gas assets and effectively utilize transportation and storage services.
- Southern Wholesale Energy - markets the retail operating companies' surplus generating capacity to the wholesale market.
- Southern Company Transmission - conducts transmission business in accordance with the Southern Companies Open Access Transmission Tariff approved by FERC.

Prior to 2019, Southern Company also owned Gulf Power, an electric utility based in Pensacola, Florida that serves most of the Florida Panhandle. An agreement was reached in May 2018 to sell Gulf Power to rival utility company NextEra Energy. The sale was completed on January 1, 2019. Gulf Power would become the Northwest Florida division of Florida Power & Light (FPL) in 2021, with the Gulf Power name retired in favor of FPL in 2022.

== History ==
Southern Company previous logo

Southern Company can be traced back to 1924, when Southeastern Power & Light was formed as a holding company for Alabama Traction, Light and Power (formed 1906), the immediate forerunner of Alabama Power. Later that year, it formed Mississippi Power as a subsidiary, with Gulf Power following in 1925. In 1926, it merged with Georgia Power (formed 1902).

In 1930, Southeastern Power & Light merged into the Commonwealth & Southern Corporation. The new system included five Northern companies and six Southern companies. However, in the late 1940s Commonwealth & Southern was dissolved to meet the Public Utility Holding Company Act of 1935. Four of Commonwealth & Southern's Deep South operating companies—Alabama Power, Georgia Power, Gulf Power, and Mississippi Power—were deemed to be an integrated system and thus were allowed to remain under common ownership. A new holding company, Southern Company, was incorporated in Delaware on November 9, 1945. It commenced operation in 1949, and moved to Georgia in 1950. In 1954–55, the company was involved in the Dixon-Yates contract with the Atomic Energy Commission, and the associated political controversy.

In 1981, Southern Company became the first electric utility holding company in 46 years to diversify its operations by forming an unregulated subsidiary. In January 1982, Southern Energy, Inc., began official operations as a global energy company, growing to serve 10 countries on four continents. On April 2, 2001, Southern Company completed the spinoff of Southern Energy as Mirant Corporation. Another Southern Company subsidiary—Southern Nuclear—began providing services in 1991 to the system's nuclear power plants.

In 1996, Southern Communications Services began providing digital wireless communications services to Southern Company's subsidiaries and also began marketing these services to the public within the Southeast as Southern Linc. Southern Telecom, a telecommunications subsidiary of Southern Company, was founded in 1997. Southern Telecom provides colocation and dark fiber optic lines to network businesses. On January 9, 2001, Southern Company received final approval from the Securities and Exchange Commission to form Southern Power, a subsidiary to own, manage and finance wholesale generating assets in the Southeast. The new subsidiary targets wholesale customers. On July 19, 2002, Southern Company Gas received certification from the Georgia Public Service Commission to enter the retail gas market. After nearly four years of operations, the company was sold and customers transferred to Cobb EMC's newly formed affiliate, Gas South. In 2011, Southern Company and Turner Renewable Energy purchased a 30 MW solar project from First Solar. Located in Cimarron, New Mexico, it began generating electricity in 2011. In June 2012, the Nacogdoches Generating Facility began its commercial operation. The facility is a 115 MW biomass-fueled electric generating plant, located near Sacul in Nacogdoches County, Texas.

In 2016, Southern Company acquired PowerSecure, a distributed energy infrastructure technologies company, and AGL Resources (which was renamed Southern Company Gas). The takeover of AGL was valued at $12 billion, including $8 billion of equity. As a result of the AGL Resources merger, Southern Company doubled its customer base to approximately 9 million and expanded its footprint and broadened the scope of its business by increasing its natural gas presence. In 2018, Southern Company sold Gulf Power and its gas plant shares of 100% in Plant Oleander and 65% in Stanton Energy Center to NextEra for $6.5 billion.

In September 2023, it was announced Southern Company's subsidiary, Southern Power had acquired the 200MW Millers Branch Solar Facility in Haskell County, Texas from EDF Renewables North America, for an undisclosed amount.

In February 2026, the United States Department of Energy (DOE) awarded a $26.54 billion loan to Southern Company, the largest loan in DOE's history. The loan will finance 16 GW of power, including about 5 GW of new natural gas generation, 6 GW of nuclear upgrades and license renewals, hydropower modernization, battery energy storage systems, and 1,300 miles of transmission infrastructure and grid enhancement projects. The loan will be split between subsidiaries Georgia Power receiving $22.4 billion and Alabama Power receiving $4.1 billion.

== Governance ==
=== Board of directors ===
- Christopher C. Womack – Chairman of the Board, President and CEO
- Janaki Akella
- Shantella E Cooper
- David J. Grain
- Donald M. James
- John D. Johns

=== Executive management ===
- Christopher C. Womack – Chairman of the Board, President and CEO
- Bryan Anderson – Executive Vice President and President of External Affairs
- David P. Poroch – Executive Vice President and CFO
- Stan W. Connally, Jr. – Executive Vice President and COO
- Chris Cummiskey – Executive Vice President and CCO
- Martin B. Davis – Executive Vice President and CIO
- Sloane Drake – Executive Vice President and CHRO

== Plant Vogtle ==
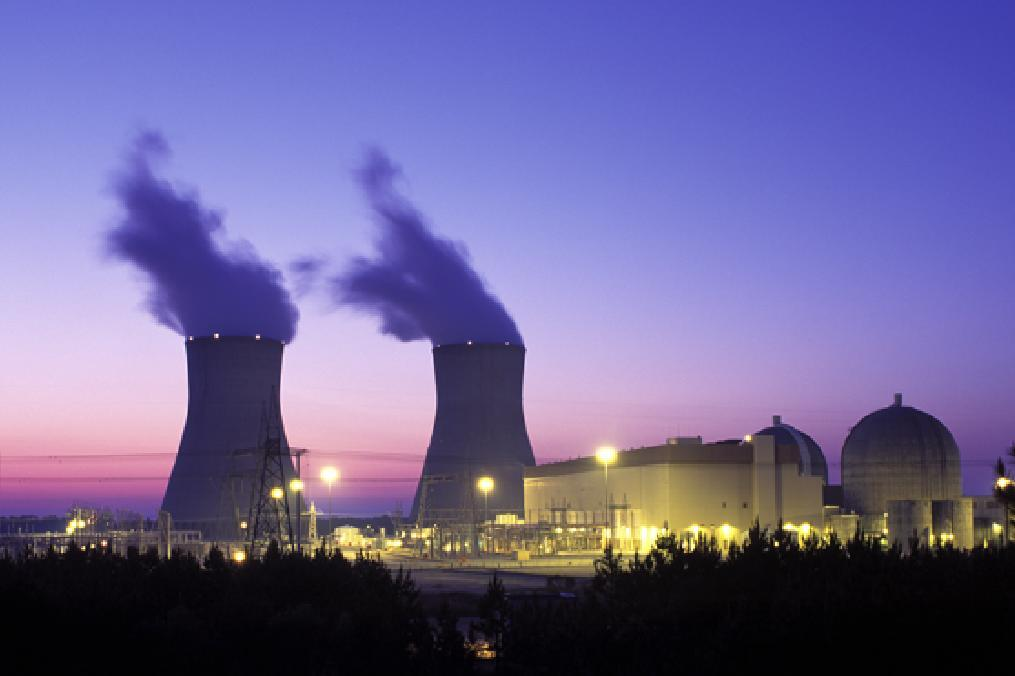
Plant Vogtle in Georgia. Southern Company and its partners are constructing two new units on this site by 2022.

Southern Company subsidiaries operate hydroelectric, gas, coal, and nuclear generation sources to generate approximately 200 terawatt-hours of electricity. In 2009, coal represented 57 percent of the company's output, followed by nuclear (23%) and natural gas (16%). Renewable hydroelectric power represented 4 percent of Southern's generation. Coal-based generation dropped significantly in 2009 from an average of 70% between 2005 and 2008. As of 2017 Coal-based generation had dropped to 30%.

In June 2010, the United States Department of Energy awarded an $8.3 billion loan guarantee to facilitate the construction of two new nuclear reactors at Plant Vogtle, near Augusta, Georgia. A Southern Company subsidiary, Georgia Power, owns 45.7% of the current 2,430 MW facility, with co-owners Oglethorpe Power (30%) Municipal Electric Authority of Georgia (22.7%) and the City of Dalton (1.6%). The plant is operated by Georgia Power. The $14 billion construction project is scheduled to be completed by 2022 and would double the plant's capacity.

The construction of two 1,154 MW reactors has been hailed by Energy Secretary Steven Chu as "the first new nuclear power plant to break ground in decades". It is expected to create up to 3,500 jobs during the construction phase, and 800 once operational. However, in March 2017 Westinghouse Electric Company, who were building the plant, filed for Chapter 11 bankruptcy because of $9 billion of losses from its two U.S. nuclear construction projects. The U.S. government had given $8.3 billion of loan guarantees on the financing of the four nuclear reactors being built in the U.S., and it is expected a way forward to completing the plant can be agreed.

Commercial operations of the plant’s Unit 3 began in July 2023, while Unit 4’s commercial operations began in April 2024. The added reactors will supply enough energy for about 1 million customers.

== Plant Ratcliffe ==
In September 2013 the EPA introduced new provisions regarding output of carbon emissions in new power facilities. The proposed emission limit for new energy sources will be 1,100lbs of carbon dioxide per megawatt hour of electricity. Preemptively recognizing the need for these changes, Southern Company broke ground on its 21st-century clean coal facility in June 2010. Southern's subsidiary, Mississippi Power will operate the plant. The Kemper County Energy Facility, or Kemper Project, takes advantage of the abundant lignite, or poor quality coal, available in Mississippi. Additionally, it employs Transport Gasifier (TRIG) technology. TRIG technology is built on the idea of dry-feed, non-slag gasifiers, which operate at lower temperatures than other coal gasifiers. This dry-feed is crushed, heated, and circulated in the gasifier, producing a flammable synthetic gas, syngas. Syngas can generate electricity with fewer emissions. Of course, other byproducts are produced, like ammonia and sulfuric acid. These particular products are sold for commercial use.

The EPA considers the Kemper Coal Project and other planned facilities like it, to be a lifeline for the coal industry in the wake of the new climate change plan. Between 2010 and 2014, approximately 150 coal plants were shut down.

As of April 2014, the US Department of Energy had invested $270m in this project. Southern Company, and its subsidiary, Mississippi Power anticipate that the Kemper Coal Plant will generate enough energy to serve more than 187,000 customers. Upon opening, the Kemper Coal Project is expected to be capable of stripping out at least 65% of the carbon dioxide, significantly exceeding the EPA's proposed requirement of 40%.

== Partnerships ==
Southern Company works with the U.S. Department of Energy on a variety of projects including transmission and distribution of infrastructure and smart grid initiatives, environmental research programs, and nuclear generation. One of the more significant joint efforts, the DOE's National Carbon Capture Center, is managed by Southern Company and represents national efforts to reduce greenhouse gas emissions from coal-based power generation. At this location, Southern Company has been working with scientists and technology developers from government, industry, and universities who are creating the next generation of carbon capture technologies.

Along with the DOE, Southern Company has been working with KBR, another technology partner, to perfect its TRIG advanced coal gasification technology. This process of breaking down "dirty coal", or lignite, into its chemical components is not only cleaner, but it is also less expensive and more reliable. This technology is currently being implemented at Southern Company's Kemper County power plant, one of the few new coal facilities working to keep the U.S. coal industry alive. This new facility will be built on a lignite seam, is expected to strip out two-thirds of carbon dioxide emissions, leaving emissions at about the same level as natural gas. The Kemper Coal Plant is expected to fall well under new regulations implemented by the EPA, which limits coal plants to 1,100lbs of carbon dioxide emissions per megawatt hour of electricity.

In an effort to make this technology more attainable, Southern Company has partnered with China's Shenhua Group to collaborate on further research, development, and deployment of clean coal technologies in the US, China, and around the world. This partnership with Shenhua, who is currently expected to add more than 400,000 megawatts of coal-fired capacity by 2035, could lead to wide deployment of TRIG-equipped power plants across Asia. TRIG technology has the potential to not only assist China with their growing carbon issue, but also enable the country to tap into their own low quality coal.

In 2009, the U.S. Department of Energy granted Southern Company a $165 million Smart Grid Investment Grant to implement a smart grid and to make the grid more reliable. Through matching funds and other investments, the company spent $363 million on the initiative, which it completed in 2014. The upgraded smart grid allows Southern Company the ability to monitor and control its electric infrastructure in real time and respond to problems.

== Financial data ==
Financial data in $ millions
Year	2005	2006	2007	2008	2009	2010	2011	2012	2013	2014	2015	2016	2017	2018	2019	2020	2021	2022
Revenue	13,554	14,356	15,353	17,127	15,743	17,456	17,657	16,537	17,087	18,467	17,489	19,896	23,031	23,495	21,419	20,375	23,113	29,279
Net income	1,591	1,573	1,734	1,742	1,643	1,975	2,203	2,350	1,644	1,963	2,367	2,448	842	2,226	4,739	3,119	2,393	3,524
Assets	39,877	42,858	45,789	48,347	52,046	55,032	59,267	63,149	64,546	70,233	78,318	109,697	111,005	116,914	118,700	122,935	127,534	134,891
Employees									26,300	26,369	26,703	32,015	31,344	29,192	27,943	27,700	27,300	27,700

== Political donations ==
In May 2018, it was reported that Southern Company had donated $1 million to America First Policies, a pro-Donald Trump advocacy group.

== Controversies ==
=== Environmental impact ===
Southern Company is the third-largest producer of greenhouse gas emissions in the United States, emitting 86,244,286 metric tons of carbon dioxide equivalent in 2019. In 2005, the company announced it would open a Mercury Research Center at Plant Crist Pensacola, Florida, hoping to find new ways to reduce mercury emissions. On April 25, 2006, Alabama Power, a subsidiary of Southern Company, agreed to pay $200M to settle allegations that its coal-fired James H. Miller, Jr. Plant near West Jefferson, Alabama emitted harmful amounts of SO2 and NOx.

In response to growing public and financial community interest, the company has enacted assorted environmental measures. Southern Company participates in Renew Our Rivers, a volunteer program to remove debris from rivers and other waterways throughout the Southeast, which claims over 11 million pounds of trash removed or recycled in Renew Our Rivers events. The company also manages and operates the National Carbon Capture Center, a focal point of the US Department of Energy's efforts to develop carbon capture and greenhouse gas reduction technologies, under which various projects to test geologic sequestration are in progress at Plant Gorgas in Alabama, Plant Daniel in Mississippi and other company sites. However, critics have argued that CCS seldom works and prolongs the life of fossil fuels.

=== Climate change denial ===
Southern Company has a long history of funding climate change denial and has been a "driving force behind climate disinformation", sponsoring campaigns in opposition to climate science, against limiting greenhouse gas emissions, and slowing the transition to renewable energy sources.

Between 1993 and 2004 Southern Company paid over $62 million to organizations that spread disinformation about climate change. The utility paid for advertising claiming that climate change was not real and made payments to public relations companies, industry groups, law firms and thinktanks to dispute the scientific consensus for climate change and attack legislative solutions. The utility paid $20 million to the trade group Edison Electric Institute, which creates media campaigns to attack proponents of global warming. In the 1990s, Southern Company and the Center for Energy and Economic Development hosted energy workshops broadcast to schoolteachers through the company's satellite network to promote pro-coal messages about climate change and the environment.

Southern Company had spent more than $135 million from 2010 to 2020 on lobbying at a federal level.

=== Kemper Project controversies ===
In February 2015, the Mississippi Supreme Court ordered Southern Company's subsidiary Mississippi Power to restore $377 million to South Mississippi ratepayers for rate increases related to the Kemper Project, a "clean" coal plant. These fees were derived from Mississippi's Baseload Act, allowing Mississippi Power to charge ratepayers for powerplants under construction.

In May 2016, Southern Company and its subsidiary Mississippi Power announced they were being investigated by the Securities and Exchange Commission related to overruns at the Kemper Project. The project had been repeatedly delayed and costs increased from $2.88 billion to $6.58 billion. In recorded conversations, at least six engineers from the Kemper Project claimed that delays, cost overruns, safety violations, and shoddy work, were in part due to mismanagement or fraud.

In June 2016, Mississippi Power was sued by Treetop Midstream Services over the cancellation of a contract to receive carbon dioxide from the Kemper Project as part of the carbon capture and storage design. Treetop had contracted to buy carbon dioxide from the Kemper plant and had built a pipeline in preparation to receive the gas. Treetop alleged Mississippi Power had fraudulently and "intentionally misrepresenting and concealing the start date" for the Kemper Project, though Mississippi Power stated the suit was without merit.

The company was also found to have unlawfully fired a whistle-blower who had criticized alleged false statements by company management.

=== Vogtle nuclear power plant ===
In June 2021, Georgia Power, a subsidiary of Southern Company, was scrutinized by the Georgia Public Service Commission over the lengthy delays and ballooning costs of its new Vogtle nuclear plant in Burke County, Georgia.

=== Willie Soon ===
In February 2015, it was revealed that climate change denier Willie Soon had been paid by Southern Company and several other fossil fuel interest groups. Over the course of 14 years, Soon received a total of $1.25m from Southern Company, Exxon Mobil, the American Petroleum Institute (API) and a foundation run by the Koch brothers, the documents obtained by Greenpeace show. At $469,560, Southern Company was the largest donor. The scientist described his studies to fossil fuel executives as "deliverables", and permitted anonymous pre-publication reviews. Soon advanced the widely discredited theory that changes in solar activity are to blame for climate change, and called into question the severity and extent of climate change in all his studies, never revealing his backers.

== See also ==
- Jacob Horton
- List of United States electric companies
- Electric utility
