= Gulf Power Company =

Former electric utility company in Northwest Florida, U.S.

Gulf Power
- Gulf Power Logo as a NextEra subsidiary (2019-2022)
- Type: Subsidiary
- Industry: Utilities
- Founded: 1925
- Defunct: 2022
- Fate: Absorbed into Florida Power & Light
- Headquarters: 500 Bayfront Parkway, Pensacola, Florida, USA
- Area served: Northwest Florida
- Number of employees: 998
- Parent: Southern Company (1925-2019); NextEra Energy (2019-2022)

Gulf Power Company (GPC) was an American electric utility. Headquartered in Pensacola, Florida, it provided electricity to over 450,000 customers in 8 counties in the Florida panhandle. The company owned four power plants and a stake in two more, giving it a total generating capacity of 2.278 GW.

Gulf Power was founded in 1925 and was, for most of its life, a subsidiary of the Atlanta-based Southern Company. It was acquired by Juno Beach-based NextEra Energy, the parent company of Florida Power & Light, in 2019. In 2021, GPC was legally merged into Florida Power & Light, operating as a separate unit of FPL until early 2022. The former GPC territory is currently administered as FPL Northwest Division.

== Overview ==
Gulf Power had a service territory of 7,550 square miles (19,600 km^{2}) in eight counties: Bay, Escambia, Holmes, Jackson, Okaloosa, Santa Rosa, Walton, and Washington. The company owned 1,670 miles (2,690 km) of transmission lines and 7,750 miles (12,470 km) of distribution lines, 1,940 miles (3,120 km) of which were underground.

== History ==
- Feb. 10, 1925 – Southeastern Power and Light Company – a holding company which operates electric, gas, and street railway systems in Alabama, Georgia and Mississippi – purchases the Pensacola Electric Company.
- Oct. 29, 1925 – Gulf Power Company is organized as a Southeastern subsidiary.
- Feb. 6, 1926 – Gulf Power Company acquired the Chipley Light and Power Company and becomes a true operating public utility.
- Late 1926 – The Pensacola Electric Company merges into Gulf Power after being rescued from receivership by the holding company. Electricity during this period was very unreliable and erratic, and came from about 20 scattered and individually operating units. These generators were designed to supply power to ice plants, lumber yards and electric transit systems. In spite of northwest Florida’s poor economic state, Gulf Power had no choice but to modernize its equipment in order to continue operating.
- Sept. 6, 1926 – The Great Miami Hurricane hits Florida with 120 mph (190 km/h) winds and nine-foot storm surges, destroying nearly 4,000 rotting power poles and extinguishing fires in the old downtown Pensacola generating plant. As a result, more than 600 employees from sister companies work to restore service and install a more modern system. They restore power to the region in record time – within 65 days.
- Late 1926 – A 110,000 volt transmission line is built from the northern Alabama/Florida border to Pensacola, Florida – causing the old Allis-Chalmers steam turbine-generator to be placed on standby and therefore ending the era of local power generation. Gulf Power relies on imported energy for the next 39 years, even with an additional 7,366 customers inherited in 1926, and another 40,000 customers after World War II in the mid 1940s.
- 1945 – Gulf Power takes the first step toward producing its own electricity by building a 22-megawatt generating unit at the Crist Steam Plant in Pensacola, Florida, to help supply power after years of outages due to war shortages.
- Feb. 24, 2010 – Gulf Power breaks ground on a landfill gas facility at Escambia County's Perdido Landfill.
- Jun. 2014 – Gulf Power is sued by environmental organization Earthjustice for violating the Clean Water Act by improperly discharging coal ash at its Plant Scholz facility.
- Mar. 31, 2015 – Gulf Power decommissions two coal-fired units at its Lansing Smith Generating Plant near Panama City.
- Apr. 2015 – Plant Scholz, an 80-megawatt coal-fired plant, is closed after 60 years of service due to the expense of meeting newer EPA regulations. In the following months, the company settled with Earthjustice and agreed to undertake cleaning and containment activities at the facility.
- Aug. 22, 2017 – Gulf Power announces the completion of Gulf Coast Solar Center, three solar farms built on land leased from the U.S. military. The farms were developed in partnership with Coronal Energy, which would own and operate them. With the opening, 10% of Gulf Power's energy came from renewable energy sources.
- 2018 – NextEra Energy announces it will acquire Gulf Power from Southern Company. The acquisition was completed in Jan. 2019.
- Apr. 2020 – Gulf Power completes its first fully-owned solar field, the 75-megawatt Blue Indigo Solar Energy Center near Jacob City.
- Jan. 1, 2021 – Gulf Power is legally merged into Florida Power & Light. NextEra Energy will operate GPC as a separate division within FPL through 2021.
- Jan. 22, 2021 – Plant Crist is converted from coal to natural gas and renamed the Gulf Clean Energy Center.
- Early 2021 – FPL begins construction on the Blue Springs Solar Energy Center and Cotton Creek Solar Energy Center, two solar fields which had been planned by Gulf Power prior to the merger.

== Generating facilities ==
Plant	Location	Fuel	Units	Total capacity
Blue Indigo Solar Energy Center	Jacob City, Florida	Solar	–	75 MW
Gulf Clean Energy Center (Note: Formerly James F. Crist Electric Generating Plant)	Pensacola, Florida	Natural gas (Note: Originally a coal plant; coal units were shut down in 2021)	4	924 MW
Lansing Smith Generating Plant	Southport, Florida	Oil and natural gas (Note: Originally a coal plant; coal units were shut down in 2016)	2	645 MW (Note: 609 MW in summer)
Pea Ridge Facility	Pace, Florida	Natural gas	3	15 MW (Note: 12 MW in summer)
Perdido Landfill Gas-to-Energy Facility	Cantonment, Florida	Landfill gas	2	3 MW

=== Partially-owned ===
Plant	Location	Fuel	Ownership share	Other owners
Victor J. Daniel Electric Generating Plant, Units 1 & 2	Escatawpa, Mississippi	Coal	510 MW (50%) (Note: Ownership percentage is of specified units only)	Mississippi Power
Robert W. Scherer Power Plant, Unit 3	Juliette, Georgia	Coal	214 MW (25%)	Georgia Power

=== Leased ===
Plant	Location	Fuel	Leased capacity
Bay County Resource Recovery Facility	Panama City, Florida	Landfill gas	14 MW
Gulf Coast Solar Center I	Eglin Air Force Base (Valparaiso, Florida)	Solar	30 MW
Gulf Coast Solar Center II	Naval Outlying Landing Field Holley (Navarre, Florida)	Solar	40 MW
Gulf Coast Solar Center III	Saufley Field (Bellview, Florida)	Solar	50 MW
Kingfisher Wind I and II	Canadian County, Oklahoma	Wind	101 MW

=== Former ===
Plant	Decommissioned	Location	Fuel	Units	Total capacity
Herbert Scholz Generating Plant	2015	Sneads, Florida	Coal	2	80 MW

== See also ==
- List of power stations in Florida
