= Mississippi Power =

Investor-owned electric utility

- Type: Subsidiary
- Traded as: NYSE: MPJ
- Industry: Utilities
- Founded: 1925; 101 years ago
- Headquarters: Gulfport, Mississippi, United States
- Key people: Pedro Cherry (chairman, president & CEO)
- Number of employees: 1,253
- Website: mississippipower.com

Mississippi Power's previous logo

Mississippi Power, previously known as Mississippi Power Company (MPC), is an electric utility company. Its headquarters are in Gulfport, Mississippi, and it is a subsidiary of Atlanta-based, Southern Company.

Mississippi Power has more than 1,000 employees and serves most of the cities, towns, and communities within the 23 counties of southeast Mississippi. The utility also serves six Rural Electrification Administration-financed electric cooperatives: Coast EPA (Electric Power Association), Singing River EPA, Southern Pine EPA, Dixie EPA, Pearl River EPA, and East Mississippi EPA; and one municipality, City of Collins, with wholesale electric power, which, in turn, they resell to customers in southeast Mississippi. Based on public data from the U.S. Energy Information Administration, Mississippi Power's 2018 price of electricity to retail customers averaged 8.99 cents, compared to a national average of 10.58 cents.

== History ==
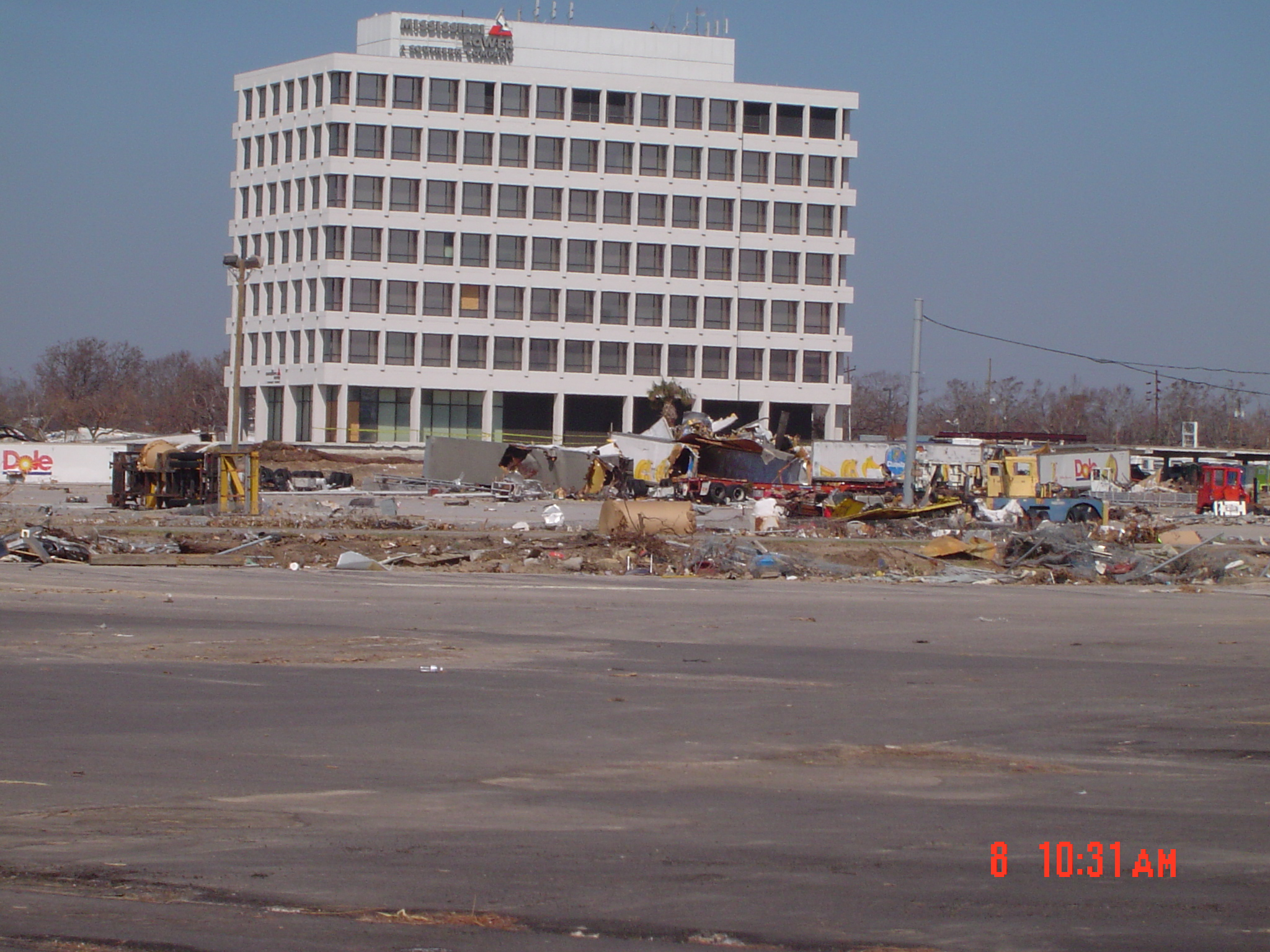
Mississippi Power offices in the days after Hurricane Katrina

Mississippi Power Company was founded in 1925. In 1949, Southern Company was established as a holding company for four utilities, one of which included Mississippi Power Company.

Formerly known as Mississippi Power Company from 1925 to 1976, the company shortened to Mississippi Power, and has maintained that name ever since.

=== Hurricane Katrina ===
August 29, 2005, Hurricane Katrina struck, taking down the company's electric systems and leaving every single customer without service. With a team of 12,000 - employees and crews from every state and Canada, they were able to restore service to all who could receive it in only 12 days. The severity of the storm has cautioned Mississippi Power with every future investment it has made. Most noticeably is the location of the Kemper Project, which was purposefully selected to be comfortably located miles from the Gulf. It is no wonder that the Kemper Project, officially named Plant Ratcliffe, was named after the 2005 Southern Company CEO, David Ratcliffe.

in 2007, Mississippi Power teamed with the Mississippi Department of Wildlife and Fisheries to begin restocking the Pascagoula River after Hurricane Katrina's massive fish kill by releasing more than 2,500 largemouth bass advanced fingerlings.

On the 20th anniversary of Hurricane Katrina, Mississippi Power Storm Director Stephen Schruff joined WXXV News 25 to discuss the days following the storm and what lessons were learned in the aftermath.

== Generating plants ==
=== Steam plants ===
Plant	Nearest city	Units	Capacity (MW)
A.J. Watson Electric Generating Plant	Gulfport, Mississippi	5	1,012
Victor J. Daniel Electric Generating Plant (Plant Daniel)	Escatawpa, Mississippi	4	1,580
Greene County Electric Generating Plant (40% ownership)	Demopolis, Alabama	2	200
Lonnie P. Sweatt Electric Generating Plant	Meridian, Mississippi	2	80
David Ratcliff Electric Generating Plant	Kemper County, Mississippi	1	770

=== Combustion turbines ===
Plant	Nearest city	Units	Capacity
Chevron Cogenerating Plant	Pascagoula, Mississippi	5	147,292 kW
Lonnie P. Sweatt Electric Generating Plant	Meridian, Mississippi	1	39,400 kW
Plant Watson	Gulfport, Mississippi	1	40,000 kW

=== Fuels used to generate electricity ===
Fuel	Cost of fuel	Percent generation
Coal	$271,992,000	51.00%
Natural gas	$260,033,000	49.00%

=== Transmission and distribution facilities ===
Mississippi Power maintains 147 substations, 2,118 miles of transmission lines, 4,213 miles of primary overhead lines and 560 miles of primary underground lines. Total generating capacity is 3,098,692 kW.

=== Former plants ===
The Eaton Electric Generating Plant was a three-unit natural gas-fired power plant located in Petal, Mississippi. Each of the three units generated 22.5 Megawatts (MW) of electricity, with a total plant capacity of 67.5 MW. The plant drew cooling water from the Leaf River.

Named for Barney Eaton, Mississippi Power's first president, the plant was the first high-pressure steam plant in the state of Mississippi and the first plant built by Mississippi Power Company. Plant Eaton made headlines when it was built in 1945, as it was the largest and most modern plant of its day. The first unit came on line on March 22, 1945.

Originally, Plant Eaton was intended to generate electricity to aid the United States in production of materials for World War II; however, the plant's largest contribution turned out to be producing power for the boom in electricity demanded following the war. As of the late 1990s, its use was limited to meeting peak demands during the summer.

Plant Eaton was closed down in 2012 due to declining efficiency. The plant was demolished in 2014.

== Kemper Project ==
Mississippi Power is currently constructing the Kemper County energy facility, commonly shortened to the Kemper Project, in Kemper County, Mississippi. Construction began in June 2010. The Kemper Project was intended to use an integrated gasification combined cycle (IGCC) to convert lignite coal to gas. Lignite, an abundant natural resource in Mississippi and commonly referred to as "brown coal", is very low grade coal. To meet increasing energy demands, Mississippi Power and the Department of Energy invested in technology to turn lignite coal into a viable energy source. The Kemper Project hoped to capture 65% of the carbon dioxide emissions, a byproduct of the chemical gasification process. This technology is called carbon capture & sequestration (CCS).

The Kemper Coal Plant was built by Mississippi Power in order to diversify its energy portfolio. With the majority of its investments in natural gas (a fuel with high price fluctuation), they determined lignite would be a better long-term fuel source than natural gas.

The plant missed all its targets, and plans for "clean coal" generation were abandoned in July 2017. The plant is expected to go ahead burning natural gas only.

=== Mississippi Power Supreme Court Ruling ===
In February 2015, the Supreme Court of Mississippi found the agreement to raise rates during construction of the plant between the Mississippi Public Service Commission (MPSC) and Mississippi Power to be unlawful. The court cited the MPSC's failure to give proper notice to the public about the rate increase as one of the main reasons for the 5–4 ruling. Mississippi Power disagreed with the ruling, and officially announced that it planned to file for a rehearing. The original basis for the agreement between MPSC and Mississippi Power in March 2013 was a result of powers granted in the state's 2008 Baseload Act. This act allows public utilities to collect Construction Work in Progress (CWIP) funds to encourage long term investments by public utility companies.

=== Additional names for Kemper Project ===
- Plant Ratcliffe
- Kemper Coal Project
- Kemper County energy facility
- Kemper IGCC Plant
- Kemper CCS
- Kemper Plant
- Kemper Power Plant
