= Carbon capture and storage =

Process of capturing and storing carbon dioxide from industrial flue gas

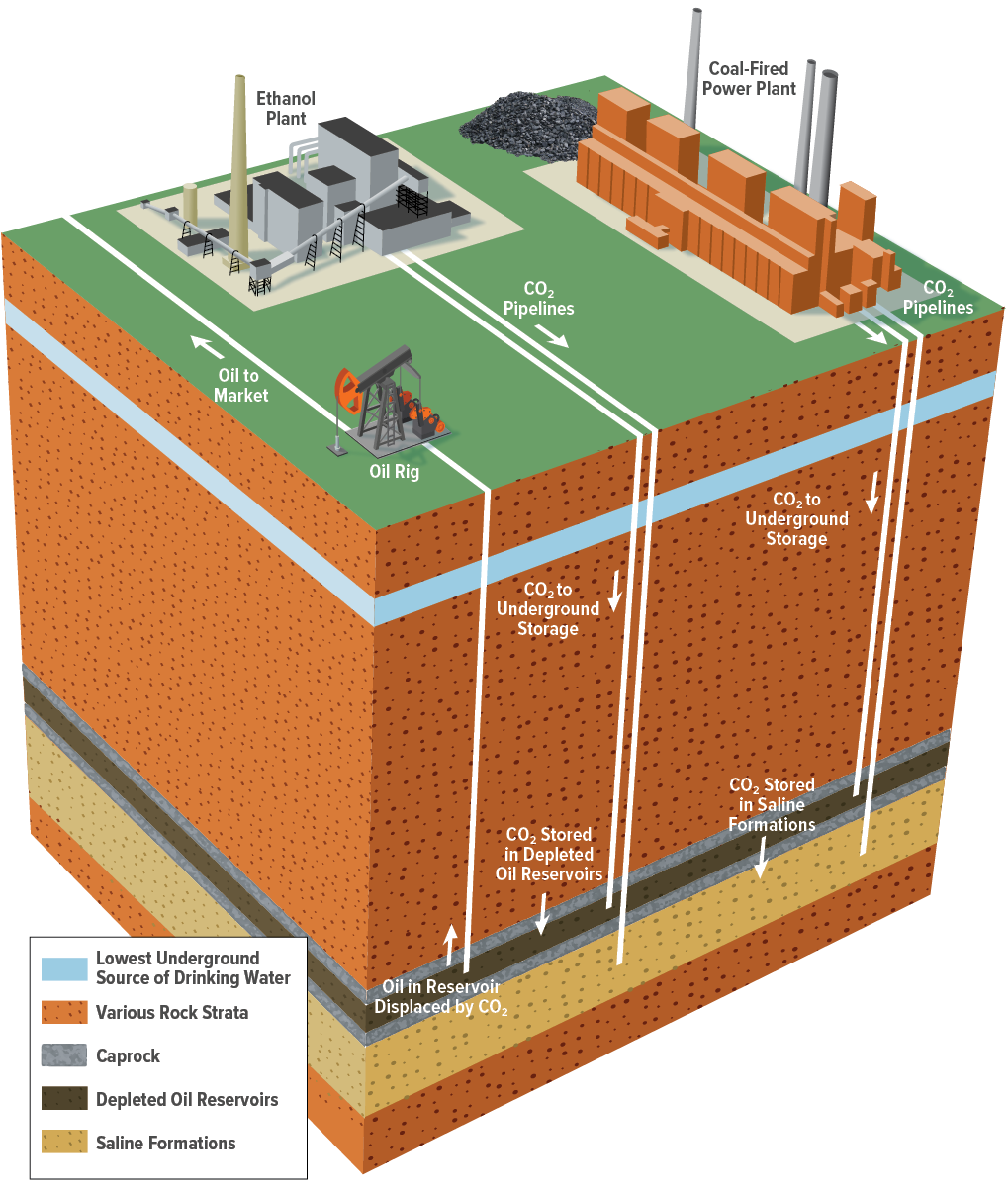
With CCS, carbon dioxide is captured from a point source, such as an ethanol refinery. It is usually transported via pipelines and then either used to extract oil or stored in a dedicated geologic formation.

Carbon capture and storage (CCS) is a process by which carbon dioxide (CO_{2}) from industrial installations or natural sources is separated before it is released into the atmosphere, then transported to a long-term storage location. The CO_{2} is captured from a large point source, such as a natural gas processing plant and is typically stored in a deep geological formation. Around 80% of the CO_{2} captured annually is used for enhanced oil recovery (EOR), a process by which CO_{2} is injected into partially depleted oil reservoirs in order to extract more oil and then is largely left underground. Since EOR utilizes the CO_{2} in addition to storing it, CCS is also known as carbon capture, utilization, and storage (CCUS).

Oil and gas companies first used the processes involved in CCS in the mid‑20th century. Early CCS technologies were mainly used to purify natural gas and increase oil production. From the 1980s, and especially in the 2000s, CCS began to be discussed as a strategy to reduce greenhouse gas emissions. A 2022 review found that around 70% of announced CCS projects had not materialized, with a failure rate above 98% in the electricity sector. As of 2024, CCS was in operation at 44 plants worldwide, collectively capturing about one‑thousandth of global carbon dioxide emissions, and about 90% of CCS operations involved the oil and gas industry. Plants with CCS require more energy to operate, so they typically burn additional fossil fuels and increase the pollution associated with extracting and transporting fuel.

CCS could have a critical but limited role in reducing greenhouse gas emissions. However, other emission-reduction options such as solar and wind energy, electrification, and public transit are less expensive than CCS and are much more effective at reducing air pollution. Given its cost and limitations, CCS is envisioned to be most useful in specific niches. These niches include heavy industry and plant retrofits. In the context of deep and sustained cuts in natural gas consumption, CCS can reduce emissions from natural gas processing. In electricity generation and hydrogen production, CCS is envisioned to complement a broader shift to renewable energy. CCS is a component of bioenergy with carbon capture and storage, which can under some conditions remove carbon from the atmosphere.

The effectiveness of CCS in reducing carbon emissions depends on the plant's capture efficiency, the additional energy used for CCS itself, leakage, and business and technical issues that can keep facilities from operating as designed. Some large CCS implementations have sequestered far less CO_{2} than originally expected. Controversy remains over whether using captured CO_{2} to extract more oil ultimately benefits the climate. Many environmental groups regard CCS as an unproven, expensive technology that perpetuates fossil fuel dependence. They believe other ways to reduce emissions are more effective and that CCS is a distraction.

Some international climate agreements refer to the concept of fossil fuel abatement, which is not defined in these agreements but is generally understood to mean use of CCS. Almost all CCS projects operating today have benefited from government financial support. Countries with programs to support or mandate CCS technologies include the US, Canada, Denmark, China, and the UK.

== Terminology ==
The Intergovernmental Panel on Climate Change (IPCC) defines CCS as:

"A process in which a relatively pure stream of carbon dioxide (CO_{2}) from industrial and energy-related sources is separated (captured), conditioned, compressed and transported to a storage location for long-term isolation from the atmosphere."

The terms carbon capture and storage (CCS) and carbon capture, utilization, and storage (CCUS) are closely related and often used interchangeably. Both terms have been used predominantly to refer to enhanced oil recovery (EOR) a process in which captured CO_{2} is injected into partially depleted oil reservoirs in order to extract more oil. EOR is both "utilization" and "storage", as the CO_{2} left underground is intended to be trapped indefinitely. Before 2013, the process was primarily called CCS. In 2013 the term CCUS was introduced to highlight its potential economic benefit, and this term subsequently gained popularity.

Around 1% of captured CO_{2} is used as a feedstock for making products such as fertilizer, fuels, and plastics. These uses are forms of carbon capture and utilization. In some cases, the product durably stores the carbon from the CO_{2} and thus is also considered to be a form of CCS. To qualify as CCS, carbon storage must be long-term, therefore using CO_{2} to produce fertilizer, fuel, or chemicals is not CCS because these products release CO_{2} when burned or consumed.

Some sources use the term CCS, CCU, or CCUS more broadly, encompassing methods such as direct air capture or tree-planting which remove CO_{2} from the air. In this article, the term CCS is used according to the IPCC's definition, which requires CO_{2} to be captured from point-sources such as a natural gas processing plant.

DOCCS means Direct Ocean Carbon Capture and Storage.

== History and current status ==
Global capture capacity has trended higher since 2017.

The number of patents covering CCS technologies surged in the 2000s, but stalled or declined in the 2010s.

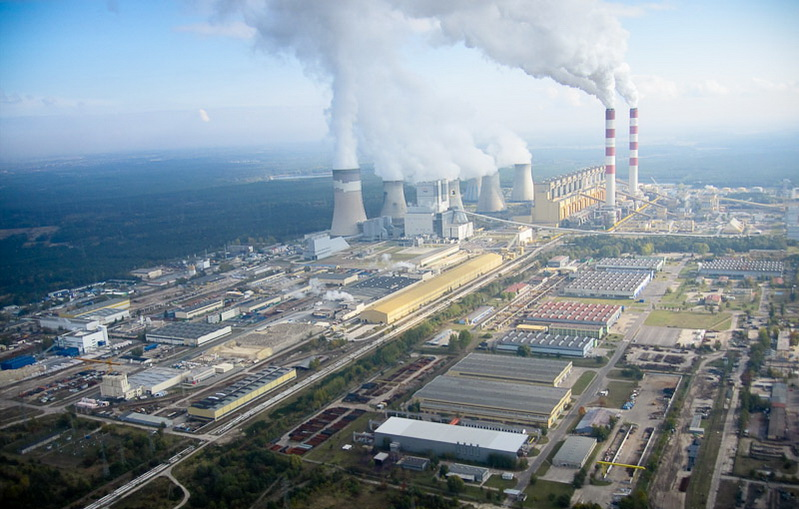
Plans to add CCS to Poland's Bełchatów Power Station were cancelled in 2013. Over 98% of plans to use CCS in power plants have failed.

In the natural gas industry, technology to remove CO_{2} from raw natural gas was patented in 1933. This processing is essential to make natural gas ready for commercial sale and distribution. Usually after CO_{2} is removed, it is vented to the atmosphere. In 1972, American oil companies discovered that CO_{2} could profitably be used for EOR. Subsequently, natural gas companies in Texas began capturing the CO_{2} produced by their processing plants and selling it to local oil producers for EOR.

The use of CCS as a means of reducing human-caused CO_{2} emissions is more recent. In 1977, the Italian physicist Cesare Marchetti proposed that CCS could be used to reduce emissions from coal power plants and fuel refineries. Small-scale implementations were first demonstrated in the early 1980s and an economic evaluation was published in 1991. The first large-scale CO_{2} capture and injection project with dedicated CO_{2} storage and monitoring was commissioned at the Sleipner gas field in Norway in 1996.

In 2005, the IPCC released a report highlighting CCS, leading to increased government support for CCS in several countries. Governments spent an estimated US$30 billion on subsidies for CCS and for fossil-fuel-based hydrogen. Globally, 149 projects to store 130 million tonnes of CO_{2} annually were proposed to be operational by 2020. Of these, around 70% were not implemented. Limited one-off capital grants, the absence of measures to address long-term liability for stored CO_{2}, high operating costs, limited social acceptability and vulnerability of funding programmes to external budget pressures all contributed to project cancellations.

In 2020, the International Energy Agency (IEA) stated, "The story of CCUS has largely been one of unmet expectations: its potential to mitigate climate change has been recognised for decades, but deployment has been slow and so has had only a limited impact on global CO_{2} emissions."

By July 2024, commercial-scale CCS was in operation at 44 plants worldwide. Sixteen of these facilities were devoted to separating naturally occurring CO_{2} from raw natural gas. Seven facilities were for hydrogen, ammonia, or fertilizer production, seven for chemical production, five for electricity and heat, and two for oil refining. CCS was also used in one iron and steel plant. Additionally, three facilities worldwide were devoted to CO_{2} transport/storage. As of 2024, the oil and gas industry is involved in 90% of CCS capacity in operation around the world. Collectively, the facilities capture about one-thousandth of global greenhouse gas emissions.

Eighteen facilities were in the United States, fourteen in China, five in Canada, and two in Norway. Australia, Brazil, Qatar, Saudi Arabia, and the United Arab Emirates had one project each. As of 2020, North America has more than 8,000 km (5,000 mi) of CO_{2} pipelines, and there are two CO_{2} pipeline systems in Europe and two in the Middle East.

== Process overview ==
CCS facilities capture carbon dioxide before it enters the atmosphere. Generally, a chemical solvent or a porous solid material is used to separate the CO_{2} from other components of a facility's exhaust stream. Most commonly, the gas stream passes through an amine solvent, which binds to the CO_{2} molecule. This CO_{2}-rich solvent is heated in a regeneration unit to release the CO_{2} from the solvent. The CO_{2} stream then undergoes conditioning to remove impurities and bring the gas to an appropriate temperature for compression. The purified CO_{2} stream is compressed and transported for storage or end-use and the released solvents are recycled to capture more CO_{2} from the facility.

After the CO_{2} has been captured, it is usually compressed into a supercritical fluid and then injected underground. Pipelines are the cheapest way of transporting CO_{2} in large quantities onshore and, depending on the distance and volumes, offshore. Transport via ship has been researched. CO_{2} can also be transported by truck or rail, albeit at higher cost per tonne of CO_{2}.

== Technical components ==
Patents for CCS

CCS processes involve several different technologies working together. Technological components are used to separate and treat CO_{2} from a gas mixture, compress and transport the CO_{2}, inject it into the subsurface, and monitor the overall process.

There are three ways that CO_{2} can be separated from a gas mixture: post-combustion capture, pre-combustion capture, and oxy-combustion:

- In post combustion capture, the CO_{2} is removed after combustion of the fossil fuel.
- The technology for pre-combustion is widely applied in natural gas processing. In these cases, the fossil fuel is partially oxidized, for instance in a gasifier. The CO from the resulting syngas (CO and H_{2}) reacts with added steam (H_{2}O) and is shifted into CO_{2} and H_{2}. The resulting CO_{2} can be captured from a relatively pure exhaust stream. The H_{2} can be used as fuel. Several advantages and disadvantages apply versus post combustion capture.
- In oxy-fuel combustion the fuel is burned in pure oxygen instead of air. The gas that is released consists of mostly CO_{2} and water vapor. After water vapor is condensed through cooling, the result is an almost pure CO_{2} stream. A disadvantage of this technique is that it requires a relatively large amount of oxygen, which is expensive and energy-intensive to produce.

Absorption, or carbon scrubbing with amines is the dominant capture technology. Other technologies proposed for carbon capture are membrane gas separation, chemical looping combustion, calcium looping, and use of metal-organic frameworks and other solid sorbents.

Impurities in CO_{2} streams, like sulfur dioxides and water vapor, can have a significant effect on their phase behavior and could cause increased pipeline and well corrosion. In instances where CO_{2} impurities exist, a process is needed to remove them.

== Storage and enhanced oil recovery ==
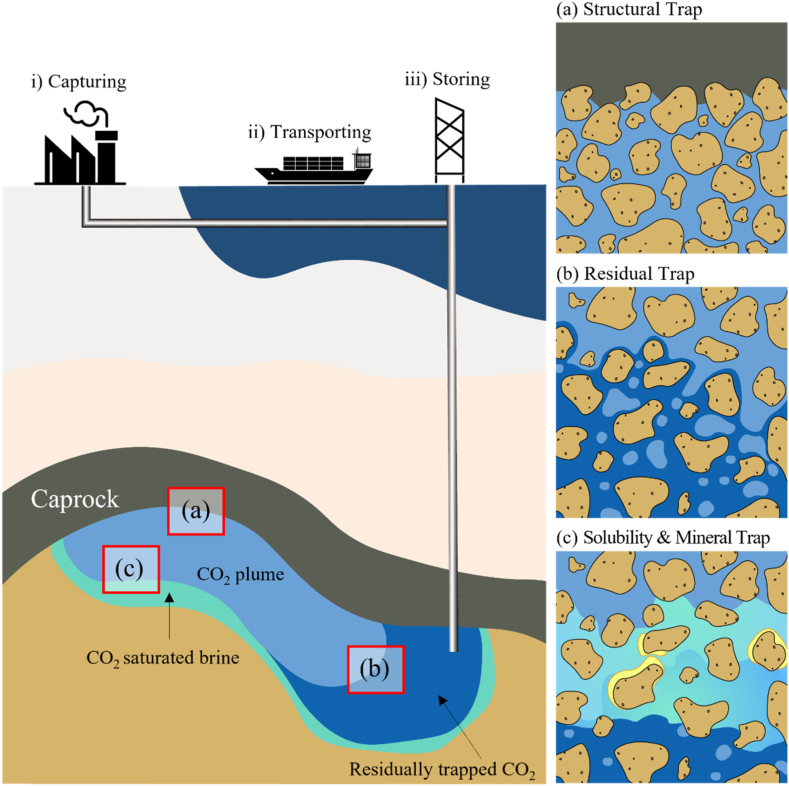
Diagram of mechanisms for trapping carbon dioxide in dedicated geologic storage

Storing CO_{2} involves the injection of captured CO_{2} into a deep underground geological reservoir of porous rock overlaid by an impermeable layer of rocks, which seals the reservoir and prevents the upward migration of CO_{2} and escape into the atmosphere. The gas is usually compressed first into a supercritical fluid. When the compressed CO_{2} is injected into a reservoir, it flows through it, filling the pore space. The reservoir must be at depths greater than 800 m (2,600 ft) to retain the CO_{2} in a fluid state.

As of 2024, around 80% of the CO_{2} captured annually is used for enhanced oil recovery (EOR). In EOR, CO_{2} is injected into partially depleted oil fields to enhance production. The CO_{2} binds with oil to make it less dense, allowing oil to rise to the surface faster. The addition of CO_{2} also increases the overall reservoir pressure, thereby improving the mobility of the oil, resulting in a higher flow of oil towards the production wells. Depending on the location, EOR results in around two additional barrels of oil for every tonne of CO_{2} injected into the ground and using that oil produces approximately one tonne of CO_{2}. Oil extracted through EOR is mixed with CO_{2}, which can then mostly be recaptured and re-injected multiple times. This CO_{2} recycling process can reduce losses to 1%; however, it is energy-intensive.

Around 20% of captured CO_{2} is injected into dedicated geological storage, usually deep saline aquifers. These are layers of porous and permeable rocks saturated with salty water. Worldwide, saline formations have higher potential storage capacity than depleted oil wells. Dedicated geologic storage is generally less expensive than EOR because it does not require a high level of CO_{2} purity and because suitable sites are more numerous, which means pipelines can be shorter.

Various other types of reservoirs for storing captured CO_{2} were being researched or piloted as of 2021: CO_{2} could be injected into coal beds for enhanced coal bed methane recovery. Ex-situ mineral carbonation involves reacting CO_{2} with mine tailings or alkaline industrial waste to form stable minerals such as calcium carbonate. In-situ mineral carbonation involves injecting CO_{2} and water into underground formations that are rich in highly-reactive rocks such as basalt. There, the CO_{2} may react with the rock to form stable carbonate minerals relatively quickly. Once this process is complete, the risk of CO_{2} escape from carbonate minerals is estimated to be close to zero.

The global capacity for underground CO_{2} storage is potentially very large and is unlikely to be a constraint on the development of CCS. Total storage capacity has been estimated at between 8,000 and 55,000 gigatonnes. However, a smaller fraction will most likely prove to be technically or commercially feasible. Global capacity estimates are uncertain, particularly for saline aquifers where more site characterization and exploration is still needed.

=== Long-term CO_{2} leakage ===
In geologic storage, the CO_{2} is held within the reservoir through several trapping mechanisms: structural trapping by an impermeable rock layer called a caprock, solubility trapping in pore space water, residual trapping in individual or groups of pores, and mineral trapping by reacting with the reservoir rocks to form carbonate minerals. Mineral trapping progresses over time but is extremely slow.

After injection, supercritical CO_{2} tends to rise until it is trapped beneath a caprock. Once it encounters a caprock, it spreads laterally until it encounters a gap. If there are fault planes near the injection zone, CO_{2} could migrate along the fault to the surface, leaking into the atmosphere, which would be potentially dangerous to life in the surrounding area. If the injection of CO_{2} creates pressures underground that are too high, the formation will fracture, potentially causing an earthquake. While research suggests that earthquakes from injected CO_{2} would be too small to endanger property, they could be large enough to cause a leak.

According to the IPCC, well-managed storage sites likely retain over 99% of injected CO_{2} for more than a thousand years, where 'likely' means a 66–90% probability. Estimates of long-term leakage rates rely on complex simulations since field data is limited. If very large amounts of CO_{2} are sequestered, even a 1% leakage rate over 1000 years could cause significant impact on the climate for future generations.

== Social and environmental impacts ==
=== Energy and water requirements ===
Facilities with CCS use more energy than those without CCS. The energy consumed by CCS is called an "energy penalty". The energy penalty of CCS varies depending on the source of CO_{2}. If the gas from the source has a very high concentration of CO_{2}, additional energy is needed only to dehydrate, compress, and pump the CO_{2}. If the facility produces gas with a lower concentration of CO_{2}, as is the case for power plants, energy is also required to separate CO_{2} from other gas components.

Early studies indicated that to produce the same amount of electricity, a coal power plant would need to burn 14–40% more coal and a natural gas combined cycle power plant would need to burn 11–22% more gas. When CCS is used in coal power plants, it has been estimated that about 60% of the energy penalty originates from the capture process, 30% comes from compression of the extracted CO_{2}, and the remaining 10% comes from pumps and fans.

Depending on the technology used, CCS can require large amounts of water. For instance, coal-fired power plants with CCS may need to use 50% more water.

=== Pollution ===
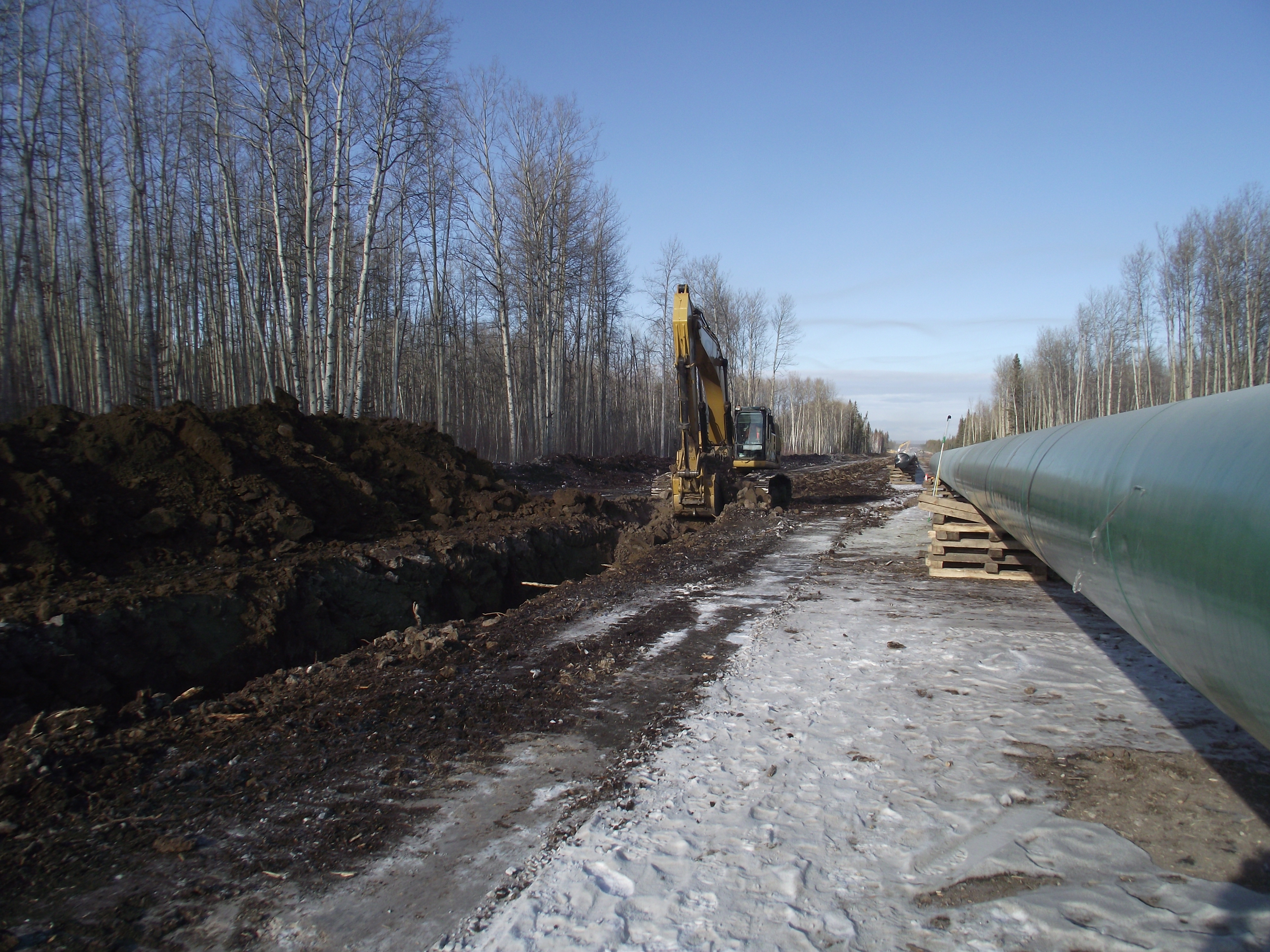
The construction of pipelines adversely affects wildlife. Pipeline construction is also associated with social harms to Indigenous communities.

Since plants with CCS require more fuel to produce the same amount of electricity or heat, the use of CCS increases the "upstream" environmental problems of fossil fuels. Upstream impacts include pollution caused by coal mining, emissions from the fuel used to transport coal and gas, emissions from gas flaring, and fugitive methane emissions.

Since CCS facilities require more fossil fuel to be burned, CCS can cause a net increase in air pollution from those facilities. This can be mitigated by pollution control equipment, however no equipment can eliminate all pollutants. Since liquid amine solutions are used to capture CO_{2} in many CCS systems, these types of chemicals can also be released as air pollutants if not adequately controlled. Among the chemicals of concern are volatile nitrosamines and nitramines which are carcinogenic when inhaled or drunk in water.

Studies that consider both upstream and downstream impacts indicate that adding CCS to power plants increases overall negative impacts on human health. The health impacts of adding CCS in the industrial sector are less well-understood. Health impacts vary significantly depending on the fuel used and the capture technology.

After CO_{2} injected into underground geologic formations, there is a risk of nearby shallow groundwater becoming contaminated. Contamination can occur either from movement of the CO_{2} into groundwater or from movement of displaced brine. Careful site selection and long-term monitoring are necessary to mitigate this risk.

=== Sudden CO_{2} leakage ===
Main symptoms of carbon dioxide toxicity

CO_{2} is a colorless and odorless gas that accumulates near the ground because it is heavier than air. In humans, exposure to CO_{2} at concentrations greater than 5% (50,000 parts per million) causes the development of hypercapnia and respiratory acidosis. Concentrations of more than 10% may cause convulsions, coma, and death. CO_{2} levels of more than 30% act rapidly leading to loss of consciousness in seconds.

Pipelines and storage sites can be sources of large accidental releases of CO_{2} that can endanger local communities. A 2005 IPCC report stated that "existing CO_{2} pipelines, mostly in areas of low population density, accident numbers reported per kilometre of pipeline are very low and are comparable to those for hydrocarbon pipelines." The report also stated that the local health and safety risks of geologic CO_{2} storage were "comparable" to the risks of underground storage of natural gas if good site selection processes, regulatory oversight, monitoring, and incident remediation plans are in place. As of 2020, the ways that pipelines can fail is less well-understood for CO_{2} pipelines than for natural gas or oil pipelines, and few safety standards exist that are specific to CO_{2} pipelines.

While infrequent, accidents can be serious. In 2020, a CO_{2} pipeline ruptured after a mudslide near Satartia, Mississippi, causing people nearby to lose consciousness. About 200 people were evacuated and 45 were hospitalized, and some experienced longer-term effects on their health. High concentrations of CO_{2} in the air also caused vehicle engines to stop running, hampering the rescue effort.

=== Jobs ===
Retrofitting facilities with CCS can help to preserve jobs and economic prosperity in regions that rely on emissions-intensive industry, while avoiding the economic and social disruption of early retirements.

=== Equity ===
In the United States, the types of facilities that could be retrofitted with CCS are often located in communities that have already borne the negative environmental and health effects of living near power or industrial facilities. These facilities are disproportionately located in poor and/or minority communities. While there is evidence that CCS can help reduce non-CO_{2} pollutants along with capturing CO_{2}, environmental justice groups are often concerned that CCS will be used to prolong a facility's life and continue the local harms it causes. Often, community-based organizations would prefer that a facility be shut down and for investment be focused instead on cleaner production processes, such as renewable electricity.

Construction of pipelines often involves setting up work camps in remote areas. In Canada and the United States, oil and gas pipeline construction in remote communities is associated with social harms including sexual violence, and this history has led some Indigenous communities to oppose construction of CO_{2} pipelines.

== Cost ==
Project cost, low technology readiness levels in capture technologies, and a lack of revenue streams are among the main reasons for CCS projects to stop. A commercial-scale project typically requires an upfront capital investment of up to several billion dollars.

The cost of CCS varies greatly by CO_{2} source. If the facility produces a gas mixture with a high concentration of CO_{2}, as is the case for natural gas processing, it can be captured and compressed for US$15–25/tonne. Power plants, cement plants, and iron and steel plants produce more dilute gas streams, for which the cost of capture and compression is US$40–120/tonne CO_{2}. In the United States, the cost of onshore pipeline transport is in the range of US$2–14/tonne CO_{2}, and more than half of onshore storage capacity is estimated to be available below US$10/tonne CO_{2}. CCS implementations involve multiple technologies that are highly customized to each site, which limits the industry's ability to reduce costs through learning-by-doing.

== Role in climate change mitigation ==
=== Comparison with other mitigation options ===
Compared to other options for reducing emissions, CCS is very expensive. For instance, removing CO_{2} in fossil fuel power plants increases costs by US$50–$200 per tonne of CO_{2} removed. There are many ways to reduce emissions that cost less than US$20 per tonne of avoided CO_{2} emissions. Options that have far more potential to reduce emissions at lower cost than CCS include public transit, electric vehicles, and various energy efficiency measures. Wind and solar power are often the lowest-cost ways to produce electricity, even when compared to power plants that do not use CCS. The dramatic fall in the costs of renewable power and batteries has made it difficult for fossil fuel plants with CCS to be cost-competitive, however the inherent intermittency and geographic dependency of these sources means that a complete phaseout of fossil fired generation may not always be feasible.

=== Priority uses ===
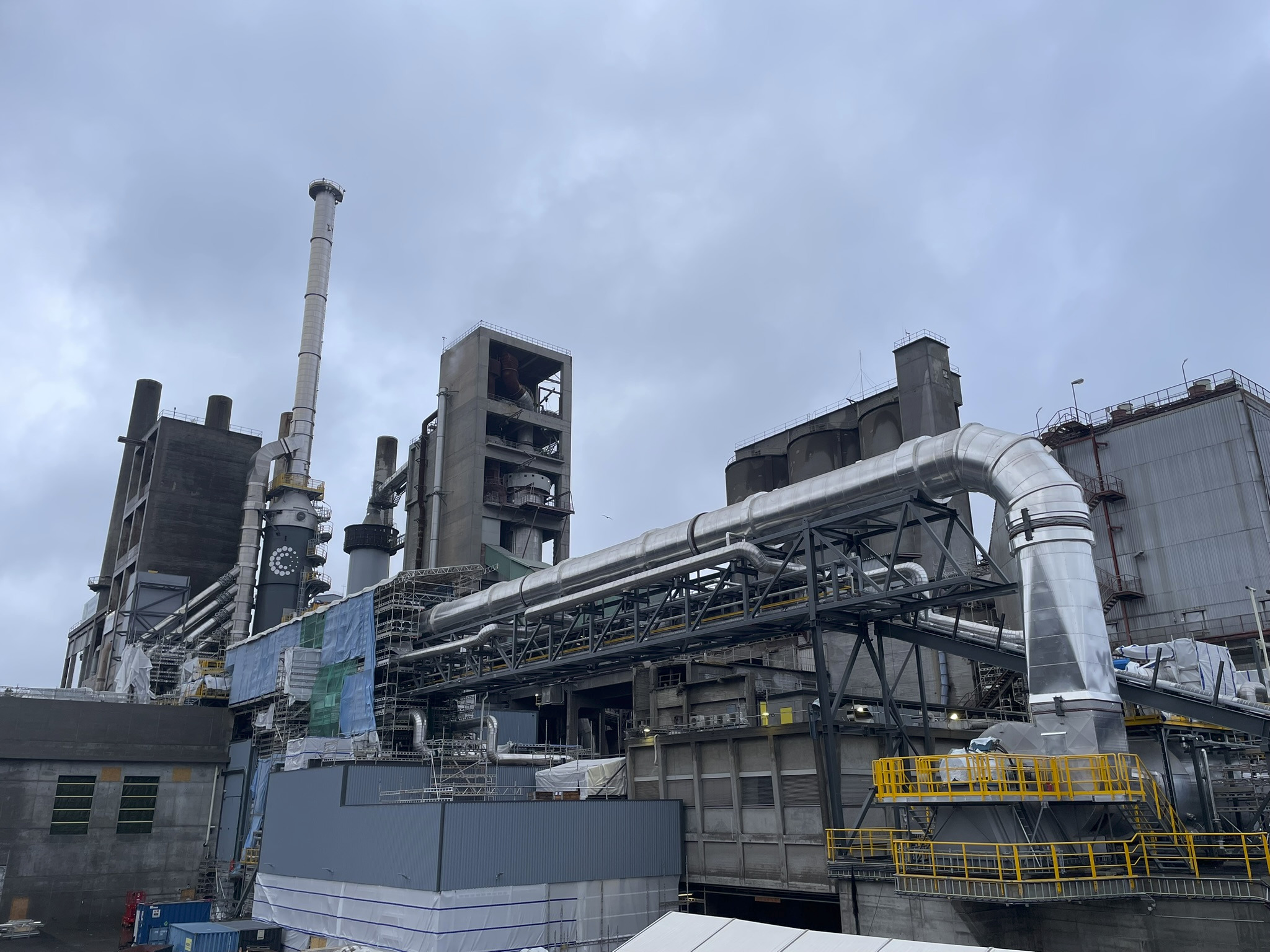
The Heidelberg Brevik Carbon Capture facility, scheduled to start operating in 2025, will be the first commercial-scale use of CCS in cement production.

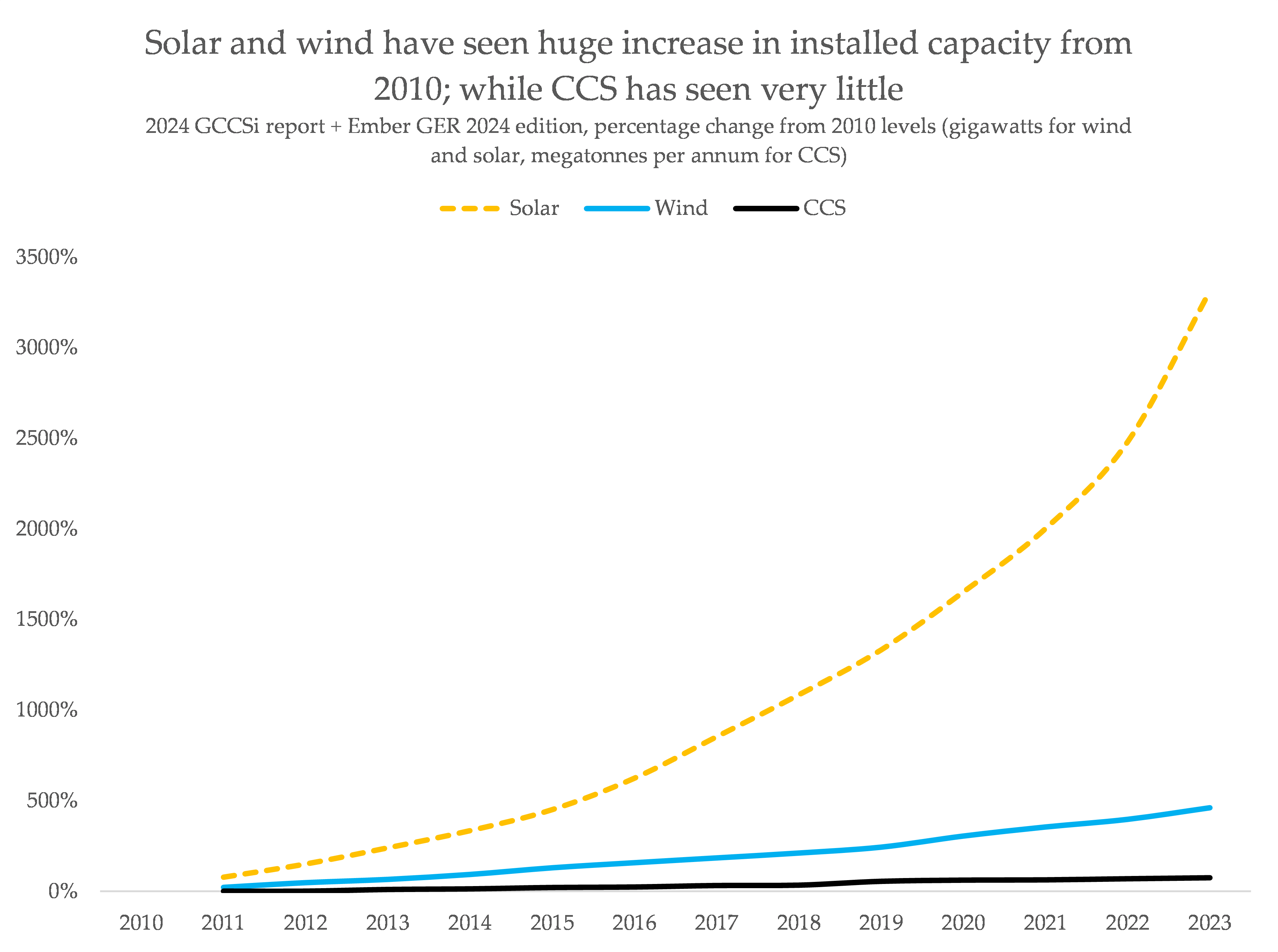
Compared to solar and wind power, CCS has seen relatively flat growth in installed capacity since 2010.

In the literature on climate change mitigation, CCS is described as having a small but critical role in reducing greenhouse gas emissions. The IPCC estimated in 2014 that forgoing CCS altogether would make it 138% more expensive to keep global warming within 2 degrees Celsius. Excessive reliance on CCS as a mitigation tool would also be costly and technically unfeasible. According to the IEA, attempting to abate oil and gas consumption only through CCS and direct air capture would cost US$3.5 trillion per year, which is about the same as the annual revenue of the entire oil and gas industry. Emissions are relatively difficult or expensive to abate without CCS in the following niches:

- Heavy Industry: CCS is one of the few available technologies that can significantly reduce emissions associated with the production of cement, chemicals, and steel. A portion of the CO_{2} emissions from these processes come from chemical reactions, in addition to emissions from burning fuels for heat. For example, approximately one third of emissions from cement making arise from burning fuels and two thirds arise from the chemical process. The Global Cement and Concrete Association say that CCS could reduce carbon emissions by 36%. Cleaner industrial processes are at varying stages of development and some have been commercialized, but are far from being widely deployed.
- Retrofits: CCS can be retrofitted to existing coal and natural gas power plants and industrial facilities to enable the continued operation of existing plants while reducing their emissions.
- Natural gas processing: CCUS is the only solution to reduce the CO_{2} emissions from natural gas processing. This does not reduce the emissions released when the gas is burned.
- Hydrogen: Nearly all hydrogen today is produced from natural gas or coal. Facilities can incorporate CCS to capture the CO_{2} released in these processes.
- Complement to renewable electricity: In the IEA's scenario for net zero emissions, 251 GW of electricity worldwide are produced by coal and gas plants equipped with CCS by 2050, while 54,679 GW of electricity are produced by solar PV and wind.Although solar and wind energy are typically cheaper, power plants that burn natural gas, biomass, or coal have the advantage of being able to produce electricity in any season and any time of day, and can be dispatched at times of high demand. A small amount of power plant capacity can help to meet the growing need for system flexibility as the share of wind and solar increases. The potential for a robust power grid using 100% renewable energy has been modelled as a feasible option for many regions, which would make fossil CCS in the electricity sector unnecessary. However, this approach may be more expensive. CO_{2}-Plume Geothermal is a proposed way to combine carbon storage with geothermal energy production.
- Bioenergy with carbon capture and storage: Bioenergy with carbon capture and storage (BECCS) is the process of extracting bioenergy from biomass and capturing and storing the CO_{2} that is produced. Under some conditions, BECCS can remove carbon dioxide from the atmosphere.

The IPCC stated in 2022 that "implementation of CCS currently faces technological, economic, institutional, ecological-environmental and socio-cultural barriers." Since CCS can only be used with large, stationary emission sources, it cannot reduce the emissions from burning fossil fuels in vehicles and homes. The IEA describes "excessive expectations and reliance" on CCS and direct air capture as a common misconception. To reach targets set in the Paris Agreement, CCS must be accompanied by a steep decline in the production and use of fossil fuels.

=== Effectiveness in reducing greenhouse gas emissions ===
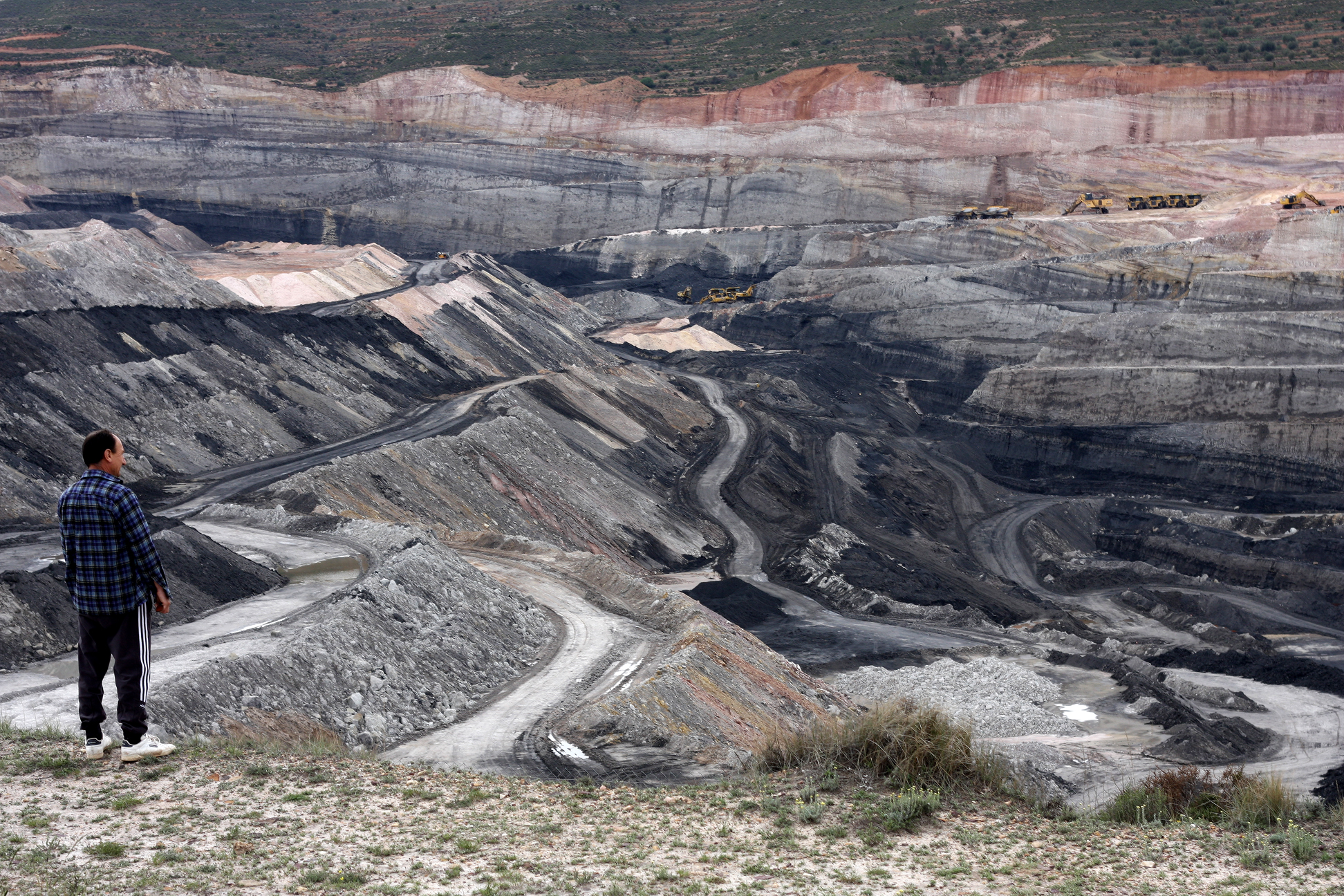
Coal plants with CCS usually burn more coal to provide the energy needed for CCS processes. This increases the environmental effects of coal mining.

When CCS is used for electricity generation, most studies assume that 85-90% of the CO_{2} in the exhaust stream is captured. However, industry representatives say actual capture rates are closer to 75%, and have lobbied for government programs to accept this lower target. The potential for a CCS project to reduce emissions depends on several factors in addition to the capture rate. These factors include the amount of additional energy needed to power CCS processes, the source of the additional energy used, and post-capture leakage. The energy needed for CCS usually comes from fossil fuels whose mining, processing, and transport produce emissions. Some studies indicate that under certain circumstances the overall emissions reduction from CCS can be very low, or that adding CCS can even increase emissions relative to no capture. For instance, one study found that in the Petra Nova CCS retrofit of a coal power plant, the actual rate of emissions reduction was so low that it would average only 10.8% over a 20-year time frame.

Some CCS implementations have not sequestered carbon at their designed capacity, either for business or technical reasons. For instance, in the Shute Creek Gas Processing Facility, around half of the CO_{2} that has been captured has been sold for EOR, and the other half vented to the atmosphere because it could not be profitably sold. In one year of operation of the Gorgon gas project in Australia, issues with subsurface water prevented two-thirds of captured CO_{2} from being injected. A 2022 analysis of 13 major CCS projects found that most had either sequestered far less CO_{2} than originally expected, or had failed entirely.

==== Emissions with enhanced oil recovery ====
There is controversy over whether carbon capture followed by enhanced oil recovery is beneficial for the climate. The EOR process is energy-intensive because of the need to separate and re-inject CO_{2} multiple times to minimize losses. If CO_{2} losses are kept at 1%, the energy required for EOR operations results in around 0.23 tonnes of CO_{2} emissions per tonne of CO_{2} sequestered.

Furthermore, when the oil that is extracted using EOR is subsequently burned, CO_{2} is released. If these emissions are included in calculations, carbon capture with EOR is usually found to increase overall emissions compared to not using carbon capture at all. If the emissions from burning extracted oil are excluded from calculations, carbon capture with EOR is found to decrease emissions. In arguments for excluding these emissions, it is assumed that oil produced by EOR displaces conventionally produced oil instead of adding to the global consumption of oil. A 2020 review found that scientific papers were roughly evenly split on the question of whether carbon capture with EOR increased or decreased emissions.

The International Energy Agency's model of oil supply and demand indicates that 80% of oil produced in EOR will displace other oil on the market. Using this model, it estimated that for each tonne of CO_{2} sequestered, burning the oil produced by conventional EOR leads to 0.13 tonnes of CO_{2} emissions (in addition to the 0.24 tonnes of CO_{2} emitted during the EOR process itself).

=== Pace of implementation ===
As of 2023 CCS captures around 0.1% of global emissions — around 45 million tonnes of CO_{2}. Climate models from the IPCC and the IEA show it capturing around 1 billion tonnes of CO_{2} by 2030 and several billions of tons by 2050. Technologies for CCS in high-priority niches, such as cement production, are still immature. The IEA notes "a disconnect between the level of maturity of individual CO_{2} capture technologies and the areas in which they are most needed."

CCS implementations involve long approval and construction times and the overall pace of implementation has historically been slow. As a result of the lack of progress, authors of climate change mitigation strategies have repeatedly reduced the role of CCS. Some observers such as the IEA call for increased commitment to CCS in order to meet targets. Other observers see the slow pace of implementation as an indication that the concept of CCS is fundamentally unlikely to succeed, and call for efforts to be redirected to other mitigation tools such as renewable energy.

== Political debate ==
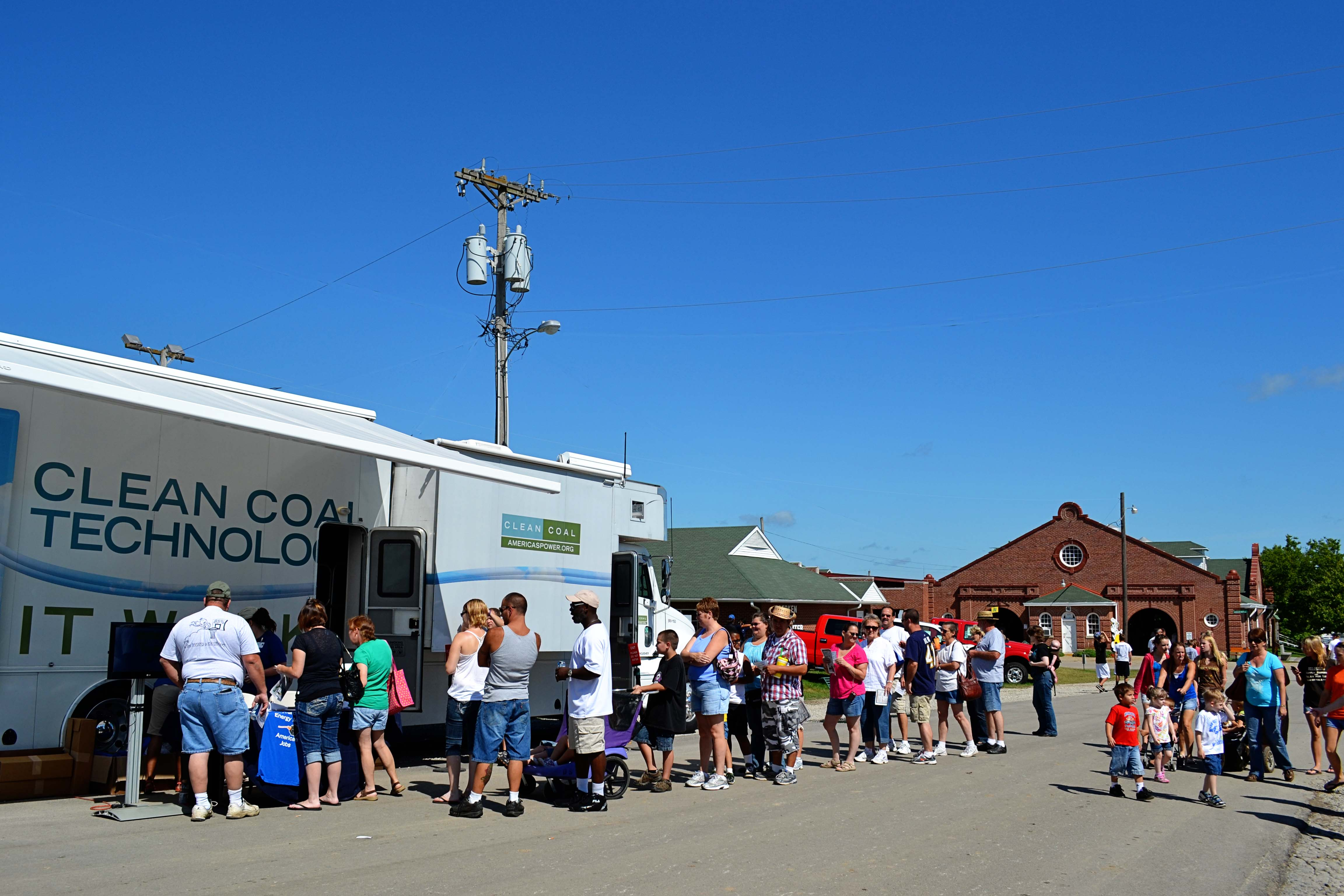
An information truck on "clean coal" from the American Coalition for Clean Coal Electricity, an advocacy group representing coal producers, utility companies and railroads.

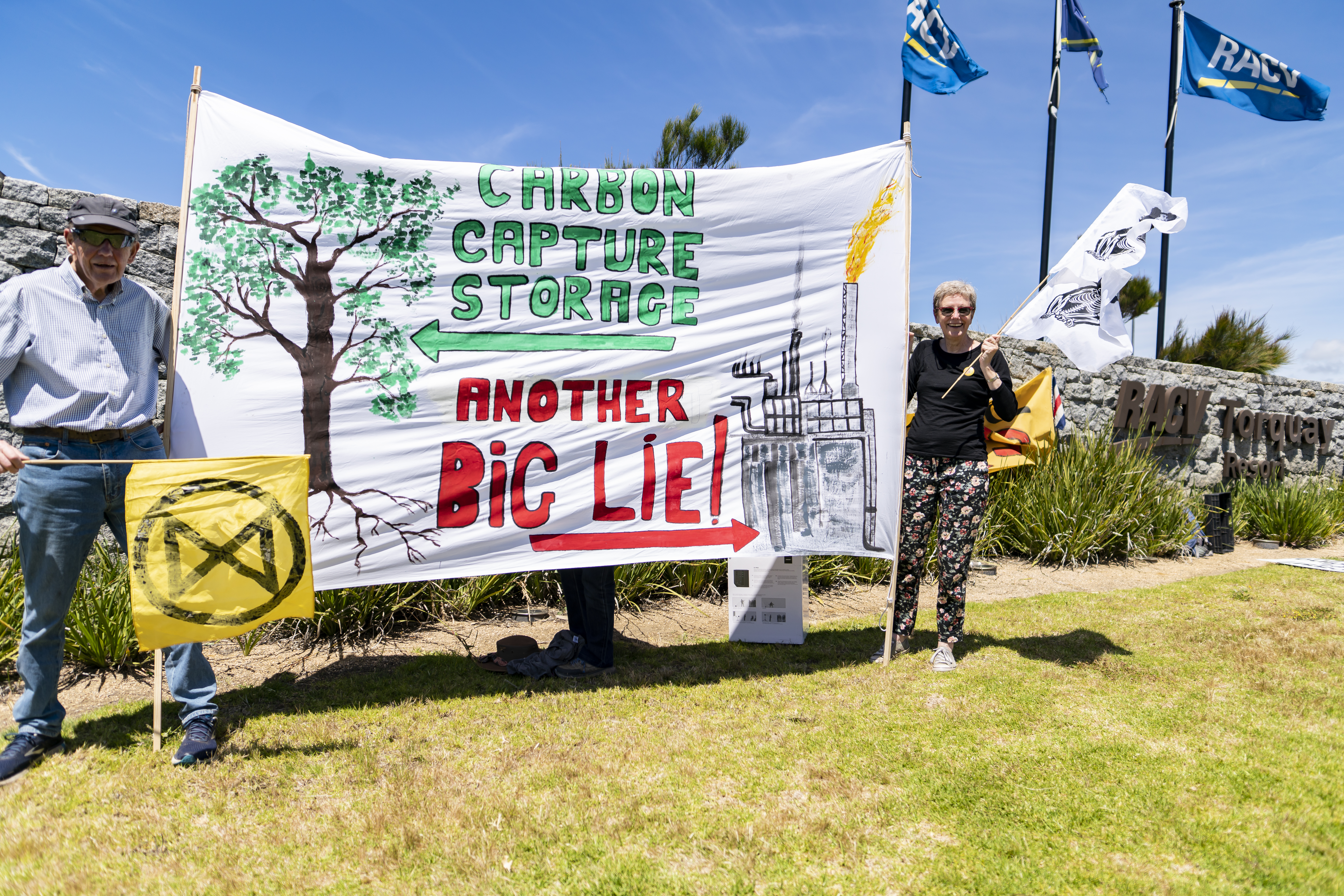
Protest against CCS in 2021 in Torquay, Australia

CCS has been discussed by political actors at least since the start of the UNFCCC negotiations in the beginning of the 1990s, and remains a very divisive issue.

Fossil fuel companies have heavily promoted CCS, framing it as an area of innovation and cost-effectiveness. Public statements from fossil fuel companies and fossil-based electric utilities ask for "recognition" that fossil fuel usage will increase in the future and suggest that CCS will allow the fossil fuel era to be extended. Their statements typically position CCS as a necessary way to tackle climate change, while not mentioning options for reducing fossil fuel use. According to the International Energy Agency, as of 2023, annual investments in the oil and gas sector are double the amount needed to produce the amount of fuel that would be compatible with limiting global warming to 1.5°C.

Fossil fuel industry representatives have had a strong presence at UN climate conferences. In these conferences, they have advocated for agreements to use language about reducing the emissions from fossil fuel use (through CCS), instead of language about reducing the use of fossil fuels. In the 2023 United Nations Climate Change Conference, at least 475 lobbyists for CCS were granted access.

Many environmental NGOs such as Friends of the Earth hold strongly negative views on CCS. In surveys, environmental NGOs' importance ratings for fossil energy with CCS have been around as low as their ratings for nuclear energy. Critics see CCS as an unproven, expensive technology that will perpetuate dependence on fossil fuels. They believe other ways to reduce emissions are more effective and that CCS is a distraction. They would rather see government funds go to initiatives that are not connected to the fossil fuel industry.

=== Fossil fuel abatement ===
In international climate negotiations, a controversial issue has been whether to phase out use of fossil fuels generally or to phase out use of "unabated" fossil fuels. In the 2023 United Nations Climate Change Conference, an agreement was reached to phase down unabated coal use. The term abated is generally understood to mean the use of CCS, however the agreement left the term undefined.

Since the terms abated and unabated were not defined, the agreement was criticized for being open to abuse. Without a clear definition, is possible for fossil fuel use to be called "abated" if it uses CCS only in a minimal fashion, such as capturing only 30% of the emissions from a plant.

The IPCC considers fossil fuels to be unabated if they are "produced and used without interventions that substantially reduce the amount of GHG emitted throughout the life-cycle; for example, capturing 90% or more from power plants, or 50–80% of fugitive methane emissions from energy supply." The intention of the IPCC definition is to require both effective CCS and deep reduction of fugitive gas emissions in order for fossil fuel emissions to qualify as being "abated."

== Social acceptance ==
The public has generally low awareness of CCS. Public support among those who are aware of CCS has tended to be low, especially compared to public support for other emission-reduction options.

A frequent concern for the public is transparency, e.g. around issues such as safety, costs, and impacts. Another factor in acceptance is whether uncertainties are acknowledged, including uncertainties around potentially negative impacts on the natural environment and public health. Research indicates that engaging comprehensively with communities increases the likelihood of project success compared to projects that do not engage the public. Some studies indicate that community collaboration can contribute to the avoidance of harm within communities impacted by the project.

== Government programs ==
Almost all CCS projects operating today have benefited from government financial support, largely in the form of capital grants and – to a lesser extent – operational subsidies. Tax credits are offered in some countries. Grant funding has played a particularly important role in projects coming online since 2010, with 8 out of 15 projects receiving grants ranging from around US$55 million (AUD 60 million) in the case of Gorgon in Australia to US$840 million (CAD 865 million) for Quest in Canada. An explicit carbon price has supported CCS investment in only two cases to date: the Sleipner and Snøhvit projects in Norway.

=== North America ===
As a means to help boost domestic oil production, the US federal tax code has had some sort of incentive for enhanced oil recovery since 1979, when crude oil was still under federal price controls. A 15 percent tax credit was codified with the U.S. Federal EOR Tax Incentive in 1986, and oil production from EOR using CO_{2} subsequently grew rapidly.

In the U.S., the 2021 Infrastructure Investment and Jobs Act designates over $3 billion for a variety of CCS demonstration projects. A similar amount is provided for regional CCS hubs that focus on the broader capture, transport, and either storage or use of captured CO_{2}. Hundreds of millions more are dedicated annually to loan guarantees supporting CO_{2} transport infrastructure.

The Inflation Reduction Act of 2022 (IRA) updates tax credit law to encourage the use of carbon capture and storage. Tax incentives under the law provide up to $85/tonne for CO_{2} capture and storage in saline geologic formations or up to $60/tonne for CO_{2} used for enhanced oil recovery. The Internal Revenue Service relies on documentation from the corporation to substantiate claims on how much CO_{2} is being sequestered, and does not perform independent investigations. In 2020, a federal investigation found that claimants for the 45Q tax credit failed to document successful geological storage for nearly $900 million of the $1 billion they had claimed.

In 2023, the US EPA issued a rule proposing that CCS be required in order to achieve a 90% emission reduction for existing coal-fired and natural gas power plants. That rule would become effective in the 2035–2040 time period. For natural gas power plants, the rule would require 90 percent capture of CO_{2} using CCS by 2035, or co-firing of 30% low-GHG hydrogen beginning in 2032 and co-firing 96% low-GHG hydrogen beginning in 2038. Within the US, although the federal government may fully or partially fund CCS pilot projects, local or community jurisdictions would likely administer CCS project siting and construction. CO_{2} pipeline safety is overseen by the Pipeline and Hazardous Materials Safety Administration, which has been criticized as being underfunded and understaffed.

Canada established a tax credit for CCS equipment for 2022–2028. The credit is 50% for CCS capture equipment and 37.5% for transportation and storage equipment. The Canadian Association of Petroleum Producers had asked for a 75% credit. The federal tax credit was expected to cost the government CAD $2.6 billion over 5 years; in 2024 the Parliamentary Budget Officer estimated it would cost CAD $5.7 billion. Saskatchewan extended its 20 per cent tax credit under the province's Oil Infrastructure Investment Program to pipelines carrying CO_{2}.

=== Europe ===
In Norway, CCS has been part of a strategy to make fossil fuel exports compatible with national emission-reduction goals. In 1991, the government introduced a tax on CO_{2} emissions from offshore oil and gas production. This tax, combined with favorable and well-understood site geology, was a reason Equinor chose to implement CCS in the Sleipner and Snøhvit gas fields. In June 2025, Norway also launched the world's largest full-scale operation of industrial carbon capture and storage.

In 2022, Denmark announced up to €5 billion in subsidies for CCS, aiming to reduce emissions by 0.9Mt of CO_{2} by 2030.

In the UK the CCUS roadmap outlines joint government and industry commitments to the deployment of CCUS and sets out an approach to delivering four CCUS low carbon industrial clusters, capturing 20–30 MtCO_{2} per year by 2030. In September 2024 the UK government announced £21.7bn of subsidy over 25 years for the HyNet CCS and blue hydrogen scheme in Merseyside and the East Coast Cluster scheme in Teesside.

=== Asia ===
The Chinese State Council has now issued more than 10 national policies and guidelines promoting CCS, including the Outline of the 14th Five-Year Plan (2021–2025) for National Economic and Social Development and Vision 2035 of China.

Japan regulates CCS through the CCS Business Act, managed by METI, which establishes licensing, safety standards, and post-closure liability. Due to limited domestic storage capacity, Japan relies on cross-border transport to ship captured carbon dioxide to overseas reservoirs. Additionally, the government supports early-stage commercialization through the Green Transformation (GX) strategy, utilizing public-private financial mechanisms to incentivize industrial investment.

Indonesia has established a comprehensive national framework for CCS) and CCUS through Presidential Regulation No. 14/2024 and supporting regulations by the Ministry of Energy and Mineral Resources (MEMR). These regulations govern carbon storage permits, operational guidelines, and monitoring obligations within upstream oil and gas business activities. While Indonesia possesses massive deep saline aquifer and depleted reservoir storage capacity, its regulatory framework specifies that cross-border carbon imports are primarily structured to encourage foreign emitters to invest directly in local projects.

== Related concepts ==
=== CO_{2} use in products ===
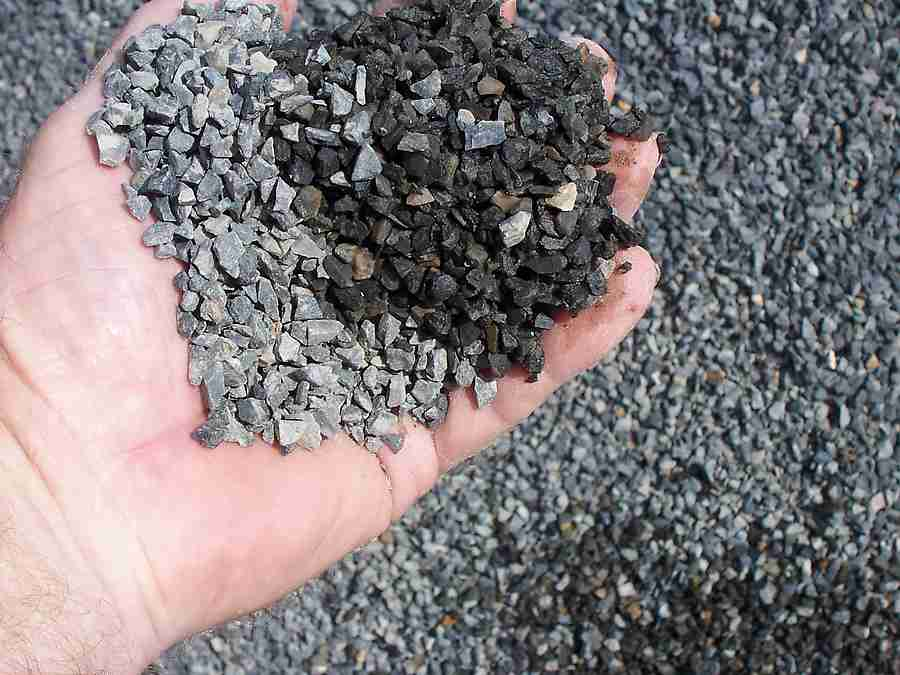
Incorporating carbon dioxide into building aggregate would sequester it indefinitely.

CO_{2} can be used as a feedstock for making various types of products. As of 2022, usage in products consumes around 1% of the CO_{2} captured each year. In the production of urea, an important agricultural fertilizer, CO_{2} generated within an industrial process is often recycled and reused. However, by convention, this type of internal recycling is not included in figures on carbon capture. Similarly, CO_{2} produced for the food and beverage industry is also excluded from these figures.

As of 2023, it is commercially feasible to produce the following products from captured CO_{2:} methanol, urea, polycarbonates, polyols, polyurethane, and salicylic acids. Methanol is currently primarily used to produce other chemicals, with potential for more widespread future use as a fuel.

Technologies for sequestering CO_{2} in mineral carbonate products have been demonstrated, but are not ready for commercial deployment as of 2023. Research is ongoing into processes to incorporate CO_{2} into concrete or building aggregate. The use of CO_{2} in construction materials holds promise for deployment at large scale, and is the only foreseeable CO_{2} use that is permanent enough to qualify as storage. Other potential uses for captured CO_{2} that are being researched include the creation of synthetic fuels, and various chemicals and plastics. The production of fuels and chemicals from CO_{2} is highly energy-intensive.

Capturing CO_{2} for use in products does not necessarily reduce emissions. The climate benefits associated with CO_{2} use primarily arise from displacing products that have higher life-cycle emissions. The amount of climate benefit varies depending on how long the product lasts before it re-releases the CO_{2}, the amount and source of energy used in production, whether the product would otherwise be produced using fossil fuels, and the source of the captured CO_{2}. Higher emissions reductions are achieved if CO_{2} is captured from bioenergy as opposed to fossil fuels.

The potential for CO_{2} use in products is small compared to the total volume of CO_{2} that could foreseeably be captured. For instance, in the IEA scenario for achieving net zero emissions by 2050, over 95% of captured CO_{2} is geologically sequestered and less than 5% is used in products.

According to the IEA, products created from captured CO_{2} are likely to cost a lot more than conventional and alternative low-carbon products. One important use of captured CO_{2} would be to produce synthetic hydrocarbon fuels, which alongside biofuels are the only practical alternative to fossil fuels for long-haul flights. Limitations on the availability of sustainable biomass mean that these synthetic fuels will be needed for net-zero emissions; the CO_{2} would need to come from bioenergy production or direct air capture to be carbon-neutral.

=== Direct air carbon capture and sequestration ===
Direct air carbon capture and sequestration (DACCS) is the use of chemical or physical processes to extract CO_{2} directly from the ambient air and putting the captured CO_{2} into long-term storage. In contrast to CCS, which captures emissions from a point source, DAC has the potential to remove carbon dioxide that is already in the atmosphere. Thus, DAC can be used to capture emissions that originated in non-stationary sources such as airplane engines. As of 2023, DACCS has yet to be integrated into emissions trading because, at over US$1000, the cost per ton of carbon dioxide is many times the carbon price on those markets.

== See also ==
- List of carbon capture and storage projects
- Timeline of carbon capture and storage
- Coal pollution mitigation
- Carbon sink
- Carbon storage in the North Sea
- Greenwashing
- Life-cycle greenhouse gas emissions of energy sources
- Methane pyrolysis
- Alberta Carbon Trunk Line
