= Sleipnir (disambiguation) =

Sleipnir is an eight-legged horse in Norse mythology.

Sleipnir or Sleipner may also refer to:

== Places ==
- Sleipner Glacier, Greenland
- Sleipnir Glacier, Antarctica

== Ships and offshore ==
- Sleipner gas field
  - Sleipner A, an offshore platform
- HNoMS Sleipner, several warships of the Royal Norwegian Navy
- Sleipner-class destroyer, a class of Norwegian destroyers
- Sleipner-class corvette, a class of corvettes
- MS Sleipner, a passenger catamaran
- SSCV Sleipnir, a large crane vessel owned and operated by Heerema

== Sports ==
- IK Sleipner, a Swedish sports club
- SK Sleipner, a Norwegian sports club; see Kampforbundet for Rød Sportsenhet

== Other uses ==
- Sleipnir (web browser)
- Sleipnir, a type of horse enemy in Final Fantasy XII
- Uddeholm Sleipner, a tool steel grade; see Uddeholms AB § Reference to international tool steel standards
- Sleipnir, a ride at Drayton Manor Resort
