= Timeline of carbon capture and storage =

Global capture capacity has trended higher since 2017.

The number of patents covering CCS technologies surged in the 2000s, but declined in the 2010s.

The milestones for carbon capture and storage show the lack of commercial scale development and implementation of CCS over the years since the first carbon tax was imposed.

The time line of carbon capture and storage announcements and developments follows: 1972: Since 1972 over 175 million metric tons of carbon dioxide (CO_{2}) have been injected into the SACROC oil field to enhance oil recovery (EOR).

== 2025 ==
According to the Global CCS Institute, in 2025, 77 commercial CCS projects were operational worldwide, with a further 47 under construction. A key milestone was the start of operations at Northern Lights, a Norwegian CCS project which trasports captured CO₂ by ship to a terminal in western Norway for temporary storage, before pipeline injection into a permanent reservoir 2,600 metres beneath the seabed.

== 2023 ==
In this year two projects among others were reported on by the ICSC in their webinar:

1. Northern Lights JV
2. PORTHOS

== 2009 ==
=== Global Carbon Capture and Storage Institute ===
10 July 2009 major economies forum meeting on climate change: Australian Prime minister Mr Rudd, who shared the stage with US President Barack Obama, said the Global Carbon Capture and Storage Institute (CCS) would now be an international initiative led by Australia - which will act as a clearing house for research of new technologies, legislation to pave their path and as a vehicle to streamline funding. "The practical challenge we face...is what do we do about the problem, the challenge, of coal. There are practically no large carbon capture and storage projects under construction now," Mr Rudd said. "Australia in the last 12 months has decided to work with other major economies, and all the major energy companies, on the establishment of a Global Carbon Capture and Storage Institute. That is what we are here launching today." He said carbon capture and storage, which captures CO_{2} and seeks to inject it in safe stores deep underground, is an important potential future weapon in the battle against global warming.

Electricity sourced from fossil fuels accounts for more than 40 per cent of the world's energy-related CO_{2} emissions. A further 25 per cent comes from large-scale industrial processes such as iron and steel production, cement making, natural gas processing and petroleum refining.

With world energy demand projected to grow by more than 40 per cent over the next two decades, reducing CO_{2} emissions is a significant challenge the nation of Australia has a particular interest in helping to solve. Australia's is the world's biggest coal exporter, and the Australian economy is heavily dependent upon coal—its biggest export. Renewable energy technology continues to develop, but fossil fuels, in particular coal and gas, will continue to provide the bulk of the world's energy for the foreseeable future.

However, there is a way to harness fossil fuels while significantly reducing CO_{2} emissions. The answer lies in the capture and storage of carbon dioxide and other climate influencing greenhouse gases.

=== GreenGen Project led by China Huaneng Group (CHNG) will begin construction in early 2009 ===
GreenGen Project aims to research, develop and demonstrate a coal-based power generation system with hydrogen production through coal gasification, power generation from a combined cycle gas turbine and fuel cells, and efficient treatment of pollutants and CO_{2}. Thus, the efficiency of the coal-based power generation will be greatly improved, and the pollutants and CO_{2} emissions will be near zero.

== 2008 ==
=== Reality campaign launched ===
3 December 2008: This Is Reality.org, a coalition of US environmental organisations, launches a campaign to highlight that no fossil fuel power station in the USA captures other than token amounts of the greenhouse gas that the Intergovernmental Panel on Climate Change (IPCC) and all other significant scientific organisations acknowledge are causing climate change, global warming, Arctic shrinkage and sea level rise.

=== CCS inclusion in CDM postponed ===
Plans to allow organizations to earn credits for CCS under the Clean Development Mechanism (CDM) have been dropped at the climate change talks in Poznan － the 14th session of the United Nations Framework Convention on Climate Change (UNFCCC). The proposal, led by Australia, was supported by a majority of representatives and the IEA but Brazil and a few other countries blocked the move. The decision will then be postponed until next year.

=== Carbon assessment software developed ===
Researchers at Massachusetts Institute of Technology (MIT) designed a new software that will help developers of clean coal technology to accurately measure how much CO_{2} they can store underground.

=== BP and CAS established the Clean Energy Commercialization Center ===
BP and the Chinese Academy of Sciences (CAS) have agreed to establish the Clean Energy Commercialization Center (CECC), a joint venture in Shanghai investing some $73 million to commercialize Chinese clean energy technologies. Subject to final government approvals, the CECC venture is expected to be established by early 2009. The CECC will serve as an international platform for further collaboration among research institutes, enterprises and other institutions to improve indigenous Chinese innovation capabilities and market applications in areas such as clean coal conversion, zero emission technologies, and carbon capture and storage.

=== UK Energy Bill received Royal Assent ===
On 26 November 2008, The UK Energy Bill received Royal Assent and was passed into law. The bill mentions to create a regulatory framework to enable private sector investment in Carbon capture and storage projects. As it has the potential to reduce the carbon emissions from fossil fuel power stations by up to 90%.

=== The Global Carbon Capture and Storage Institute planned ===
The Australian government in September committed A$100 million annually to help establish an international institute to accelerate development of clean-coal technologies, including the long-term aim of storing carbon dioxide permanently underground. Following a two-day preparatory meeting in London, the institute now has eight foundation industry members: Shell International Petroleum; Rio Tinto Ltd.; Mitsubishi Corp.; Anglo American; Xstrata Coal; Services Petroliers Schlumberger; Alstom; and The Climate Group.

=== Clean-coal debut in Germany ===
The world's first coal-fired power plant designed to capture and store carbon dioxide that it produces began operations in Spremberg, Germany. Built alongside the 1,600MW Schwarze Pumpe power plant in north Germany, the demonstration experiment will capture up to 100,000 tonnes of CO_{2} a year, compress it and bury it 3,000m below the surface of the depleted Altmark gas field, about 200 km from the site. "It's a very important and tangible step forward," said Stuart Haszeldine, a geologist and CCS expert at the University of Edinburgh. "It is the first full-chain demonstration of oxyfuel as a carbon capture technology. It connects all that for the first time in a working system."

=== Irish Energy Group launches carbon capture scheme ===
Providence Resources, an Irish oil and gas group, is launching a project that could lead to the first carbon capture & storage (CCS) scheme in the British Isles. Providence Resources is working with Star Energy Group, a UK gas storage company owned by Petronas of Malaysia, on the Ulysses Project. The scheme will evaluate the Kish Bank Basin in the Irish Sea to decide whether its underground saline reservoirs can be used for carbon sequestration and natural gas storage.

=== New organic liquids to Capture CO_{2} ===
Carbon dioxide-binding organic liquids (CO_{2}BOLs) can hold more than twice as much CO_{2} as current capture agents. The liquids could be used in coal power plants to capture the greenhouse gas from combustion exhaust.

=== The CSIRO and its Chinese partners launched a PCC pilot plant in Beijing ===
The CSIRO (Australia's Commonwealth Scientific and Industrial Research Organisation) and its Chinese partners Huaneng Group and the Thermal Power Research Institute (TPRI) have officially launched a post-combustion capture (PCC) pilot plant in Beijing that strips carbon dioxide from power station flue gases in an effort to stem climate change. The project represents another first for the CSIRO PCC program - the first capture of carbon dioxide in China using a PCC pilot plant. It begins the process of applying the technology to Chinese conditions and evaluating its effectiveness.

=== The US government called for proposals to elicit commercial involvement in FutureGen project ===
In June 2008, the US government announced a call for proposals to elicit commercial involvement in the restructuring of FutureGen.

=== The U.S. Department of Energy announced to restructure FutureGen ===
The United States Department of Energy announced a restructuring of the FutureGen project, which was claimed necessary due to rising costs.

=== Carbon Capture Journal published the first issue of its print magazine ===
Carbon Capture Journal is the world's first and only news service, leading to a print magazine, specifically about developments with carbon capture and geological storage technology. The print magazine is published six times a year (bimonthly). It informs people of developments around the world in both power station carbon capture and geological storage, with news about the major projects and developments with government policy. It is produced by the team behind Digital Energy Journal, one of the world's leading magazines and news services for information technology in the oil and gas industry. Digital Energy Journal Ltd, based in central London, was founded in December 2005 by the successful team behind Digital Ship magazine.

=== Researches and debates on Carbon Capture Ready (CCR) become active ===
Researches and debates on capture ready become active in 2008, evidences of which consist of IChemEng (Institute of Chemical Engineering) Capture Ready Report, IEA Carbon Capture Ready Report, and CAPPCCO project. The Chinese Advanced Power Plant Carbon Capture Options (CAPPCCO) project is based on a five-year program at Imperial College London, its objective is to research how to make new power plants in China ‘capture ready’.

== 2007 ==
=== Australia and China signed a partnership agreement ===
On September 6, 2007, Australia and China signed a partnership agreement that will pave the way for the installation of low-emission coal energy technology in Beijing in 2008. Signed by CSIRO Chief Executive, Dr Geoff Garrett, and Mr Li Xiaopeng, the President of China's state-owned energy enterprise, the China Huaneng Group, the agreement will see a post combustion capture pilot plant installed at the Huaneng Beijing Co-generation Power Plant.

=== The North American Carbon Capture & Storage Association (NACCSA) ===
Founded in September 2007, the non-profit association supports the development of a commercial CCS industry in the United States and Canada. It is the first of its kind organization in North America to advocate for policies that support the development of a commercial CCS industry. Founding member companies include: BlueSource, Halliburton, International Paper, Keener Oil & Gas Company, Kinder Morgan, MissionPoint Capital Partners, Occidental Petroleum Corporation, Peabody Energy, PetroSource Energy Company, Ramgen Power Systems, Schlumberger, and Shell.

=== BP and Chinese Academy of Sciences signed the MoU to establish the Clean Energy Commercialization Centre ===
BP and Chinese Academy of Sciences held a ceremony in Shanghai to celebrate the signing of a Memorandum of Understanding, announcing their intent to establish the Clean Energy Commercialization Centre. CECC aims to accelerate the development in China of clean coal conversion technologies and the creation of associated value chain investment opportunities through the commercialization of key technologies and coordinated management of large scale demonstration projects which primarily use coal as feedstock for fuel production, chemicals manufacturing and power generation.

=== Website of Carbon Capture Journal launched ===
Carbon Capture Journal focuses on industrial carbon capture from power stations and industrial plants and carbon dioxide underground storage, including new technology, policy and projects. Since launching the website in May 2007, it has been actively sought out by the carbon capture world's most influential figures, from power companies, oil and gas companies, government, financiers /banks, researchers, consultants, academics, NGOs, lawyers, engineering companies and technology suppliers.

== 2006 ==
=== Coach Project - cooperation action within CCS China-EU ===
The launch meeting for the new European Coach project was held in Beijing on November 21 and 22, 2006. An integral part of the European Commission's FP6, this project falls within the scope of the partnership agreement signed at the start of 2006 between the European Union and China focusing on ways of tackling climate change. The aim of Coach is to provide the technical recommendations required to design a coal-fired power station incorporating CO_{2} capture and storage technologies, to be constructed in China by 2010. The power station is expected to be industrially operational by 2015. Mature hydrocarbon fields located in Beijing have been identified as potential storage sites.

=== UK Government faces tough choices on future power ===
Public consultation on Britain's future energy needs ends with divided camps leaving the government with tough choices on power supplies. Bound by pledges to slash greenhouse gas emissions, the UK government must decide the shape of the country's electricity supply network for coming decades as demand booms and North Sea oil and gas run out. On one side of the debate is the so-called "big power" lobby promoting coal and nuclear generation. On the other, the green alternative advocating a wider mix of power sources including those coming from individuals' own efforts.

== 2005 ==
=== Carbon Capture and Storage Association (CCSA) established ===
Established in October 2005, CCSA encourages the development of carbon capture and storage (CCS) in UK, and plays an important role in delivering CCS technologies and projects worldwide. 11 founding companies consist of BP, Mitsui Babcock, Schlumberger, Scottish & Southern Energy, Shell, etc.

=== NZEC agreement (Near Zero Emissions Coal Project) ===
The EU-China NZEC agreement was signed at the EU-China Summit under the UK's presidency of the EU in September 2005 as part of the EU-China Partnership on Climate Change. The agreement has the objective of demonstrating advanced, near zero emissions coal technology through CCS in China and the EU by 2020. The Sino-UK bilateral NZEC initiative was developed in support of this wider agreement. The joint Sino-UK Near Zero Emissions Coal initiative is sponsored by UK's Department for the Environment, Food and Rural Affairs (Defra), together with the Department for Business, Enterprise and Regulatory Reform (BERR), and the Ministry of Science and Technology (MOST) of the People's Republic of China.

=== The Scottish Centre for Carbon Storage established ===
The Scottish Centre for Carbon Storage was set up in September 2005. This collaboration between the University of Edinburgh and Heriot-Watt University as well as the British Geological Survey, builds on and extends established expertise. The Centre comprises experimental and analytical facilities, expertise in field studies and modelling, and key academic and research personnel to stimulate the development of innovative solutions to carbon capture and geological storage.

=== The new Norwegian government aims to make Norway the forerunner in CCS ===
The new Norwegian government that came into power in the autumn of 2005 aims to make Norway the forerunner in CO_{2} capture and storage. It has also made a commitment to ensure that gas-fired power plants will be equipped with CO_{2} capture technology, and has allocated a total of €19 million to related R&D to be distributed through a new organization called Gassnova. The country has also intensified its international collaboration in the field, e.g., with the UK.

=== The UK Carbon Capture and Storage Consortium (UKCCSC) started ===
UKCCSC is a consortium of engineering, technological, natural, environmental, social and economic scientists, as a way to expand UK research capacity in carbon capture and storage. Its CCS objectives consist of: • Assess impact of future energy supply/demand scenarios on overall costs/emissions of non-CCS and CCS fossil generation • Explore role of CCS in the update of the UK's energy infrastructure • Investigate potential impacts of CO_{2} leakage during capture and storage, and compare these to environmental impacts of non-intervention

=== EU Emission Trading Scheme commenced operation ===
The European Union Greenhouse Gas Emission Trading Scheme (EU ETS) commenced operation in January 2005 as the largest multi-country, multi-sector Greenhouse Gas emission trading scheme worldwide.

=== CCS technology was integrated into Chinese national development plan ===
In 2005, the CCS technology was integrated into Chinese National Medium- and Long-term Science and Technology Development Plan towards 2020(2006–2020)

== 2004 ==
=== CO_{2} Capture Project Phase II（CCP2）：2004－2008 ===
The targets of Phase II consist of:

- Achieve significant progress for each technology:
  - Scaling-up successfully operation by at least one order of magnitude.
  - Addressing and solving critical issues identified in Phase I
- Confirm or improve economical evaluations of Phase I.
- At least one technology ready for field demonstration

== 2003 ==
=== The U.S. Department of Energy named the seven regional partnerships on CCS ===
The U.S. Department of Energy on August 18, 2003, named the seven partnerships of state agencies, universities, and private companies that will form the core of a nationwide network to help determine the best approaches for capturing and permanently storing gases that can contribute to global climate change. The Regional Sequestration Partnership Program supports region-specific studies to determine the most suitable CCS technologies, regulations, and infrastructure. The seven partnerships consist of Big Sky Regional Carbon Sequestration Partnership, Midwest Geological Sequestration Consortium (Illinois Basin), Midwest Regional Carbon Sequestration Partnership, Southeast Regional Carbon Sequestration Partnership, Southwest Regional Partnership for Carbon Sequestration, Plains CO_{2} Reduction Partnership, and West Coast Regional Carbon Sequestration Partnership.

=== Tsinghua-BP Clean Energy Research and Education Centre was launched ===
Under the "Clean Energy: Facing the Future" Programme, the Tsinghua-BP Clean Energy Research and Education Centre was launched in July 2003. It aims to combine the strengths to create a "world-leading institute for energy strategy study for China". It has attracted a broad range of important players in various aspects of energy, industry and environment to serve on the advisory board of the centre.

=== The inaugural meeting of the Carbon Sequestration Leadership Forum (CSLF) was held. ===
The inaugural meeting of CSLF was held in Tysons Corner, Virginia, USA in June 2003. Thirteen countries and the European Commission signed the CSLF charter as part of this ministerial summit. The Charter committed each country to participate in the CSLF process, and specifically to provide both policy and technical expertise through a formal working group structure. CSLF is an international climate change initiative focusing on the development of carbon capture and storage technologies as a means to accomplishing long-term stabilization of GHG levels in the atmosphere. It is designed to improve CCS technologies through coordinated research and development with international partners and private industry.

=== The US federal government announced FutureGen Project ===
On February 27, 2003, the US federal government announced FutureGen, a $1 billion initiative to create a coal-based power plant focused on demonstrating a revolutionary clean coal technology that would produce hydrogen and electricity and mitigate greenhouse gas emissions. The FutureGen project was initiated in response to the National Energy Policy of May 2001, which emphasized the need for diverse and secure energy sources that could largely be provided by America's most abundant domestic energy resource, coal.

=== U.S. Department of Energy budget for carbon capture and storage research ===
One sign of the increased seriousness with which policymakers view the potential for CCS is the budget devoted by the U.S. Department of Energy to research on CCS, which has increased from about $1 million in 1998 to a 2003 budget request of $54 million, just five years later. (1998- $1mln, 1999- $6mln, 2000- $9mln, 2001- $18mln, 2002- $32mln, 2003- $54mln)

== 2002 ==
=== IPCC decided to hold a workshop to do a literature on CCS ===
In April 2002, at its 19th Session in Geneva, the IPCC decided to hold a workshop, which took place in November 2002 in Regina, Canada. The results of this workshop were a first assessment of literature on CO_{2} capture and storage, and a proposal for a Special Report. At its 20th Session in 2003 in Paris, France, the IPCC endorsed this proposal and agreed on the outline and timetable for the special report.

== 2001 ==
=== ‘Clean Energy: Facing the Future’ Programme ===
In November 2001, BP established the "Clean Energy: Facing the Future" Programme in China with the Chinese Academy of Sciences and Tsinghua University to create a partnership within China to address the issues and opportunities of clean energy. BP is providing $10 million over a ten-year period to fund research in new clean energy technologies. This programme aims to develop and prove new clean options for China and the rest of the world. The programme includes several projects at CAS's Dalian Institute of Chemical Physics and Shenyang Institute of Metals Research.

=== The RECOPOL project started on November 1, 2001. ===
RECOPOL stands for: 'Reduction of CO_{2} emission by means of CO_{2} storage in coal seams in the Silesian Coal Basin of Poland'. It is an EU co-funded combined research and demonstration project to investigate the possibility of permanent subsurface storage of CO_{2} in coal. At a selected location in Poland a pilot installation is developed for methane gas production from coal beds while simultaneously storing CO_{2} underground. The produced methane could become an alternative fuel that can be locally produced in Silesia. This installation is the very first of its kind in Europe, and at the moment the only one operational worldwide.

=== The UNFCCC invited IPCC to prepare a special report on CCS technologies ===
The United Nations Framework Convention on Climate Change (UNFCCC) at its seventh Conference of Parties (COP7) in 2001 invited the Intergovernmental Panel on Climate Change (IPCC) to prepare a special report on carbon capture and storage technologies.

== 2000 ==
=== The Carbon Sequestration Initiative launched ===
As a major component of the Carbon Capture and Sequestration Technologies Program at MIT, the Carbon Sequestration Initiative (CSI) was launched in July 2000. CSI is an industrial consortium formed to investigate CCS technologies, it aims to:

- Provide an objective source of assessment and information about carbon sequestration.
- Establish a members' information network to provide timely updates on relevant activities and new findings.
- Explore the societal and technical aspects of carbon sequestration.
- Educate a wider audience on the possibilities of carbon sequestration.
- Link industry to expanding government activities on these topics.
- Stimulate and seed new research ideas.
- Create an annual forum for strategic thinking and identification of new business opportunities.

=== CCP Phase I: April 2000-December 2003 ===
The CO_{2} Capture Project (CCP) is a partnership of eight of the world's leading energy companies and three government organizations undertaking research and developing technologies to help make CCS a practical reality for reducing global CO_{2} emissions and tackling climate change.

April 2000-August 2000: Review & Evaluation/ over 200 ideas reviewed

August 2000-September 2001: 30 Capture and 50 Storage Techs Screened, 50 Techs Pass Stage Gate/ tech teams screen tech options and recommend detailed evaluation of promising candidates

September 2001-December 2002: Broad Tech Development

December 2002-December 2003: Focused Tech Development

=== CO_{2} injection began in Weyburn ===
Delivery of the first CO_{2} from Dakota Gasification Company to Weyburn commenced in September 2000. In late 2000, CO_{2} injection was initiated at an initial injection rate of 2.69 million m3/d (or 5000 t/d) into 19 patterns.

== Before 2000 ==
=== 1998 ===
==== EnCana announced plans to implement Weyburn EOR project ====
In 1998, a Canadian oil and gas corporation (the PanCanadian Petroleum Limited, now EnCana Corporation) announced plans to implement a large scale EOR project in an oilfield near Weyburn, Saskatchewan, Canada, using CO_{2} captured from Dakota Gasification Company. The Weyburn-Midale Carbon Dioxide Project provided a chance to demonstrate and study a large-scale geological storage project and to provide the data to evaluate the safety, technical and economic feasibility of such storage.

=== 1997 ===
==== DGC agreed to send all of the waste gas (96% CO_{2}) to the Weyburn oil field ====
The Weyburn oil field is situated in Canada, near the USA border. The carbon dioxide for the Weyburn EOR project is produced in the Great Plains Synfuels Plant in Beulah, North Dakota, USA, which is operated by the Dakota Gasification Company. In 1997, DGC agreed to send all of the waste gas (96% CO_{2}) from its Great Plains Synfuels Plant through a pipeline to the Weyburn oil field.

=== 1996 ===
==== Sleipner — a carbon dioxide storage project ====
The Sleipner gas field is in the North Sea, about 250 km west of Stavanger, Norway. It is operated by Norway's largest oil company Statoil. The Sleipner field produces natural gas and light oil from the Heimdal sandstones, which are about 2,500 m below sea level. The natural gas produced at Sleipner contains unusually high levels (about 9%) of carbon dioxide, but the customers require less than 2.5%. This means that the CO_{2} that is stored at Sleipner is a by-product of gas purification, rather than CO_{2} captured from a point source. As such, the Sleipner project is more precisely described as a carbon storage project.

To encourage companies to cut their carbon emissions, the Norwegian government imposes a carbon tax equivalent to about $50 per ton of CO_{2} released into the atmosphere. To avoid paying the tax, and as a test of alternative technology, all of the CO_{2} extracted since 1996, when gas production started at Sleipner, has been pumped back deep underground. The Sleipner project is the first commercial example of CO_{2} storage in a deep saline aquifer, so there is a lot of interest from around the world in its success. In particular, scientists want to know how the CO_{2} moves inside the aquifer and if there is a risk that it could escape back to the surface.

=== 1991 ===
==== The Norwegian government instituted a tax on CO_{2} emissions ====
In 1991, the Norwegian government instituted a tax on CO_{2} emissions, which motivated Statoil to capture the CO_{2} emitted from its Sleipner oil and gas field in the North Sea and inject it into an underground aquifer.

=== 1989 ===
==== The Carbon Capture and Sequestration Technologies Program at MIT initiated ====
Initiated in 1989, the Carbon Capture and Sequestration Technologies Program at MIT conducts research into technologies to capture, utilize, and store CO_{2} from large stationary sources. It is globally recognized as a leader in the field of carbon capture and storage research.

=== Early 1970s ===
==== The use of CO_{2} for commercial EOR began in US in the early 1970s. ====
The use of CO_{2} for commercial enhanced oil recovery started in USA in the early 1970s. There are currently about 120 registered CO_{2} floods worldwide, almost 85% of which are in the United States and Canada.
