= CO2-Plume Geothermal =

Technology combining CO2 storage and geothermal energy production

CO_{2}-Plume Geothermal (CPG) is a proposed technology that combines carbon capture and storage (CCS/CCUS) with geothermal energy extraction, utilising carbon dioxide (CO_{2}) itself as a geothermal energy extraction fluid. The technology was first proposed by Dr. Donald W. Brown at the 25th Workshop on Geothermal Reservoir Engineering at Stanford University in 2000.

== Technology ==
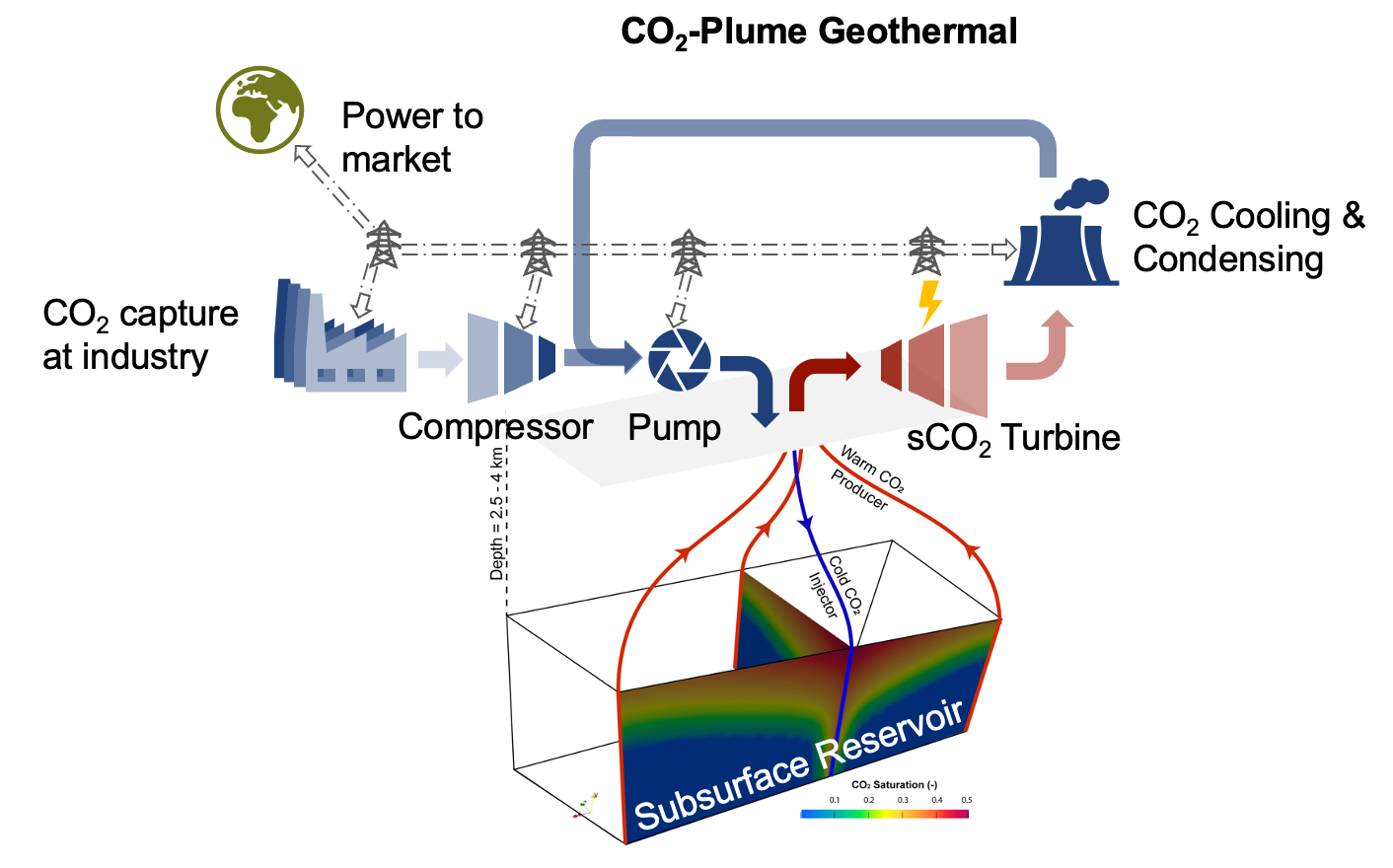
Schematic of a CO_{2}-Plume Geothermal system

First, CO_{2} would be injected in deep and naturally permeable reservoirs, as in CCS, where the CO_{2} would be heated by the surrounding rock. At a nearby location, production wells would then extract the geothermally heated supercritical CO_{2} back to the surface, where it would be expanded in a turbine to generate electricity. The CO_{2} would then be cooled and condensed back to a dense phase and re-injected into the reservoir, closing the cycle and enabling all CO_{2} to remain sequestered. CPG has the potential to generate over twice the power of conventional, water-based geothermal systems for similar conditions: while the specific heat capacity of CO_{2} is less than that of water, the significantly lower dynamic viscosity of CO_{2} would enable higher overall energy extraction rates.

== Relation to CCS projects ==
As the subsurface reservoir cools due to geothermal heat extraction, the density of CO_{2} in the subsurface increases, enabling a larger mass to be stored for a given formation. Other identified impacts of CPG on CCS include increased control over CO_{2} volumetric sweep, reduced carbon intensity of storage due to renewable energy production, additional monitoring data from production wells, flexibility to repurpose producer wells to injectors, avoiding injector downtime with associated halite deposition risks, and providing communities with power produced using CO_{2}.

== Research needs ==
While existing equipment from CO_{2} enhanced oil recovery (EOR) and CCS projects could be repurposed for CPG, additional new equipment is required, primarily lower temperature supercritical turbines and high-pressure CO_{2} cooling and condensing units. Selecting suitable locations is a challenge.
