= HNoMS Sleipner =

Three ships of the Royal Norwegian Navy have borne the name HNoMS Sleipner. The name is derived from Sleipnir - Odin's magical eight-legged steed, and the greatest of all horses:

- HNoMS Sleipner (1877) was a 1.-class gunboat launched in 1877 and scrapped in 1935.
- HNoMS Sleipner (1936) was a Sleipner-class destroyer launched in 1936 and scrapped in 1959.
- HNoMS Sleipner (1963) was a Sleipner-class corvette launched in 1963 and decommissioned in 1992 to be expended as a target ship.
