= Sleipner-class corvette =

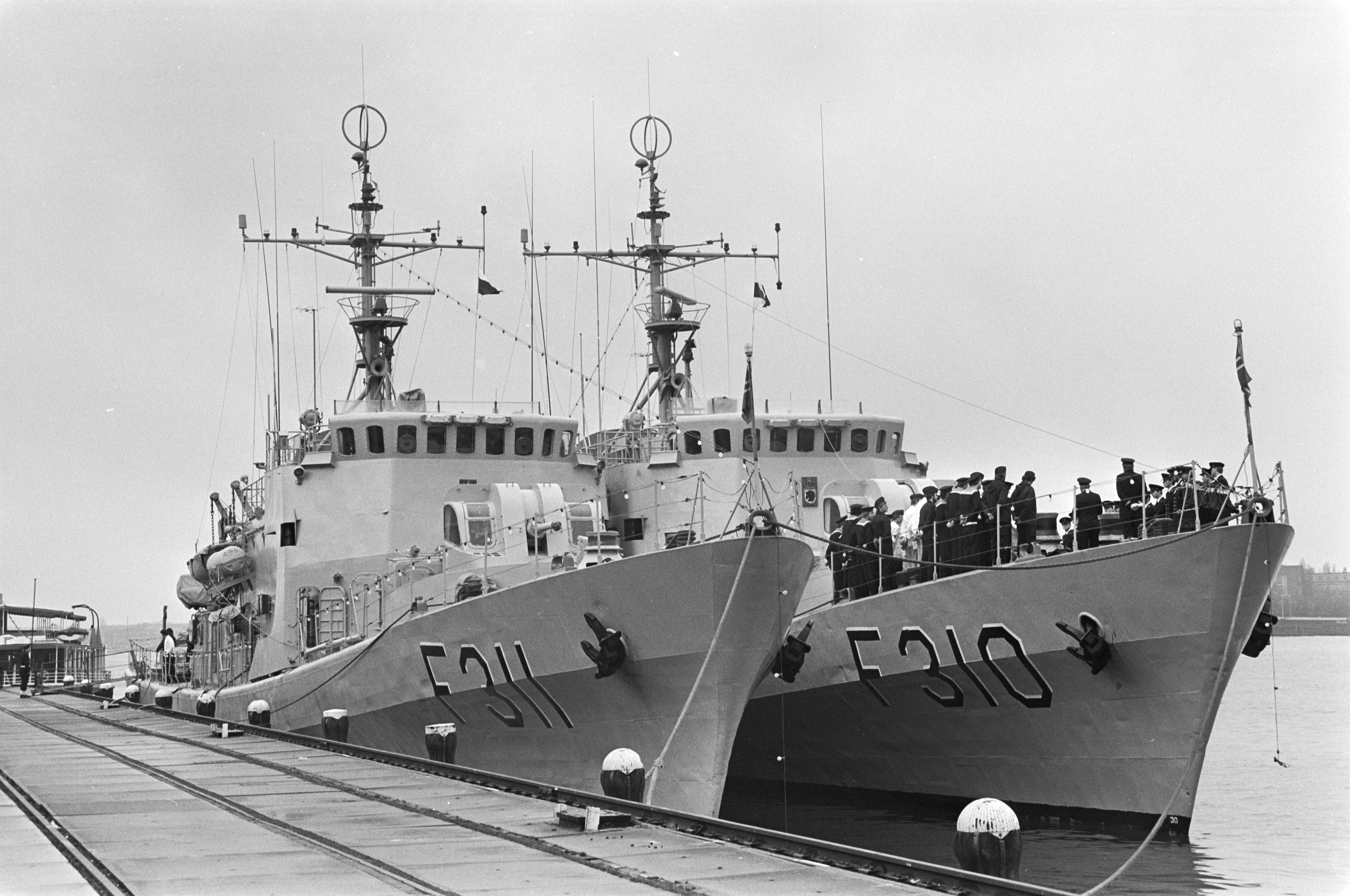
- KNM Sleipner (F310) and KNM Aeger (F311) at Amsterdam.

Class overview
- Name: Sleipner class
- Builders: Nylands Mekaniske Verksted; Aker Mekaniske Verksted
- Operators: Royal Norwegian Navy
- Built: 1963–1965
- In commission: 1965–1992
- Planned: 5
- Completed: 2
- Scrapped: 1

General characteristics
- Type: Corvette
- Displacement: 600 long tons (610 t) standard; 790 long tons (803 t) full load
- Length: 69.33 m (227 ft 6 in)
- Beam: 7.90 m (25 ft 11 in)
- Draught: 2.50 m (8 ft 2 in)
- Propulsion: 4 × MTU diesels totalling 9,000 bhp (6,711 kW)
- Speed: 20 kn (37 km/h; 23 mph)
- Complement: 61
- Sensors & processing systems: Decca TM 1226 surface search radar; Decca 202 navigation radar; Phillips TVT-300 optronic fire control systems; Thomson-CSF Spheron hull sonar
- Armament: 1 × Mark 34 76 mm (3 in) anti-aircraft gun; 1 × 40 mm Bofors anti-aircraft gun; 1 × Kongsberg Terne III MK 8 6-tube rocket-thrown depth charge launcher; 6 × Mark 32 324 mm (12.8 in) torpedo tubes in triple mountings; 1 depth charge rack (6 depth charges)

The Sleipner class was a series of corvettes ordered as part of the Royal Norwegian Navy's 1960 fleet plan. It was intended to build five ships of the class, but because of economic problems only two were built; Sleipner and Æger.

== Development ==
Sleipner was built by Nylands Mekaniske Verksted, Oslo, and Æger by Aker Mekaniske Verksted, Oslo, and handed over to the Royal Norwegian Navy between 1965 and 1967. The ships were armed with an American 3 in (76.2 mm) gun forward and a Bofors 40 mm gun aft, with a Terne III anti-submarine rocket launcher ahead of the 40 mm gun. The ships were fitted with American SQS-36 sonar.

The ships had their anti-submarine capabilities improved in 1972, when they were fitted with Mark 32 anti-submarine torpedo tubes. The ships were mainly used as training ships in the 1980s, although they did retain a wartime role as coastal escorts. They were again modernised between 1988 and 1989, with new sonar and gun fire control systems fitted. They were decommissioned in 1993.

== Ship list ==
Sleipner class
#	Name	Laid down	Launched	Commissioned	Decommissioned
F 310 (originally P 950)	Sleipner	1963	9 November 1963	29 April 1965	1993
F 311 (originally P 951)	Æger	1964	24 September 1965	31 March 1967	1993

== See also ==
- List of Royal Norwegian Navy ships
