= List of canceled nuclear reactors in the United States =

The late 1960s and early 1970s saw a rapid growth in the development of nuclear power in the United States. By 1976, however, many nuclear plant proposals were no longer viable due to a slower rate of growth in electricity demand, significant cost and time overruns, and more complex regulatory requirements. Also, there was considerable public opposition to nuclear power in the US by this time, which contributed to delays in licensing planned nuclear power stations, and further increased costs.

By the end of the 1970s, it was clear that nuclear power would not grow nearly as dramatically as once believed. This was particularly due to the Three Mile Island accident in 1979. Eventually, more than 120 reactor orders were cancelled and the construction of new reactors ground to a halt. Al Gore commented on the historical record and reliability of nuclear power in the United States:

Of the 253 nuclear power reactors originally ordered in the United States from 1953 to 2008, 48 percent were cancelled, 11 percent were prematurely shut down, 14 percent experienced at least a one-year-or-more outage, and 27 percent are operating without having a year-plus outage. Thus, only about one fourth of those ordered, or about half of those completed, are still operating and have proved relatively reliable.

A cover story in the February 11, 1985, issue of Forbes commented on the overall management of the nuclear power program in the United States:

The failure of the U.S. nuclear power program ranks as the largest managerial disaster in business history, a disaster on a monumental scale ... only the blind, or the biased, can now think that the money has been well spent. It is a defeat for the U.S. consumer and for the competitiveness of U.S. industry, for the utilities that undertook the program and for the private enterprise system that made it possible.

During the 2000s, aging infrastructure, growing power use and fears of global climate change all prompted what was then called the "nuclear renaissance". Engineering companies noted that the commissioning process was a major barrier to further construction, and the US Nuclear Regulatory Commission made changes to the system as part of the Energy Policy Act of 2005, along with new tax incentives and loan guarantees. As many as 30 new reactors were planned by 2009.

As of February 2021, only two new reactors were still under construction, both at Vogtle. The project has announced significant delays and budget overruns. These two reactors started power generation in 2023 and 2024.

By July 2026, several test reactors achieved zero-power criticality as part of the Department of Energy's Reactor Pilot Program. As of August 2026, several new reactors are under construction, including the Hermes 2 plant in Oak Ridge, Tennessee, the Kemmerer Power Station in Wyoming, and Aurora-INL in Idaho.

== Cancelled nuclear reactors ==
Name (Note: Cancelled reactors Midland 1 Midland 2 Hope Creek 2 Zimmer 1 Norco 1 Shearon Harris 2 Shearon Harris 3 Shearon Harris 4 North Anna 3 North Anna 4 Surry 3 Surry 4 Floating 1 Bellefonte 1 Bellefonte 2 Perry 2 Seabrook 2 Douglas Point 1 Douglas Point 2 Greenwood 2 Greenwood 3 River Bend 2 WPPSS 1 (Hanford) Clinton 2 Fulton 1 Fulton 2 Allens Creek 1 Allens Creek 2 Pilgrim 2 Atlantic 1 Atlantic 2 Tyrone 1 Sterling 1 Callaway 2 Perkins 1 Perkins 2 Perkins 3 Cherokee 1 Cherokee 2 Cherokee 3 Montague 1 Montague 2 Davis Besse 2 Davis Besse 3 Heaven 1 Heaven 2 WPPSS 3 (Satsop) WPPSS 5 (Satsop) Blue Hills 1 Blue Hills 2 WPPSS 4 (Hanford) Pebble Springs 1 Pebble Springs 2 James Port 1 James Port 2 Hartsville A1 Hartsville A2 Hartsville B1 Hartsville B2 Skagit 1 Skagit 2 Barton 1 Barton 2 Barton 3 Barton 4 Clinch River Marbel Hill 1 Marbel Hill 2 Fort Calhoun 2 Greene County Phipps Bend 1 Phipps Bend 2 Black Fox 1 Black Fox 2 Yellow Creek 1 Yellow Creek 2 Nep 1 Nep 2 Erie 1 Erie 2)	Unit	Type	Model*	Status	Location	State	Net capacity in MW	Gross capacity in MW	Contract year	Construction start	Project close	Refs
Alabama Power Co	1	BWR	GE	Cancelled plan	Selma	Alabama			-	-	-	
Alabama Power Co	2	BWR	GE	Cancelled plan	Selma	Alabama			-	-	-	
Allens Creek	1	BWR	GE	Cancelled plan	Wallis	Texas	1,160	1,207	1973	-	1982-09-01	
Allens Creek	2	BWR	GE	Cancelled plan	Wallis	Texas	1,160	1,207	1973	-	1976-09-01	
Atlantic (offshore)	1	PWR		Cancelled plan	Atlantic City	New Jersey	1,150	1,211	1972	-	1978-12-01	
Atlantic (offshore)	2	PWR		Cancelled plan	Atlantic City	New Jersey	1,150	1,211	1972	-	1978-12-01	
Atlantic (offshore)	3	PWR		Cancelled plan	Atlantic City	New Jersey	1,150	1,211	1973	-	1978-12-01	
Atlantic (offshore)	4	PWR		Cancelled plan	Atlantic City	New Jersey	1,150	1,211	1973	-	1978-12-01	
Bailly (converted to coal)	1	BWR	GE	Cancelled construction	Westchester Township, Porter County	Indiana	660	686	1967	1974-01-01	1981-08-01	
Barton	1	BWR	GE BWR-6	Cancelled plan	Clanton	Alabama	1,209	1,254	1972	-	1977-11-01	
Barton	2	BWR	GE BWR-6	Cancelled plan	Clanton	Alabama	1,209	1,254	1972	-	1977-11-01	
Barton	3	BWR	GE BWR-6	Cancelled plan	Clanton	Alabama	1,209	1,254	1974	-	1975-11-01	
Barton	4	BWR	GE BWR-6	Cancelled plan	Clanton	Alabama	1,209	1,254	1974	-	1975-11-01	
Bell Bend	1	PWR	Areva EPR	Cancelled plan	Salem	Pennsylvania	1,600	1,720	-	-	-	
Bell Station	1			Cancelled plan	Lansing	New York	838		1967	-	1972	
Bellefonte	1	PWR	B&W Model 205	Suspended construction	Scottsboro	Alabama	1,235	1,263	1970	1974-09-01	1988-01-01	
Bellefonte	2	PWR	B&W Model 205	Suspended construction	Scottsboro	Alabama	1,235	1,263	1970	1974-09-01	1988-01-01	
Bellefonte	3	PWR	WH AP1000	Cancelled plan	Scottsboro	Alabama	1117		-	-	-	
Bellefonte	4	PWR	WH AP1000	Cancelled plan	Scottsboro	Alabama	1117		-	-	-	
Black Fox	1	BWR	GE	Cancelled construction	Inola	Oklahoma	1,150	1,226	1973	1978-07-01	1982-02-01	
Black Fox	2	BWR	GE	Cancelled construction	Inola	Oklahoma	1,150	1,226	1973	1978-07-01	1982-02-01	
Blue Hills (formerly Sunken Log)	1	PWR		Cancelled plan	Jasper	Texas	930	957	1973	-	1978-08-01	
Blue Hills (formerly Sunken Log)	2	PWR		Cancelled plan	Jasper	Texas	930	957	1974	-	1978-08-01	
Bodega Bay	1	BWR	GE	Cancelled construction	Bodega Head	California	313	589	-	1958	1964	
Callaway	2	PWR		Cancelled construction	Callaway	Missouri	1,120	1,176	1973	1975-10-01	1981-10-01	
Callaway	2	PWR	Areva EPR	Cancelled plan	Callaway	Missouri	1,600		2008	-	2015-8	
Calvert Cliffs	3	PWR	Areva EPR	Cancelled plan	Calvert County	Maryland	1,600	1,720	-	-	2015-06-08	
Carroll County	1	PWR		Cancelled plan	Savanna	Illinois	1,120	1,150	1978	-	1988-12-01	
Carroll County	2	PWR		Cancelled plan	Savanna	Illinois	1,120	1,150	1978	-	1988-12-01	
Central Iowa	1	BWR	GE	Cancelled plan		Iowa	1,100	1,160	-	-	1975-09-01	
Cherokee	1	PWR		Cancelled construction	Gaffney	South Carolina	1,280	1,343	1973	1976-06-01	1983-04-01	
Cherokee	2	PWR		Cancelled construction	Gaffney	South Carolina	1,280	1,343	1973	1976-06-01	1982-11-01	
Cherokee	3	PWR		Cancelled construction	Gaffney	South Carolina	1,280	1,343	1973	1976-06-01	1982-11-01	
Clinch River Breeder Reactor	1	FBR	AEC	Cancelled plan	Oak Ridge	Tennessee	350	380	1973	-	1983-11-01	
Clinton	2	BWR	GE BWR-6	Cancelled construction	Clinton	Illinois	933	985	1973	1975-10-01	1983-10-01	
Columbia (WNP-1/WPPSS-1)	1	PWR		Cancelled construction	Richland	Washington	1,259	1,339	1972	1975-08-01	1983-01-01	
Columbia (WNP-4/WPPSS-4)	4	PWR		Cancelled construction	Richland	Washington	1,250	1,340	1974	1975-08-01	1982-01-01	
Comanche Peak	3	PWR	MHI US-APWR	Suspended plan	Somervell County	Texas	1,700		-	-	2013-11-07	
Comanche Peak	4	PWR	MHI US-APWR	Suspended plan	Somervell County	Texas	1,700		-	-	2013-11-07	
Crystal River	4	PWR		Cancelled plan	Crystal River	Florida	897	940	1971	-	1972-07-01	
Davis Besse	2	PWR		Cancelled plan	Oak Harbor	Ohio	910	960	1973	-	1980-01-01	
Davis Besse	3	PWR		Cancelled plan	Oak Harbor	Ohio	910	960	1973	-	1980-01-01	
Douglas Point (US)	1	BWR	GE	Cancelled plan	Charles County	Maryland	1,178	1,206	1972	-	1980-05-01	
Douglas Point (US)	2	BWR	GE	Cancelled plan	Charles County	Maryland	1,178	1,206	1972	-	1978-01-01	
Erie	1	PWR		Cancelled plan	Berlin Heights	Ohio	1,260	1,300	1976	-	1980-01-01	
Erie	2	PWR		Cancelled plan	Berlin Heights	Ohio	1,260	1,300	1976	-	1980-01-01	
Floating	1	PWR		Cancelled plan	Jacksonville	Florida	1,150	1,211	-	-	1979-01-01	
Floating	2	PWR		Cancelled plan	Jacksonville	Florida	1,150	1,211	-	-	1979-01-01	
Forked River	1	PWR		Cancelled construction	Forked River	New Jersey	1,070	1,123	1969	1973-08-01	1980-11-01	
Fort Calhoun	2	PWR		Cancelled plan	Fort Calhoun	Nebraska	1,136	1,182	1972	-	1977-02-01	
Fulton	1	HTGR	GA	Cancelled plan	Lancaster	Pennsylvania	1,160	1,200	1971	-	1976-03-01	
Fulton	2	HTGR	GA	Cancelled plan	Lancaster	Pennsylvania	1,160	1,200	1971	-	1976-03-01	
Galena	1	SFR	Toshiba 4S	Proposal cancelled	Galena	Alaska	10		2008	-	-	
Grand Gulf	2	BWR	GE BWR-6	Cancelled construction	Port Gibson	Mississippi	1,250	1,302	1972	1974-05-01	1990-12-01	
Grand Gulf	3	BWR	GE ESBWR	Cancelled plan	Port Gibson	Mississippi	1,520	1,600	1973	-	2015-02-09	
Greene County	1	PWR		Cancelled plan	Clementon	New Jersey	1,191	1,277	1974	-	1979-04-01	
Greenwood	2	PWR		Cancelled plan	Port Huron	Michigan	1,208	1,268	1972	-	1980-03-01	
Greenwood	3	PWR		Cancelled plan	Port Huron	Michigan	1,208	1,268	1972	-	1980-03-01	
Hartsville	A1	BWR	GE	Cancelled construction	Hartsville	Tennessee	1,233	1,269	1972	1976-04-01	1984-08-01	
Hartsville	A2	BWR	GE	Cancelled construction	Hartsville	Tennessee	1,233	1,269	1972	1976-04-01	1984-08-01	
Hartsville	B1	BWR	GE	Cancelled construction	Hartsville	Tennessee	1,233	1,269	1972	1976-04-01	1982-08-01	
Hartsville	B2	BWR	GE	Cancelled construction	Hartsville	Tennessee	1,233	1,269	1972	1976-04-01	1982-08-01	
Haven	1	PWR	WH 3-Loop	Cancelled plan	Haven	Wisconsin	900	960	1973	-	1980-02-01	
Haven	2	PWR	WH 3-Loop	Cancelled plan	Haven	Wisconsin	900	960	1974	-	1978-05-01	
Hope Creek	2	BWR	GE	Cancelled construction	Hancocks Bridge	New Jersey	1,067	1,118	1969	1976-03-01	1981-12-01	
Jamesport	1	PWR		Cancelled plan	Northville	New York	1,150	1,182	1973	-	1980-01-01	
Jamesport	2	PWR		Cancelled plan	Northville	New York	1,150	1,182	1974	-	1980-01-01	
Koshkonong	1	PWR		Cancelled plan	Jefferson County	Wisconsin	900	900	1973	-	1977-01-10	
Koshkonong	2	PWR		Cancelled plan	Jefferson County	Wisconsin	900	900	1973	-	1977-01-10	
Levy County	1	PWR	WH AP1000	Cancelled plan	Levy County	Florida	1,117		2008	-	2013-08-01	
Levy County	2	PWR	WH AP1000	Cancelled plan	Levy County	Florida	1,117		2008	-	2013-08-01	
Malibu	1	PWR		Cancelled plan	Corral Canyon	California	462		1963	-	1972	
Marble Hill	1	PWR	WH 4-Loop	Cancelled construction	Paynesville	Indiana	1,030	1,090	1973	1977-07-01	1984-01-01	
Marble Hill	2	PWR	WH 4-Loop	Cancelled construction	Paynesville	Indiana	1,130	1,190	1973	1977-07-01	1984-01-01	
Mayport	1				Mayport	Florida			1969	-	-	
Mayport	2				Mayport	Florida			1969	-	-	
Midland	1	PWR	B&W	Cancelled construction	Midland	Michigan	491	526	1968	1973-03-01	1986-07-01	
Midland	2	PWR	B&W	Cancelled construction	Midland	Michigan	816	855	1968	1973-03-01	1986-07-01	
Montague	1	BWR	GE BWR-6	Cancelled plan	Montague	Massachusetts	1,150	1,298	1974	-	1980-12-01	
Montague	2	BWR	GE BWR-6	Cancelled plan	Montague	Massachusetts	1,150	1,298	1974	-	1980-12-01	
Newbold Island (relocated to Hope Creek)	1	BWR	GE	Cancelled plan	Bordentown	New Jersey			-	-	-	
Newbold Island (relocated to Hope Creek)	2	BWR	GE	Cancelled plan	Bordentown	New Jersey			-	-	-	
New England (NEP)	1	PWR	WH 4-Loop	Cancelled plan	Charlestown	Rhode Island	1,150	1,194	1974	-	1980-01-01	
New England (NEP)	2	PWR	WH 4-Loop	Cancelled plan	Charlestown	Rhode Island	1,150	1,194	1974	-	1980-01-01	
New Haven	1	PWR		Cancelled plan	New Haven	New Jersey	1,250	1,300	1977	-	1980-01-01	
New Haven	2	PWR		Cancelled plan	New Haven	New Jersey	1,250	1,300	1977	-	1980-01-01	
Nine Mile Point	3	PWR	Areva EPR	Cancelled plan	Scriba	New York	1,600		2008	-	2013-11-25	
North Anna	3	PWR		Cancelled construction	Mineral	Virginia	907	950	1971	1971-06-01	1982-11-01	
North Anna	4	PWR		Cancelled construction	Mineral	Virginia	907	950	1971	1971-12-01	1980-11-01	
North Coast (formerly Aguirre/Isolte)	1	PWR		Cancelled plan	Arecibo	Puerto Rico	583	614	1970	-	1978-12-01	
North Coast (formerly Aguirre/Isolte)	2	PWR		Cancelled plan	Arecibo	Puerto Rico	-	-	1973	-	-	
NYSE&G	1	PWR		Cancelled plan		New York	1,250	-	1977	-	1980	
NYSE&G	2	PWR		Cancelled plan		New York	1,250	-	1977	-	1980	
Orange/Orlando	1	PWR		Cancelled plan	Orlando	Florida	1,300	1,360	1974	-	1975-12-01	
Orange/Orlando	2	PWR		Cancelled plan	Orlando	Florida	1,300	1,360	1974	-	1975-12-01	
Palo Verde	4	PWR	CE	Cancelled plan	Tonopah	Arizona	1,270	1,307	1977	-	1979-07-01	
Palo Verde	5	PWR	CE	Cancelled plan	Tonopah	Arizona	1,270	1,307	1977	-	1979-07-01	
Pebble Springs	1	PWR		Cancelled plan	Arlington	Oregon	1,260	1,314	1973	-	1982-09-01	
Pebble Springs	2	PWR		Cancelled plan	Arlington	Oregon	1,260	1,314	1974	-	1982-09-01	
Perkins	1	PWR		Cancelled plan	Mocksville	North Carolina	1,287	1,345	1973	-	1982-02-01	
Perkins	2	PWR		Cancelled plan	Mocksville	North Carolina	1,287	1,345	1973	-	1982-02-01	
Perkins	3	PWR		Cancelled plan	Mocksville	North Carolina	1,287	1,345	1973	-	1982-02-01	
Perry	2	BWR	GE	Cancelled construction	Perry	Ohio	1,205	1,250	1974	1974-10-01	1984-04-01	
Perryman	1	PWR		Cancelled plan	Baltimore	Maryland	845	880	1972	-	1972-11-01	
Perryman	2	PWR		Cancelled plan	Baltimore	Maryland	845	880	1972	-	1972-11-01	
Phipps Bend	1	BWR	GE	Cancelled construction	Kingsport	Tennessee	1,233	1,269	1974	1977-10-01	1982-08-01	
Phipps Bend	2	BWR	GE	Cancelled construction	Kingsport	Tennessee	1,233	1,269	1974	1977-10-01	1982-08-01	
Pilgrim	2	PWR		Cancelled plan	Plymouth	Massachusetts	1,180	1,240	1972	-	1981-09-01	
Pilgrim	3	PWR		Cancelled plan	Plymouth	Massachusetts	1,180	1,240	-	-	1974-07-01	
Quanicassee	1	PWR	WH 4-Loop	Cancelled plan	Bay City	Michigan	1,150		1972	-	1974	
Quanicassee	2	PWR	WH 4-Loop	Cancelled plan	Bay City	Michigan	1,150		1972	-	1974	
Ravenswood	1	PWR	Westinghouse	Cancelled plan	Long Island City	New York	750		1962	-	1964-01-06	
River Bend	2	BWR	GE BWR-6	Cancelled construction	St. Francisville	Louisiana	934	991	1973	1975-08-01	1984-01-01	
River Bend	3	BWR	GVH ESBWR	Cancelled plan	St. Francisville	Louisiana	1520	1600	-	-	2015-12-04	
San Joaquin Nuclear Project	1			Cancelled plan	Kern County	California	1300		1973	-	1978-03-31	
San Joaquin Nuclear Project	2			Cancelled plan	Kern County	California	1300		1973	-	1978-03-31	
San Joaquin Nuclear Project	3			Cancelled plan	Kern County	California	1300		1973	-	1978-03-31	
San Joaquin Nuclear Project	4			Cancelled plan	Kern County	California	1300		1973	-	1978-03-31	
Satsop (WNP-3/WPPSS-3)	3	PWR	Combustion Engineering	Cancelled construction	Elma	Washington	1,240	1,324	1973	1977-04-01	1983-01-01	
Satsop (WNP-5/WPPSS-5)	5	PWR	Combustion Engineering	Cancelled construction	Elma	Washington	1,240	1,316	1974	1977-04-01	1982-01-01	
Seabrook	2	PWR	WH 4LP (DRYAMB)	Cancelled construction	Seabrook	New Hampshire	1,149	1,199	1972	1976-07-01	1988-01-01	
Sears Isle	1	PWR	WH 4-Loop	Cancelled plan	Sears Island	Maine	1,150		1974	-	1977	
Shearon Harris	2	PWR	WH 3-Loop	Cancelled construction	Bonsal	North Carolina	900	960	1971	1978-01-01	1983-12-01 (2013)	
Shearon Harris	3	PWR	WH 3-Loop	Cancelled construction	Bonsal	North Carolina	900	960	1971	1978-01-01	1983-12-01 (2013)	
Shearon Harris	4	PWR	WH 3-Loop	Cancelled construction	Bonsal	North Carolina	900	960	1971	1978-01-01	1983-12-01	
Shearon Harris	2	PWR	WH AP1000	Cancelled plan	Bonsal	North Carolina	1,117	1,250	-	-	2013-05-02	
Shearon Harris	3	PWR	WH AP1000	Cancelled plan	Bonsal	North Carolina	1,117	1,250	-	-	2013-05-02	
Skagit-Hanford	1	BWR	GE	Cancelled plan	Sedro Woolley	Washington	1,275	1,335	1973	-	1983-08-01	
Skagit-Hanford	2	BWR	GE	Cancelled plan	Sedro Woolley	Washington	1,275	1,335	1974	-	1983-08-01	
Somerset	1	BWR	GE	Cancelled plan	Somerset	New York	1,190	1,247	1974	-	1977-05-01	
Somerset	2	BWR	GE	Cancelled plan	Somerset	New York	1,190	1,247	1974	-	1977-05-01	
South Dade	1	PWR		Cancelled plan	Miami-Dade County	Florida	1,150	1,210	1975	-	1977-05-01	
South Dade	2	PWR		Cancelled plan	Miami-Dade County	Florida	1,150	1,210	1975	-	1977-05-01	
South River	1	PWR		Cancelled plan		North Carolina	1,150	1,200	1973	-	1979-01-01	
South River	2	PWR		Cancelled plan		North Carolina	1,150	1,200	1973	-	1979-01-01	
South River	3	PWR		Cancelled plan		North Carolina	1,150	1,200	1973	-	1974-12-01	
South Texas	3	BWR	Toshiba ABWR	Cancelled plan	Matagorda County	Texas					2018	
South Texas	4	BWR	Toshiba ABWR	Cancelled plan	Matagorda County	Texas					2018	
Stanislaus	1	BWR	GE	Cancelled plan	Stanislaus County	California	1,100	1,200	1971	-	1979	
Stanislaus	2	BWR	GE	Cancelled plan	Stanislaus County	California	1,100	1,200	1971	-	1979	
Sterling	1	PWR		Cancelled plan	Oswego	New York	1,150	1,185	1973	-	1980-01-01	
Summit	1	HTGR	GA	Cancelled plan	Whitehall	Delaware	770	781	1971	-	1975-11-01	
Summit	2	HTGR	GA	Cancelled plan	Whitehall	Delaware	770	781	1971	-	1975-11-01	
Sundesert	1	PWR	WH 3-Loop	Cancelled plan	Blythe	California	934	978	1975	-	1978-05-01	
Sundesert	2	PWR	WH 3-Loop	Cancelled plan	Blythe	California	934	978	1975	-	1978-05-01	
Surry	3	PWR	WH 3-Loop	Cancelled construction	Louisa County	Virginia	859	919	1972	1974-01-01	1977-03-01	
Surry	4	PWR	WH 3-Loop	Cancelled construction	Louisa County	Virginia	859	919	1972	1974-01-01	1977-03-01	
Tyrone	1	PWR		Cancelled plan	Durand	Wisconsin	1,150	1,188	1973	-	1979-07-01	
Tyrone	2	PWR		Cancelled plan	Durand	Wisconsin	1,150	1,188	1973	-	1975-12-01	
Vandalia (Iowa)	1	PWR		Cancelled plan	Vandalia	Iowa	1,270	1,300	1976	-	1982-02-01	
Vidal	1	HTGR	GA	Cancelled plan	Vidal Valley	California	770		1972	-	1974	
Vidal	2	HTGR	GA	Cancelled plan	Vidal Valley	California	770		1972	-	1974	
V.C. Summer	2	PWR	WH AP1000	Cancelled construction	Jenkinsville	South Carolina	1,117	1,250	2008	2013-03-09	2017-07-31	
V.C. Summer	3	PWR	WH AP1000	Cancelled construction	Jenkinsville	South Carolina	1,117	1,250	2008	2013-03-09	2017-07-31	
Verplanck (formerly Indian Point-4)	1	BWR	GE	Cancelled plan	Buchanan	New York	1,100	1,115	1968	-	1975	
Verplanck (formerly Indian Point-5)	2	BWR	GE	Cancelled plan	Buchanan	New York	1,100	1,115	1968	-	1975	
Victoria County Station	1	BWR	GVH ESBWR	Cancelled plan	Victoria County	Texas	1,535		2008	-	2012-08-28	
Victoria County Station	2	BWR	GVH ESBWR	Cancelled plan	Victoria County	Texas	1,535		2008	-	2012-08-28	
Vogtle	3	PWR	WH 4-Loop	Cancelled plan (1970s plan; Unit 3 AP1000 finished construction 2023)	Burke County	Georgia	1,113		1973	-	1974	
Vogtle	4	PWR	WH 4-Loop	Cancelled plan (1970s plan; Unit 4 AP1000 finished construction 2024)	Burke County	Georgia	1,113		1973	-	1974	
Yellow Creek	1	PWR		Cancelled construction	Corinth	Mississippi	1,285	1,339	1974	1978-02-01	1984-08-30	
Yellow Creek	2	PWR		Cancelled construction	Corinth	Mississippi	1,285	1,339	1974	1978-02-01	1984-08-30	
Zimmer (converted to coal)	1	BWR	GE	Cancelled construction	Moscow	Ohio	810	840	1969	1972-10-01	1984-01-01	
Zimmer	2	BWR	GE	Cancelled plan	Moscow	Ohio	1,125	1,172	1974	-	1984-01-01	

- "Model" column key: "B&W" is Babcock & Wilcox; "CE" is Combustion Engineering; "GA" is General Atomics; "GE" is General Electric; "GVH" is GE Vernova Hitachi Nuclear Energy; "MHI" is Mitsubishi Heavy Industries; and "WH" is Westinghouse.

== See also ==
- Prospective nuclear units in the United States
