= Hartsville Nuclear Plant =

Cancelled nuclear power plant project in Tennessee, United States

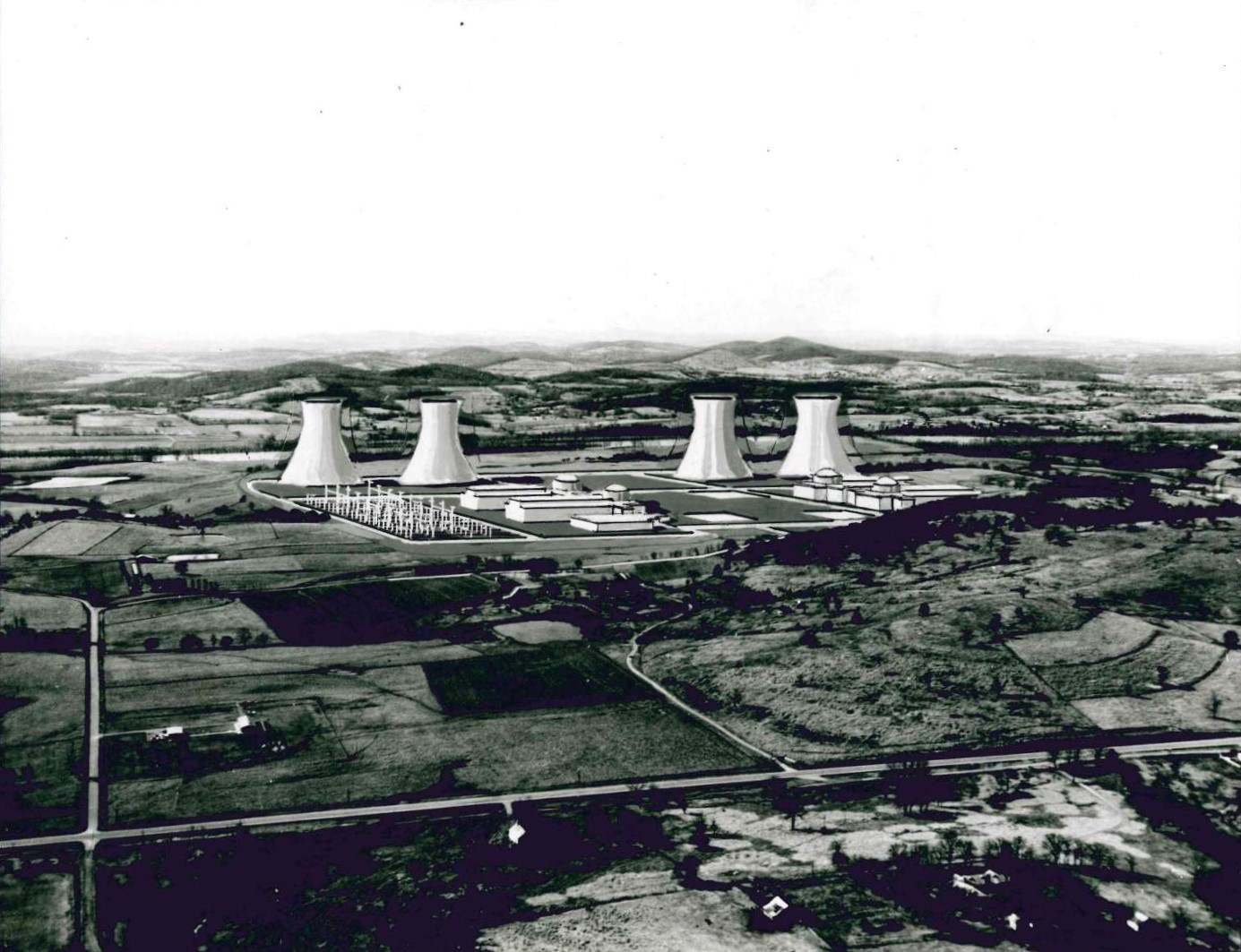
- TVA illustration of Hartsville Nuclear Plant
- Country: United States
- Location: Trousdale County, Tennessee near Harstville, U.S.
- Coordinates: 36°21′15″N 86°05′09″W
- Status: Cancelled
- Construction began: April 28th, 1977
- Decommission date: August 29th, 1984
- Construction cost: $2.7 billion (equivalent to $14.35 billion in 2025)
- Owner: Tennessee Valley Authority
- Operator: Tennessee Valley Authority

Nuclear power station
- Reactors: 4 × BWR/6
- Reactor type: BWR
- Reactor supplier: General Electric
- Cooling towers: 4 × Natural Draft
- Cooling source: Cumberland River

Power generation
- Units planned: 4 × 1233 MW
- Units cancelled: 4 × 1233 MW

External links
- Commons: Related media on Commons

The Hartsville Nuclear Plant was a cancelled nuclear power plant project located near Hartsville, Tennessee. To be built and operated by the Tennessee Valley Authority (TVA), it was to have four General Electric boiling water reactors.

== Planning ==
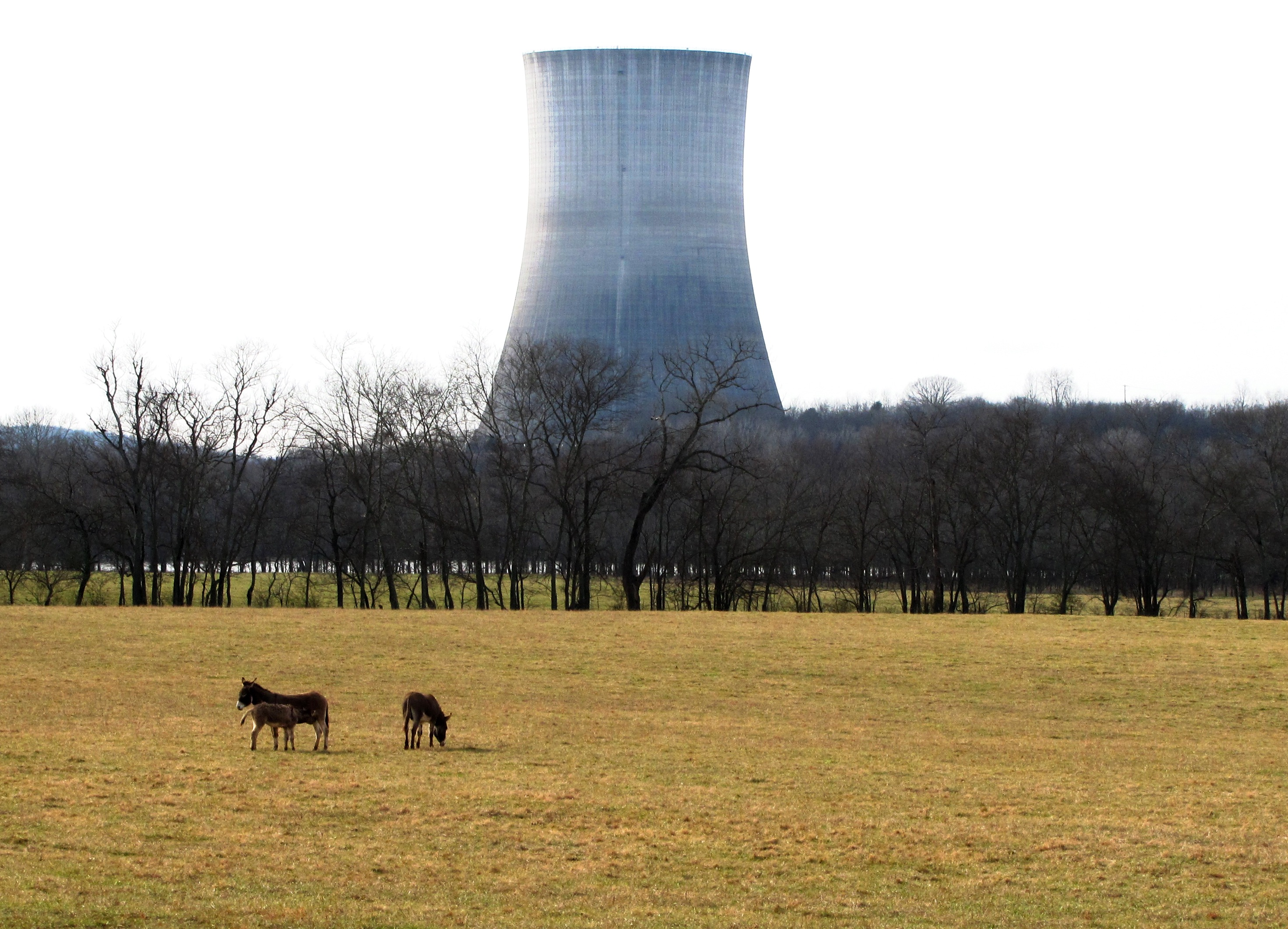
The now-demolished cooling tower from the cancelled plant

In the 1960s, TVA began expecting a large increase in the electrical demand for the 1970s and 1980s. TVA ordered 7 nuclear power plants to meet this. These plants include Browns Ferry, Sequoyah, Watts Bar, Bellefonte, Phipps Bend, Yellow Creek, and Hartsville. Land along the Cumberland River was acquired by TVA in the late 1960s through early 1970s for construction of the plant. TVA released their draft environmental impact statement for the construction of the four-unit General Electric BWR/6 in late 1974. It was planned to be the largest nuclear power plant in the world at the time.

The power plant was split up into two plants, Plant A (units A1 & A2) and Plant B (units B1 & B2). Each reactor would operate at 3,579 MWth, and have an electrical output of 1,233 MWe, giving the whole plant a potential output of nearly 5 gigawatts. The units were cooled both by a natural draft cooling tower and a spray pond. The cooling tower was 535 feet tall.

The turbo generators were to be manufactured by Brown, Boveri & Cie (Now ABB Ltd), a Swiss electrical engineering company. It was designed for 1800 RPM, max wattage of 1,285 MWe, and max voltage of 24,000 V.

== Construction ==
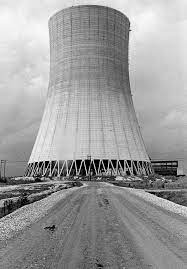
Hartsville Nuclear Power Plant Cooling tower 1983

Limited construction began in 1974 after the issuance of the early work permits, and full scale construction began with the issuance of construction permits in April 1977. Existing housing was demolished to make way for the new reactors. The spray ponds were partially dug out, the water intake pumping station were partially constructed, and the foundations of the condensate circulating water pumping stations had been built prior to cancellation. The switchyards on both plants were either partially or fully completed before cancellation.

=== Unit A1 ===
Unit A1 was the most complete before cancellation at 44% completion. The reactor pressure vessel (RPV) was installed, and parts of the Mark III containment structure were in place. The turbine hall floor had just begun construction, leaving large holes to the condenser hall from where the turbines and generator would have been. The cooling tower's main concrete structure was completed, however it is missing the inner components.

=== Unit A2 ===
Unit A2 was 34% complete. The reactor pressure vessel had been installed but was missing many parts of the containment structure. The turbine hall floor is in similar condition to the one in unit A1. The cooling tower's steel frame base was completed, but the main structure had not begun construction.

=== Unit B1 ===
Unit B1 was 17% complete. The support structure for the RPV had just began construction. The condenser hall was dug out completely. The cooling tower did not begin construction.

=== Unit B2 ===
Unit B2 was at 7% completion. The foundations for the containment building had just begun, but the walls were not added yet. The auxiliary building had completed the walls on the lowest floor but was either demolished or covered up with soil after the cancellation. The condenser hall was dug out completely. Cooling tower construction had not begun.

== Cancellation and legacy ==
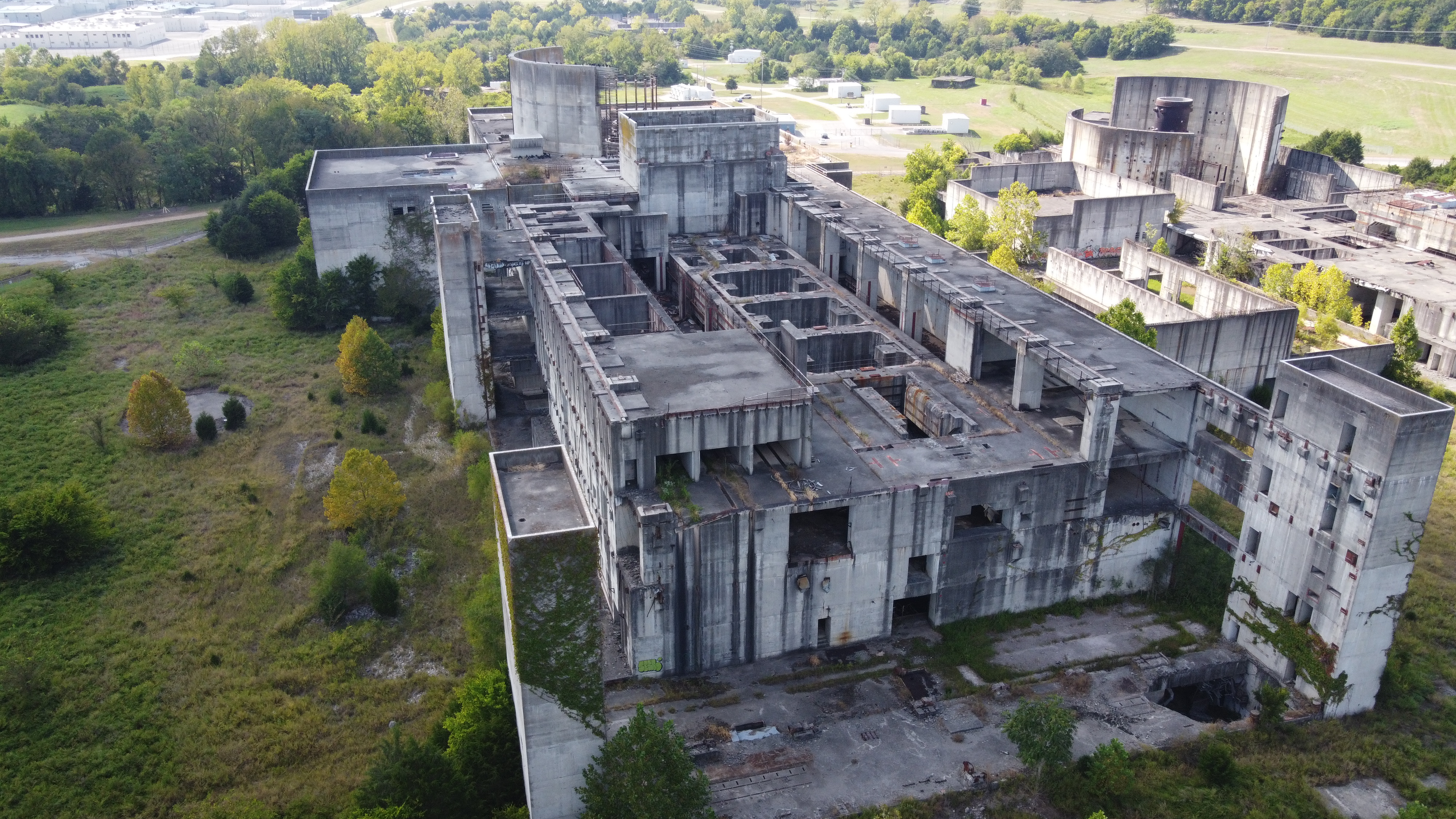
Plant A as viewed from the East (Turbo Generator Side)

In 1979 the Three Mile Island Nuclear Accident had sprouted a new anti-nuclear wave, which had affected public opinion on the Hartsville plant. At the time, the projected cost was $13.8 billion (equivalent to $44.61 billion in 2025), more than TVA spent creating its entire power system at the time.

The killing blow came when it became evident to TVA that the electricity demand they had projected for the 1980s was nonexistent. TVA had decided to cancel the Plant B reactors indefinitely on March 22, 1983. In July 1984, TVA staff recommended the shutdown of Plant A to their Board of directors, citing possible cost increases, and the power demand situation. The TVA decided to pull the plug on the final 2 reactors, and shut down Plant A on August 29, 1984.

The site today remains abandoned. A few small buildings were demolished, but the main structures remain intact. The Tennessee Valley Authority sold 550 acres (220 ha) of the 1,940-acre (790 ha) of the Hartsville site to the Four Lake Regional Industrial Development Authority for $1.7 million to form the PowerCom Industrial Center. In August 2002, a uranium enrichment facility was proposed to be constructed on the site of the power plant to be operated by Louisiana Energy Services. It secured a backing of $1.1 billion (equivalent to $1.97 billion in 2025) but the location was quickly changed in mid 2003 due to public opposition. The site location would be changed to New Mexico and is now the National Enrichment Facility. The Trousdale Turner Correctional Center, a private prison operated by CoreCivic, began operations on the site in 2016. The single cooling tower was eventually imploded on September 18, 2025, and there is currently no announced plans for future land use at that location.

== Gallery ==
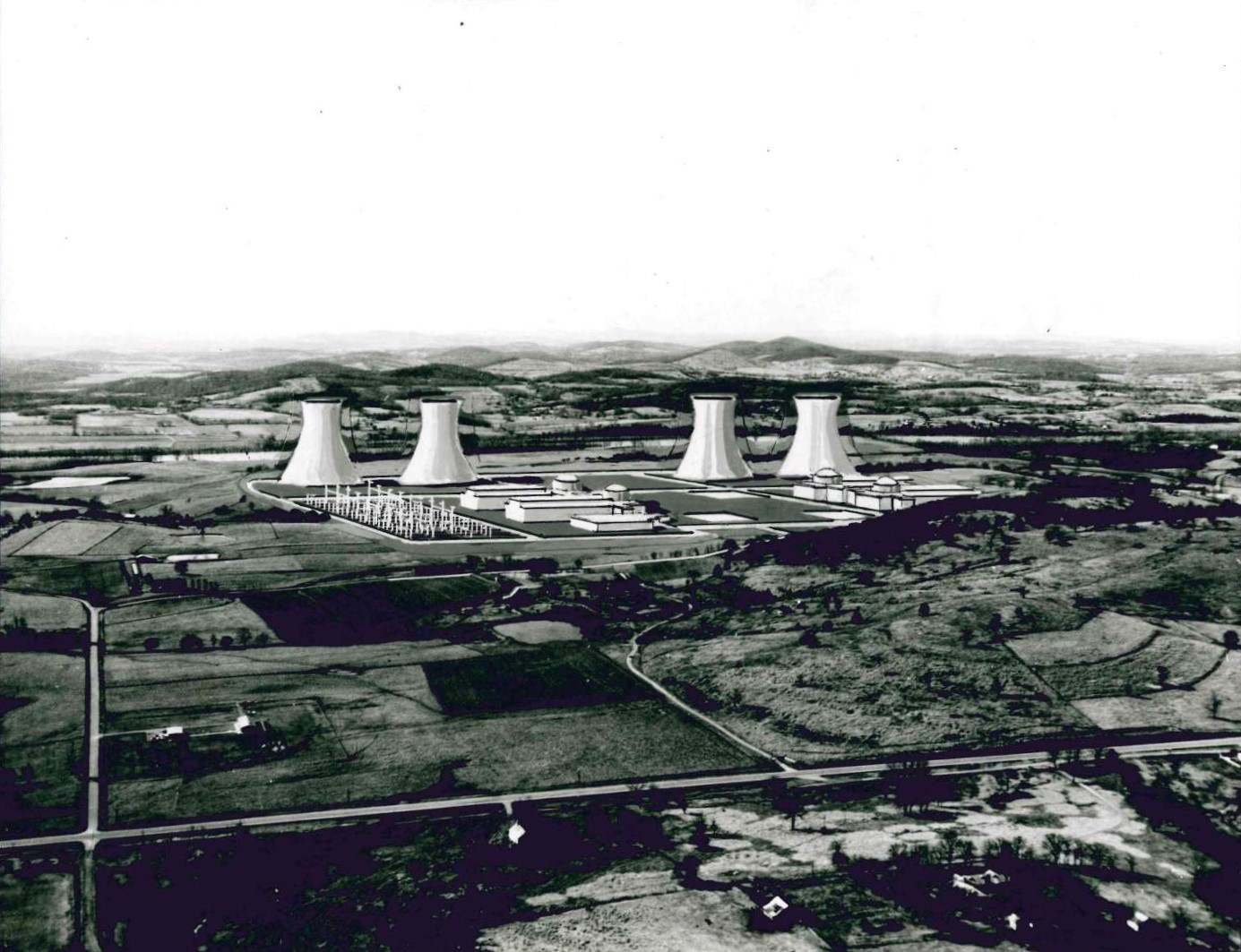
TVA illustration of Hartsville Nuclear Plant

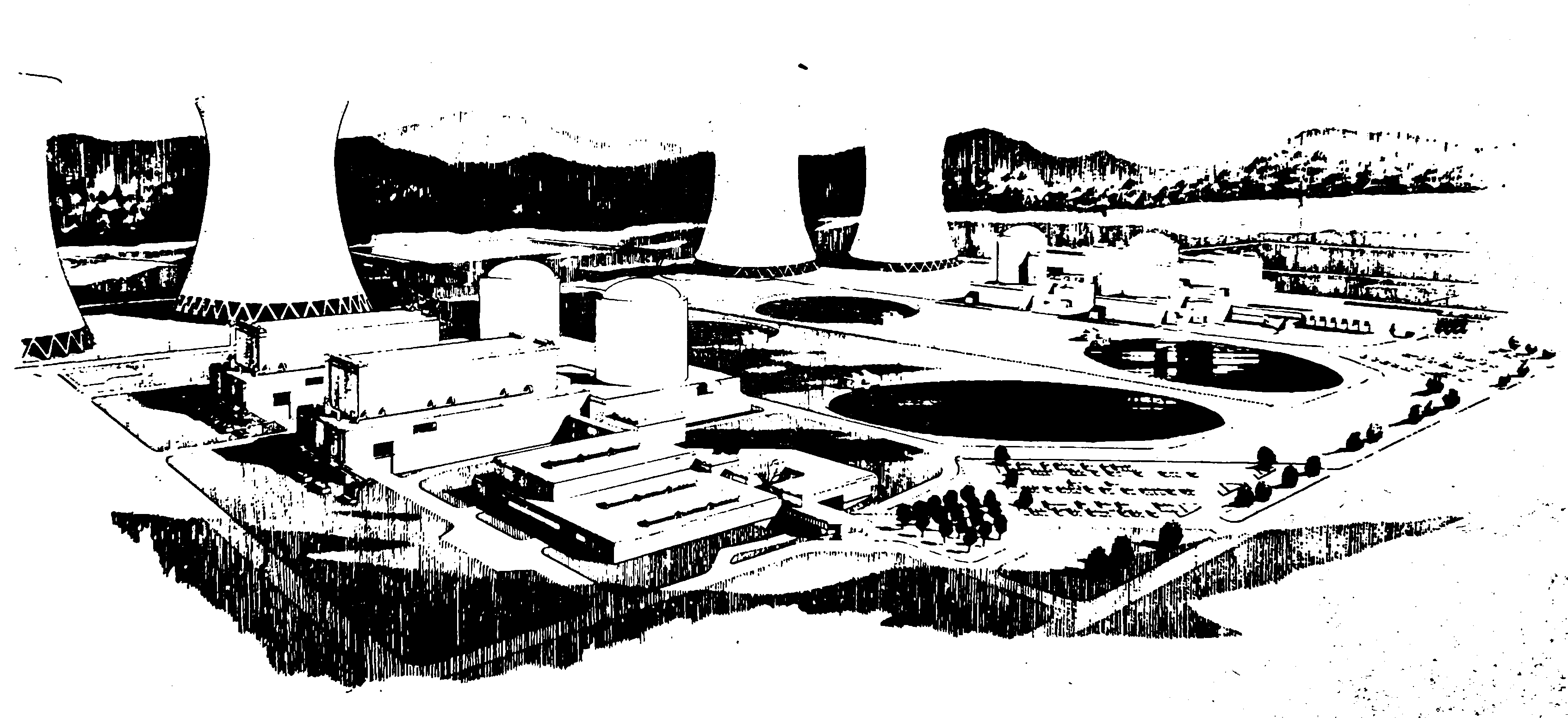
TVA illustration of Hartsville Nuclear Plant

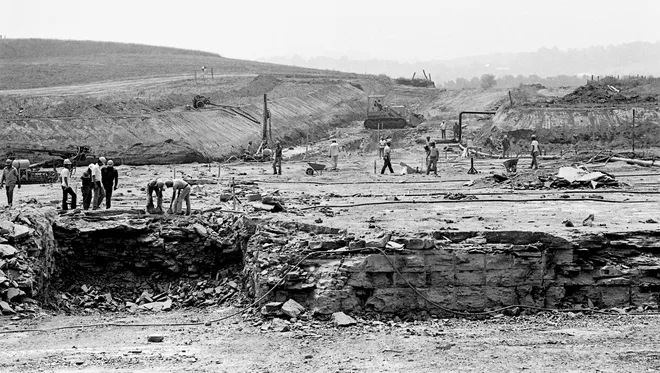
Construction photo from July 10, 1976 (Possibly of the Intake channel being dug)

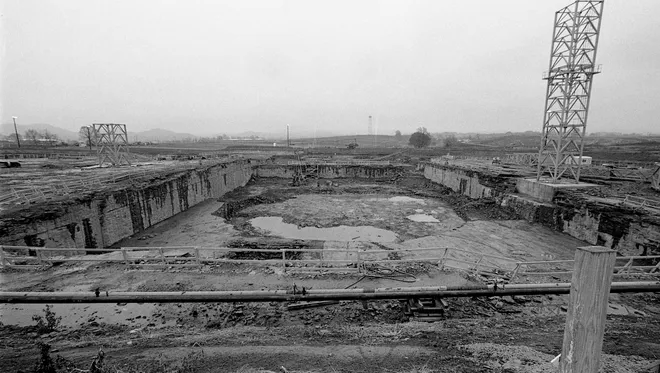
Construction photo from November 14, 1976 of the reactor building of unit A1, facing east

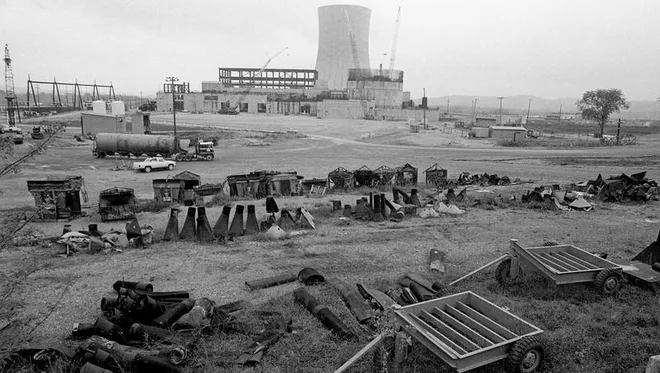
Construction photo from May 15, 1983 of the Plant A reactors and the cooling tower, facing south

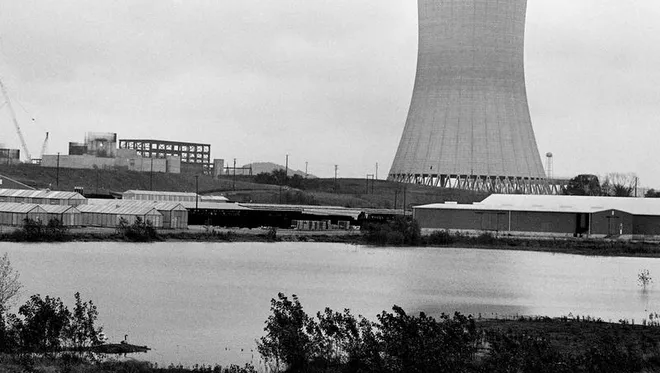
Construction photo from May 15, 1983 of the Plant A reactors and cooling tower from the south-west holding pond, facing north-east

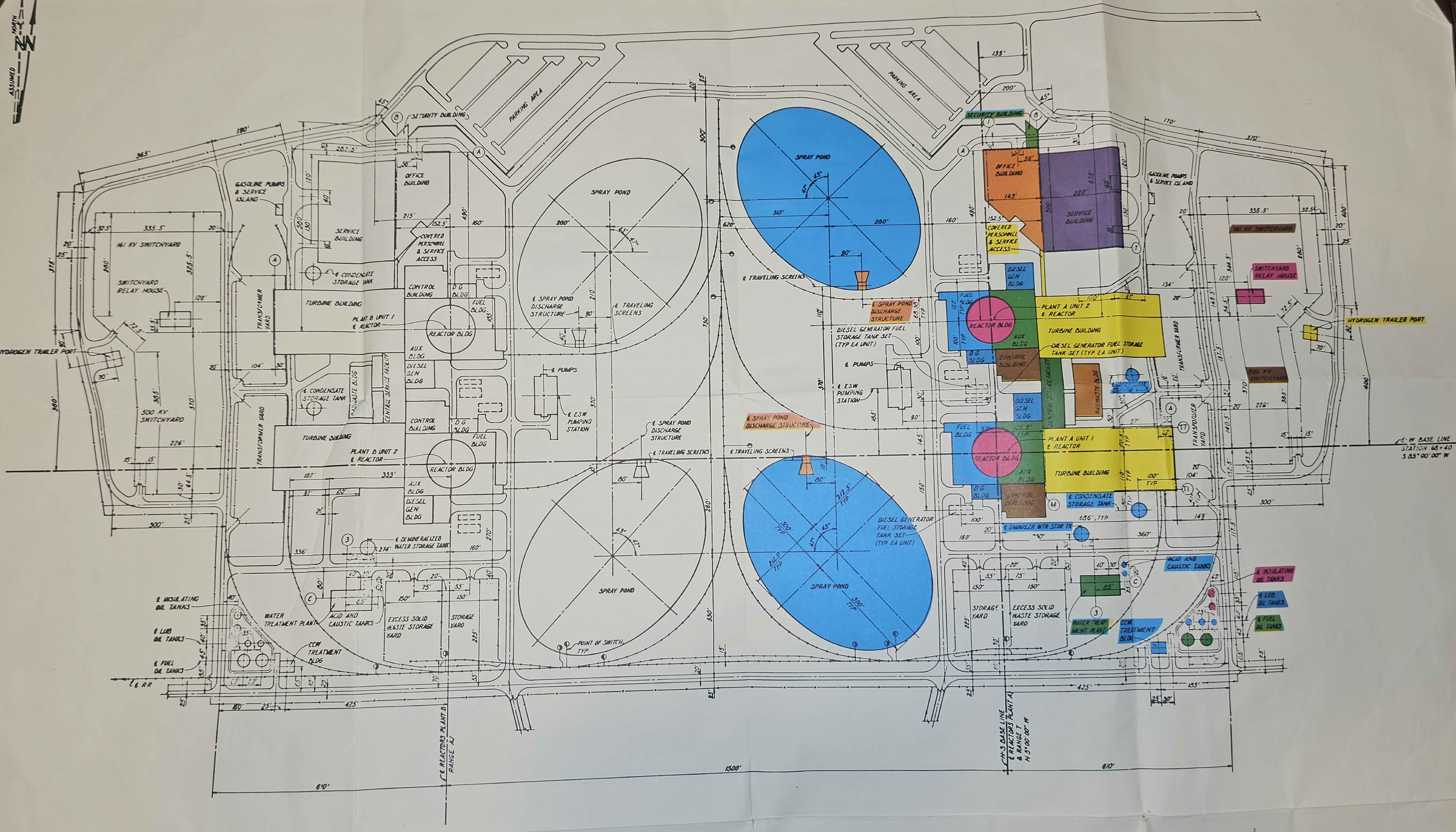
TVA drawing of the Site map (excluding cooling towers, would be located to the south of each plant)

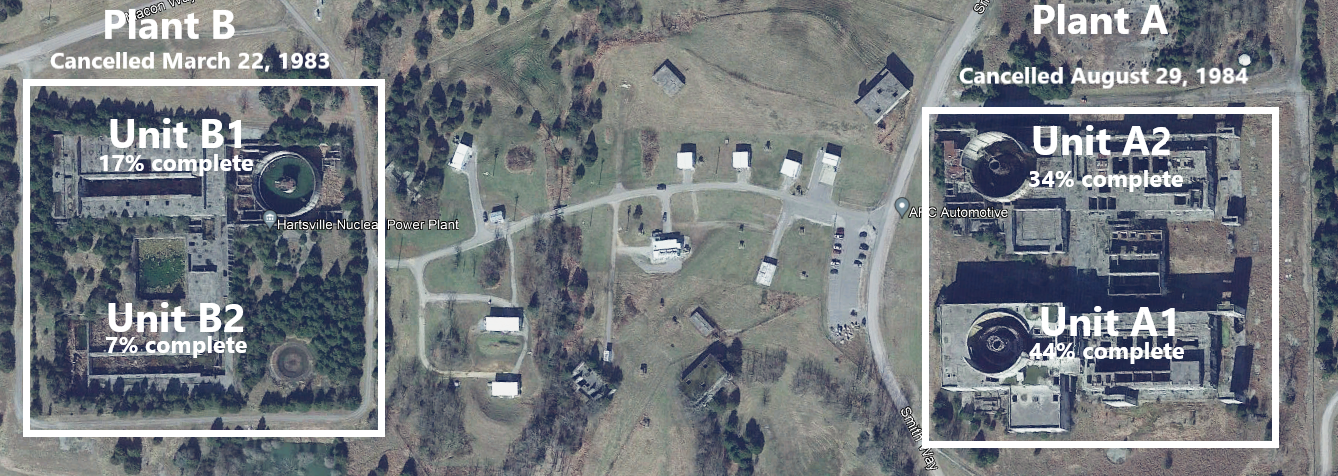
Map of Plant A and Plant B

== See also ==
- List of canceled nuclear reactors in the United States
