= Phipps Bend Nuclear Plant =

Uncompleted nuclear power plant in Hawkins County, Tennessee

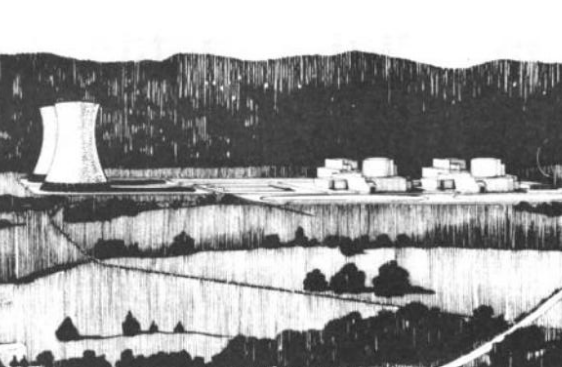
- TVA illustration of Phipps Bend Nuclear Plant
- Country: United States
- Location: Hawkins County, Tennessee near Surgoinsville, U.S.
- Coordinates: 36°28′1″N 82°48′27″W
- Status: Cancelled
- Construction began: November 10, 1977
- Decommission date: August 6th, 1981
- Construction cost: $2.6 billion (equivalent to $13.81 billion in 2025)
- Owner: Tennessee Valley Authority
- Operator: Tennessee Valley Authority

Nuclear power station
- Reactor type: BWR
- Reactor supplier: General Electric
- Cooling towers: 2 × Natural Draft
- Cooling source: Holston River

Power generation
- Units cancelled: 2 × 1233 MW

Phipps Bend Nuclear Plant was a planned nuclear power generation facility that was to be constructed and operated by the Tennessee Valley Authority (TVA) in unincorporated Hawkins County, Tennessee. Proposed to house two reactor units, the power plant was estimated to cost $1.6 billion when it was first planned in late 1977, provide a generating capacity of 2,600 megawatts (MWe). Following negative public reactions towards nuclear energy following the Three Mile Island accident and a decreasing demand for power due to regional economic decline, the TVA's board of directors voted to defer further construction of the power plant. By 1981, the plant was 40% complete and an estimated $1.5 billion in planning, engineering, and construction costs had accumulated. Construction never resumed, and the project was canceled overall in 1982 due to lower load growth than forecast. By the project's cancellation, the TVA had amassed over $2.6 billion in spending for the incomplete nuclear facility. After being auctioned off by the TVA in 1987, the land acquired for the plant would be under the ownership of Hawkins County's industrial development board, who converted most of the site into an industrial park, originally named the Phipps Bend Industrial Park, and later the Phipps Bend Advanced Manufacturing & Technology Campus. A 1 MW solar farm was built at the site in 2017.

== Planning ==
With the emergence of developing nuclear power technology by the 1950s and 1960s, the TVA initiated a nuclear development plan by the mid-1960s to build seven nuclear power generation stations across the Tennessee Valley: Browns Ferry, Sequoyah, Watts Bar, Bellefonte, Hartsville, Yellow Creek, and Phipps Bend. This was a result of new interest regarding the environmental efficiency of nuclear power while having a baseload as powerful as the fossil fuel facilities the TVA had constructed the decades prior. In 1974, the TVA's first nuclear reactor was placed into operation at the Browns Ferry facility near Huntsville, Alabama.

Interest for a nuclear power plant in Hawkins County was reported as early as 1972, when a community club expressed enthusiasm for a breeder reactor unit at the John Sevier Fossil Plant near the county seat of Rogersville. By 1974, the TVA announced plans for a two-unit nuclear power generation station in the Phipps Bend area of Hawkins County, citing the level acreage along the banks of the Holston River. The TVA acquired nearly 1,300 acres of farmland on the northern shore of the Holston River primarily through eminent domain. Infrastructure upgrades both on-site and off-site were underway to prepare for the power plant, including the widening of U.S. Route 11W into a four-lane limited-access highway from Kingsport to Rogersville, and over $2 million in the construction of water and sewage systems to access the plant site from the public works department of Rogersville. The TVA provided funding for industrial access roads to Phipps Bend from US 11W.

For the Phipps Bend reactor units, the TVA purchased two BWR-6 boiling water reactors supplied by General Electric. The Phipps Bend reactors had a net output of nearly 2600 MWe.

== Construction ==
Construction on Phipps Bend began with the demolition of existing structures on the project site in April 1977 and drilling for core samples for geotechnical work. Value of the project increased an additional billion dollars following change orders and rising costs in construction materials. The project employed a peak construction workforce of over 2,500 workers.

=== Unit 1 ===
By the cancellation of the Phipps Bend project, the most near-complete portion of the overall project was the structure of the Unit 1 reactor. The reactor shell for the unit was completed. The steel frame base for the cooling tower for Unit 1 was also complete by the cancellation. Overall, Phipps Bend Unit 1 was 29% complete by the project's cancellation.

=== Unit 2 ===
Phipps Bend Unit 2 was 5% complete overall by the project's cancellation.

== Cancellation and legacy ==
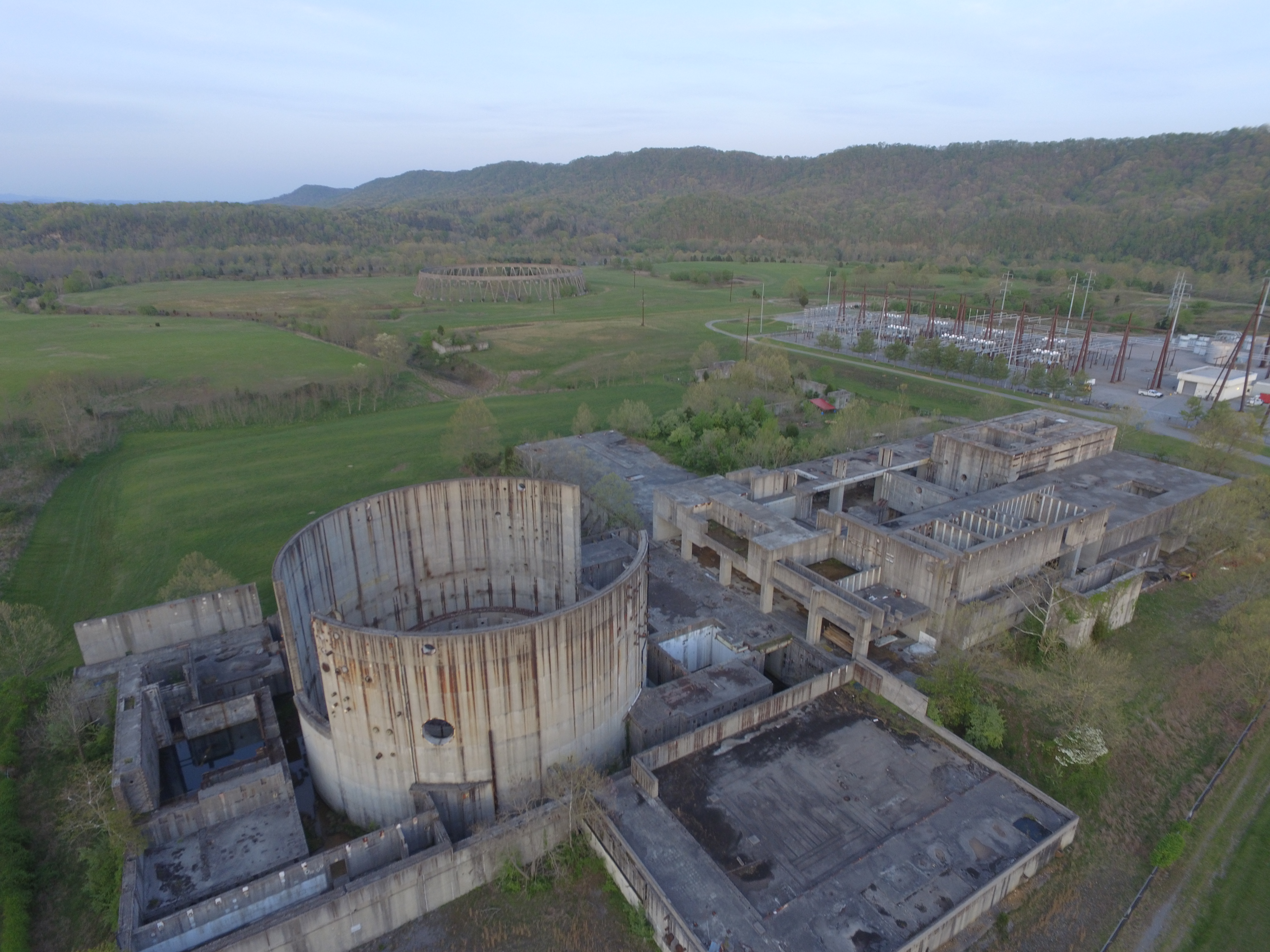
Remains of the Unit 1 reactor shell, with cooling tower base in the background.

In 1981, the TVA board of directors voted unanimously to defer further construction of the Phipps Bend nuclear project in a conference at the TVA's twin tower complex in downtown Knoxville. More than 100 individuals attended the conference to protest the deferment, with over 40 Hawkins County residents wearing yellow armbands signifying that they were "hostages" to the TVA. In 1987, the TVA auctioned off the Phipps Bend site and the incomplete nuclear facility to Phipps Bend Joint Venture LLC, an industrial development group consisting of Hawkins County and Kingsport officials.

Charlotte, North Carolina–based renewable energy firm Birdseye Renewable Energy announced in a partnership with Atlanta-based United Renewable Energy to construct a photovoltaic power station at the Phipps Bend site. The six-acre facility, consisting of more than 3,000 solar panels, was completed in 2017 at a cost of $1.8 million. Birdseye has contracted to sell its power to Holston Electric Cooperative, an electricity distributor based in Hawkins and Hamblen counties. The TVA assisted in the project with its Solar Solutions Initiative, which provides financial incentives for solar power projects in the Tennessee Valley.

In August 2025, approximately 146 acres at the site were leased to Highland Materials, an American-based polysilicon manufacturing firm, which included the site of steel base structure of the Unit 1 cooling tower. Around this same time, the Phipps Bend Industrial Park was renamed as the Phipps Bend Advanced Manufacturing & Technology Campus.

== See also ==
- List of canceled nuclear reactors in the United States
