= Mosel, Wisconsin =

- Town
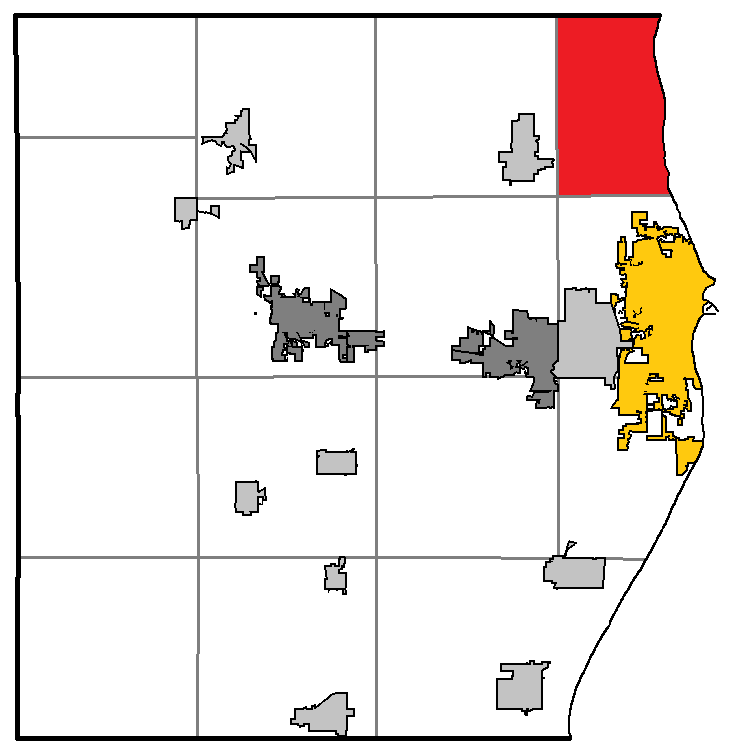
- Location of Mosel, within Sheboygan County
- Coordinates: 43°50′53″N 87°45′44″W
- Country: United States
- State: Wisconsin
- County: Sheboygan

Area
  - Total: 21.1 sq mi (54.7 km^{2})
  - Land: 21.1 sq mi (54.7 km^{2})
  - Water: 0 sq mi (0.0 km^{2})
- Elevation: 682 ft (208 m)

Population (2020)
  - Total: 748
  - Density: 35.4/sq mi (13.7/km^{2})
- Time zone: UTC-6 (Central (CST))
  - Summer (DST): UTC-5 (CDT)
- Area code: 920
- FIPS code: 55-54475
- GNIS feature ID: 1583756
- Website: moselwi.gov

Mosel or Moselle is a town in Sheboygan County, Wisconsin, United States. The population was 748 at the 2020 census. The town is included in the Sheboygan, Wisconsin Metropolitan Statistical Area.

== Communities ==
- Haven is an unincorporated community located along County Road FF, west of the highway's intersection with County Road LS west of Whistling Straits. After serving as a military installation for 10 years, plans were to convert the site to a power plant operated by Wisconsin Power & Light, although they never materialized which eventually resulted in the opening of Whistling Straits. The golf course hosted the 2021 Ryder Cup.
- Mosel is an unincorporated community located at the intersection of County Road LS and Playbird Road. The southern portion of the community dips into the town of Sheboygan.

== Geography ==
According to the United States Census Bureau, the town has a total area of 21.1 square miles (54.8 km^{2}), all land.

== Demographics ==
As of the census of 2000, there were 839 people, 310 households, and 248 families residing in the town. The population density was 39.7 people per square mile (15.3/km^{2}). There were 323 housing units at an average density of 15.3 per square mile (5.9/km^{2}). The racial makeup of the town was 99.52% White, 0.12% African American, 0.12% Asian, and 0.24% from two or more races. Hispanic or Latino of any race were 0.60% of the population.

There were 310 households, out of which 28.7% had children under the age of 18 living with them, 73.2% were married couples living together, 4.2% had a female householder with no husband present, and 19.7% were non-families. 15.8% of all households were made up of individuals, and 7.4% had someone living alone who was 65 years of age or older. The average household size was 2.71 and the average family size was 3.00.

In the town, the population was spread out, with 23.4% under the age of 18, 5.8% from 18 to 24, 25.7% from 25 to 44, 33.4% from 45 to 64, and 11.7% who were 65 years of age or older. The median age was 42 years. For every 100 females, there were 103.1 males. For every 100 females age 18 and over, there were 108.1 males.

The median income for a household in the town was $55,833, and the median income for a family was $61,250. Males had a median income of $37,566 versus $25,446 for females. The per capita income for the town was $21,953. About 1.6% of families and 1.4% of the population were below the poverty line, including none of those under age 18 and 2.3% of those age 65 or over.

== Recreation ==
- The Whistling Straits golf course is in the town, in Haven.

== Notable people ==
- Julius A. Furer, Rear admiral, U.S. Navy
- Herman Hedrich, Wisconsin State Representative and farmer, lived on a farm in the town
