= Erie Nuclear Power Plant =

Cancelled nuclear power plant in Ohio, USA

Coordinates: 41.3463°N 082.3598°W

The Erie Nuclear Power Plant was a proposed nuclear power plant to be located 9 miles (14 km) southeast of Sandusky, Ohio. It was proposed in 1976 by Ohio Edison (a forerunner of FirstEnergy) for the Central Area Power Coordination (CAPCO). The plant was to consist of two Babcock & Wilcox 1,267 megawatt reactors. Unit 1 was scheduled to be complete in 1986, Unit 2 in 1988. Preliminary work was canceled in 1980 due to new federal requirements placed on nuclear plants that make their construction more expensive and by a drop in anticipated customer energy demand.

== See also ==
- List of books about nuclear issues
- Nuclear power debate
- Nuclear power in the United States
- List of canceled nuclear plants in the United States
