= Allens Creek Nuclear Power Plant =

Coordinates: 29.68°N 96.10°W

The Allens Creek Nuclear Power Plant was a proposed nuclear power plant to be located near Wallis, Texas, less than 50 miles from the western edge of Houston. The plant, consisting of two 1,150 MWe General Electric boiling water reactors, was ordered by Houston Lighting and Power Company (HL&P) in 1973, but public opposition, fueled in part by press coverage of problems at other nuclear plants around the country, led to lengthy public hearings and court action. In the meantime, construction costs escalated and the plant was officially canceled in 1982.

== See also ==
- Anti-nuclear movement in the United States
- List of books about nuclear issues
- Nuclear power debate
- Nuclear power in the United States
- Bodega Bay Nuclear Power Plant
- Black Fox Nuclear Power Plant
