= Montague Nuclear Power Plant =

Cancelled nuclear power plant in Massachusetts

Coordinates: 42.576132°N 72.52667°W

The Montague Nuclear Power Plant was a proposed nuclear power plant to be located in Montague, Massachusetts. The plant was to consist of two 1150 MWe General Electric boiling water reactors. The project was proposed in 1973 and canceled in 1980, after $29 million was spent on the project.

On 22 February 1974, George Washington's Birthday, organic farmer Sam Lovejoy took a crowbar to the weather-monitoring tower which had been erected at the site on the Montague Plains. Lovejoy felled 349 feet of the 550-foot tower and then took himself to the local police station, where he presented a statement in which he took full responsibility for the action. Lovejoy went on trial in September 1974 on charges of malicious destruction, but was acquitted on a technicality. Lovejoy's action galvanized local public opinion against the plant which ended the project entirely.

In 1975, Green Mountain Post Films made Lovejoy's Nuclear War which told the story of the tower toppling and subsequent trial. The documentary film was instrumental in organizing the anti-nuclear movement. Lovejoy, and other members of the Montague Farm commune, such as Anna Gyorgy and Harvey Wasserman, helped to form the Clamshell Alliance anti-nuclear group. In 1977, the Clamshell Alliance was involved in a series of mass protests against the proposed Seabrook, NH twin nuclear plants. The series of protests occupying the proposed site of the Seabrook nuclear power reactor in New Hampshire resulted in over 1,400 arrests, garnered national publicity and inspired nuclear opposition groups in other parts of the United States.

Green Mountain Post Films, composed of producers Dan Keller and Charles Light (also Montague Farm commune members, went on to make The Last Resort, Early Warnings, Save the Planet, Training for Nonviolence and other films that helped organize a national anti-nuclear movement.

Lovejoy went on to become President of Musicians United for Safe Energy (MUSE) which organized five nights of benefit concerts at Madison Square Garden in 1979, featuring artist such as Jackson Browne, Bonnie Raitt, Bruce Springsteen, James Taylor, Carly Simon, Crosby, Stills and Nash and a host of other music stars. MUSE also staged a 250,000 person rally on what later became Battery Park City in lower Manhattan.

A total of 63 nuclear units were canceled in the USA between 1975 and 1980. Many nuclear plant proposals were no longer viable due to the downturn of electricity demand, significant cost and time overruns, and more complex regulatory requirements. Also, there was considerable public opposition to nuclear power in the US by this time.

== See also ==
- Anti-nuclear protests in the United States
- List of books about nuclear issues
- List of canceled nuclear plants in the United States
- Nuclear power debate
- Nuclear power in the United States
- Allen Young (writer)
