= William States Lee III =

American corporate executive (1929–1996)

William States Lee III, popularly known as Bill Lee (1929 – July 10, 1996) was an American business executive at Duke Power Company, known as the cofounder of the Institute of Nuclear Power Operations and initiator of the World Association of Nuclear Operators. In 1988 he was the recipient of the Henry Laurence Gantt Medal.

Lee was born in Charlotte, North Carolina in 1929. He attended Woodberry Forest School and was a magna cum laude and Phi Beta Kappa graduate of Princeton University in Civil Engineering. After serving in the United States Navy's SeaBees, Lee joined Duke Power's engineering department in 1955 as a junior engineer. He was promoted to engineering vice president in 1965, engineering and construction senior vice president in 1971, and executive vice president in 1976. He became president and chief operating officer of Duke Power Company in 1978 and chairman and chief executive officer in 1982.

Lee helped to form the Institute of Nuclear Power Operations after the Three Mile Island accident. He was also an initiator of the World Association of Nuclear Operators, in the wake of the Chernobyl disaster, becoming its first president. In 1989, he was named "CEO of the decade" by Financial World magazine.

Lee retired from Duke Power in 1994. He died of cardiac arrest in New York City July 10, 1996. A popular man and supporter of education, the College of Engineering at the University of North Carolina at Charlotte was named in his honor in 1994, as was the "Bill Lee Freeway", a stretch of Interstate Highway 77 north from Charlotte, and Duke Energy's William States Lee III Nuclear Generating Station in South Carolina. Lee was awarded the North Carolina Award for Public Service in 1988.
