= Levy County Nuclear Power Plant =

Cancelled nuclear power plant located in Levy County, Florida

- Country: United States
- Location: Levy County, Florida
- Coordinates: 29°4.4′N 82°37.3′W
- Status: Cancelled
- Construction cost: estimated $19–24 billion (includes $3 billion for transmission lines)
- Owner: Progress Energy Inc

Nuclear power station
- Reactor type: PWR
- Reactor supplier: Westinghouse

Power generation
- Units cancelled: 2 × 1117 MW AP1000

The Levy County Nuclear Power Plant was a proposed nuclear power plant in Levy County, Florida. Progress Energy Florida originally estimated that the reactors would cost $5 billion and would commence operation in 2016. It later became clear that the Levy County reactors would not have started operation until at least 2026. Since Progress filed its application for the new plant in 2008 demand for electricity had been growing very slowly, and natural gas prices were extremely low at the time. The utility estimated that the reactors would cost between $17 billion and $22 billion, not counting financing charges and cost overruns. According to economist Mark Cooper, opposition to the project has mounted, threatening a rerun of the 1970s and 1980s, when the majority of nuclear construction plans were canceled or abandoned.

On August 1, 2013, Duke Energy terminated the engineering, procurement, and construction (EPC) agreement for the Levy nuclear project, as part of a settlement with Florida's consumer advocates. On August 29, 2017, Duke Energy officially decided not to move forward with construction.

== History ==
The Levy County Nuclear Power Plant was the umbrella term for a proposed nuclear power plant in Levy County, Florida. In 2006, Progress Energy Florida (PEF) announced the selection of 5,100 acres (2,100 ha) in southern Levy County for the potential construction of new nuclear reactors. The site's proximity to the company's existing Crystal River 3 Nuclear Power Plant was expected to provide opportunities for efficiencies in shared support functions at both facilities. However, Progress Energy (at this point a subsidiary of Duke Energy) announced the decommissioning of the Crystal River reactor in February 2013 after cracks formed in its containment dome, estimated at $1.5 billion to repair. The company made no reference to constructing any new nuclear facilities in the region, only stating that it is "evaluating a number of potential sites for new plant capacity that may be needed in the future to meet Florida customer needs."

Progress Energy Florida submitted a filing with the Florida Public Service Commission (PSC) on March 11, 2008, outlining its need for additional electricity and proposing to meet that need with two nuclear units in Levy County. The PSC scheduled hearings on the project in late May, and approved it in July. The company then applied for a Combined Construction and Operating License (COL) from the Nuclear Regulatory Commission (NRC) on July 30, 2008. Costs of the power plant were estimated at $19–24 billion, including $3 billion for necessary transmission upgrades. The first reactor was expected to come online in 2024 and the second one 18 months later.

On October 14, 2008, the PSC voted to allow PEF to charge customers an additional $11.42 per 1,000 kW·h, beginning in January 2009, to pay for the Levy plant and work upgrading the Crystal River plant.

On January 5, 2009, PEF awarded an engineering, procurement, and construction (EPC) contract to Westinghouse and The Shaw Group's nuclear division to build the two reactors for $7.65 billion. The reactors were supposed to become operational between 2016 and 2018. In May, after the NRC denied permission to begin excavation work on the site to prepare for construction prior to issuing the COL, Progress Energy announced that commercial operation of the two new reactors had been pushed back "a minimum of 20 months." In view of the delay, Progress Energy has requested approval from the Public Service Commission to reduce the project cost to consumers in 2010 from $12.63 to $6.69 per 1000 kW·h.

On August 11, 2009, Florida governor Charlie Crist and his cabinet unanimously adopted the recommendation of the state Department of Environmental Protection, and approved the plant's Site Certification Application (SCA). Site certification is the last major state-level approval needed before Progress can start constructing the Levy plant. The approval included a requirement that Progress shut down coal-fired electrical generating units 1 & 2 at its nearby Crystal River Energy Complex by the end of 2020, assuming the timely licensing and construction of the Levy nuclear power plant.

On August 1, 2013, as part of a comprehensive settlement with a group representing Florida consumers Duke Energy announced termination of the engineering, procurement and construction (EPC) agreement for the Levy nuclear project and consideration of a natural gas-fueled alternative, but said it would continue to seek a combined construction and operating license (COL) for the project from the Nuclear Regulatory Commission (NRC). A final decision was to be made in the future based on "energy needs, project costs, carbon regulation, natural gas prices, existing or future legislative provisions for cost recovery, and the requirements of the NRC’s COL" and other factors. Research published in May 2013 by The Tampa Bay Times showed that a plant fueled by natural gas was nearly certain to be cheaper than a nuclear-fueled plant over the next 6 decades. About $1 billion had been spent on the preparatory work for the Levy nuclear project.

On October 20, 2016, the Nuclear Regulatory Commission cleared the way for the agencies Office of New Reactors to issue two (2) Combined Licenses (COLs) for the Levy County site. Based on the mandatory hearing on Duke’s application, the NRC found the staff’s review adequate to make the necessary regulatory safety and environmental findings. The licenses will authorize Duke Energy Florida to build and operate two AP1000 reactors at the site, near Inglis in Levy County. The staff will impose conditions on the license, including specific actions associated with the agency’s post-Fukushima requirements for mitigation strategies and spent fuel pool instrumentation; and a pre-startup schedule for implementing post-Fukushima aspects of the new reactors’ emergency preparedness plans and procedures.

In August 2017, Duke announced a settlement with the Florida Public Service Commission stating, "The company will also no longer move forward with building the Levy Nuclear Project and customers will not pay any further costs associated with the project."

== Reactor data ==
The Levy County Nuclear Power Plant was planned to consist of two reactors:

Reactor unit	Reactor type	Capacity		Construction started	Electricity grid connection	Commercial operation	Shutdown
Reactor unit	Reactor type	Net	Gross	Construction started	Electricity grid connection	Commercial operation	Shutdown
Levy County-1 (planned)	AP1000	1117 MW	MW				
Levy County-2 (planned)	AP1000	1117 MW	MW				
