= Blue Hills Nuclear Power Plant =

Canceled nuclear power plant proposal

Coordinates: 31°9′N 93°42′W

The Blue Hills Nuclear Power Plant was a proposed commercial nuclear power plant 20 miles northeast of Jasper, Texas. It was proposed in the 1970s by the Gulf States Utilities Company. One 918 MWe pressurized water reactor was ordered in 1973, and an additional 918 MWe reactor was ordered in 1974 from Combustion Engineering. The two unit power plant proposal was canceled in 1978.

== See also ==
- List of books about nuclear issues
- Nuclear power debate
- Nuclear power in the United States
- List of canceled nuclear plants in the United States
