= Bailly Nuclear Power Plant =

Project in Indiana, US, cancelled in 1981

Coordinates: 41.64513°N 87.116393°W

The Bailly Nuclear Power Plant was a nuclear power plant project to be located near the Indiana Dunes National Lakeshore in Porter County, Indiana, United States. The project was proposed by the Northern Indiana Public Service Company (NIPSCO) in 1967; however, it was cancelled in 1981.

It was to have capacity one 644 MW boiling water reactor and it was expected to cost $1.8 billion. Construction started on January 1, 1974.

Construction was opposed by the "Concerned Citizens Against the Bailly Nuclear Site", an interest group established in 1972, and the United Steelworkers of America District 31, and the Bailley Alliance. They opposed the project legally and also through the procedures of the United States Nuclear Regulatory Commission and other relevant government agencies. The group broke up in 1982 after cancellation of the project.

== See also ==
- Anti-nuclear movement in the United States
- List of books about nuclear issues
- Nuclear power in the United States
- Canceled nuclear plants in the United States
