= South River Nuclear Power Plant =

South River Nuclear Power Plant was proposed by Carolina Power & Light in 1973 as three Babcock & Wilcox 1,150 MW units, but the project was canceled in 1978.

The late 1960s and early 1970s saw a rapid growth in the development of nuclear power in the USA. By 1976, however, many nuclear plant proposals were no longer viable due to the downturn of electricity demand increases, significant cost and time overruns, and more complex regulatory requirements. Also, there was considerable public opposition to nuclear power in the US by this time, which contributed to delays in licensing planned nuclear power stations.

== See also ==
- List of books about nuclear issues
- Nuclear power debate
- Nuclear power in the United States
- List of canceled nuclear plants in the United States
