= Cherokee Nuclear Power Plant =

Unfinished nuclear power plant in South Carolina, US

Coordinates: 35.0365°N 81.5112°W

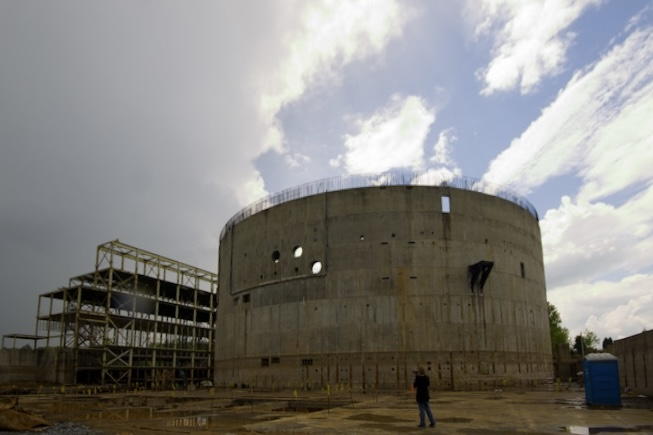
Abandoned unit 1 reactor building

The Cherokee Nuclear Power Plant is an incomplete energy project 10 miles (16 km) outside Gaffney, South Carolina, United States. In the early 1970s, Duke Power started constructing a three-reactor nuclear power plant at the site. However, the project stalled due to economic problems by the early 1980s, leading to the project's eventual abandonment. In 1987, the power plant was the site of an underwater film studio built by Hollywood director James Cameron, for the film The Abyss.

On December 13, 2007, Duke Energy filed an application with the U.S. Nuclear Regulatory Commission to construct a new $5–6 billion two-unit nuclear power plant at William States Lee III Nuclear Generating Station near the Cherokee Nuclear Power Plant site. In November 2008, the estimated cost to complete the project was raised to $11 billion (equivalent to $16.1 billion in 2024).

== Original plant ==
Duke originally planned three reactors on the property. One reactor was partially completed when work was halted in 1982, and plans were scrapped for the other two. Duke halted construction at the site in 1983 after spending $633 million (equivalent to $2 billion in 2024). An uncertain economy, stringent federal regulations on nuclear plants, and a decrease in electrical use caused Duke Power to abandon the site in the early 1980s.

The Nuclear Steam Supply System (NSSS) for each unit was planned to be a pressurized water reactor manufactured by Combustion Engineering, Inc. The reactor fuel was planned to be zircaloy clad uranium dioxide with a maximum enrichment of 3.6 wt. percent. The NSSS would have had a guaranteed main steam flow of 17,185,000 pounds (7,795,000 kg) /hr., a warranted output of 3817 MWt, and a design point of 4018 MWt. The turbine generators were planned to be manufactured by General Electric. Each was planned to have a gross rated electrical output of 1,345 MW and a gross valves-wide-open (VWO) electrical output of 1,387 MW.

By 1988, Earl Owensby, a Shelby, North Carolina, businessman, had converted the former energy complex into a movie studio.

== The Abyss ==
In 1987, director James Cameron debated whether to actually film in the ocean or on a film set during the process of writing his screenplay for The Abyss. He ultimately chose to film in a man-made environment due to the need to control dangers, cost and filming environment.

Cameron decided to use Cherokee Nuclear Power plant facility to film the underwater sequences involving the submerged drilling rig.

=== Filming ===
The turbine pit, which was a large irregularly-shaped structure, was modified to hold 2.2 million US gallons (8,300 m^{3}) of water. But when cinematographer Al Giddings visited the site he found the potential tank was still not quite large enough for the production's needs. Cameron then investigated the original containment vessel for the reactor chamber, a cylindrical structure 200 feet (61 m) across, 55 feet (17 m) deep. Following modifications, this vessel was converted into a vat able to hold 7.5 million US gallons (28,000 m^{3}) of water. This containment vessel became "A" tank while the smaller turbine pit was the "B" tank.

"B" tank was used for all the interiors of the submarine, the Sub Bay set and for the "wet-for-wet" miniature work. The "A" tank was used for the main exterior of Deepcore and for the full-sized exterior Montana missile deck section. The water depth and length of time spent submerged meant that the cast and crew had to endure decompression treatments.

Interior sets for Deepcore and other production sets were built inside the nearby warehouses on the site.

=== Location ===
In December 1988, production moved to Los Angeles. After the completion of filming the tanks were drained but the sets were not removed.

Before abandoning the set, warning labels were affixed on the structures stating that the sets remained the property of 20th Century Fox and that any photographic or video recording was not allowed.

The Abyss sets were demolished in September 2007.

== New nuclear power plant ==
On December 13, 2007, Duke Power announced that this site had been selected for a new nuclear power plant to be called the William States Lee III Nuclear Generating Station. The site is owned by Duke Energy. Duke planned to develop the site for two Westinghouse Electric Company AP1000 (advanced passive) pressurized water reactors.

Each reactor would have been capable of producing approximately 1,117 megawatts. Plant construction on the 2,022-acre (8.18 km^{2}) site could take five years. The property still has cooling ponds and infrastructure in place, making it more attractive than other sites in the region. The property is close to the Broad River, and electricity transmission lines are accessible. This new plant will be built adjacent to the old site. The prior construction at the old site was largely demolished to make way for the new construction.

== See also ==
- The Abyss
- List of canceled nuclear plants in the United States
