= William States Lee III Nuclear Generating Station =

- Country: United States
- Location: Cherokee County, near Gaffney, South Carolina
- Coordinates: 35°2′0″N 81°30′40″W
- Status: Cancelled
- Construction cost: $11 billion (estimate)
- Owner: Duke Energy

Nuclear power station
- Reactor type: AP1000
- Reactor supplier: Westinghouse

Power generation
- Units planned: 2 × 1117 MW

The William States Lee III Nuclear Station was a planned two-unit nuclear power plant in Cherokee County, South Carolina. Duke Energy filed the Combined Construction and Operating License (COL) application for the plant on December 13, 2007 to the NRC. On December 19, 2016, the NRC issued two Combined Licenses authorizing Duke to build and operate two AP1000 reactors at the site.

In August 2017, Duke decided to seek permission from the North Carolina Utility Commission to cancel the project due to the bankruptcy of Westinghouse and "other market activity", although they will retain the option of restarting the project at some point in the future if circumstances change.

The plant was named for William States Lee III (1929–1996), former chief executive officer (CEO) of Duke Energy (1982–94). This site would have been be adjacent to the Cherokee Nuclear Power Plant site, which was also never completed and abandoned in the early 1980s, then later used by James Cameron as a film set for the 1989 movie The Abyss.

== Costs and economics ==
In December 2007, Duke Power announced that it would spend $160 million in 2008 on the plant and that total costs could range 5–6 billion dollars. In November 2008, Duke estimated the overnight cost of the plant at $11 billion.

== Licensing and construction ==
Duke submitted the Lee application to the NRC on Dec. 12, 2007. The NRC's Advisory Committee on Reactor Safeguards independently reviewed aspects of the application that concern safety, as well as the staff's final safety evaluation report. The committee provided the results of its review to the Commission on Dec. 14, 2015. The NRC completed its environmental review and issued the final impact statement for the proposed William States Lee reactors in December 2013.

The Commission authorized the agency's Office of New Reactors to issue the licenses, having found the staff's review of Duke's application adequate to make the necessary regulatory safety and environmental findings. The licenses were issued Dec. 19. The licenses contain conditions, including:

- Specific actions associated with the agency's post-Fukushima requirements for Mitigation Strategies and Spent Fuel Pool Instrumentation
- A pre-startup schedule for post-Fukushima aspects of the new reactor's emergency preparedness plans and procedures.

== Reactor data ==
The William States Lee III Nuclear Generating Station was planned to consist of two AP1000 reactors.

Reactor unit	Reactor type	Capacity		Construction started	Electricity grid connection	Commercial operation	Shutdown
Reactor unit	Reactor type	Net	Gross	Construction started	Electricity grid connection	Commercial operation	Shutdown
William States Lee III -1 (planned)	AP1000	1117 MW	MW				
William States Lee III -2 (planned)	AP1000	1117 MW	MW				

== See also ==
- Nuclear Power 2010 Program
