= Carrie Barefoot Dickerson =

American activist (1917–2006)

- Born: May 24, 1917; Okmulgee, Oklahoma, U.S.
- Died: November 17, 2006 (aged 89); Claremore, Oklahoma, U.S.
- Education: Oklahoma State University (BS, MS)
- Occupation: Activist
- Known for: Leading citizen efforts to stop construction of the proposed Black Fox Nuclear Power Plant
- Spouse: Charles Robert Dickerson (m. 1938; died 1981)
- Children: 4

Carrie Barefoot Dickerson (May 24, 1917 – November 17, 2006) was an American activist who led citizen efforts to stop construction of the proposed Black Fox Nuclear Power Plant in Oklahoma.

== Life ==
Dickerson was born in Okmulgee, Oklahoma, in 1917 to a pioneering family. She attended the Rocky Hill and Nuyaka Mission schools. At Oklahoma State University she studied home economics education and nutrition, earning BS and MS degrees. She married Cherokee dairy farm (and fellow OSU graduate) Charles Robert Dickerson in 1938. They established a farm east of Claremore, Oklahoma. The couple had four children.

In 1943, Dickerson began teaching at the German-speaking Mennonite Pleasant View community school near Inola, Oklahoma. She later taught in several area schools before retiring in 1957. She then opened a home-based bakery. In 1964 she and her husband opened Aunt Carrie's Nursing Home (later called Wood Manor) in Claremore.

After her husband died in early 1981, Dickerson operated a health food store in Claremore. She closed the store in 2002.

Carrie Dickerson died at Claremore in 2006.

== Opposition to nuclear power plant ==
In 1973 the Public Service Company of Oklahoma (PSO) announced plans to build the Black Fox nuclear power plant near Inola. When Dickerson read the news, she began researching the health and environmental risks that could be posed by the power plant. Her findings were largely based on environmental damage caused by effluent from the World War II-era Manhattan Project. She and another activist, Ilene Younghein, of nearby Oklahoma City, formed CASE (Citizens' Action for Safe Energy), to educate the public about the potential dangers.

Following Dickerson's lead, other anti-nuclear organizations were formed in the area, and citizens from all walks of life and ethnic groups joined in the battle. Finally, on February 16, 1982, PSO announced the cancellation of the proposed project.

== Legacy ==
The Carrie Dickerson Lifetime Achievement Award, presented by the Oklahoma Sustainability Network, is named in her honor.

She wrote the autobiography "Aunt Carrie's War Against the Black Fox Nuclear Power Plant", which was published in 1995.

== See also ==
- Anti-nuclear movement in the United States
- Anti-nuclear protests in the United States
