= Mosel (community), Wisconsin =

Mosel, Wisconsin
- Unincorporated community
- Location within Wisconsin Location within the United States
- Coordinates: 43°48′20″N 87°44′25″W
- Country: United States
- State: Wisconsin
- County: Sheboygan
- Elevation: 643 ft (196 m)
- Time zone: UTC-6 (Central (CST))
  - Summer (DST): UTC-5 (CDT)
- Area code: 920
- GNIS feature ID: 1569766

Mosel is an unincorporated community in the town of Mosel, Sheboygan County, Wisconsin, United States.

== History ==
A post office called Mosel was established in 1869, and remained in operation until it was discontinued in 1903. The community was named after the Moselle river (German: Mosel) in Europe. The township was originally spelled Moselle, and the same may be true of the community.
