= Haven, Wisconsin =

Haven
- Unincorporated community
- Location within the state of Wisconsin
- Coordinates: 43°50′54″N 87°45′12″W
- Country: United States
- State: Wisconsin
- County: Sheboygan
- Time zone: UTC-6 (Central (CST))
  - Summer (DST): UTC-5 (CDT)
- ZIP codes: 53030
- Area code: 920

Haven is an unincorporated community in the town of Mosel in Sheboygan County, Wisconsin, United States. The community is located east of I-43 between Sheboygan, Wisconsin and Cleveland, Wisconsin.

== History ==
A military camp called Camp Haven was named after the community. It was located in Haven on 160 acres (0.65 km^{2}) of rented land. The camp operated from 1949 until November 16, 1959. as an anti-aircraft testing range. The land was sold to Wisconsin Power and Light for a planned nuclear power plant called Haven Nuclear Power Plant. After plans never materialized, the Whistling Straits golf resort was built on the site, which hosted the Ryder Cup in 2021.
