= Haven Nuclear Power Plant =

Cancelled nuclear power project in Wisconsin

Coordinates: 43.851°N 87.735°W

Map of Wisconsin showing Sheboygan County

The Haven Nuclear Power Plant was a proposed nuclear power plant in Haven, Wisconsin north of Sheboygan at the site of closed military camp called Camp Haven. The power plant was proposed in the 1970s by Wisconsin Electric, but was never built. Two 900 MWe Westinghouse pressurized water reactor were proposed in 1973. Reactor one was canceled in 1978 and reactor two was canceled in 1980. After plans never materialized, the Kohler Company purchased the site. Construction of the Whistling Straits golf course began in 1995.

== See also ==
- List of books about nuclear issues
- Nuclear power debate
- Nuclear power in the United States
- List of canceled nuclear plants in the United States
