= Forked River Nuclear Power Plant =

Proposed nuclear power plant in New Jersey

Coordinates: 39.813°N 74.218°W

The Forked River Nuclear Power Plant was a proposed nuclear power plant in Lacey Township in Ocean County, New Jersey. It was proposed as a single 1,070 MW reactor in 1969 to be built by Combustion Engineering and operated by Jersey Central Power and Light. The facility would have been located on a site between JCP&L's existing Oyster Creek Nuclear Generating Station and the Garden State Parkway. Unlike the Oyster Creek Plant, the Forked River Plant would have a cooling tower to prevent the release of hot water into Oyster Creek and Barnegat Bay.

The company General Public Utilities (GPU) used the crane K-10000, the greatest crane in the world, produced by Krøll Cranes A/S at the constructing this plant.

Construction of the plant was halted in 1974 due to financial cut-backs and environmental protests, but was resumed in 1976. The plant's construction was ultimately canceled in 1980, when General Public Utilities (the parent company of JCP&L) halted construction "because of financial difficulties stemming from the accident at its Three Mile Island facility", as well as uncertainty over whether the NRC would grant a license or possibly institute other costly regulations. In addition, community fears and a construction accident that killed one worker helped end the plant's construction.

== See also ==
- Oyster Creek Nuclear Generating Station
