= Douglas Point Nuclear Power Plant =

Coordinates: 38°26′36″N 77°15′30″W

The Douglas Point Nuclear Power Plant was proposed in 1973 for a site on the Potomac River to the south of Washington, D.C. by the Potomac Electric Power Company (PEPCO). The proposed generating facility was to be located in Charles County, Maryland, about 30 miles (48 km) south of Washington, D.C. Two boiling water reactors of about 1150 megawatts were proposed, with projected in-service dates of 1981 and 1982. Two 450-foot (140 m) cooling towers were proposed, and water consumption was projected at 108,000 US gallons per minute (410,000 L/min). The project was set aside in the late 1970s. Opposition centered on the plant's effects on striped bass spawning grounds in the Potomac and consequent damage to the striped bass fishery in the Chesapeake Bay.

The 1,270-acre (510 ha) site was purchased by the state of Maryland and the Bureau of Land Management and is operated as the Douglas Point State National Resources Management Area, part of the Maryland Department of Natural Resources' Nanjemoy Wildlife Management Area.
