= Black Fox Nuclear Power Plant =

Unfinished nuclear power plant in Oklahoma

Coordinates: 36.11576°N 95.55157°W

The Black Fox Nuclear Power Plant was a nuclear power plant proposed by the Public Service Company of Oklahoma (PSO) in May 1973. It was cancelled in 1982. The unfinished site is located about three miles southwest of downtown Inola.

== History ==
The facility was to be built approximately 3 miles southwest of downtown Inola, Oklahoma, but still within town limits, and was to consist of two 1,150 MWe General Electric (GE) Boiling Water Reactors. The estimated cost of construction in 1973 was $450 million. By 1979, the amount had grown to $3.4 billion.

On June 2, 1979, just two months after the partial meltdown at the Three Mile Island nuclear power plant in Pennsylvania, a group of people climbed over the barbed wire fence that surrounded the Black Fox Power Plant. Protesters carried their backpacks, tents and acoustic guitars in an attempt to disrupt construction and camp out overnight. About 500 people were arrested for protesting.

On February 16, 1982, Public Service Company of Oklahoma canceled the Black Fox project. After nine years of court and legal challenges by Carrie Barefoot Dickerson and the Citizen's Action for Safe Energy (CASE) group, and $555,000, they would win against PSO.

On March 13, 2017 the Inola City Council unanimously voted to rezone the property owned by AEP/PSO from AG agricultural to I-4 Heavy Industrial. Since then, AEP/PSO has presented 1,000 acres of the former plant for development. On March 16, 2018, Sofidel America, a paper manufacturing company with global headquarters in Italy, held a groundbreaking ceremony for their new 1.8-million-square-foot plant with a $360-million capital investment. The Sofidel project involves 500 construction jobs and 300 permanent jobs. The new plant will cover 50 acres under one roof. Sofidel bought 240 acres from PSO, which still has 750 acres around it for sale. PSO sold the land for just over $1 million ($4166.66 an acre).

== See also ==
- Anti-nuclear movement in the United States
- Anti-nuclear protests in the United States
- List of canceled nuclear plants in the United States

== Other information ==
- American Electric Power Purchases Public Service Company of Oklahoma
