= Greene County Nuclear Power Plant =

Cancelled nuclear power plant in New York State, USA

Coordinates: 42°09′00″N 73°54′41″W

The Greene County Nuclear Power Plant was proposed in 1974 by the Power Authority of the State of New York. A single 1,212 MWe Babcock & Wilcox pressurized water reactor was to be built approximately 5 miles south of Catskill, New York on the western shore of the Hudson River, but the plant proposal was canceled in 1979, largely due to concerns over social and economic disruptions to the local communities.

== See also ==
- List of books about nuclear issues
- Nuclear power debate
- Nuclear power in the United States
- Somerset Power Plant
