= Crystal River Energy Complex =

Power plant in Florida, US

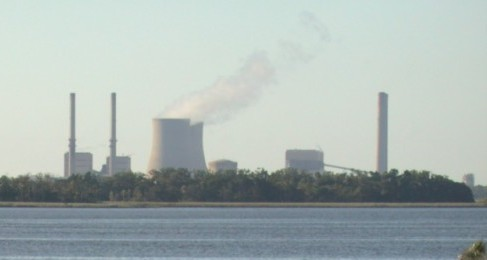
- The entire complex
- Country: United States
- Location: Crystal River, Florida
- Coordinates: 28.958111°N 82.699722°W
- Status: Operational
- Construction began: Unit 3: September 25, 1968
- Commission date: Unit 1: 1966; Unit 2: 1969; Unit 3: March 13, 1977; Unit 4: 1982; Unit 5: 1984
- Decommission date: Unit 3: February 5, 2013
- Construction cost: Unit 3: $400 million
- Owner: Duke Energy
- Operator: Duke Energy

Thermal power station
- Primary fuel: Coal
- Secondary fuel: Fuel oil
- Cooling source: Crystal River, Air cooling

Power generation
- Units operational: 2 × 717 MW
- Units cancelled: 1 × 897 MW
- Units decommissioned: 1 × 860 MW; 1 × 373 MW; 1 × 469 MW
- Nameplate capacity: 1,434 MW
- Capacity factor: 44.57%
- Annual net output: 8886 GW·h (2016)

The Crystal River Energy Complex consists of seven power-generating plants on a 4,700-acre (1,900 ha) site near the mouth of the Crystal River in Citrus County, Florida. Crystal River 1, 2, 4, and 5 are fossil fuel power plants. Crystal River 3 was previously the sole nuclear power plant on the site (1977-2013). The Crystal River Combined Cycle site consists of two Mitsubishi gas turbines, which came on-line in 2018. The complex was developed in the early 1960s by the Florida Power Corporation and sold to Progress Energy Inc in 2000. Following Progress Energy's merger with Duke Energy in 2012, the facility is owned and operated by Duke Energy.

In February 2013, Duke Energy announced that Crystal River 3 would be permanently shut down.

== Power plants ==
Unit	Unit type	Capacity		Construction started	Electricity grid connection	Commercial operation	Shutdown
Unit	Unit type	Net	Gross	Construction started	Electricity grid connection	Commercial operation	Shutdown
Unit 1	Coal, water-cooled	373 MW	441 MW	October 1966			2019
Unit 2	Coal, water-cooled	469 MW	524 MW	November 1969			2019
Unit 3	Nuclear	860 MW	890 MW	September 25, 1968	January 30, 1977	March 13, 1977	February 5, 2013
Unit 4	Coal, air and water-cooled	717 MW	739 MW	December 1982			
Unit 5	Coal, air and water-cooled	717 MW	739 MW	October 1984			

== See also ==
- Levy County Nuclear Power Plant
- Progress Energy Inc
- List of power stations in Florida
