= Victoria County Station =

Proposed nuclear plant in Texas

Coordinates: 28°36′52″N 97°1′50″W

The Victoria County Station was a proposed nuclear power plant, in Victoria County, 13.3 miles south of Victoria, Texas. Permission for the plant, which would have consisted of two 1535 MWe GE Vernova Hitachi economic simplified boiling water reactors, was applied for by the Exelon Nuclear Texas Holdings, LLC on September 2, 2008. The project was canceled in August 2012.

Exelon filed a Combined Construction and Operating License (COL) application for the plant on September 3, 2008 with the Nuclear Regulatory Commission. In July 2009, Exelon announced that it was suspending its COL application. In March 2010, Exelon announced that it was formally withdrawing its COL application, while submitting its application for an early site permit (ESP).

On August 28, 2012, Exelon announced that it had notified the Nuclear Regulatory Commission that it was withdrawing its ESP application, which brought to an end all project activity.

== See also ==
- Nuclear Power 2010 Program
