= Alan R. Barton Plant =

Proposed nuclear power plant in the U.S.

Coordinates: 32°45′N 86°24′W

The Alan R. Barton Nuclear Plant was a proposed commercial nuclear power plant in central Alabama, United States.

== Proposed plant ==
Alabama Power Company proposed constructing four 1,159 MWe General Electric Boiling Water Reactors at the site approximately 15 miles southeast of Clanton, Alabama.

The proposed plant was named after Alabama Power Company Senior Vice President Alan R. Barton.

The proposed plant was identified by the acronym ABNP in Nuclear Regulatory Commission correspondence.

== 1970s cancellation ==
Barton 3 & 4 were canceled in 1975 while under 10CFR50 Construction Permit (CP) review. Two years later, Barton 1 & 2 were canceled during the CP review process as well.

== Reactor data ==
The nuclear power plant was to have had four units:

| Unit | Reactor type | Net capacity | Gross- capacity | Planned | Canceled |
|---|---|---|---|---|---|
| Barton-1 | General Electric Boiling Water Reactor (BWR/6) | 1.209 MW | 1.254 MW | 1972 | 01.11.1977 |
| Barton-2 | General Electric Boiling Water Reactor (BWR/6) | 1.209 MW | 1.254 MW | 1972 | 01.11.1977 |
| Barton-3 | General Electric Boiling Water Reactor (BWR/6) | 1.209 MW | 1.254 MW | 1974 | 01.11.1975 |
| Barton-4 | General Electric Boiling Water Reactor (BWR/6) | 1.209 MW | 1.254 MW | 1974 | 01.11.1975 |
