= Atlantic Nuclear Power Plant =

Floating nuclear power plant

Coordinates: 39.5726°N 74.19513°W

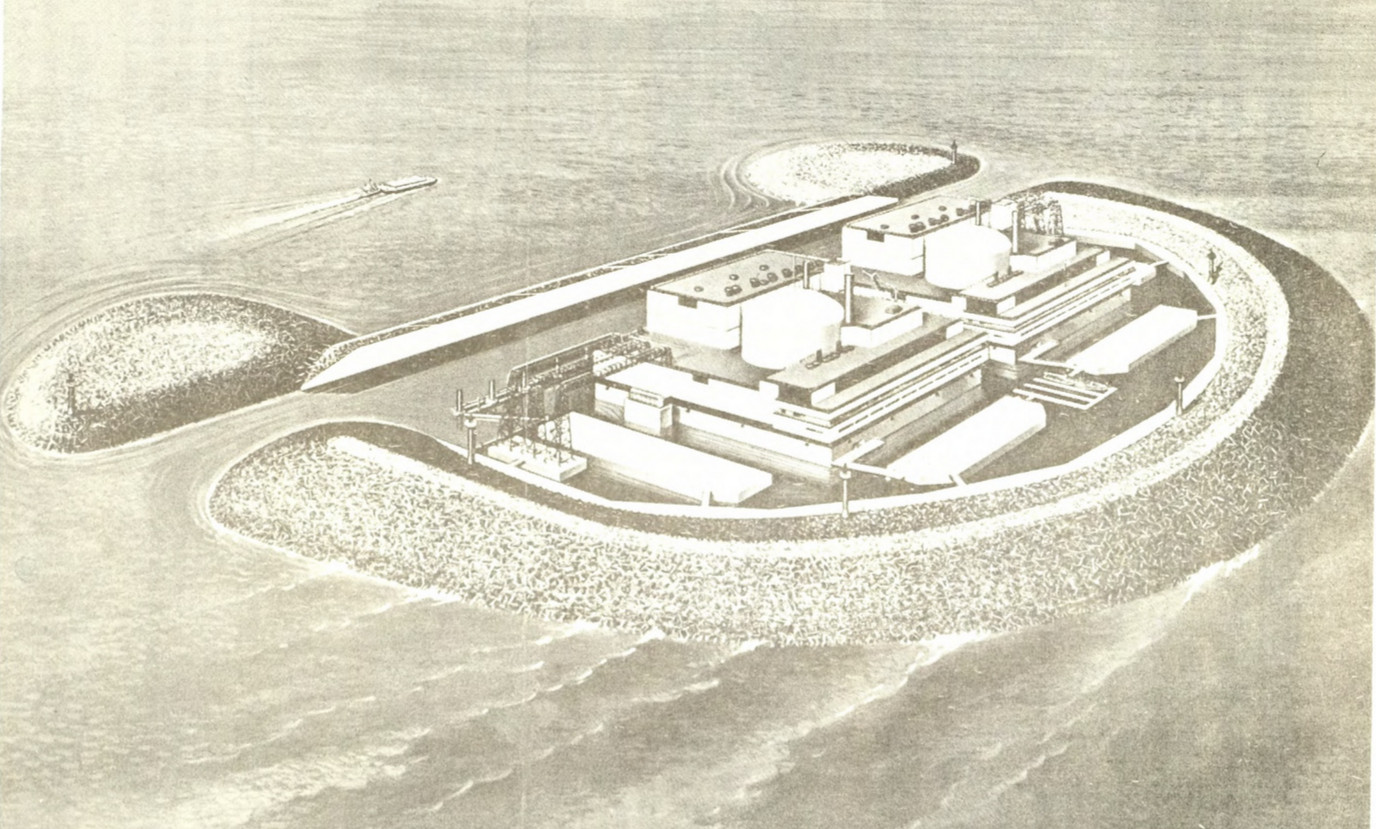
An artist's concept of two Offshore Power Systems floating nuclear reactors

The Atlantic Nuclear Power Plant was a proposed floating nuclear facility planned off the coast of New Jersey. Public Service Electric and Gas Company (PSE&G) proposed the project in the 1970s with developer Offshore Power Systems. It included four Westinghouse 1,150 MWe (net) pressurized water reactors, with two reactors ordered in 1972 and two more in 1973. The project was canceled in 1978.

== Location ==
The plant was to be located approximately 1.8 miles (2.9 km) offshore near Little Egg Harbor and Great Bay, about 11 miles (18 km) northeast of Atlantic City. The design called for the reactors to be built on man-made islands protected by concrete breakwaters. These structures would have been constructed on Blount Island near Jacksonville, Florida, and transported to the site by ship. The idea originated in 1969 with a PSE&G engineer. Although initial plans targeted operation in the mid-1980s, rising costs and environmental opposition led to the cancellation of the project in 1978.

== Design and engineering ==
The plant was planned to consist of two separate, identical nuclear power plants mounted side-by-side on large rectangular barge structures. The site would have been protected by a breakwater, described as the largest and strongest ever proposed for ocean use. The breakwater was to be built from concrete caissons, sand, and gravel, and topped with approximately 70,000 interlocking pre-cast concrete units called dolosse, each weighing up to 42 tons and measuring 20 by 20 feet (6.1 by 6.1 m). It was designed to withstand ocean conditions including 43 feet (13 m) waves, sustained hurricane winds of 156 miles per hour (251 km/h), and tornado winds of up to 300 miles per hour (480 km/h).

Each plant barge would measure about 400 feet (120 m) per side, with a draft of approximately 30 feet (9.1 m). The breakwater design would allow an additional 10 feet (3.0 m) of clearance for water to flow beneath the structures. The reactors planned for the site were 1,150 MWe four-loop pressurized water reactors (PWRs) manufactured by Westinghouse.

== Construction and logistics ==
The nuclear power plants were to be built at a specialized facility in Jacksonville, Florida, operated by Offshore Power Systems, a joint venture between Westinghouse and Tenneco. The project planned to use modular construction and assembly-line manufacturing techniques to standardize designs, aiming to lower costs and shorten planning times, similar to modern modular reactor concepts.

Electricity generated offshore would have been transmitted to the mainland through heavy underwater cables, avoiding the need for high-tension transmission towers. A shore base would support operations by providing worker transport, maintenance supplies, and other logistical services.

== See also ==
- Floating nuclear power station
