= Marble Hill Nuclear Power Plant =

Unfinished power plant in Indiana, US

Coordinates: 38°36′03.09″N 85°26′45.19″W

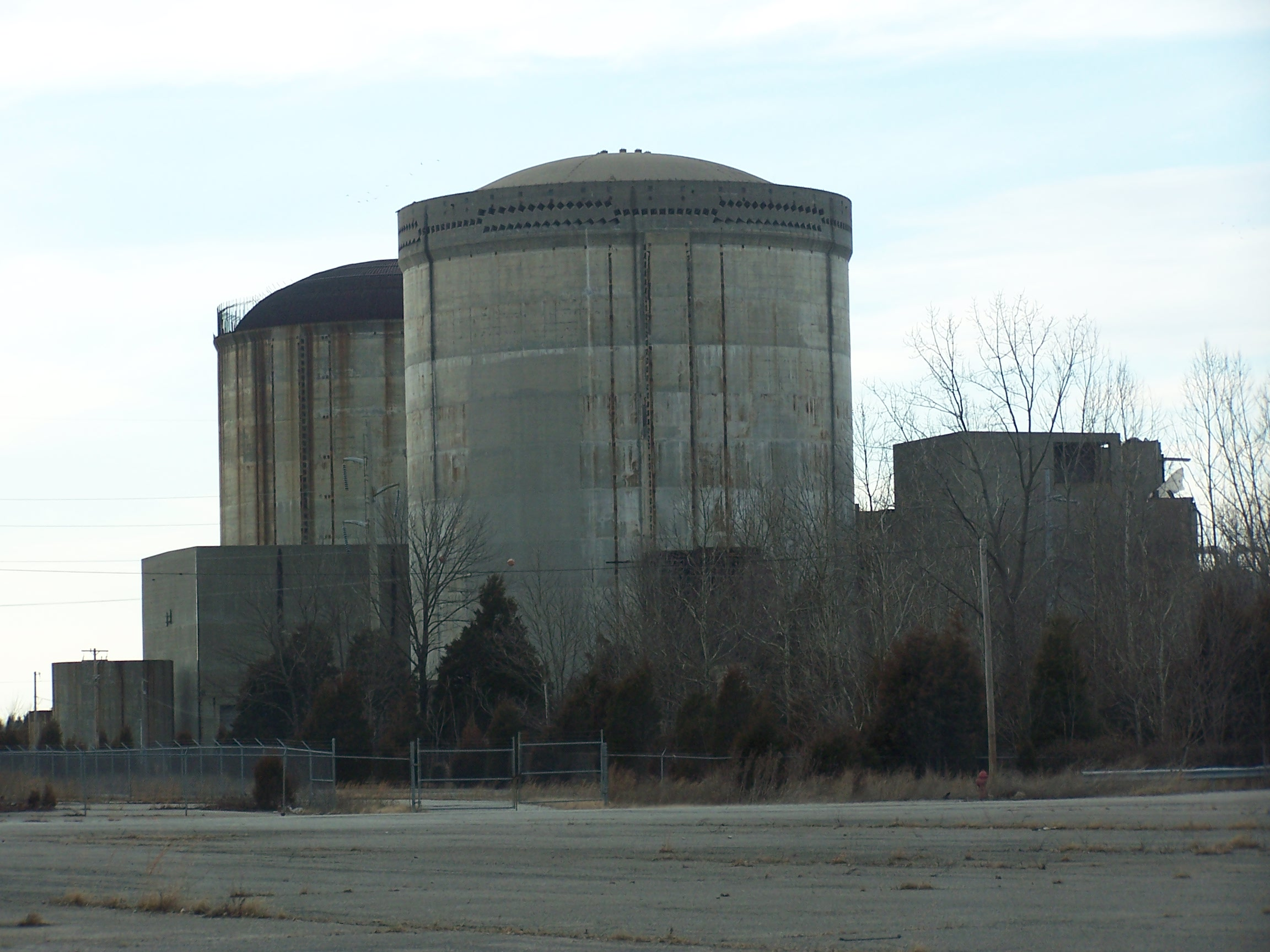
A 2007 view of the reactor complex. Notice that the turbine building behind the containment buildings has been demolished.

Marble Hill Nuclear Power Station was an unfinished nuclear power plant in Saluda Township, Jefferson County, near Hanover, Indiana, USA. In 1983, the Public Service Company of Indiana announced it was abandoning the half-finished nuclear power plant, on which $2.5 billion had already been spent.

== History ==
Construction at Marble Hill began in 1977 and ended in 1984, when the Public Service Company of Indiana (PSI), now Duke Energy, abandoned the half-finished nuclear power plant. With $2.5 billion spent and, as the most expensive nuclear construction project ever abandoned, Marble Hill was a devastating setback for the troubled nuclear power industry, which saw more than 100 plant cancellations following the Three Mile Island accident near Harrisburg, Pennsylvania, in March 1979. On March 18, 2005, demolition of the unfinished facility began.
Long before 1984, Marble Hill had been a controversial enterprise. During 1978 and 1979, regional Ohio Valley environmental advocacy group The Paddlewheel Alliance staged two non-violent "occupations" of the PSI property. As ongoing local support dwindled, Marble Hill's fate rested with Indiana's state government, and PSI sought state funding guarantees for Construction Work in Progress (CWIP).

Eventually, PSI announced it had to abandon Marble Hill because of an overwhelming increase in costs and a shortage of funds to finish construction. In October 1985, PSI staged an auction for roughly $8 million worth of already purchased reactor hardware.

== Transmission lines ==
PSI planned to connect the nuclear plant to its network via a pair of 765 kV power lines and by looping in an existing, nearby 345 kV power line. The original plan included a 765 kV line to the existing Columbus substation, just south of Columbus, Indiana, and another 765 kV line to be built to a new substation near Rushville. However, plans for the Marble-Hill-to-Rush 765 kV power line were replaced with plans for a 765 kV link to American Electric Power's Jefferson Station, near Madison (and Clifty Creek Power Plant). Presumably, they would benefit PSI since the AEP Jefferson-Dumont 765 kV power line included an intermediate PSI interconnection substation near Greentown, Indiana.

Transmission line construction began before the plant was completed, but was halted before wires could be strung. For many years, the guyed-V 765 towers stood without wire, until they were purchased by AEP to replace structures on the Jefferson-Dumont line that were destroyed by cascading line failure from an ice storm in the early 1990s.

== Description ==
The two signature containment buildings which would have housed two 1130 MWe Westinghouse pressurized water reactors and the two cooling tower complexes were located just north of the containment buildings. (See photo.) The station was a near architectural one-for-one with Byron and Braidwood stations. The lower portion of the reactor vessel in Unit #1 was already installed at the time construction was halted. The turbine building behind the containment buildings has been demolished, although the multi-story concrete turbine foundations still stand, with what remains of the Unit #1 turbine still in place. During 1990, Power Equipment Supply Co. ("PESCO") was incorporated in Indiana and was established to sell equipment and parts from the Marble Hill Facility project. ESCO also purchased equipment for resale, brokered equipment, and sold equipment on consignment for others. Public Service Indiana discontinued PESCO operations in early 1996.

== Current status ==
Marble Hill is currently owned by an undisclosed Michigan-based company and under demolition with a contract from MCM Management Corp. Since 2008, the facility was undergoing continued demolition, in which the Fuel Handling building (the smaller square building between the two containment buildings) was slowly being torn away and scrapped. In August 2010, one of the containment buildings was completely demolished, and the other had its reactor core removed, and was under heavy demolition. By May 2011, most Marble Hill structures were either demolished, or under demolition. As of December 2011, both containment domes had been demolished, with approximately 2/3 of the cooling stacks standing. The control building was also under heavy demolition.
