= Bellefonte Nuclear Plant =

Unfinished nuclear power plant located in Hollywood, Alabama

Bellefonte Nuclear Generating Station
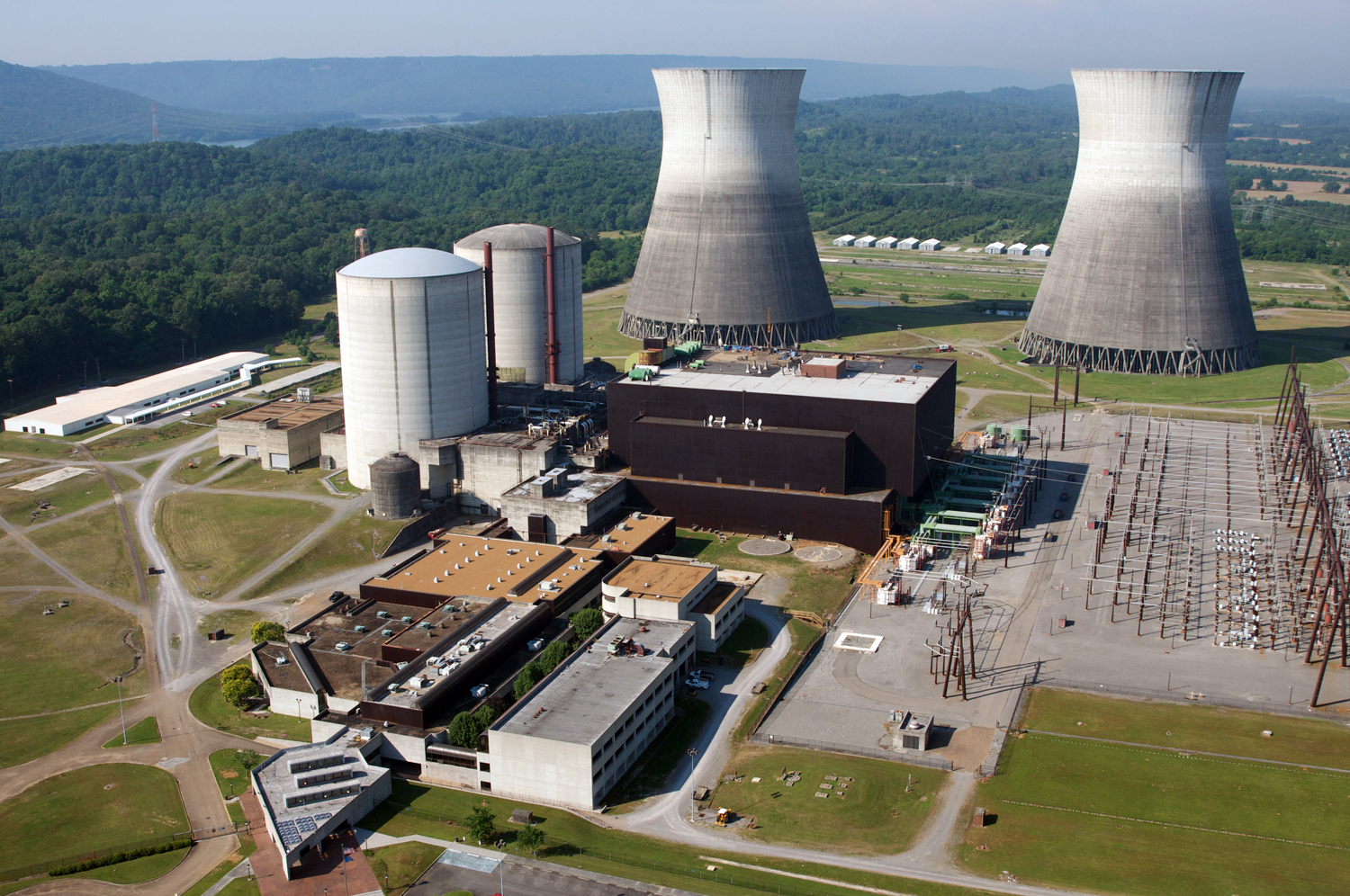
- Country: United States
- Location: Hollywood, Alabama
- Coordinates: 34°42′31″N 85°55′45″W
- Status: Suspended for 38 years, 10 months
- Construction began: 1975
- Construction cost: US$6 billion (Units 1 & 2)
- Owner: Tennessee Valley Authority

Nuclear power station
- Reactor type: PWR
- Reactor supplier: Babcock & Wilcox

Power generation
- Units cancelled: 2 × 1,100 MW
- Units under const.: 2 × 1,235 MW

External links
- Commons: Related media on Commons

The Bellefonte Nuclear Generating Station (BLN) is an unfinished nuclear power plant in Hollywood, Alabama, United States.

== History ==
A total of four nuclear reactors (two originally; and two of new designs), have been proposed for the site over a 40-year period, with over $4 billion having been spent (constructing the preliminary plant infrastructure and ordering/delivering/installing major equipment items). But no nuclear reactor nor electric generating plant was ever completed. Two cores of nuclear fuel were originally delivered; however these were returned on plant deferral. Meaningful construction progress at the site was halted in 1988. Starting after its termination in 2005, Tennessee Valley Authority (TVA) implemented an investment recovery effort to recoup some of the costs associated with Bellefonte. As part of the investment recovery effort, all or parts of some major plant components, including steam generators, feedwater heaters, large pumps and motors, demineralized water and condensate storage tanks, main condenser tubes, and some piping and valves were removed and sold. Additionally, some usable components were transferred from Bellefonte to other TVA facilities as spares.

=== Units 1 and 2 ===
The Bellefonte Nuclear Generating Station site is owned by the Tennessee Valley Authority and is located in Hollywood, Alabama. The two partially built 1,256 megawatt (MWe) pressurized water reactors on the site were made by Babcock & Wilcox; they are called a 205 design due to the number of fuel assemblies in the core. These units are of the same design as WNP-1, which is also unfinished, and as the Mülheim-Kärlich A reactor in Germany, which operated for three years and proved the design.

Reactor Unit 1 construction was estimated at 88% complete (mechanical - nuclear island) and Unit 2 construction was estimated 58% complete (mechanical - nuclear island) when TVA's Board suspended the project and the plants' construction in 1988, after a combined $6 billion investment. Subsequent asset recovery activities (i.e., the removal (without ordering or planning for replacement), of usable equipment and systems to other TVA power plant sites), along with more recent (2000s) inspections of the operable state of remaining equipment, resulted in BLN 1&2 now being considered approximately 55 percent and 35 percent complete (mechanical - nuclear island only) respectively.

Although the construction permits were terminated on September 15, 2006, TVA investigated the completion of these first two units with operation projected to start Unit 1 in 2017 and Unit 2 in 2021. In August 2008 TVA asked the NRC to reinstate the construction permits as part of the restart evaluation. This request was granted by the NRC on February 9, 2009, albeit as a terminated application, which required significant inspection of all systems to bring the license to the deferred stage. The status was upgraded January 14, 2010 to "deferred".

=== Units 3 and 4 ===
On September 22, 2005, it was announced that Bellefonte was also selected as the site for one or two AP1000 pressurized water reactors to be called Units 3 and 4. TVA filed the necessary applications in November 2007 to begin the design and construction process. For details, see Nuclear Power 2010 Program.

In August 2009, the Tennessee Valley Authority, faced with "falling electric sales and rising costs from cleaning up a massive coal ash spill in Tennessee", trimmed plans for the potential four-unit Bellefonte nuclear plant to one reactor.

=== Later developments ===
On August 20, 2010, the TVA Board of Directors authorized $248 million to continue development of the Bellefonte Unit 1. On August 18, 2011, the TVA board of directors voted to proceed with the construction of the unit one reactor at Bellefonte. In 2011, TVA approved a plan to restart construction of the Bellefonte Unit 1 reactor, dependent on work at another reactor TVA completing - Watts Bar 2 in Tennessee. In December 2012, TVA said the Watts Bar 2 project was on schedule to finish in December 2015. TVA again announced staffing cuts at the plant in June 2013, reducing staffing at the plant from 540 to approximately 140. During this time new Steam Generators were purchased and fabricated. Those generators are now stored onsite pending any new construction.

In October 2013, it was announced that former TVA Chairman Dennis Bottorff and financier Franklin L. Haney had drafted a proposal to finish the Bellefonte Nuclear Plant using private funds and federal tax credits

=== Sale of site ===
In 2015 TVA determined that it would be unlikely to need a large plant such as Bellefonte for the next 20 years, and in May 2016 elected to declare the plant surplus, and sell the 1,600-acre site at auction for a minimum price of $36.4 million.

On October 14, 2016, TVA directors declared the unfinished nuclear plant to be surplus property and set a November 14, 2016, auction date to sell the unfinished plant and property. Nuclear Development LLC, led by Chattanooga-based developer Franklin L. Haney, won the auction to purchase the Bellefonte Nuclear Plant with a bid of $111 million, three times the minimum bid of $36.4 million. Nuclear Development intended to complete the two units at a projected additional investment of over $13 billion. Haney's bid beat the only other bidder, Jackson Holdings of Alabama LLC, which was hoping to use components from the unfinished plant for a reactor under construction in India. Another prospective bidder, Phoenix Energy of Nevada, was unable to complete financing arrangements in time to place a bid.

As of November 2017, construction at the facility was expected to start by the end of 2018 and take approximately five years to complete. Nuclear Development LLC made agreements to partner with SNC-Lavalin and Enercon Services, Inc. in the completion of the project.

In August 2018, it was reported that Haney agreed to pay Michael Cohen (associate of President Donald Trump) $10 million in exchange for help obtaining federal funding for the project. Haney says he hired Cohen to pursue investment from a Qatari sovereign fund and that neither he nor Cohen sought to lobby Trump about DOE loan guarantees.

In December 2018, TVA pulled out of the sale agreement, citing failure by Haney to obtain regulatory approval for the transfer of the site. A federal judge ruled in May 2019 that the Tennessee Valley Authority (TVA) must continue to honor an agreement to sell the unfinished Bellefonte Nuclear Power Plant to a real estate developer who has said he would complete construction of the long-idled project. U.S. District Court Judge Liles C. Burke, in a 17-page opinion issued after a hearing in Huntsville, Alabama, declined to dismiss a lawsuit brought by developer Franklin Haney, who sued TVA in November 2018 for breach of contract after TVA said it could not complete the sale of the Bellefonte site and its assets to Haney’s Nuclear Development LLC The trial to either complete the sale or refund investments to Nuclear Development has been delayed due to the impacts of the COVID-19 pandemic and the matter has not come to trial as of February 25, 2021. In the meantime, TVA was continuing to maintain Bellefonte in accordance with the NRC permits. In August 2021, the court ruled that TVA was not required to sell the site to Haney's company.

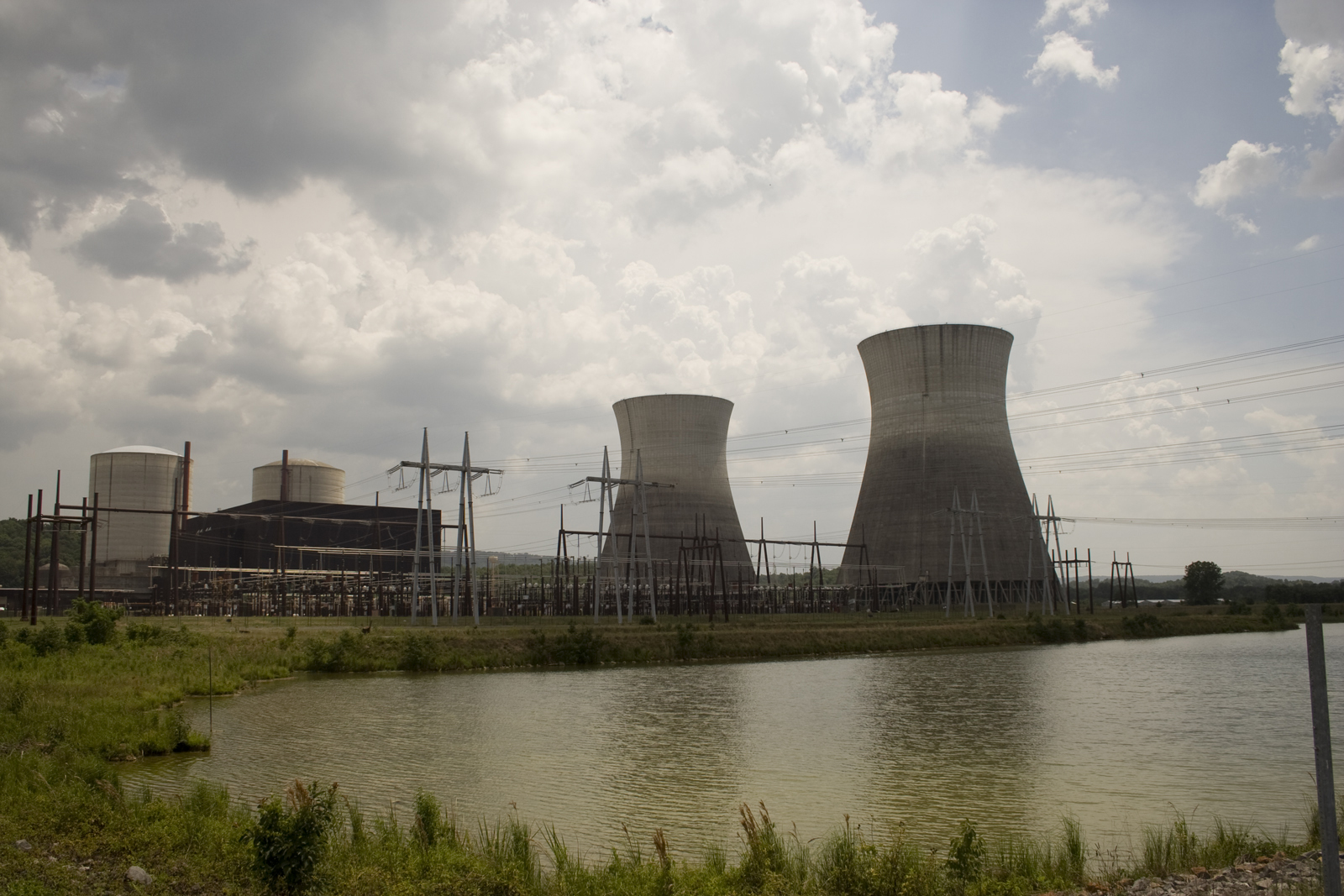
Bellefonte Nuclear Generating Station

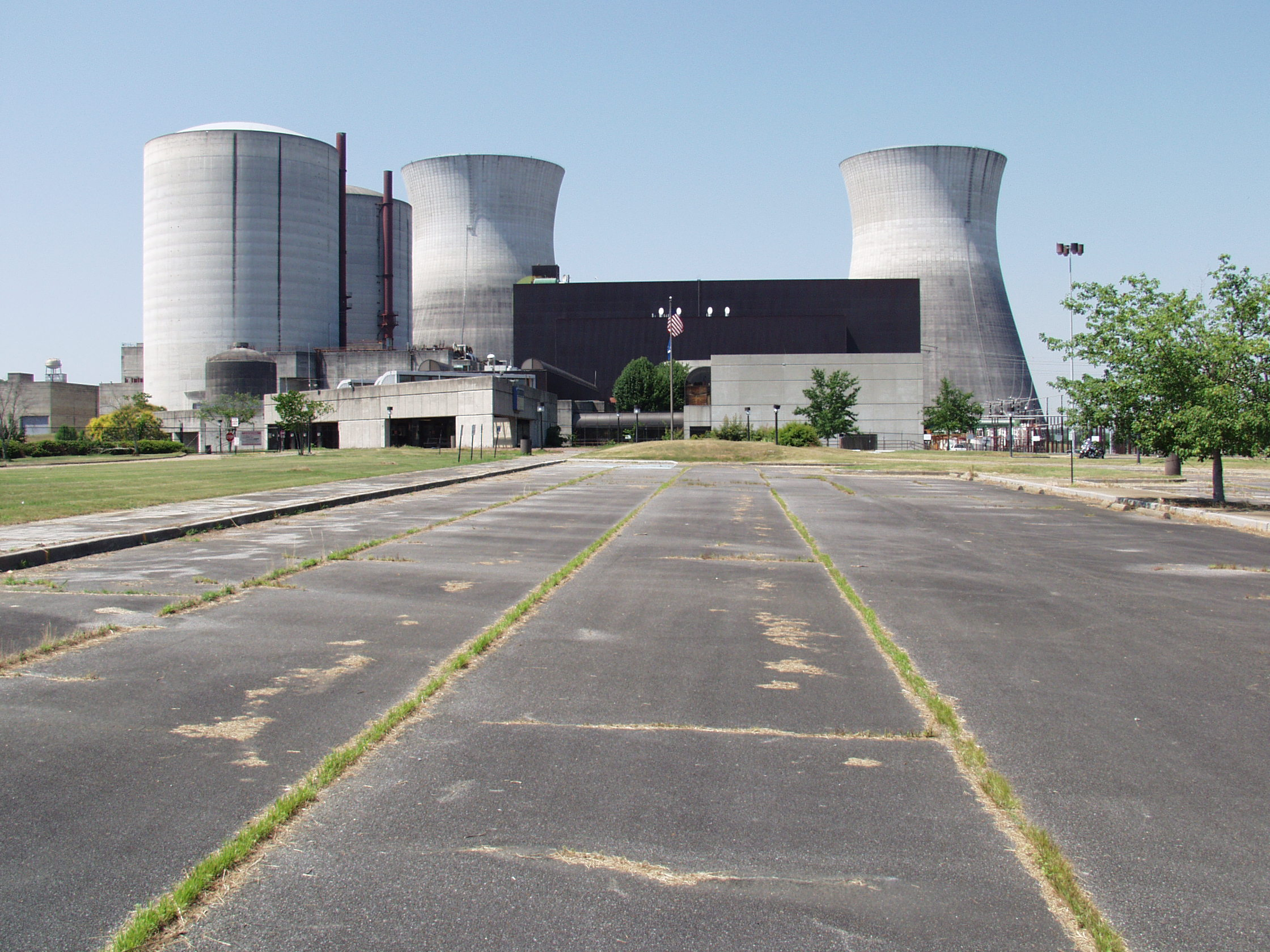
Bellefonte Nuclear in 2008

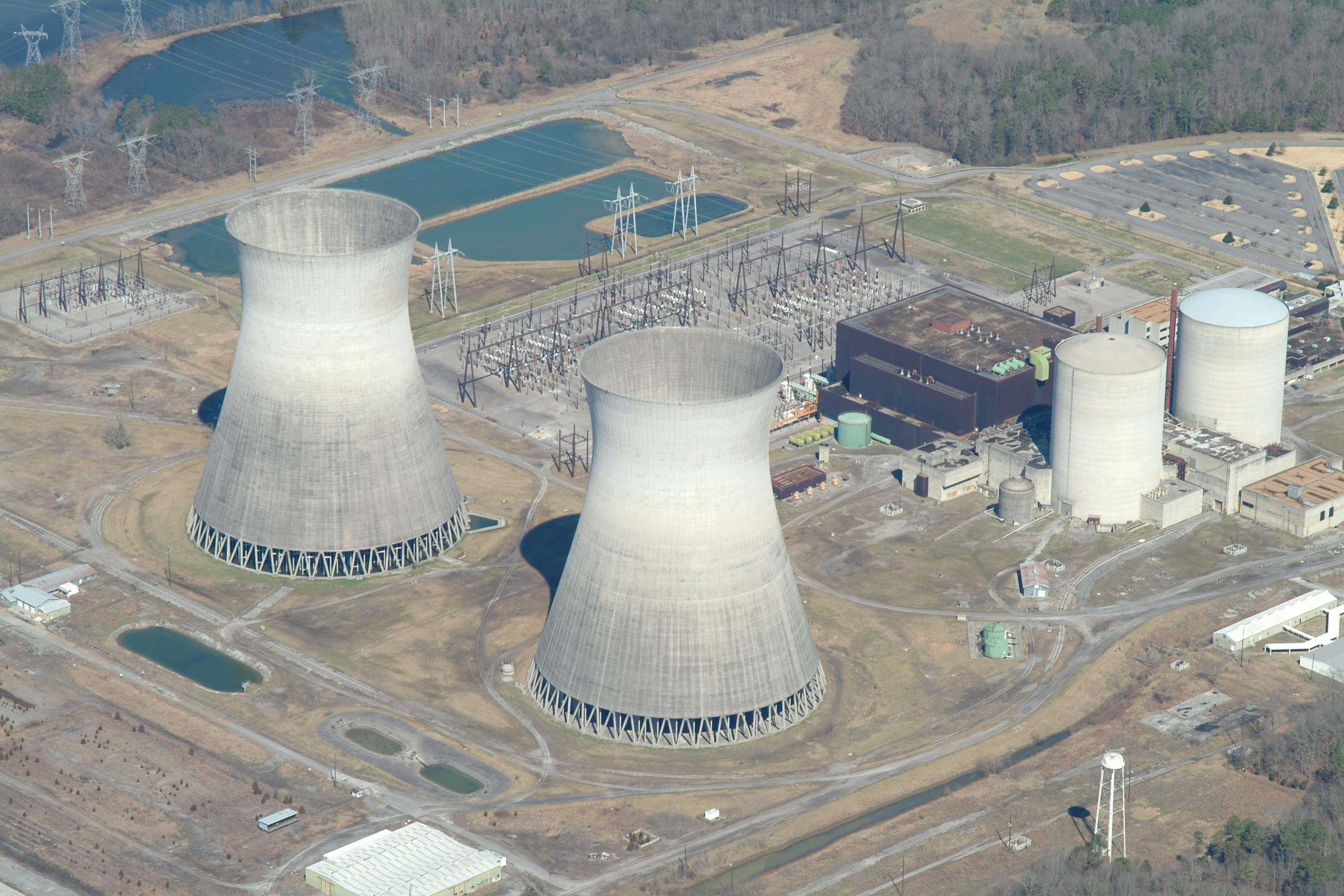
Bellefonte Nuclear - Aerial

=== Construction Permits ===
On 10 September 2021, TVA submitted a letter to the Nuclear Regulatory Commission withdrawing its request for an extension of the construction permits for the plant’s unfinished Babcock & Wilcox pressurized water reactors. The permits would expire on 1 October 2021. This effectively stopped any prospect of completing the plant as a nuclear generation facility.

== Reactor data ==
The Bellefonte Generating Station consisted of four cancelled reactors.

Reactor unit	Reactor type	Capacity(MW)		Construction started	Electricity grid connection	Commercial operation	Shutdown
Reactor unit	Reactor type	Net	Gross	Construction started	Electricity grid connection	Commercial operation	Shutdown
Bellefonte-1	B&W-205	1235	1263	01.01.1975	Cancelled construction on 01.01.1988, but planned to resume construction		
Bellefonte-2	B&W-205	1235	1263	01.01.1975	Cancelled construction on 01.01.1988, but planned to resume construction		
Bellefonte-3	AP1000	1117	0	Cancelled plant			
Bellefonte-4	AP1000	1117	0	Cancelled plant			

== See also ==
- List of canceled nuclear reactors in the United States
