= Yellow Creek Nuclear Plant =

Canceled nuclear power plant in Mississippi, US

Coordinates: 34.96°N 88.21°W

The Yellow Creek Nuclear Plant is a canceled nuclear power plant project near Iuka, Mississippi. It was originally planned to have two 1,350-MW (output) reactors operated by the Tennessee Valley Authority (TVA). The steam turbine-generator sets were provided by General Electric.

The reactors were System 80 pressurized water reactors built by Combustion Engineering. Three similar reactors were installed at Palo Verde Nuclear Generating Station near Tonopah, Arizona.

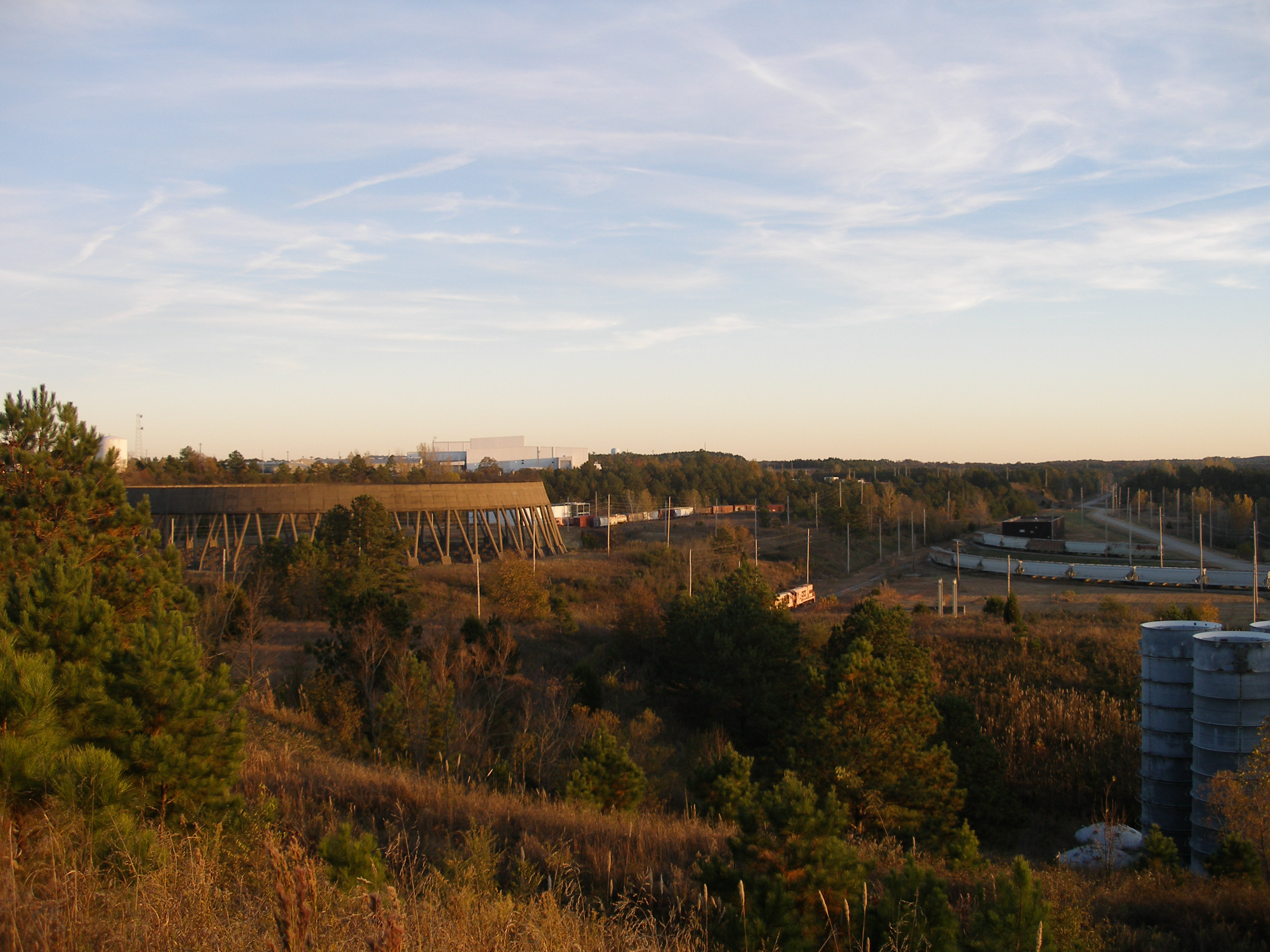
The site, as of 8 November 2010

Construction on the reactors began in 1978 but stopped in 1982 before the TVA officially canceled in the project in August 1984 due to dramatically rising construction costs and lower electricity demand.

Following TVA's cancellation, the partially completed site with infrastructure already in place underwent reconstruction as a site for NASA to build solid rocket motors. Construction was about 80% complete when Congress pulled funding on the site in 1993. The cancellation of this project led to a poor economy and high unemployment in the area.

Today, some buildings remain on the site including what was to be a reactor, the accompanying turbine building, and a circular base for the plant's cooling tower. The site is close to the tripoint of Mississippi, Alabama, and Tennessee, on a peninsula surrounded by Pickwick Lake. The site's namesake creek, whose original outlet comprised the western arm of the lake, was almost completely captured by the lake or channelized into the uppermost reach of the Tennessee-Tombigbee Waterway by the time plant construction ceased.

Parts of the site have been leased for several years by Flibe Energy to investigate pursuing their molten salt reactor designs.

== See also ==
- Nuclear power in the United States
- List of canceled nuclear plants in the United States
