= List of power stations operated by the Tennessee Valley Authority =

This is a list of power generating stations operated by the Tennessee Valley Authority.

== Dams and hydroelectric facilities ==
- Apalachia Dam
- Bear Creek Dam
- Beaver Creek Dam
- Beech Dam
- Blue Ridge Dam
- Boone Dam
- Cedar Creek Dam
- Cedar Dam
- Chatuge Dam
- Cherokee Dam
- Chickamauga Dam
- Clear Creek Dam
- Dogwood Dam
- Douglas Dam
- Fontana Dam
- Fort Loudoun Dam
- Fort Patrick Henry Dam
- Great Falls Dam
- Guntersville Dam
- Hiwassee Dam
- Kentucky Dam
- Little Bear Creek Dam
- Lost Creek Dam
- Melton Hill Dam
- Nickajack Dam
- Nolichucky Dam
- Normandy Dam
- Norris Dam
- Nottely Dam
- Ocoee Dams 1, 2, 3
- Pickwick Landing Dam
- Pin Oak Dam
- Pine Dam
- Raccoon Mountain Pumped-Storage Plant
- Redbud Dam
- South Holston Dam
- Sycamore Dam
- Tellico Dam
- Tims Ford Dam
- Upper Bear Creek Dam
- Watauga Dam
- Watts Bar Dam
- Wheeler Dam
- Wilbur Dam
- Wilson Dam

== Fossil fuel plants ==
Coal-fired power plants of the Tennessee Valley Authority
Name	Units	Capacity (MWe)	Location	Year of commission
Cumberland	2	2,470	Cumberland City, Tennessee	1973
Gallatin	4	967	Gallatin, Tennessee	1956
Kingston	9	1,398	Kingston, Tennessee	1954
Shawnee	9	1,206	West Paducah, Kentucky	1953

Natural gas dual-fuel combustion turbine (CT) and combined cycle (CC) plants of the Tennessee Valley Authority
Name	Type	Units	Capacity (MWe)	Location	Year of commission
Ackerman	CC	3	705	Ackerman, Mississippi	2007
Allen	CC	3	1,100	Memphis, Tennessee	2018
Brownsville	CT	4	468	Brownsville, Tennessee	1999
Caledonia	CC	3	765	Steens, Mississippi	2003
Colbert	CT	8	392	Tuscumbia, Alabama	1972
Gallatin	CT	8	600	Gallatin, Tennessee	1975
Gleason	CT	3	465	Gleason, Tennessee	2000
John Sevier	CC	3	880	Rogersville, Tennessee	2012
Johnsonville	CT	20	1,133	New Johnsonville, Tennessee	1975
Kemper	CT	4	312	De Kalb, Mississippi	2002
Lagoon Creek	Dual	12 (CT); 1 (CC)	904 (CT); 525 (CC)	Brownsville, Tennessee	2001 (CT); 2011 (CC)
Magnolia	CC	3	920	Ashland, Mississippi	2003
Marshall	CT	8	621	Calvert City, Kentucky	2002
Paradise	CC	3	1,130	Drakesboro, Kentucky	2017
Southaven	CC	3	774	Southaven, Mississippi	2003

== Nuclear power plants ==
Nuclear power plants of the Tennessee Valley Authority
Name	Units	Capacity (MWe)	Location	Year of commission
Browns Ferry Nuclear Plant	3	3,775	Limestone County, Alabama	1974
Sequoyah Nuclear Plant	2	2,333	Soddy-Daisy, Tennessee	1981
Watts Bar Nuclear Plant	2	2,332	Rhea County, Tennessee	1996 & 2016

== Joint facilities ==
TVA also assists ALCOA's Tapoco/APGI in regulating several facilities, including the Calderwood, Cheoah, Chilhowee, and Santeetlah dams.

== Renewable generation ==
TVA operates several small-scale facilities that generate electricity from renewable sources other than hydropower. These include:

Solar electric generation

- Lovers Lane soccer complex, Bowling Green, Kentucky (36 kW capacity)
- Finley Stadium, Chattanooga, Tennessee (85 kW)
- Gibson County High School, Dyer, Tennessee (18 kW)
- Florence, Alabama water treatment facility (30 kW)
- Sci-Quest Science Museum, Huntsville, Alabama (27 kW)
- Ijams Nature Center, Knoxville, Tennessee (15 kW)
- Bridges Center, Memphis, Tennessee (25 kW)
- Adventure Science Center, Nashville, Tennessee (27 kW)
- Cocke County High School, Newport, Tennessee (9 kW)
- American Museum of Science and Energy, Oak Ridge, Tennessee (15 kW)
- Oak Ridge National Laboratory, Oak Ridge, Tennessee (7 kW)
- University of Mississippi, University, Mississippi (30 kW)
- Dollywood in Pigeon Forge, Tennessee (two 18 kW facilities)
- Duffield-Pattonsville Elementary School, Scott County, Virginia (9 kW)
- Mississippi State University, Mississippi State, Mississippi (15 kW)

Wind power

At Buffalo Mountain in Oliver Springs, Tennessee, TVA operates three wind turbines with a combined generation capacity of 2 MW and purchases the output of 15 additional wind turbines owned by Invenergy that have a combined capacity of 27 MW. As of 2013, the agency had purchased agreements from power generated from wind farms outside its service area:

- 2012 – Enel Green Power, LLC – 201MW – Caney River Wind Farm, Elk County, Kansas.
- 2012 – Invenergy – 400MW – Bishop Hill Wind Energy Center, Henry County, Illinois
- 2012 – 200MW – California Ridge Wind Energy Center in Champaign County, Illinois
- 2012 – NextEra Energy Resources – 150MW – White Oak Energy Center, McLean County, Illinois
- 2012 – NextEra Energy Resources – 165MW – Cimarron Wind farm, Gray County, Kansas

A 2010 agreement with Iberdrola Renewables provides a potential 300MW future supply from Streator-Cayuga Ridge Wind Farm, Livingston County, Illinois

Waste-derived methane

Biogas from the Maxson wastewater treatment plant in Memphis is burned in Allen Fossil Plant, accounting for a generating capacity of 4 MW.

== Former facilities ==
Former generation facilities of the Tennessee Valley Authority
Name	Type	Capacity (MW)	Location	Years of operation
Hales Bar Dam	Hydroelectric	99.7	Haletown, Tennessee	1913–1967
Wilson Steam Plant	Coal	240	Muscle Shoals, Alabama	1919–1966
Watts Bar Steam Plant	Coal	267	Rhea County, Tennessee	1942–1982
John Sevier Fossil Plant	Coal	880	Hawkins County, Tennessee	1957–2012
Widows Creek Fossil Plant	Coal	1,800	Stevenson, Alabama	1952–2015
Colbert Fossil Plant	Coal	1,204	Tuscumbia, Alabama	1955–2016
Johnsonville Fossil Plant	Coal	1,500	New Johnsonville, Tennessee	1951–2017
Allen Fossil Plant	Coal	741	Memphis, Tennessee	1959–2018
Paradise Fossil Plant	Coal	2,379	Drakesboro, Kentucky	1963–2020
Bull Run Fossil Plant	Coal	881	Claxton, Tennessee	1967–2023

== Cancelled facilities ==
Cancelled facilities of the Tennessee Valley Authority
Name	Units	Location	Years of construction
Bellefonte Nuclear Plant	2	Hollywood, Alabama	1975–1988
Hartsville Nuclear Plant	4	Hartsville, Tennessee	1975–1984
Phipps Bend Nuclear Plant	2	Surgoinsville, Tennessee	1977–1981
Yellow Creek Nuclear Plant	2	Iuka, Mississippi	1978–1984

== See also ==
- List of power stations in Tennessee
- List of power stations in North Carolina
- List of power stations in Georgia (U.S. state)
- List of power stations in Alabama
- List of power stations in Mississippi
- List of power stations in Kentucky
- List of power stations in Virginia
