= List of power stations in Tennessee =

Net electricity generation by energy source in gigawatt-hours, 2025
1. Nuclear: 29,333 (39.0%)
2. Coal: 18,035 (24.0%)
3. Natural gas: 17,550 (23.3%)
4. Hydroelectric: 8,367 (11.1%)
5. Solar: 1,310 (1.74%)
6. Biomass 478 (0.64%)
7. Petroleum: 125 (0.17%)

The U.S. state of Tennessee receives its power from a variety of sources. The Tennessee Valley Authority (TVA) is the primary utility in Tennessee which generates electricity and sells it to hundreds of local utilities and industrial customers. Like most of the US, the sources used to generate power in Tennessee have changed substantially in the last decade. Coal's share of power has declined from nearly 60% in 2008 to about 25% in 2018, while natural gas has increased significantly. Tennessee is home to two of the newest nuclear reactors in the US at Watts Bar Nuclear Plant, unit 2 being the first to begin operation in the 21st century. After Watts Bar Unit 2 began operation in late 2016, nuclear power passed coal as the top source of electricity. In November 2018 natural gas produced more power than coal for the first time in Tennessee. Tennessee is home to the third largest pumped-storage hydroelectric facility in the US, and has the third highest net generation of hydroelectric power of states east of the Mississippi River, and eighth highest nationwide. In 2018, about 57% of the power consumed in Tennessee was generated with emissions free sources. Tennessee is a net consumer of electricity, consuming more power than it generates and receiving power from TVA facilities in neighboring states.

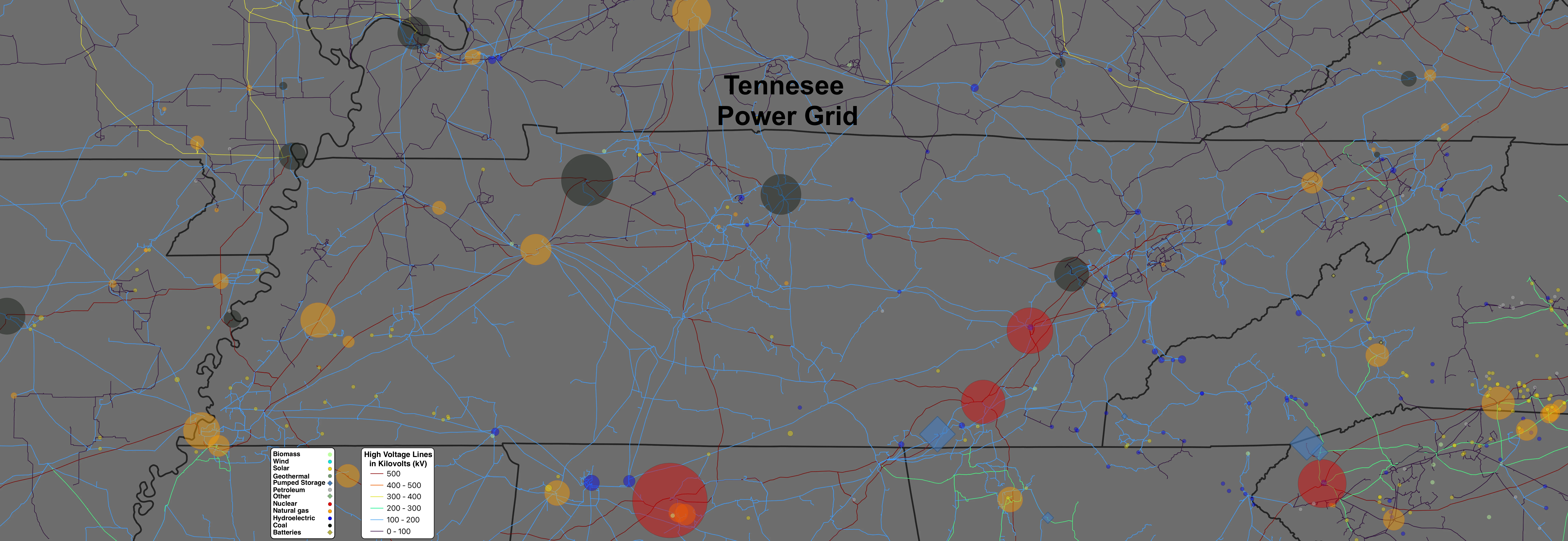
Tennessee power grid

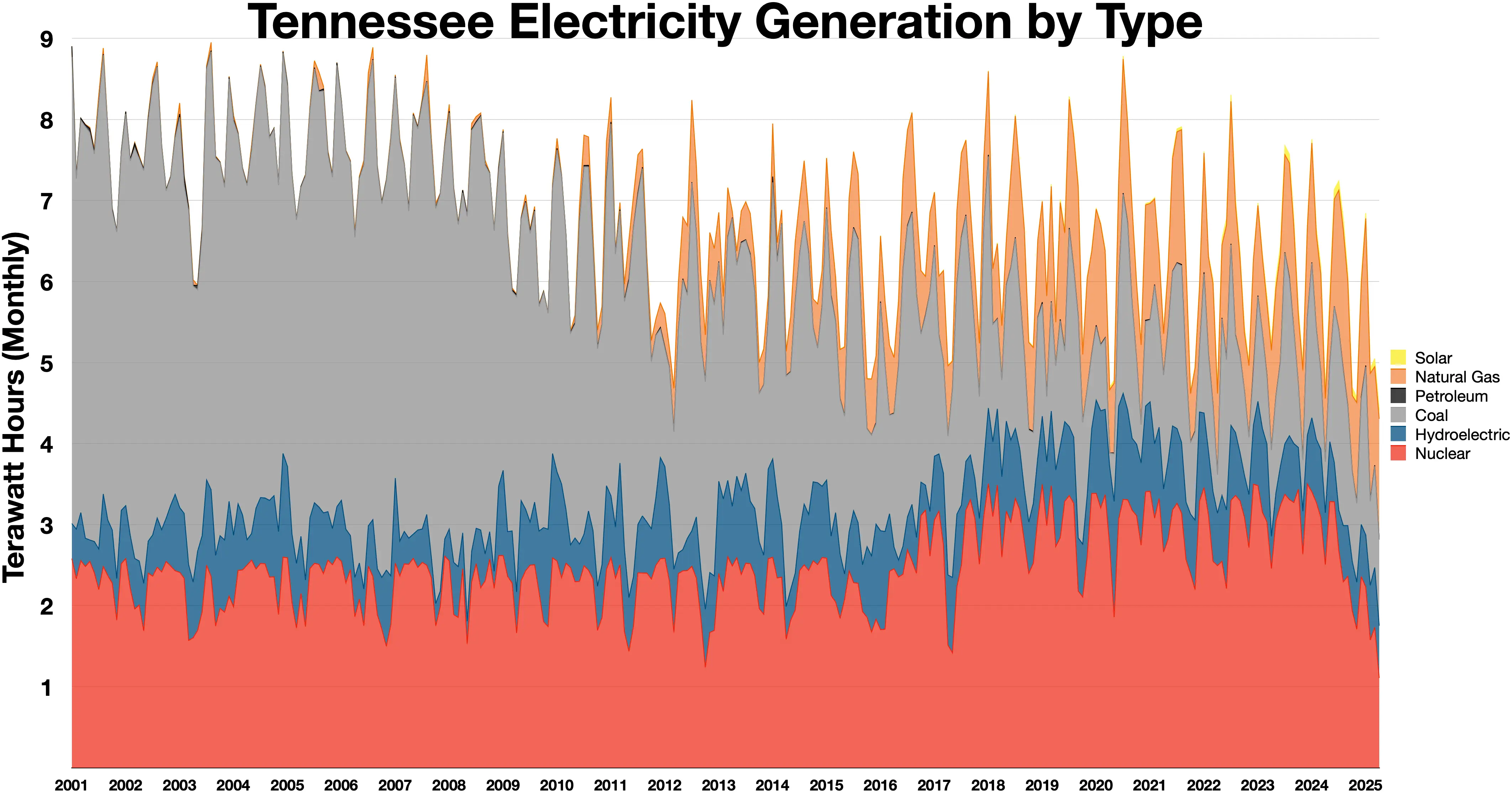
Tennessee electricity generation by type

== Biomass ==
Name	Location	Capacity (MW)	Operator	Year opened
City of Covington Waste-To-Energy Gasification Plant	Nashville, Tennessee	0.125	City of Nashville	2013

== Coal ==
Name	Location	Capacity (MW)	Operator	Year opened	Scheduled retirement
Cumberland Fossil Plant	Cumberland City, Tennessee	2,600	Tennessee Valley Authority	1973	2028
Gallatin Fossil Plant	Sumner County, Tennessee	1,255	Tennessee Valley Authority	1956	2035
Kingston Fossil Plant	Kingston, Tennessee	1,700	Tennessee Valley Authority	1954	2035

== Natural gas ==
The Tennessee Valley Authority operates nine natural gas power stations in Tennessee. Six of these use simple combustion turbines. Three newer facilities use more efficient combined cycle generators.

Name	Location	Type	Capacity (MW)	Operator	Year opened
Allen Combined Cycle Plant	Memphis, Tennessee	Gas, biogas	1,100	Tennessee Valley Authority	2018
Allen Combustion Turbine Plant	Memphis, Tennessee	Gas, biogas	456	Tennessee Valley Authority	1971
Brownsville Combustion Turbine Plant	Brownsville, Tennessee	Gas	468	Tennessee Valley Authority	1999
Gallatin Combustion Turbine Plant	Gallatin, Tennessee	Gas	600	Tennessee Valley Authority	1975
Gleason Combustion Turbine Plant	Weakley County, Tennessee	Gas	465	Tennessee Valley Authority	2000
Lagoon Creek Combined Cycle Plant	Brownsville, Tennessee	Gas	525	Tennessee Valley Authority	2010
Lagoon Creek Combustion Turbine Plant	Brownsville, Tennessee	Gas	941	Tennessee Valley Authority	2001
John Sevier Combined Cycle Plant	Rogersville, Tennessee	Gas	871	Tennessee Valley Authority	2012
Johnsonville Combustion Turbine Plant	New Johnsonville, Tennessee	Gas	1,133	Tennessee Valley Authority	1975, 2000

== Hydroelectric plants ==
Name	Location	Type	Capacity (MW)	Operator	Year opened
Boone Dam	Holston River	Hydroelectric	89	Tennessee Valley Authority	1952
Cheatham Dam	Cumberland River	Hydroelectric	36	United States Army Corps of Engineers	1960
Center Hill Dam	Cumberland River	Hydroelectric	160	United States Army Corps of Engineers	1950
Cherokee Dam	Holston River	Hydroelectric	136	Tennessee Valley Authority	1941
Chickamauga Dam	Tennessee River	Hydroelectric	119	Tennessee Valley Authority	1940
Cordell Hull Dam	Cumberland River	Hydroelectric	100	United States Army Corps of Engineers	1973
Douglas Dam	French Broad River	Hydroelectric	111	Tennessee Valley Authority	1943
Fort Loudoun Dam	Tennessee River	Hydroelectric	162	Tennessee Valley Authority	1943
Fort Patrick Henry Dam	Holston River	Hydroelectric	41	Tennessee Valley Authority	1953
Great Falls Dam	Caney Fork River	Hydroelectric	36	Tennessee Valley Authority	1916
J. Percy Priest Dam	Stones River	Hydroelectric	28	United States Army Corps of Engineers	1967
Melton Hill Dam	Clinch River	Hydroelectric	79	Tennessee Valley Authority	1963
Nickajack Dam	Tennessee River	Hydroelectric	105	Tennessee Valley Authority	1967
Norris Dam	Clinch River	Hydroelectric	110	Tennessee Valley Authority	1936
Ocoee Dam No. 1	Ocoee River	Hydroelectric	24	Tennessee Valley Authority	1911
Ocoee Dam No. 2	Ocoee River	Hydroelectric	23	Tennessee Valley Authority	1913
Ocoee Dam No. 3	Ocoee River	Hydroelectric	29	Tennessee Valley Authority	1943
Old Hickory Dam	Cumberland River	Hydroelectric	100	United States Army Corps of Engineers	1957
Pickwick Dam	Tennessee River	Hydroelectric	229	Tennessee Valley Authority	1938
Raccoon Mountain Facility	Tennessee River	Pumped storage hydro	1,652	Tennessee Valley Authority	1978
South Holston Dam	Holston River	Hydroelectric	44	Tennessee Valley Authority	1950
Tims Ford Dam	Elk River	Hydroelectric	36	Tennessee Valley Authority	1970
Watauga Dam	Watauga River	Hydroelectric	66	Tennessee Valley Authority	1948
Watts Bar Dam	Tennessee River	Hydroelectric	182	Tennessee Valley Authority	1942
Wilbur Dam	Watauga River	Hydroelectric	11	Tennessee Valley Authority	1912

== Wind farms ==
Name	Location	Capacity (MW)	Operator	Year opened
Buffalo Mountain Wind Farm	Oak Ridge, Tennessee	29	Tennessee Valley Authority	2000

== Solar stations ==
Name	Location	Capacity (MW)	Operator	Year opened
Allen Solar Plant	Memphis, Tennessee	1	Tennessee Valley Authority	2017
Chattanooga Metropolitan Airport Solar Farm	Chattanooga Metropolitan Airport, Chattanooga, Tennessee	2.1	Chattanooga Metropolitan Airport Authority	2011
Mulberry Solar Farm	McNairy County, Tennessee	20	Strata Solar	2014
Selmer Solar Farm	Selmer, Tennessee	20	Strata Solar	2014
Volkswagen Solar Farm	Volkswagen Chattanooga Assembly Plant, Chattanooga, Tennessee	9.5	Volkswagen Chattanooga Assembly Plant	2013
West Tennessee Solar Farm	Stanton, Tennessee	5	University of Tennessee	2012

== Nuclear plants ==
The Tennessee Valley Authority operates two nuclear plants in Tennessee. In addition much of the power generated at TVA's Browns Ferry Nuclear Plant in Limestone County, Alabama is distributed to Tennessee.

Name	Location	Capacity (MW)	Operator	Year opened
Sequoyah Nuclear Plant	Soddy-Daisy, Tennessee	2,300	Tennessee Valley Authority	1981
Watts Bar Nuclear Plant	Spring City, Tennessee	2,300	Tennessee Valley Authority	1996 and 2015

== Former facilities ==
=== Coal ===
Name	Location	Capacity (MW)	Operator	Year opened	Year retired
Eastman Chemical Power Plant	Kingsport, Tennessee	131	Eastman Chemical Co-TN Ops	1936	1994
Allen Fossil Plant	Memphis, Tennessee	990	Tennessee Valley Authority	1959	2018
Watts Bar Steam Plant	Rhea County, Tennessee	267	Tennessee Valley Authority	1942	1982
John Sevier Fossil Plant	Hawkins County, Tennessee	880	Tennessee Valley Authority	1957	2012
Johnsonville Fossil Plant	New Johnsonville, Tennessee	1500	Tennessee Valley Authority	1951	2017
Bull Run Fossil Plant	Claxton, Tennessee	950	Tennessee Valley Authority	1967	2023

=== Hydroelectric ===
Station	Location	Type	Capacity (MW)	Status	Year opened	Year closed
Hales Bar Dam	Haletown, Tennessee	Hydroelectric	71	Decommissioned	1913	1952

== Cancelled facilities ==
Station	Location	Type	Units	Year construction began	Year cancelled
Hartsville Nuclear Plant	Hartsville, Tennessee	Nuclear	4	1975	1984
Phipps Bend Nuclear Plant	Surgoinsville, Tennessee	Nuclear	2	1977	1981

== See also ==
- List of power stations operated by the Tennessee Valley Authority
