= Watts Bar =

Watts Bar may refer to:

- Watts Bar Nuclear Plant
- Watts Bar Dam
- Watts Bar Steam Plant
- Watts Bar Lake
