= Johnsonville Combustion Turbine Plant =

Natural gas power station in Humphreys County, Tennessee, United States

- Country: United States
- Location: New Johnsonville, Tennessee
- Coordinates: 36°2′6″N 87°59′2″W
- Status: Operational
- Commission date: Units 1–16: 1975; Units 17–20: 2000
- Owner: Tennessee Valley Authority
- Operator: Tennessee Valley Authority

Thermal power station
- Primary fuel: Natural gas
- Cooling source: Tennessee River

Power generation
- Units operational: 20
- Nameplate capacity: 1,200 MW

The Johnsonville Combustion Turbine Plant is a 1.2-gigawatt (1,200 MW), simple cycle natural gas power plant located in New Johnsonville, Tennessee in Humphreys County, Tennessee. It is operated by the Tennessee Valley Authority (TVA).

== Background ==
In 1975, the TVA constructed 16 combustion turbine units at Johnsonville. Four more combustion turbine units were added in 2000. These 20 units have a combined generating capacity of 1.2 gigawatts. With the closure of the Johnsonville Fossil Plant, the TVA added a heat recovery generator to one of the combustion turbine units in 2017 to create the steam needed to produce titanium dioxide (TiO_{2}) at the nearby Chemours plant.

== See also ==
- List of power stations in Tennessee
