= Sequoyah Nuclear Plant =

Nuclear power plant in Hamilton County, Tennessee

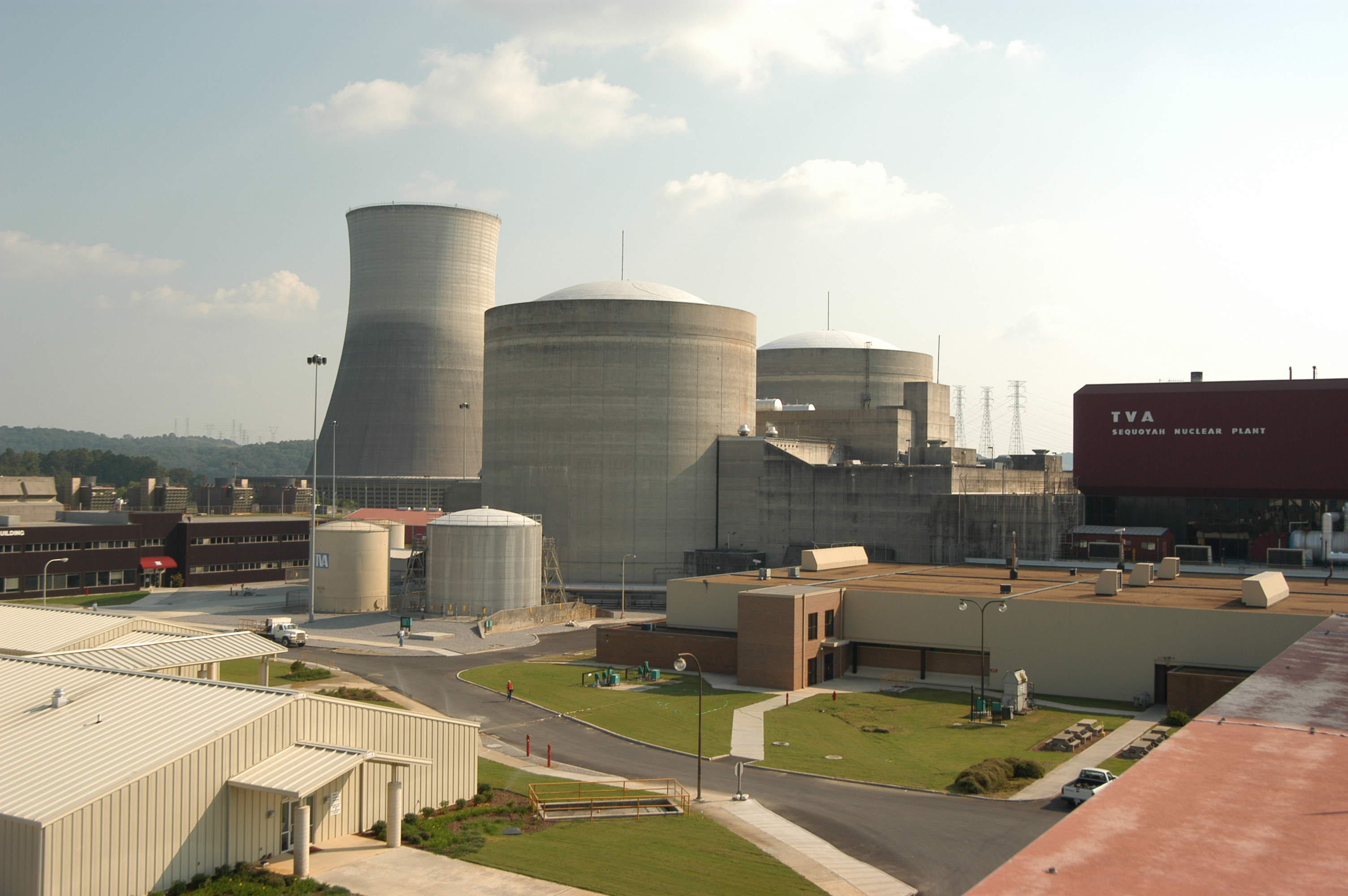
- Country: United States
- Location: Hamilton County, near Soddy-Daisy, Tennessee
- Coordinates: 35°13′35″N 85°5′30″W
- Status: Operational
- Construction began: May 27, 1970
- Commission date: Unit 1: July 1, 1981; Unit 2: June 1, 1982
- Construction cost: $3.455 billion (2007 USD)
- Owner: Tennessee Valley Authority
- Operator: Tennessee Valley Authority

Nuclear power station
- Reactor type: PWR
- Reactor supplier: Westinghouse
- Cooling towers: 2 × Natural Draft (supplemental only)
- Cooling source: Chickamauga Lake
- Thermal capacity: 2 × 3455 MW_{th}

Power generation
- Units operational: 2 × 1220 MW
- Make and model: WH 4-loop (ICECND)
- Nameplate capacity: 2440 MW
- Capacity factor: 91.38% (2017); 75.50% (lifetime)
- Annual net output: 17,654 GWh (2021)

External links
- Website: Sequoyah Nuclear Plant
- Commons: Related media on Commons

The Sequoyah Nuclear Plant is a nuclear power plant located on 525 acres (212 ha) located seven miles (11 km) east of Soddy-Daisy, Tennessee, and 20 miles (32 km) north of Chattanooga, abutting Chickamauga Lake on the Tennessee River. The facility is owned and operated by the Tennessee Valley Authority (TVA).

The plant has two Westinghouse pressurized water reactors. Sequoyah units 1 and 2, as well as their sister plant at Watts Bar, both have ice condenser containment systems. In case of a large loss-of-coolant accident, steam generated by the leak is directed toward borated ice which helps condense the steam creating a lower pressure, allowing for a smaller containment building.

== Description ==
Sequoyah's two units have a winter net dependable capacity of 2,440 megawatts, making it the second most powerful plant in TVA's operating fleet. Sequoyah is the second-most powerful power plant in Tennessee, after the Cumberland Fossil Plant northwest of Nashville, but actually generates more power.

TVA constructed dry cask storage facilities at Sequoyah and purchased special storage containers for the purpose of storing spent nuclear fuel. The storage facilities have been approved by the NRC.

== History ==
Construction began on Sequoyah on May 27, 1970. Unit 1 was licensed by the NRC on September 17, 1980, and commercial operation began on July 1, 1981. Unit 2 was licensed on September 15, 1981, and began operation on June 1, 1982. Sequoyah was the first new nuclear plant licensed after the Three Mile Island accident.

On August 22, 1985, Sequoyah was shut down due to safety concerns. An independent contractor hired to analyze the safety systems of the plant had found that TVA lacked documentation proving that all of the plant's safety systems would function properly in the event of an emergency. Brown's Ferry, TVA's only other operating nuclear plant at the time, had been shut down in March 1985, due to safety concerns about a fire ten years earlier, and during this time, TVA was without nuclear power completely. On March 22, 1988, TVA was authorized by the NRC to restart both Sequoyah units. Both reactors returned to service later that year.

The operating license of Sequoyah's Unit 1 was originally set to expire in 2020, and Unit 2's operating license in 2021. In 2015, the NRC renewed the operating license for both units for an additional 20 years. TVA's Sequoyah operating license was modified in September 2002 to allow TVA to irradiate tritium-producing burnable absorber rods at Sequoyah for the U.S. Department of Energy. The process of irradiating tritium-producing rods produces tritium, which is used in nuclear weapons and for various forms of research into nuclear fusion for commercial power production. TVA began irradiating tritium-producing rods at its Watts Bar Nuclear Plant in 2003. As of February 2007, TVA had no plans to produce tritium at Sequoyah.

== Name ==
Sequoyah was a Cherokee, part of the Overhill Cherokee, reportedly born in Tuskegee, a town at the confluence of the Tellico River and Little Tennessee River, upriver of the nuclear power plant. He is known for creating the Cherokee syllabary circa 1820. Many Cherokee sites were flooded during the TVA construction of Tellico Dam (1967-1979). Naming the site after a local Native American was considered a small political token to the Cherokee in compensation for the dam-flooding and destruction of their historic sites that TVA required to control flooding on the Tennessee River.

== Electricity production ==
Generation (MWh) of Sequoyah Nuclear Plant
| Year | Jan | Feb | Mar | Apr | May | Jun | Jul | Aug | Sep | Oct | Nov | Dec | Annual (Total) |
|---|---|---|---|---|---|---|---|---|---|---|---|---|---|
| 2001 | 1,715,621 | 1,547,274 | 1,688,182 | 1,652,227 | 1,691,701 | 1,626,029 | 1,651,666 | 1,651,496 | 1,618,505 | 1,416,882 | 989,416 | 1,700,857 | 18,949,856 |
| 2002 | 1,712,498 | 1,548,129 | 1,712,696 | 1,179,383 | 1,020,499 | 1,588,579 | 1,578,618 | 1,642,669 | 1,605,861 | 1,691,656 | 1,648,005 | 1,566,979 | 18,495,572 |
| 2003 | 1,538,148 | 1,549,716 | 889,060 | 772,530 | 843,504 | 1,109,805 | 1,668,475 | 1,585,871 | 1,602,956 | 1,715,357 | 1,079,412 | 1,248,935 | 15,603,769 |
| 2004 | 1,194,378 | 1,622,496 | 1,580,743 | 1,670,244 | 1,716,912 | 1,643,689 | 1,690,048 | 1,685,688 | 1,644,212 | 1,509,633 | 1,061,493 | 1,735,832 | 18,755,368 |
| 2005 | 1,734,248 | 1,464,350 | 1,736,755 | 1,362,460 | 892,497 | 1,653,280 | 1,694,189 | 1,687,558 | 1,635,444 | 1,716,106 | 1,678,363 | 1,743,903 | 18,999,153 |
| 2006 | 1,682,219 | 1,570,914 | 1,604,291 | 1,042,998 | 1,274,216 | 1,647,754 | 1,678,165 | 1,664,688 | 1,633,330 | 1,716,109 | 1,511,763 | 974,232 | 18,000,679 |
| 2007 | 1,677,855 | 1,571,210 | 1,673,450 | 1,668,096 | 1,723,137 | 1,654,059 | 1,691,561 | 1,676,085 | 1,534,271 | 898,508 | 1,143,344 | 1,739,109 | 18,650,685 |
| 2008 | 1,679,170 | 1,626,605 | 1,735,160 | 1,618,395 | 947,397 | 1,504,251 | 1,681,616 | 1,657,270 | 1,639,447 | 1,715,045 | 1,371,138 | 1,741,814 | 18,917,308 |
| 2009 | 1,740,512 | 1,569,882 | 1,448,218 | 821,378 | 1,451,044 | 1,614,963 | 1,658,103 | 1,666,440 | 1,625,477 | 1,530,500 | 910,663 | 1,717,356 | 17,754,536 |
| 2010 | 1,718,954 | 1,553,344 | 1,651,286 | 1,631,962 | 1,611,012 | 1,487,684 | 1,656,024 | 1,637,160 | 1,510,126 | 834,089 | 1,136,914 | 1,572,209 | 18,000,764 |
| 2011 | 1,719,514 | 1,553,966 | 1,714,720 | 1,621,161 | 1,319,880 | 946,454 | 1,572,796 | 1,578,718 | 1,582,198 | 1,699,007 | 1,662,103 | 1,717,676 | 18,688,193 |
| 2012 | 1,718,158 | 1,490,254 | 810,376 | 1,567,210 | 1,583,774 | 1,622,332 | 1,654,948 | 1,585,666 | 1,621,590 | 1,231,806 | 834,276 | 865,240 | 16,585,630 |
| 2013 | 1,530,558 | 1,393,076 | 1,740,503 | 1,662,106 | 1,745,413 | 1,641,303 | 1,690,971 | 1,680,336 | 1,557,244 | 1,109,768 | 1,054,061 | 1,720,672 | 18,526,011 |
| 2014 | 1,723,956 | 1,557,221 | 1,719,014 | 1,596,760 | 1,083,378 | 1,133,896 | 1,680,276 | 1,673,600 | 1,625,520 | 1,704,334 | 1,668,578 | 1,725,858 | 18,892,391 |
| 2015 | 1,715,648 | 1,559,658 | 1,261,819 | 1,022,368 | 1,233,518 | 1,633,998 | 1,481,601 | 1,454,372 | 1,437,850 | 1,669,386 | 1,067,578 | 973,526 | 16,511,322 |
| 2016 | 841,395 | 910,071 | 1,718,696 | 1,654,185 | 1,535,866 | 1,625,351 | 1,655,503 | 1,644,646 | 1,605,992 | 1,688,908 | 1,514,545 | 847,450 | 17,242,608 |
| 2017 | 1,300,005 | 1,576,214 | 1,717,976 | 1,537,391 | 848,472 | 1,456,860 | 1,675,580 | 1,665,170 | 1,630,554 | 1,446,387 | 1,664,360 | 1,722,330 | 18,241,299 |
| 2018 | 1,723,352 | 1,506,345 | 1,718,484 | 987,565 | 1,482,122 | 1,636,994 | 1,664,194 | 1,666,828 | 1,607,022 | 1,550,238 | 866,069 | 1,294,536 | 17,703,749 |
| 2019 | 1,720,494 | 1,554,495 | 1,717,933 | 1,557,931 | 1,702,708 | 1,636,150 | 1,675,144 | 1,576,388 | 1,394,369 | 1,017,551 | 890,814 | 1,620,642 | 18,064,619 |
| 2020 | 1,623,312 | 1,612,766 | 1,694,162 | 1,057,335 | 1,438,839 | 1,642,519 | 1,655,788 | 1,644,477 | 1,626,036 | 1,709,727 | 1,667,841 | 1,726,387 | 19,099,189 |
| 2021 | 1,726,934 | 1,559,132 | 1,723,128 | 1,069,104 | 1,196,380 | 1,640,426 | 1,678,000 | 1,560,825 | 1,520,846 | 869,782 | 1,385,317 | 1,724,938 | 17,654,812 |
| 2022 | 1,725,344 | 1,558,934 | 1,722,122 | 1,662,014 | 1,707,980 | 1,413,209 | 1,667,490 | 1,667,082 | 1,632,618 | 1,371,240 | 972,084 | 1,727,182 | 18,827,299 |
| 2023 | 1,727,636 | 1,558,590 | 1,279,805 | 1,228,445 | 1,709,744 | 1,647,568 | 1,682,352 | 1,670,278 | 1,623,820 | 1,705,108 | 1,667,966 | 1,726,284 | 19,227,596 |
| 2024 | 1,724,688 | 1,615,608 | 1,417,869 | 819,785 | 1,681,828 | 1,630,998 | 1,334,890 | 596,777 | 706,552 | 202,606 | 832,268 | 863,408 | 13,427,277 |
| 2025 | 860,283 | 779,347 | 862,137 | 831,153 | 876,499 | 877,933 | 1,664,372 | 1,664,252 | 1,587,786 | 916,710 | 598,394 | 1,541,064 | 13,059,930 |
| 2026 | 1,725,080 | 1,450,823 | 1,720,146 | 1,654,148 | 1,703,165 | 1,640,490 | 1,677,021 | 1,650,907 | | | | | -- |

== Surrounding population ==
The NRC defines two emergency planning zones around nuclear power plants: a plume exposure pathway zone of 10 miles (16 km) radius (concerned primarily with exposure to, and inhalation of, airborne radioactive contamination), and an ingestion pathway zone of about 50 miles (80 km) radius (concerned primarily with ingestion of food and liquid contaminated by radioactivity).

The 2010 U.S. population within 10 miles (16 km) of Sequoyah was 99,664, according to 2010 U.S. Census data analyzed for msnbc.com, an increase of 13.8 percent in a decade. The 2010 U.S. population within 50 miles (80 km) was 1,079,868 (increase of 13.8 percent). Cities within 50 miles include Chattanooga (14 miles to city center).

== Seismic risk ==
The NRC's estimate of the risk each year of an earthquake intense enough to cause core damage to the reactor at Sequoyah was 1 in 19,608, according to an NRC study published in August 2010.

== See also ==
- List of largest power stations in the United States
- List of power stations in Tennessee
