= List of power stations in Mississippi =

Sources of Mississippi utility-scale electricity generation in gigawatt-hours, full-year 2025:
1. Natural gas: 57,755 (73.9%)
2. Nuclear: 11,493 (14.7%)
3. Coal: 4,181 (5.35%)
4. Solar: 2,875 (3.68%)
5. Biomass: 1,326 (1.70%)
6. Wind: 500 (0.64%)

This is a list of electricity-generating power stations in the U.S. state of Mississippi, sorted by type and name. In 2024, Mississippi had a total summer capacity of 16.0 GW through all of its power plants, and a net generation of 77,337 GWh. In 2025, the electrical energy generation mix was 73.9% natural gas, 14.7% nuclear, 5.4% coal, 3.7% solar, 1.7% biomass, and 0.6% wind.

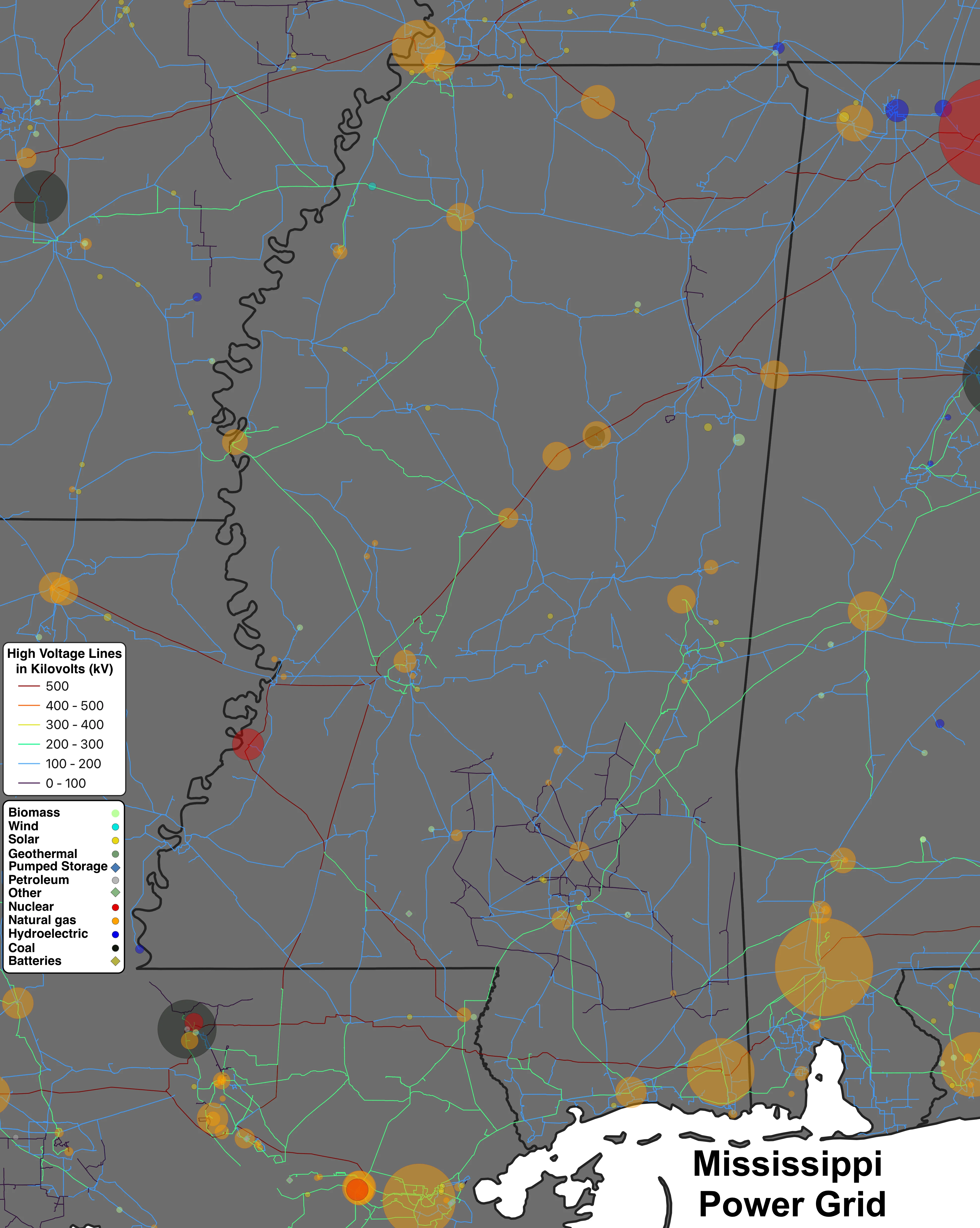
Mississippi power grid

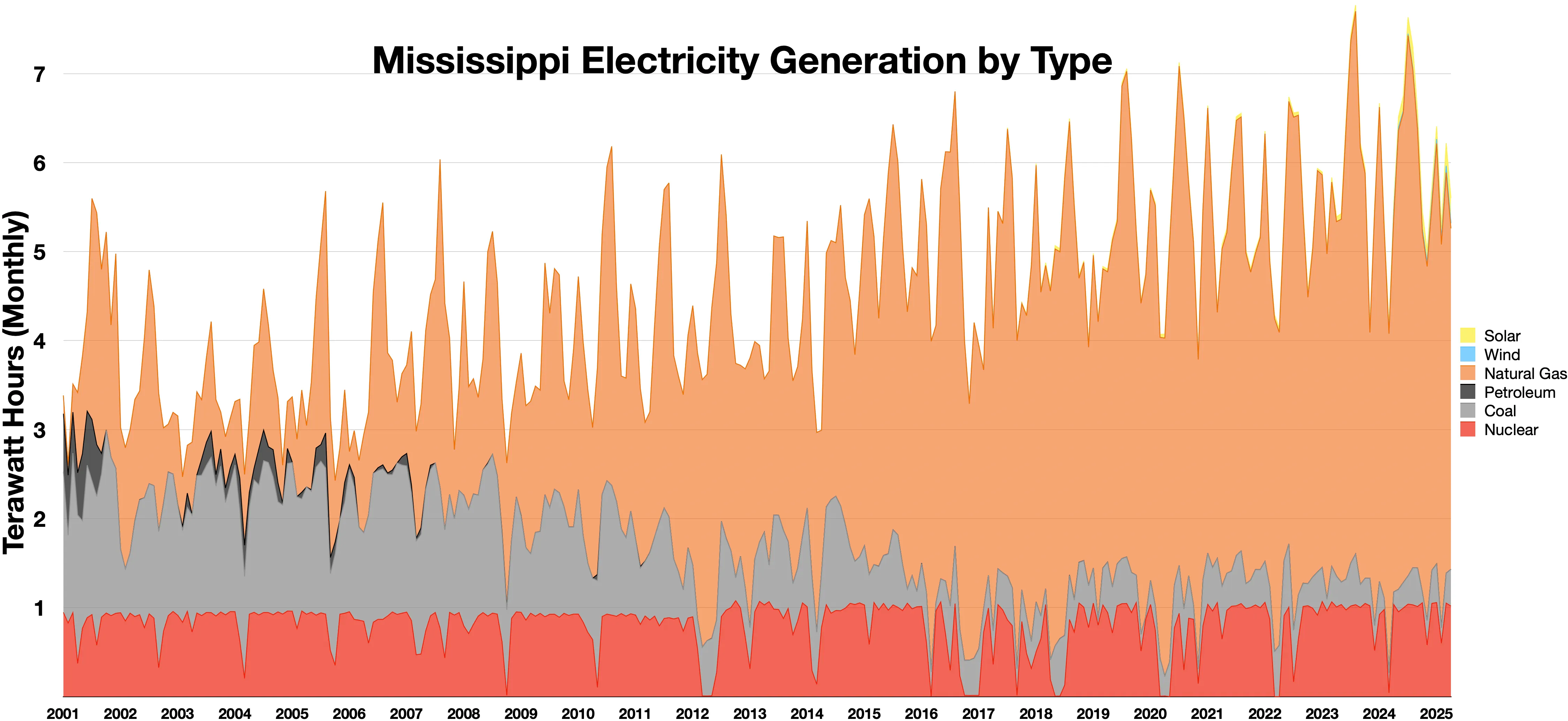
Mississippi electricity generation by type

== Nuclear power plants ==
Name	Location	Coordinates	Capacity (MW)	Operator	Year opened
Grand Gulf Nuclear Station	Port Gibson	32°00′29″N 91°02′52″W	1,401	Entergy	1985

== Fossil-fuel power plants ==
=== Coal ===
Name	Location	Coordinates	Capacity (MW)	Operator	Year opened
Red Hills Generation Facility	Ackerman	33°22′34″N 89°13′06″W	440	SE Choctaw, LLC	2001
Victor J. Daniel Electric Generating Plant	Escatawpa	30°31′56″N 88°33′19″W	1,004	Mississippi Power, Gulf Power	1977

=== Natural gas ===
Name	Location	Capacity (MW)	Operator	Year opened
Ackerman Combined Cycle Plant	Ackerman	710	Tennessee Valley Authority	2007
Attala Generating Station	Sallis	455.3	Entergy	2001
Batesville Generation Facility	Batesville	858	Cooperative Energy	2000
Caledonia Combined Cycle Plant	Steens	765	Tennessee Valley Authority	2003
CF Industries Yazoo City Complex	Yazoo City	20	CF Industries	1984
Chevron Cogenerating Plant	Pascagoula	132	Mississippi Power	1968
Choctaw County Generating Station	French Camp	781	Entergy	2003
Gerald Andrus Power Plant	Greenville	736	Entergy	1975
Hinds Energy Facility	Jackson	491	Entergy	2001
Kemper Combustion Turbine Plant	De Kalb	293.2	Tennessee Valley Authority	2002
LL Wilkins Power Plant	Clarksdale	49.5	Clarksdale Public Utilities	1961
Magnolia Combined Cycle Plant	Ashland	918	Tennessee Valley Authority	2003
Moselle Generating Station	Moselle	477	Cooperative Energy	1970
Plant Daniel	Escatawpa	1,081	Mississippi Power	2001
Plant Jack Watson	Gulfport	749	Mississippi Power	2015
Plant Ratcliffe	De Kalb	675.4	Mississippi Power	2014
Plant Sweatt	Meridian	32	Mississippi Power	1951
Silver Creek Generating Plant	Prentiss	225	Cooperative Energy	2003
Southaven Combined Cycle Plant	Southaven	780	Tennessee Valley Authority	2003
Sylvarena Generating Plant	Raleigh	129	Cooperative Energy	2003
Yazoo	Yazoo City	33.3	Public Service Commission of Yazoo City	1954

== Renewable power plants ==
Data from the U.S. Energy Information Administration.

=== Biomass and municipal waste ===
Name	Location	Coordinates	Capacity (MW)	Fuel type	Operator	Year opened
Columbus MS	Lowndes County	33°21′37″N 88°27′36″W	128.6	Wood/wood waste	International Paper	1982/1987/ 1990
Georgia-Pacific Monticello Paper	Lawrence County	31°37′43″N 90°04′51″W	81.5	Wood/wood waste	Georgia-Pacific	1968
Intl. Paper Vicksburg Mill	Warren County	32°31′45″N 90°46′27″W	38.5	Wood/wood waste	International Paper	1967
Leaf River Cellulose	Perry County	31°14′36″N 89°02′44″W	52.2	Wood/wood waste	Leaf River LLC.	1984
Prairie Bluff	Chickasaw County	33°57′16″N 88°59′33″W	1.6	Landfill gas	Waste Management	2012

=== Solar ===
Name	Location	Coordinates	Capacity (MW)	Year opened
Hattiesburg Solar Farm	Forrest County	31°16′33″N 89°18′04″W	50.0	2017
Meridian Solar Farm (I&II)	Lauderdale County	32°33′12″N 88°34′49″W	57.5	2019
Sumrall Solar Farm (I&II)	Lamar County	31°24′13″N 89°29′51″W	104.0	2017

=== Wind ===
Name	Location	Coordinates	Capacity (MW)	Year opened
Delta Wind	Tunica County		184	2024

== See also ==
- List of power stations in the United States
- List of power stations operated by the Tennessee Valley Authority
