= Allen Fossil Plant =

Former coal-fired power station near Memphis , Tennessee, United States

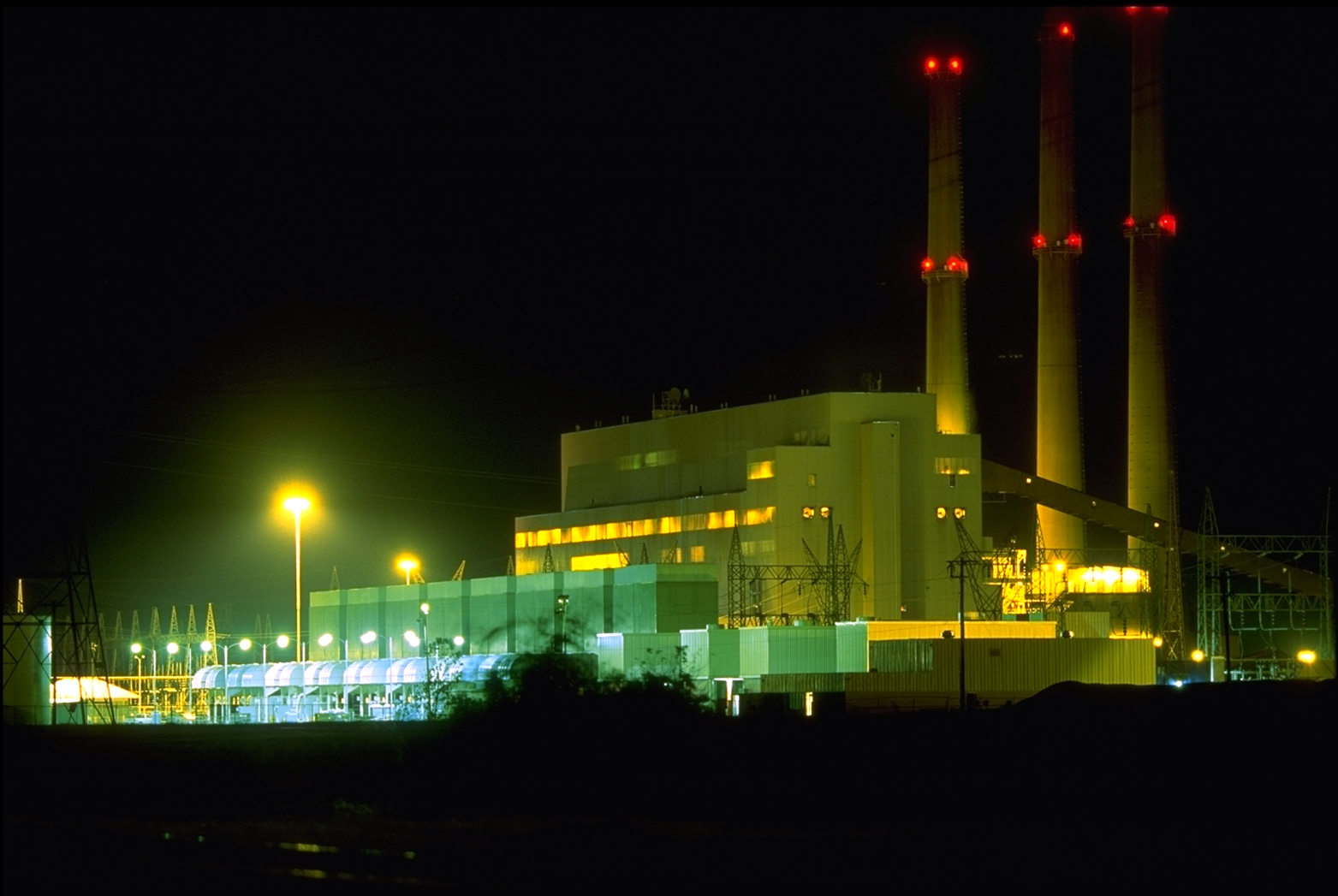
- Former Allen Fossil Plant in 2010
- Country: United States
- Location: Memphis, Tennessee
- Coordinates: 35°4′25″N 90°8′55″W
- Status: Decommissioned
- Commission date: Units 1–3: 1959
- Decommission date: Units 1–3: March, 2018
- Owner: Tennessee Valley Authority
- Operator: Tennessee Valley Authority

Thermal power station
- Primary fuel: Coal
- Cooling source: Memphis Light, Gas and Water

Power generation
- Nameplate capacity: 741 MW

External links
- Commons: Related media on Commons

The Allen Fossil Plant was a 741-megawatt (MW), coal power plant located south of Memphis, Tennessee. It generated electricity from 1959 to 2018. At the time of its closure, the plant was operated by Tennessee Valley Authority (TVA).

== History ==
Memphis Light, Gas and Water (MLGW) began construction of the Allen Fossil Plant in 1956 with commercial generation beginning in 1959. The plant was named after Thomas H. Allen, a former president of MLGW. The TVA took over plant operations in 1964 as a lease with MLGW before buying the plant outright in 1984. Allen had a generating capacity of 741 MW. TVA announced plans that Allen would be replaced with by the Allen Combined Cycle Plant, a natural gas plant, in order to reduce emissions by 2018 set by a 2011 agreement with the Environmental Protection Agency (EPA). TVA shut down the plant on March 31, 2018.

== Environmental impact ==
Byproducts from Allen, known as coal combustion residuals (CCR), were deposited in the West Ash Impoundment. These residuals were known to contain arsenic. When the TVA released an environmental impact statement (EIS) of the impoundment in 2016, three options were generated to deal with approximately 250,000 cubic yards of CCR once the plant closed. Ultimately, the TVA opted for Alternative B. The CCR would remain in place in the impoundment, but modifications of the site would be made to minimize leachate escaping into the Mississippi River, local groundwater, and nearby McKellar Lake. Groundwater monitoring equipment would also be installed at the site.

== See also ==
- List of power stations in Tennessee
