= Allen Combined Cycle Plant =

- Country: United States
- Location: Memphis, Tennessee
- Coordinates: 35°04′01″N 90°08′40″W
- Status: Operational
- Commission date: Units 1–3: April, 2018
- Owner: Tennessee Valley Authority
- Operator: Tennessee Valley Authority

Thermal power station
- Primary fuel: Natural gas
- Cooling source: Memphis Light, Gas and Water

Power generation
- Nameplate capacity: 1,100 MW

The Allen Combined Cycle Plant is a 1.1-gigawatt (1,100 MW) natural gas power plant located south of Memphis, Tennessee that began generating electricity in 2018. It is operated by Tennessee Valley Authority (TVA).

== Background ==
TVA announced plans that the Allen Fossil Plant would be replaced with a $975 million natural gas plant in order to reduce emissions by 2018 set by a 2011 agreement with the Environmental Protection Agency (EPA). The TVA had plans to utilize greywater from the nearby Maxson Wastewater Treatment Plant, but was determined to be unviable and expensive. Instead, the TVA drilled wells on the Memphis Sand Aquifer to use for the plant's cooling source. During subsequent testing of groundwater and alluvial aquifer in the vicinity of the combined cycle plant, TVA discovered that water contained arsenic and lead which raised concerns that use of the on-site wells may lead to cross-contamination of the Memphis Sand aquifer. As a result, the use of wells on site was suspended and all water for the plant was supplied from the MLGW system. As MLGW could not supply sufficient steady-state water flow to operate the combined cycle plant at full capacity in summer, TVA constructed four water storage tanks with 10 million gallon total capacity. The Allen Combined Cycle Plant went into commercial operations on April 30, 2018.

In addition to the natural gas plant, there is a 1 MW solar farm on site. The facility is also expected to burn biogas produced by the nearby Maxson wastewater treatment and biogas plant.

== See also ==
- List of power stations in Tennessee
- Allam power cycle - a Brayton cycle employing a transcritical CO2 working fluid with an oxy-fuel combustion regime
