= Johnsonville Fossil Plant =

Former coal-fired power station in Humphreys County, Tennessee, United States

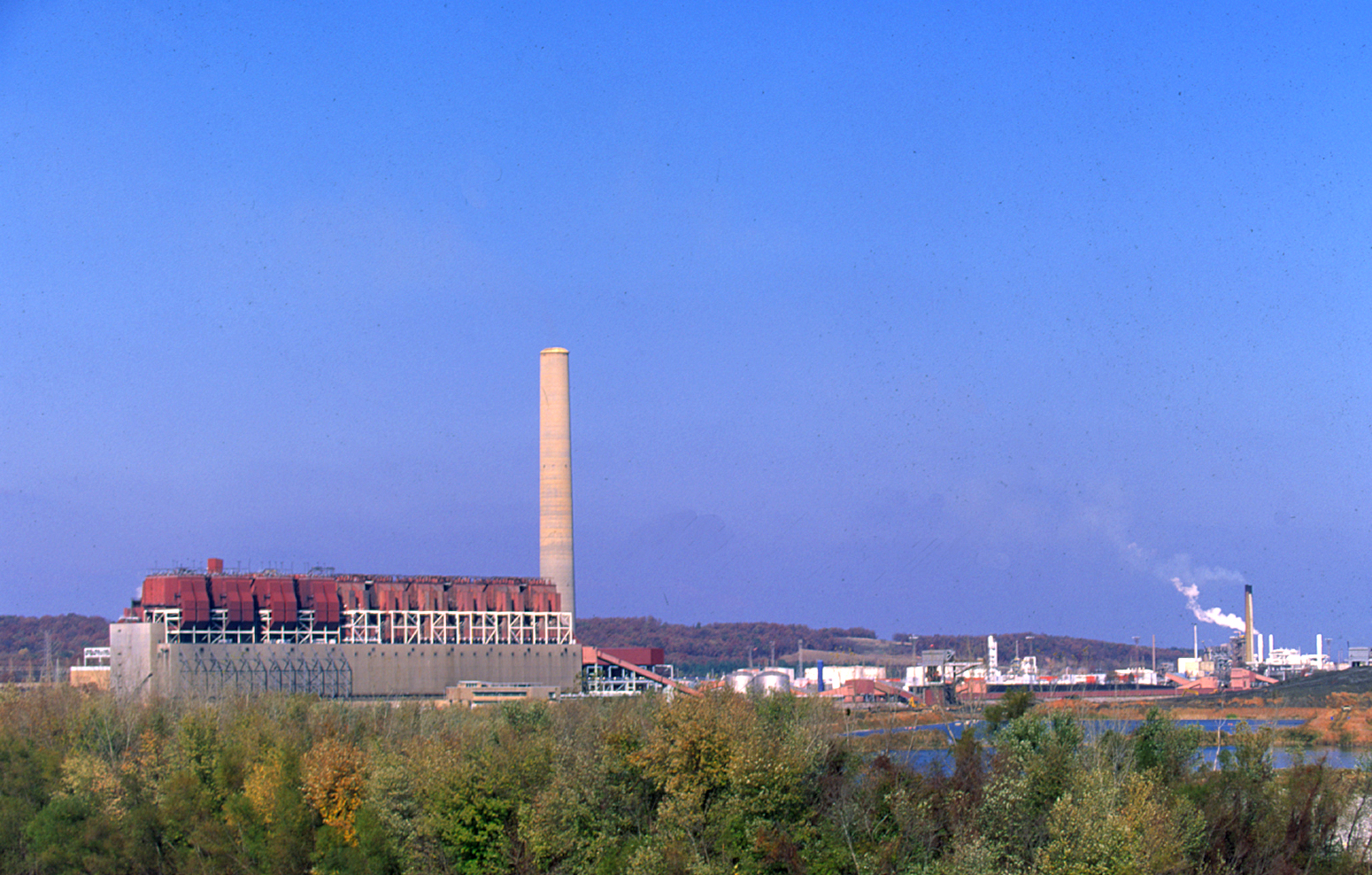
- Former Johnsonville Fossil Plant
- Country: United States
- Location: New Johnsonville, Tennessee
- Coordinates: 36°1′40″N 87°59′12″W
- Status: Decommissioned
- Commission date: Unit 1: 1951; Unit 10: 1959
- Decommission date: Units 5–10: 2015; Units 1–4: 2017
- Owner: Tennessee Valley Authority
- Operator: Tennessee Valley Authority

Thermal power station
- Primary fuel: Coal
- Cooling source: Tennessee River

Power generation
- Units operational: 10
- Nameplate capacity: 1,500 MW

External links
- Commons: Related media on Commons

The Johnsonville Fossil Plant was a 1.5-gigawatt (1,500 MW), coal power plant located in New Johnsonville, Humphreys County, Tennessee, United States. The plant generated electricity from 1951 to 2017. It was operated by the Tennessee Valley Authority (TVA).

== History ==
Construction of the fossil plant began in 1949. The fossil plant started commercial operations at Unit 1 on October 27, 1951. By August 1959, all ten units were operating. Its ten units had a combined operating capacity of 1.5-gigawatts (1,500 MW) with Units 1–4 providing electricity to the nearby Chemours plant. In a 2011 agreement with the Environmental Protection Agency (EPA) to resolve lingering violation complaints in failure to comply with the Clean Air Act, the TVA announced they would shut down the coal units at Johnsonville by 2018. Units 5–10 were idled at Johnsonville in 2012 and were shut down on December 31, 2015. Units 1–4 were shut down on December 31, 2017. The plant was destroyed via a controlled implosion on July 31, 2021.

== See also ==
- List of power stations in Tennessee
