= Bull Run Fossil Plant =

Coal-fired power plant in Anderson County, Tennessee

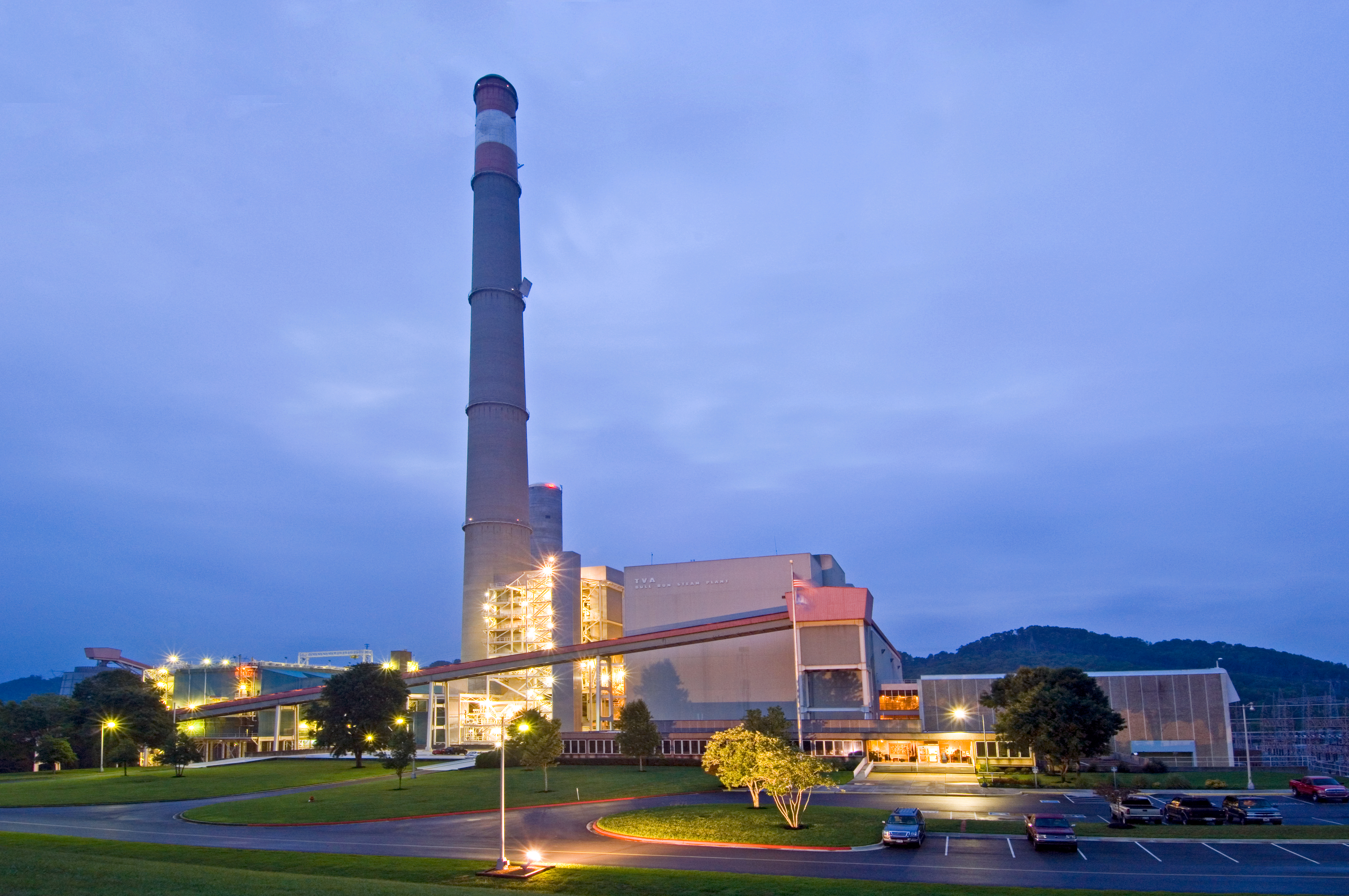
- Country: United States
- Location: Claxton, Anderson County, Tennessee, directly across the Clinch River (Melton Hill Lake) from Oak Ridge
- Coordinates: 36°01′16″N 84°09′22″W
- Status: Decommissioned
- Commission date: June 12, 1967
- Decommission date: December 1, 2023
- Owner: Tennessee Valley Authority (TVA)
- Operator: Tennessee Valley Authority

Thermal power station
- Primary fuel: Coal
- Turbine technology: ABB-CE coal-fired supercritical boiler

Power generation
- Units operational: 1, General Electric cross compound turbine
- Nameplate capacity: 889 MW

External links
- Commons: Related media on Commons

Bull Run Fossil Plant, commonly known as Bull Run Steam Plant, is a retired 889-megawatt (MW), coal-fired electric generating station owned and operated by the Tennessee Valley Authority (TVA). The plant is the only coal-fired power plant ever constructed by TVA with one unit, and was retired on December 1, 2023. In 2025, it was reported that the TVA was exploring plans to build a nuclear fusion plant at the site of the Bull Run Fossil Plant.

== Location ==
Bull Run Plant is located on 750 acres (300 ha), in the Claxton community of Anderson County, Tennessee, on the north bank of Bull Run Creek, directly across the Clinch River (Melton Hill Lake) from Oak Ridge, Tennessee.

== History ==
Construction began on April 2, 1962 and was completed on June 12, 1967, when the plant began commercial operation.

In August 2018, TVA began studying whether to retire Bull Run. On February 14, 2019, the TVA board of directors voted 5-2 to close Bull Run by December 2023, as well as the remaining coal unit at Paradise in Kentucky by December 2020. High operational costs and low capacity factor were factors in their decision. The plant was officially shut down on December 1, 2023. Operations to decommission the former plant were started shortly after the shut down.

The former plant has been discussed as the location of a stellarator prototype developed by fusion energy startup Type One Energy in collaboration with the Tennessee Valley Authority.

The primary smokestack and scrubber stack were demolished on June 28, 2025.

== Units and operating parameters ==
The plant was the only single-generator coal-fired plant in the TVA system. The plant's winter net generating capacity was about 889 MWe. The plant consumed 7,300 short tons (6,600 t) of coal per day, and required 3,200 short tons (2,900 t) of cooling water per hour. Its supercritical boiler operated at a pressure of 3,650 psi (248 atm) and temperature of 1,000 °F (540 °C). When the generator first went into operation, it was the largest in the world measured in terms of the volume of steam produced.

== Environmental impact ==
In 2006, the plant ranked the 70th among the large coal-fired plants in the United States on the list of worst SO_{2} polluters, having emitted 11.92 lb (5.41 kg) of sulfur dioxide per MWh of energy produced (27,987 tons of SO_{2} in 2006 altogether). Since then, a wet limestone scrubber has been installed, which reduced sulfur dioxide emissions by about 95%. In 2015, the plant released 2,510,476 tons of CO_{2}.

== See also ==
- List of power stations in Tennessee
