= Cumberland Fossil Plant =

Coal-fired power plant in Tennessee, United States

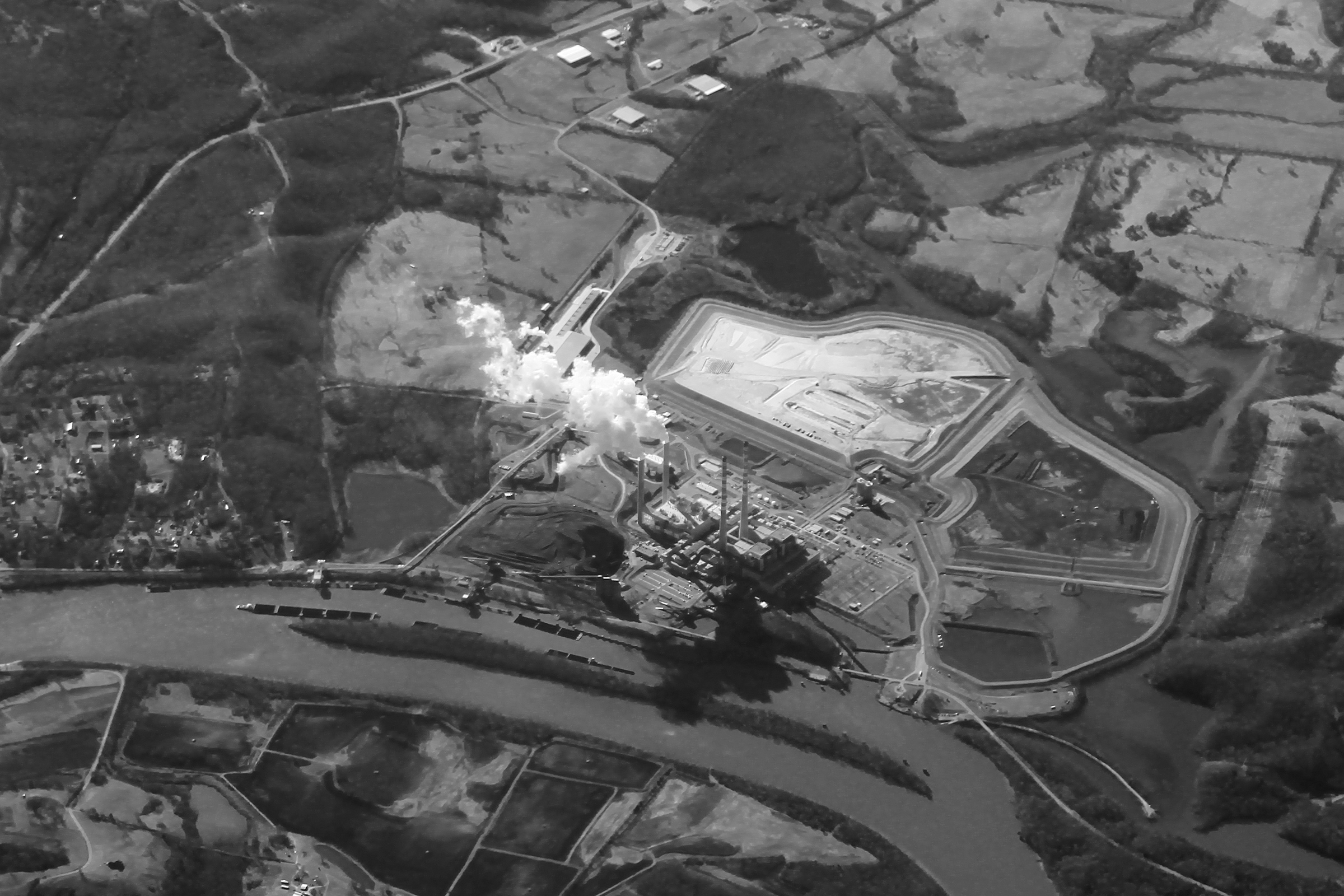
- Country: United States
- Location: Cumberland City, Tennessee
- Coordinates: 36°23′29″N 87°39′17″W
- Status: Operational
- Commission date: 1973
- Decommission date: Unit 1: 2026 (planned); Unit 2: 2028 (planned)
- Owner: Tennessee Valley Authority

Thermal power station
- Primary fuel: Bituminous coal (pulverized)

Power generation
- Nameplate capacity: 2,470 MW

External links
- Commons: Related media on Commons

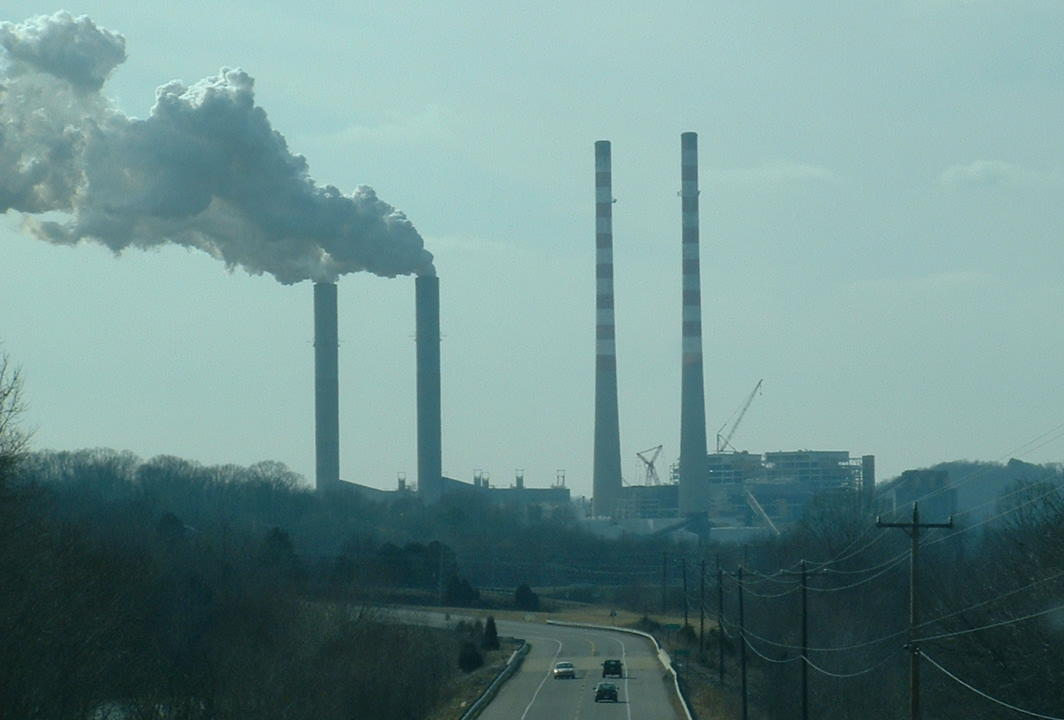
View of the power plant

Cumberland Fossil Plant is a pulverized coal-fired power station located west of Cumberland City, Tennessee, US, on the south bank of Lake Barkley on the Cumberland River. Owned and operated by Tennessee Valley Authority (TVA), it has a gross capacity of 2,470 MW, and is the most powerful power station in Tennessee.

== Description ==
Commissioned in 1968, the Cumberland Fossil Plant contains two identical units, rated at 1.235 GWe gross each, Units 1 and 2 were launched into service in March and November 1973, respectively. In 2004, the two units accounted for almost 12% of TVA's total electricity generation. As of the mid 2010s, however, TVA's Sequoyah Nuclear Plant near Soddy Daisy, Tennessee, with a slightly lower capacity, was generating more power.

The Cumberland Fossil Plant has two of the tallest chimneys in the world at 1,001 feet (305 m), built in 1970. These chimneys are no longer in use, having been replaced with smaller chimneys connected to the scrubbers.

Bituminous coal is delivered by barges along the Cumberland River waterway. The plant consumes about 20,000 tons of coal per day. All of the waste heat is dumped into Cumberland River water.

On January 10, 2023, TVA announced plans to retire the first unit by the end of 2026 and the second by the end of 2028. The plant is tentatively planned to be replaced with a 1,450 MW combined-cycle natural gas generation plant, which has drawn criticism from environmental groups.

== Pollution and releases into environment ==
Toxic release inventory from Cumberland power plant for 2005. All quantities are in pounds.
Pollutant	Air	Water	Land	Offsite disposal	Total
Antimony compounds	39	178	8,947	0	9,164
Arsenic compounds	182	119	46,096	0	46,397
Barium compounds	142	0	279,200	25	279,367
Beryllium compounds	10	0	9,952	1	9,963
Cadmium compounds					
Chromium compounds	368	142	87,420	7	87,937
Cobalt compounds	63	89	19,887	1	20,040
Copper compounds	286	6,798	64,120	3	71,207
Lead compounds	253	0	59,122	3	59,378
Manganese compounds	558	33,864	177,130	18	211,570
Mercury compounds	240	0	346	0	586
Nickel compounds	516	2,504	98,180	6	101,206
Selenium compounds	2,501	2,075	6,573	0	11,149
Silver compounds					
Thallium compounds	36	0	30,200	2	30,239
Vanadium compounds	290	0	191,560	13	191,864
Zinc compounds	2,006	2,447	248,070	12	252,534
Hydrochloric acid (aerosol)	340,006	0	0	0	340,006
Hydrogen fluoride	72,006	0	0	0	72,006
Sulfuric acid (aerosol)	8,793,606	0	0	0	8,793,606
Benzo[ghi]perylene	0.21	0	0.65	0	0.87
Dioxins	0.008	0	0	0	0.008
Polycyclic aromatic compounds	49.8	0	59.2	0.0	109.0
Naphthalene	100	0	0	0	100
Ammonia	3,640	316	0	0	3,956
Nitrate compounds	0	128,879	0	0	132,407

== Environmental protection measures ==
To reduce sulfur dioxide (SO_{2}) emissions, both units at Cumberland use wet limestone scrubbers. To reduce nitrogen oxides (NO_{x}), the units use low-NO_{x} burners as well as selective catalytic reduction systems, which were completed in 2004.

== See also ==
- List of power stations in Tennessee
- List of the largest coal power stations in the United States
