= Gallatin Fossil Plant =

Coal and gas-fired power plant in Gallatin, Tennessee, United States

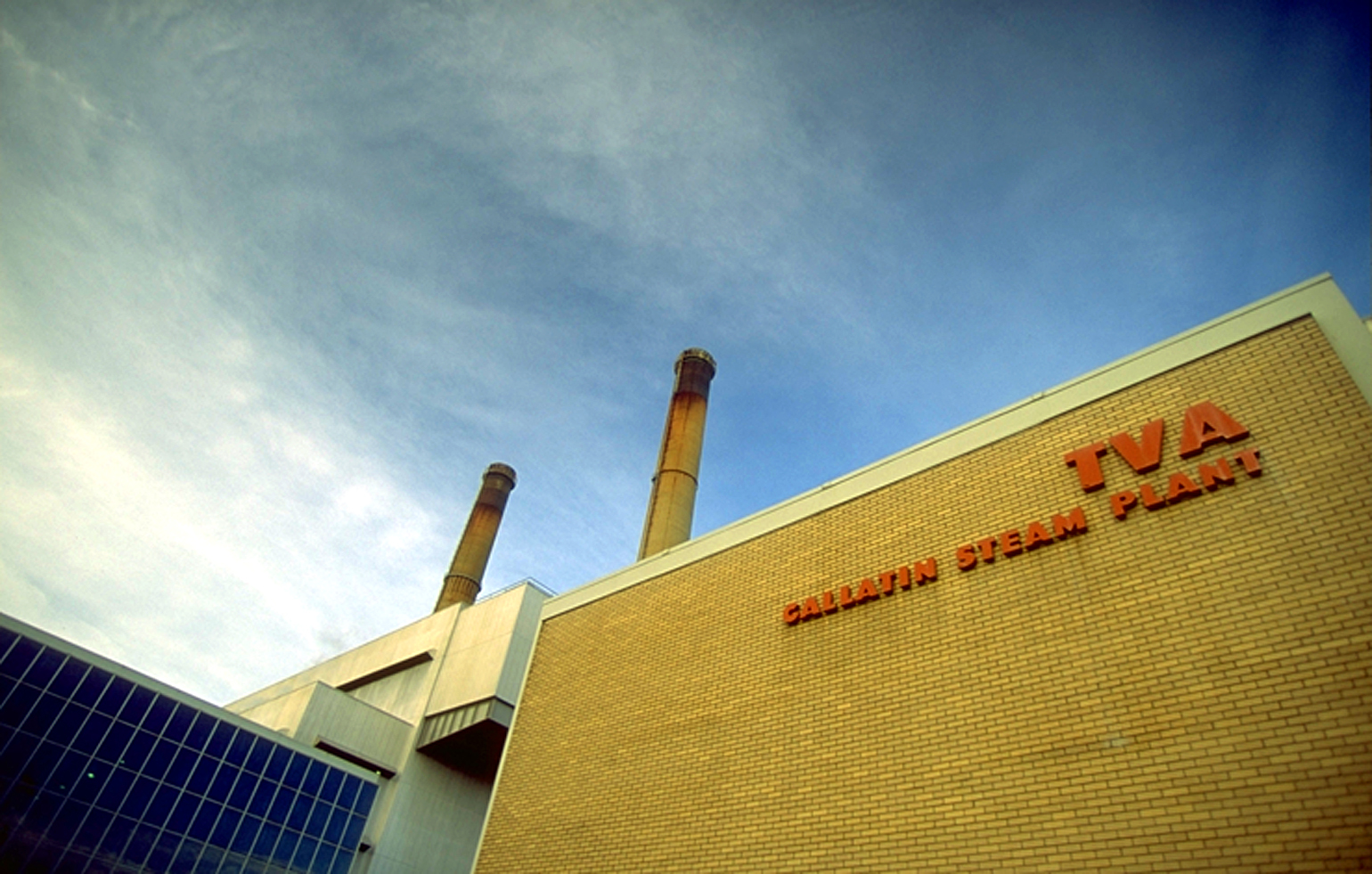
- Gallatin Fossil Plant
- Country: United States
- Location: Gallatin, Tennessee
- Coordinates: 36°18′53″N 86°24′01″W
- Status: Operational
- Commission date: Coal units Unit 1: 1956; Unit 2: 1957; Units 3–4: 1959; Natural gas units Units 1-4: 1975; Units 5-8: 2000
- Construction cost: Coal units $143,377,000 (equivalent to $1,263,409,000 in 2024)
- Owner: Tennessee Valley Authority
- Operator: Tennessee Valley Authority

Thermal power station
- Primary fuel: Coal, natural gas

Power generation
- Nameplate capacity: 976 MW (coal); 600 MW (natural gas)

The Gallatin Fossil Plant is a coal and natural gas-fired power plant near Gallatin, Tennessee operated by the Tennessee Valley Authority (TVA). The plant was originally entirely a coal-fired plant, constructed in the 1950s, and natural gas units were added later.

== Description ==
The Gallatin Fossil Plant is located on 1,950 acres of land on the Cumberland River The plant consists of four coal-fired units, with a combined generating capacity of 976 net megawatts (MW). The plant contains four Westinghouse and four GE combustion turbine units, with a combined capacity of 600 MW net, and these units, located adjacent to the coal units, are sometimes referred to separately from the coal units as the Gallatin Combustion Turbine Plant.

== History ==
Gallatin was originally entirely a coal-fired plant. Groundbreaking for the plant occurred on May 11, 1953. Unit One began operation on November 8, 1956, Unit Two on June 27, 1957, Unit Three on May 22, 1959, and Unit Four on August 9, 1959. The first four gas-fired units were added in 1975, and the last four in 2000. Electrostatic precipitators were first installed on the plant in 1970. In 2019, TVA agreed to remove 12 million tons of coal ash at a cost of $640 million during 20 years.
