= John Sevier Fossil Plant =

Coal-fired power plant in Tennessee, United States

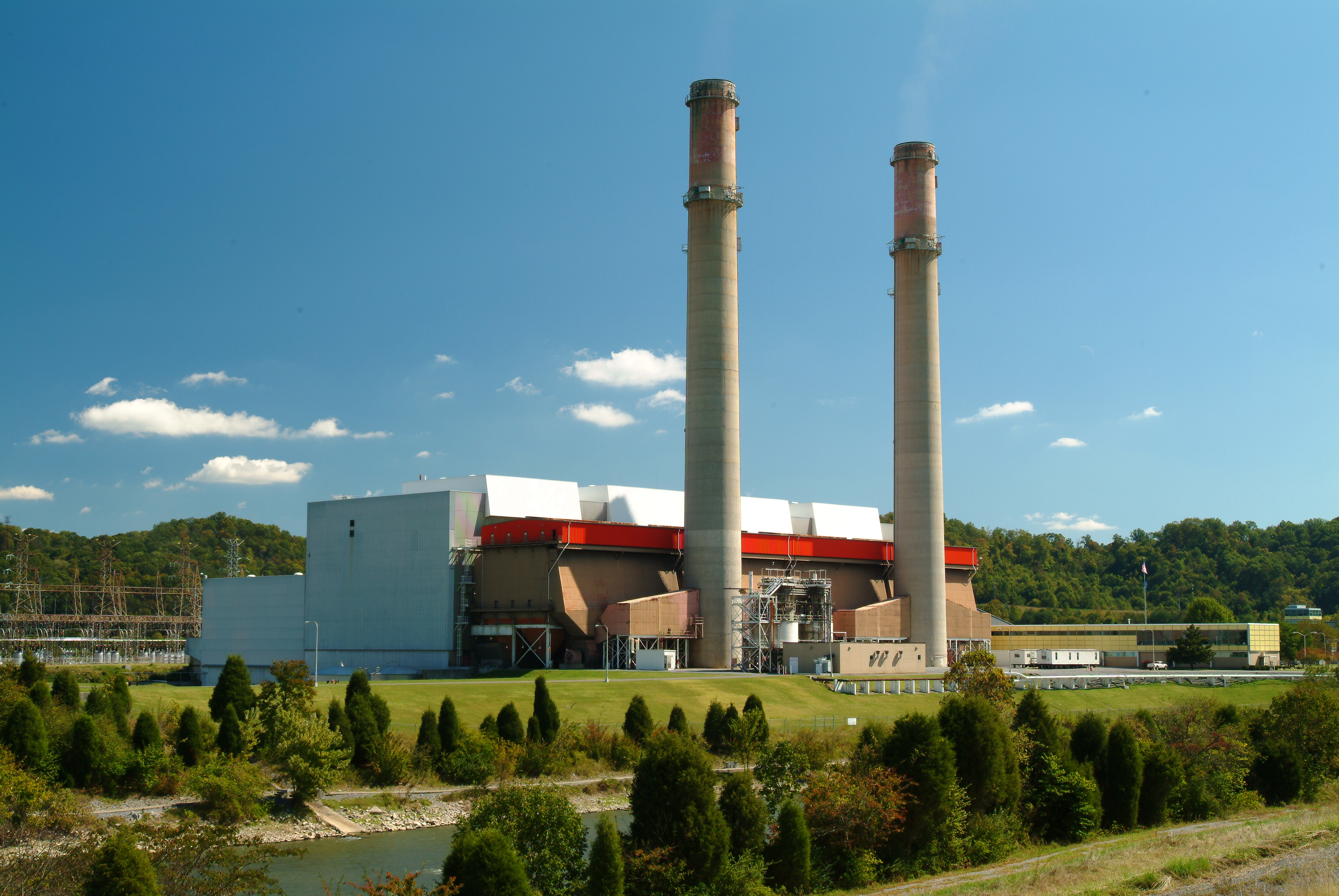
- John Sevier Fossil Plant
- Country: United States
- Location: Hawkins County, Tennessee, near Rogersville
- Coordinates: 36°22′37″N 82°57′48″W
- Status: Decommissioned
- Commission date: Unit 1: 1955; Unit 2: 1955; Unit 3: 1956; Unit 4: 1957
- Decommission date: Units 1-4: 2012
- Owner: Tennessee Valley Authority

Thermal power station
- Primary fuel: Bituminous coal
- Cooling source: Holston River

Power generation
- Units decommissioned: 4
- Nameplate capacity: 880 MW

External links
- Commons: Related media on Commons

John Sevier Fossil Plant, commonly known as John Sevier Steam Plant, was a 0.88-gigawatt (880 MW) coal-fired power plant located in Hawkins County, Tennessee, south of Rogersville on the shore of the Holston River. It was operated by the Tennessee Valley Authority.

It was decommissioned in 2012, and replaced by a combined-cycle natural gas plant in the same year. The plant and its two 350 foot tall smokestacks were demolished from 2015 to 2017.
