= Watts Bar Steam Plant =

Former coal-fired power plant in Rhea County, Tennessee

- Country: United States
- Location: Rhea County, Tennessee
- Coordinates: 35°36′38″N 84°46′53″W
- Status: Decommissioned
- Commission date: 1942
- Decommission date: 1982
- Owner: Tennessee Valley Authority
- Operator: Tennessee Valley Authority

Thermal power station
- Primary fuel: Coal
- Cooling source: Tennessee River

Power generation
- Nameplate capacity: 267 MW

Watts Bar Steam Plant was a 267-megawatt (MW), coal power plant operated by the Tennessee Valley Authority (TVA) located in Rhea County, Tennessee, near the present site of Watts Bar Nuclear Plant and Watts Bar Dam. The plant was the first coal-fired power plant constructed by TVA.

== Description ==
The Watts Bar Steam Plant consisted of four units listed as units A, B, C, and D, with a combined generating capacity of 267 megawatts. The plant was the first coal-fired plant constructed by TVA. The interior of the plant contained a vantage point for people to view the turbine room and a spacious overlook balcony, which was also included at future plants.

== History ==
The Watts Bar Steam Plant was authorized for construction on July 31, 1940, and construction began just one week later. The plant was initially planned as part of an effort to provide power to the defense industry, and originally only two units with a capacity of 60 MWe each were planned, but a third and fourth were added in April and December 1941, respectively. The first unit at the Watts Bar Steam Plant, Unit B began operations on March 16, 1942, one month after Watts Bar Dam. Unit A began operations later that year, and unit C began operation in 1943 and unit D in 1945. As TVA's first coal plant, it was intended to be a blueprint for future power plants. The plant was shut down between 1957 and 1972 and during this time precipitators were installed to meet emissions regulations.

In 1973, construction began nearby on the two units of Watts Bar Nuclear Plant. The Watts Bar Steam Plant was retired in 1982, and demolished in 2011. The units at the nuclear plant, of which construction had been suspended in 1985, began operations in 1996, and 2016, respectively, the two newest nuclear power units to come online in the United States.

== See also ==
- List of power stations in Tennessee
- Watts Bar Dam
- Watts Bar Nuclear Plant
