= Claxton, Anderson County, Tennessee =

Claxton
- Unincorporated community
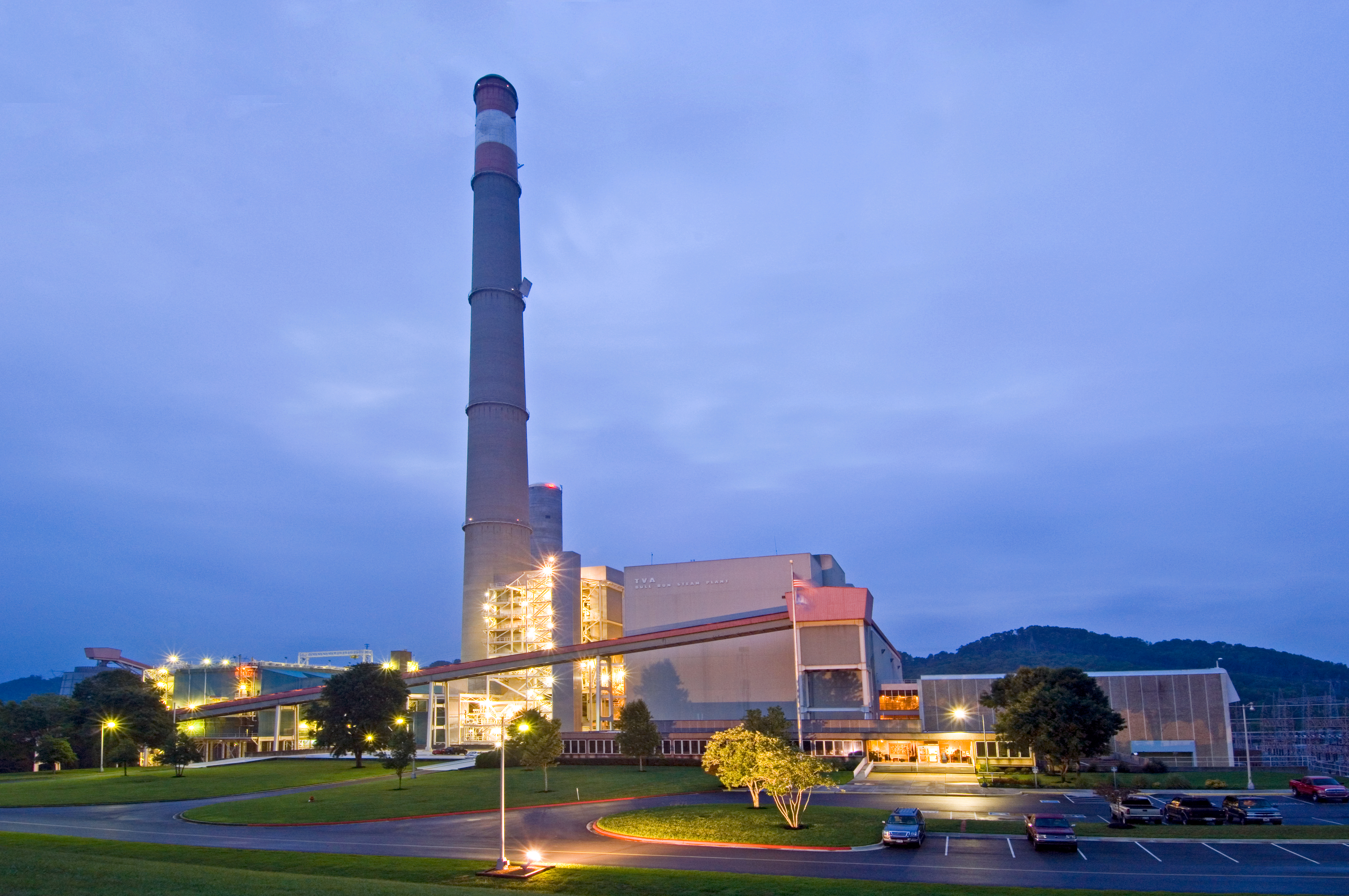
- Bull Run Fossil Plant

- Location within the state of Tennessee Claxton (the United States)
- Coordinates: 36°02′30″N 84°06′36″W
- Country: United States
- State: Tennessee
- County: Anderson
- Elevation: 850 ft (260 m)
- Time zone: UTC−5 (Eastern (EST))
  - Summer (DST): UTC−4 (EDT)
- ZIP Codes: 37716, 37849
- GNIS feature ID: 1314851

Claxton is an unincorporated community in Anderson County in the U.S. state of Tennessee.

The name "Claxton" is generally applied to the unincorporated part of Anderson County south of the city of Clinton and northeast of the city of Oak Ridge, centered on the intersection of Clinton Highway (U.S. Route 25W and State Route 9) with State Route 170 (Edgemoor Road and Raccoon Valley Road). Claxton is bounded on the east and south by the Knox County line. Claxton does not have a post office, and is serviced by the Clinton and Powell zip codes, 37716 and 37849 respectively.

The Claxton Elementary School, a public school operated by Anderson County Schools, is located at the intersection of Edgemoor Road and Clinton Highway. A new Claxton Elementary School is currently being built on Clinton Hwy across from the current one. The Tennessee Valley Authority Bull Run Fossil Plant is at the edge of Claxton, directly across the Clinch River from Oak Ridge.

A playground and youth sports field in Claxton was built using radioactive coal ash waste from the Bull Run Fossil Plant. The playground and field have been closed and Anderson County is in the planning stages of a new park.
