= Memphis Light, Gas and Water =

Municipal public utility in Tennessee

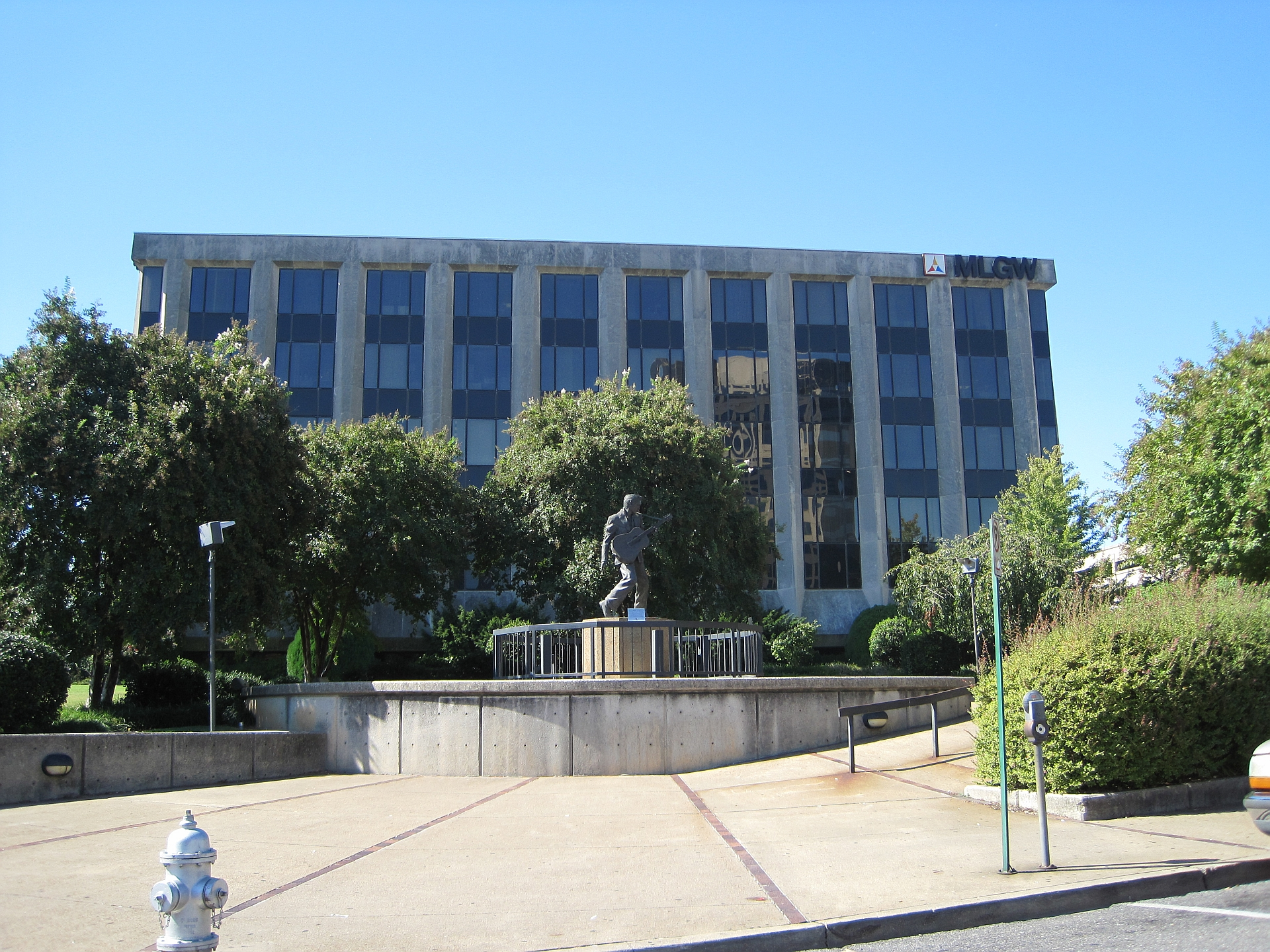
- The David F. Hansen Administration Building, the administrative offices for the MLGW
- Type: Municipal public utility
- Founded: 1939; 87 years ago
- Area served: Memphis and Shelby County
- Owner: City of Memphis
- Website: Official website

The Memphis Light Gas and Water Division (MLGW) is a municipal public utility serving the city of Memphis and Shelby County, Tennessee, United States.

== Description ==
MLGW is the largest three-service municipal utility in the U.S., with more than 420,000 customers. It is owned by the City of Memphis. Since 1939, MLGW has provided electricity, natural gas, and water service for residents of Memphis and Shelby County.

MLGW is supplied with electricity by the Tennessee Valley Authority (TVA), a federal agency that sells electricity on a nonprofit basis to its distributors. MLGW is TVA's largest customer, representing 11 percent of TVA's total load. There are over 428,000 electric customers.

Natural gas is the most common means of residential heating in the MLGW service area. MLGW provides natural gas to more than 313,000 customers in Shelby County.

While some utilities obtain drinking water from surface lakes or rivers, MLGW supplies water from the Memphis aquifer beneath Shelby County. It contains more than 100 trillion gallons of water that are more than 2,000 years old. MLGW operates one of the largest artesian well systems in the world consisting of 10 water pumping stations and more than 175 wells, delivering water to more than 253,000 customers.

== History ==
The city purchased a private water system in 1902 and operated it as the Memphis Artesian Water Department. The city later purchased the local portion of the electrical system of the Memphis Power and Light Company in 1939 for $15 million and formed the MLGW Division.

From 1937 to 1970, the department was headquartered at the historic Scimitar Building at Madison Avenue and Third Street.

== See also ==
- United Gas Pipe Line Co. v. Memphis Light, Gas, and Water Division, a 1958 Supreme Court decision
