= New Johnsonville, Tennessee =

- City
- Flag
- Motto: "Friendly people, working together"
- Location in Humphreys County, Tennessee
- Coordinates: 36°1′16″N 87°58′1″W
- Country: United States
- State: Tennessee
- County: Humphreys
- Incorporated: 1949

Area
  - Total: 6.88 sq mi (17.83 km^{2})
  - Land: 5.15 sq mi (13.33 km^{2})
  - Water: 1.74 sq mi (4.50 km^{2})
- Elevation: 436 ft (133 m)

Population (2020)
  - Total: 1,804
  - Density: 350.6/sq mi (135.38/km^{2})
- Time zone: UTC-6 (Central (CST))
  - Summer (DST): UTC-5 (CDT)
- ZIP code: 37134
- Area code: 931
- FIPS code: 47-52820
- Website: www.cityofnewjville.com

New Johnsonville is a city in Humphreys County, Tennessee, United States. As of the 2020 census, New Johnsonville had a population of 1,804.

== History ==
The history of New Johnsonville is rooted in the town of Johnsonville, which was once situated on the Tennessee River about 3 miles (5 km) downstream. Johnsonville, named for Andrew Johnson, was most notably the site of the Battle of Johnsonville during the Civil War. Johnsonville was inundated by the Tennessee Valley Authority's construction of Kentucky Dam in 1944, and many of its residents moved to the current site of New Johnsonville, which was incorporated in 1949.

== Geography ==
New Johnsonville is located along the western border of Humphreys County at 36°1′9″N 87°58′3″W (36.019087, -87.967619). It is on the east side of Kentucky Lake on the Tennessee River. U.S. Route 70 passes through the city, leading northeast 12 miles (19 km) to Waverly, the Humphreys county seat, and west 8 miles (13 km) to Camden.

According to the United States Census Bureau, the city has a total area of 7.1 square miles (18.3 km^{2}), of which 5.3 square miles (13.7 km^{2}) are land and 1.8 square miles (4.6 km^{2}), or 25.07%, are water.

== Demographics ==
Historical population
Census	Pop.	Note	%±
1960	559		—
1970	970		73.5%
1980	1,824		88.0%
1990	1,643		−9.9%
2000	1,905		15.9%
2010	1,951		2.4%
2020	1,804		−7.5%

=== 2020 census ===
As of the 2020 census, there was a population of 1,804, with 716 households and 533 families residing in the city.

The median age was 40.7 years. 22.8% of residents were under the age of 18 and 18.5% of residents were 65 years of age or older. For every 100 females there were 97.4 males, and for every 100 females age 18 and over there were 92.9 males age 18 and over.

There were 716 households in New Johnsonville, of which 33.8% had children under the age of 18 living in them. Of all households, 55.0% were married-couple households, 15.5% were households with a male householder and no spouse or partner present, and 24.6% were households with a female householder and no spouse or partner present. About 24.0% of all households were made up of individuals and 11.4% had someone living alone who was 65 years of age or older.

There were 790 housing units, of which 9.4% were vacant. The homeowner vacancy rate was 1.1% and the rental vacancy rate was 14.2%.

0.0% of residents lived in urban areas, while 100.0% lived in rural areas.

Racial composition as of the 2020 census
Race	Number	Percent
White	1,616	89.6%
Black or African American	27	1.5%
American Indian and Alaska Native	8	0.4%
Asian	9	0.5%
Native Hawaiian and Other Pacific Islander	0	0.0%
Some other race	16	0.9%
Two or more races	128	7.1%
Hispanic or Latino (of any race)	39	2.2%

=== 2000 census ===
As of the census of 2000, there was a population of 1,905, with 747 households and 578 families residing in the city. The population density was 340.6 inhabitants per square mile (131.5/km^{2}). There were 861 housing units at an average density of 154.0 per square mile (59.5/km^{2}). The racial makeup of the city was 97.43% White, 1.26% African American, 0.10% Native American, 0.31% Asian, 0.10% from other races, and 0.79% from two or more races. 0.52% of the population were Hispanic or Latino of any race.

There were 747 households, out of which 32.5% had children under the age of 18 living with them, 65.6% were married couples living together, 8.8% had a female householder with no husband present, and 22.6% were non-families. 19.4% of all households were made up of individuals, and 6.7% had someone living alone who was 65 years of age or older. The average household size was 2.55 and the average family size was 2.89.

In the city the population was spread out, with 24.8% under the age of 18, 6.9% from 18 to 24, 28.3% from 25 to 44, 27.7% from 45 to 64, and 12.2% who were 65 years of age or older. The median age was 40 years. For every 100 females, there were 94.2 males. For every 100 females age 18 and over, there were 95.9 males.

The median income for a household in the city was $46,500, and the median income for a family was $51,406. Males had a median income of $41,161 versus $22,813 for females. The per capita income for the city was $20,756. 8.8% of the population and 6.7% of families were below the poverty line. Out of the total population, 12.8% of those under the age of 18 and 5.2% of those 65 and older were living below the poverty line.

== Economy ==
New Johnsonville is the location of the Johnsonville Combustion Turbine Plant, formerly known as the Johnsonville Fossil Plant which operated from 1951 to 2017. The plant generated electricity for the region and produces steam for the nearby Chemours plant which makes 25% of America's titanium oxide supply.

== Recreation ==
Johnsonville State Historic Park is located 4 miles (6 km) north of the town.
