= Watts Bar Nuclear Plant =

Nuclear power plant in Rhea County, Tennessee

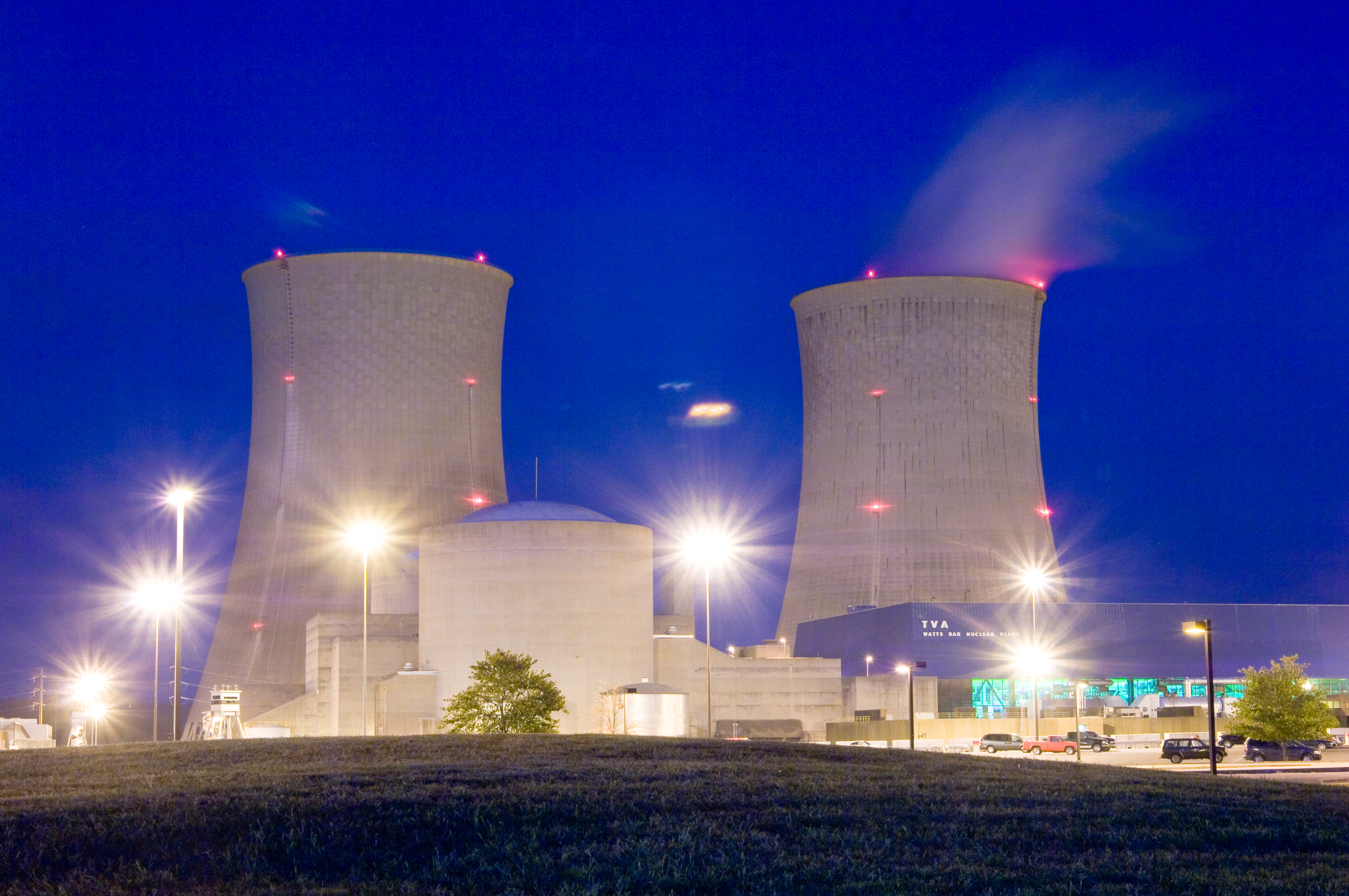
- Watts Bar Nuclear Power Plant Units 1 & 2 cooling towers and containment buildings.
- Country: United States
- Location: Rhea County, near Spring City, Tennessee
- Coordinates: 35°36′10″N 84°47′22″W
- Status: Operational
- Construction began: Unit 1: July 20, 1973; Unit 2: September 1, 1973 (Note: Although Unit 2 originally began construction on September 1, 1973, construction was halted on September 17, 1985 due to regulatory and economic factors. Construction was subsequently resumed on October 15, 2007, and the plant was completed on October 19, 2016, 43 years after construction first started (although the plant was only under active construction for 21 of those years).)
- Commission date: Unit 1: May 27, 1996; Unit 2: October 19, 2016
- Construction cost: More than $12 billion
- Owner: Tennessee Valley Authority
- Operator: Tennessee Valley Authority

Nuclear power station
- Reactor type: PWR
- Reactor supplier: Westinghouse
- Cooling towers: 2 × Natural Draft
- Cooling source: Tennessee River
- Thermal capacity: 1 × 3459 MW_{th} 1 × 3411 MW_{th}

Power generation
- Units operational: 1 × 1167 MW; 1 × 1165 MW
- Make and model: WH 4-loop (ICECND)
- Nameplate capacity: 2332 MW
- Capacity factor: 68.10% (2017); 73.45% (lifetime)
- Annual net output: 16,808 GWh (2022)

External links
- Website: www.tva.gov/Energy/Our-Power-System/Nuclear/Watts-Bar-Nuclear-Plant
- Commons: Related media on Commons

The Watts Bar Nuclear Plant is a Tennessee Valley Authority (TVA) nuclear reactor pair used for electric power generation. It is located on a 1,770-acre (7.2 km^{2}) site in Rhea County, Tennessee, near Spring City, between Chattanooga and Knoxville. Watts Bar supplies enough electricity for about 1.2 million households in the Tennessee Valley.

Construction of the plant, which has two Westinghouse pressurized water reactor units, began in 1973, was suspended in 1985, and resumed in 1992. Unit 1 was completed in 1996, and Unit 2 was completed in 2015. Unit 1 has a winter net dependable generating capacity of 1,167 megawatts. Unit 2 has a capacity of 1,165 megawatts. Unit 2 was the first of three new power reactors to enter service in the 21st century in the United States, followed by Vogtle Electric Generating Plant Units 3 and 4.

== Unit 1 ==
Construction on Unit 1 began on January 23, 1973, and suffered from many delays. After construction was halted on both units in 1985, construction resumed on Unit 1 in 1992. Criticality was first achieved on January 1, 1996, and commercial operation began on May 5, 1996.

In the early 2000s, the four original steam generator units were replaced with units made from Inconel 690 which is more resistant to stress corrosion cracking.

== Unit 2 ==
Unit 2 construction started in 1972. Unit 2 was 60% complete when construction on both units was stopped in 1985 due in part to a projected decrease in power demand. On August 1, 2007, the Tennessee Valley Authority (TVA) board approved completion of Unit 2, and construction resumed on October 15. The project was expected to cost $2.5 billion and employ around 2,300 contractor workers. Once finished, it was expected to employ 250 people in permanent jobs. The final cost of the plant is estimated at $6.1 billion.

A year after the 2011 Tōhoku earthquake and tsunami and subsequent Fukushima Daiichi nuclear disaster, the Nuclear Regulatory Commission (NRC) issued nine orders to improve safety at domestic plants. Two changes applied to Watts Bar Unit 2 and required design modifications: "Mitigation Strategies Order" and "Spent Fuel Pool Instrumentation Order". In February 2012, TVA said the design modifications to Watts Bar 2 were partially responsible for the project running over budget and behind schedule. The second unit costs a total of $4.7 billion bringing the total costs of the two-unit plant to more than $12 billion. It will likely be the last Generation II reactor to be completed in the US.

TVA declared construction substantially complete in August 2015 and requested that NRC staff proceed with the final licensing review; on October 22, the NRC approved a 40-year operating license for Unit 2, marking the formal end of construction and allowing for the installation of nuclear fuel and subsequent testing. On December 15, 2015, TVA announced that the reactor was fully loaded with fuel and ready for criticality and power ascension tests. In March 2016, the NRC described the project as a "chilled work environment," where employees are reluctant to raise safety concerns for fear of retribution.

On May 23, 2016, initial criticality was achieved. Commercial operation began in October 2016. On October 19, 2016, Watts Bar 2 became the first United States reactor to enter commercial operation since Unit 1 in 1996. Due to failures in its condenser, TVA took it offline on March 23, 2017. The condenser, which was installed during the original construction phase of the plant in the 1970s, suffered a structural failure in one of its sections. On August 1, 2017, the unit was restarted after four months of repairs to the condenser.

In 2022, the four original steam generator units installed in the 1970s on Unit 2 were replaced with units made from Inconel 690 which is more resistant to stress corrosion cracking and expected to last the life of the plant. Replacing the units involved cutting two large holes in the containment building. Because of radioactive contamination, the old units will be kept until the plant is decommissioned.

== Electricity production ==
Generation (MWh) of Watts Bar Nuclear Plant
Year	Jan	Feb	Mar	Apr	May	Jun	Jul	Aug	Sep	Oct	Nov	Dec	Annual (Total)
2001	865,401	785,394	867,441	831,506	854,829	781,099	546,540	832,025	752,854	861,068	832,257	816,161	9,626,575
2002	867,654	666,737	247,153	828,559	668,949	812,577	786,082	831,704	811,209	854,034	840,231	863,464	9,078,353
2003	874,381	788,422	682,375	830,918	850,445	815,140	830,671	771,811	145,510	251,039	839,063	869,036	8,548,811
2004	790,787	812,896	861,019	829,429	844,969	809,214	831,329	830,935	708,344	846,240	828,868	862,873	9,856,903
2005	856,865	574,589	-12,464	787,969	850,040	806,093	827,508	822,971	760,234	845,165	827,117	857,868	8,803,955
2006	863,241	712,653	840,779	819,625	806,229	104,495	808,856	696,280	255,819	-6,120	-12,838	789,079	6,678,098
2007	847,063	794,789	842,491	842,160	860,541	817,964	842,218	822,564	813,716	852,528	841,477	872,175	10,049,686
2008	873,261	261,900	120,189	837,789	581,768	790,206	837,210	563,329	666,098	860,272	844,163	876,124	8,112,309
2009	878,273	791,352	831,643	840,996	857,449	815,615	841,810	838,200	534,880	272,182	832,706	872,359	9,207,465
2010	831,615	793,007	872,123	838,259	684,320	813,889	837,006	799,849	817,744	861,066	715,384	874,195	9,738,457
2011	875,658	786,916	791,302	57,454	116,536	798,773	833,360	824,327	819,858	629,340	836,448	861,012	8,230,984
2012	867,879	813,000	860,501	829,765	845,534	811,824	830,376	756,716	228,900	7,118	834,875	829,983	8,516,471
2013	866,265	782,801	864,022	827,505	845,863	744,031	833,711	837,231	813,145	853,805	840,348	859,076	9,967,803
2014	872,923	785,077	633,303	-12,074	738,213	810,194	754,183	830,449	809,351	848,741	838,751	868,504	8,777,615
2015	870,146	566,898	783,904	822,440	843,297	794,445	802,791	822,161	488,794	186,565	608,004	859,705	8,449,150
2016	863,426	800,168	706,793	800,663	818,177	762,692	1,034,064	906,079	792,838	1,422,247	1,664,235	1,764,096	12,335,478
2017	1,758,293	1,589,981	1,027,929	-22,258	569,823	773,659	825,538	1,512,310	1,677,002	1,626,640	847,376	1,389,910	13,576,203
2018	1,782,004	1,592,296	1,771,056	1,611,462	1,684,194	1,393,973	1,657,810	1,512,727	1,186,680	849,587	1,657,365	1,773,479	18,472,633
2019	1,776,869	1,433,694	1,762,683	1,172,709	1,138,695	1,649,612	1,683,870	1,686,646	786,465	1,089,909	1,711,324	1,763,310	17,655,786
2020	1,763,054	1,593,092	1,675,291	1,685,834	419,862	1,426,193	1,654,860	1,662,790	1,551,432	1,399,109	1,077,497	1,679,992	17,589,006
2021	1,685,672	1,520,935	1,599,308	1,592,636	1,621,629	1,541,734	1,584,771	1,582,295	1,044,650	1,527,420	812,929	1,561,616	17,675,595
2022	1,732,923	1,555,921	825,225	833,189	840,043	797,974	1,630,675	1,693,139	1,663,035	1,719,271	1,744,557	1,772,149	16,808,101
2023	1,755,010	1,592,494	1,754,083	1,229,289	1,333,705	1,588,153	1,692,005	1,639,538	1,649,149	1,730,390	969,582	1,776,443	18,709,841
2024	1,680,679	1,657,142	1,670,418	1,686,421	1,603,629	1,650,447	1,348,512	1,697,947	1,656,493	1,733,421	877,671	1,495,903	18,758,683
2025	1,370,152	796,301	871,784	275,390	1,015,794	1,669,888	1,597,396	1,726,236	1,681,340	1,760,300	1,736,380	1,772,334	16,273,295
2026	1,801,438	1,630,902	1,773,204	1,321,504	1,204,260	1,685,549	1,718,178	1,709,981					--

== Tritium production ==
The NRC operating license for Watts Bar was modified in September 2002 to allow irradiation of tritium-producing burnable absorber rods at Watts Bar to produce tritium for the U.S. Department of Energy's (DOE's) National Nuclear Security Administration in order to maintain the viability of America's nuclear weapons. Tritium, the fusion fuel in nuclear weapons, has a half-life of 12.3 years, which means it decays at 5.5% per year and must be renewed. The Watts Bar license amendment permits TVA to irradiate up to approximately 2,000 tritium-producing rods in the Watts Bar reactor.

TVA began irradiating tritium-producing rods at Unit 1 in the fall of 2003. TVA removed these rods from the reactor in the spring of 2005. DOE successfully shipped them to its tritium extraction facility at Savannah River Site in South Carolina. DOE reimburses TVA for the cost of providing the irradiation services and also pays TVA a fee for each tritium-producing rod that is irradiated. During the times the reactor does this, it must be fuelled with "unobligated" uranium, (uranium that is not legally or contractually restricted to peaceful use only, as most commercial reactor uranium is). Technology and equipment as well as the fuel used to produce it must be of U.S. origin.

== Surrounding population ==
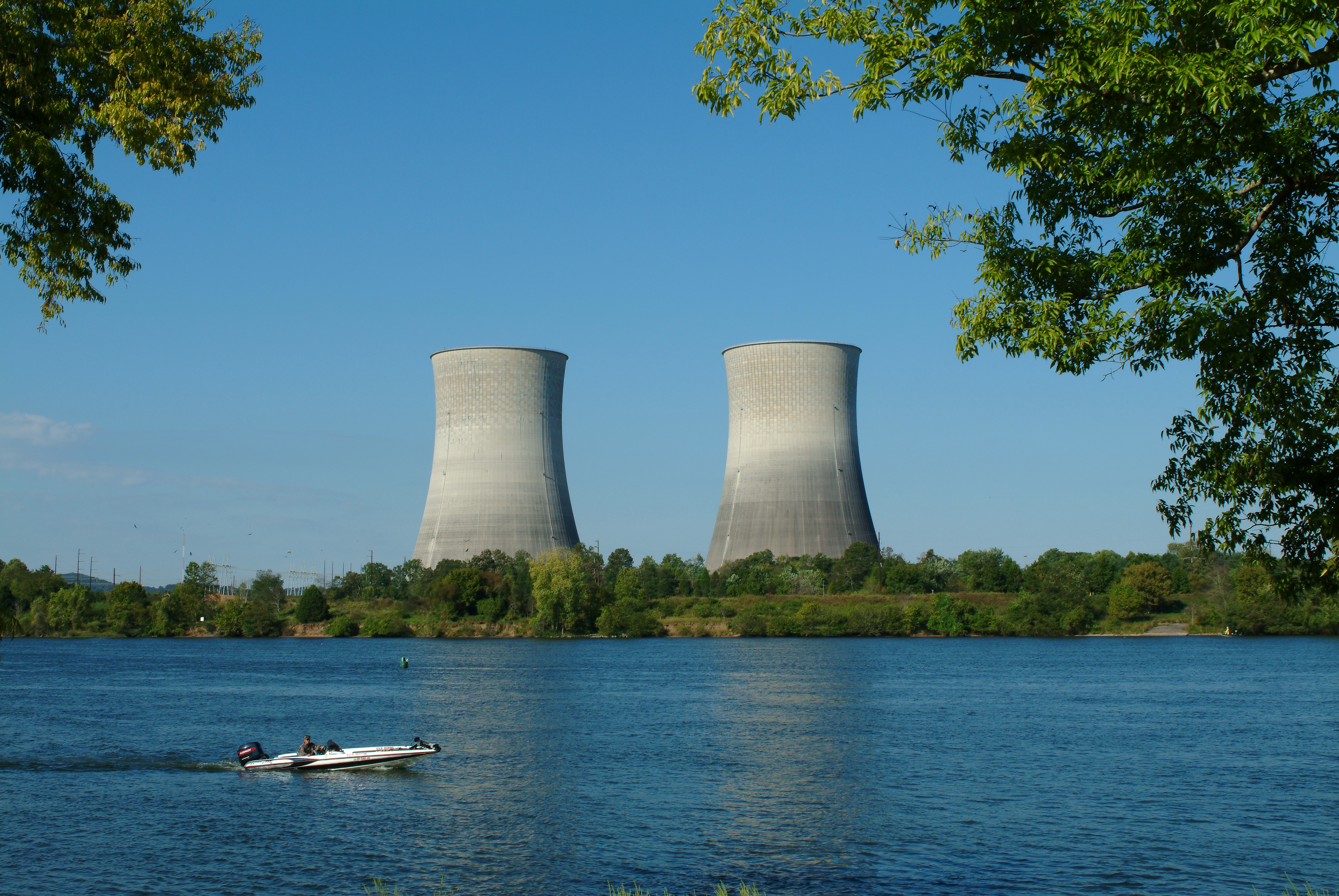
Watts Bar's cooling towers, with the Tennessee River in the foreground

The NRC defines two emergency planning zones around nuclear power plants: a plume exposure pathway zone with a radius of 10 miles (16 km), concerned primarily with exposure to, and inhalation of, airborne radioactive contamination, and an ingestion pathway zone of about 50 miles (80 km), concerned primarily with ingestion of food and liquid contaminated by radioactivity.

The 2010 U.S. population within 10 miles (16 km) of Watts Bar was 18,452, an increase of 4.1 percent in a decade, according to an analysis of U.S. Census data for msnbc.com. The 2010 U.S. population within 50 miles (80 km) was 1,186,648, an increase of 12.8 percent since 2000.

== Seismic risk ==
The NRC's estimate of the risk each year of an earthquake intense enough to cause core damage to the reactor at Watts Bar was 1 in 27,778, according to an NRC study published in August 2010. The 2018 Southern Appalachian earthquake's epicenter was located two miles (3.2 km) east of the facility. The TVA reported that their facilities are designed to withstand seismic events and were not impacted by the earthquake, but personnel would conduct further inspections as a precaution.

== See also ==
- Watts Bar Dam
- Watts Bar Steam Plant
- List of the largest nuclear power stations in the United States
- List of power stations in Tennessee
