= Clinch River Nuclear Site =

Proposed nuclear reactor site in Oak Ridge, Tennessee

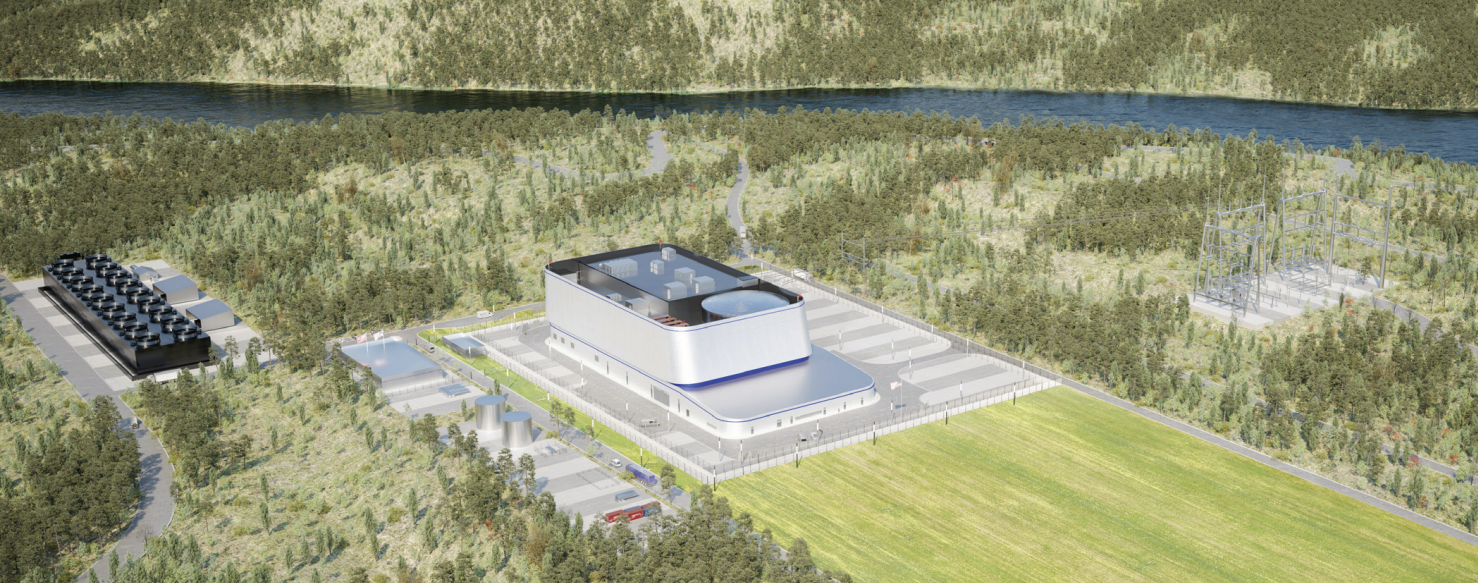
- Artistic rendering of the Clinch River small modular reactor (SMR) facility
- Country: United States
- Location: Oak Ridge, Tennessee
- Coordinates: 35°53′24″N 84°22′57″W
- Status: Proposed
- Owner: Tennessee Valley Authority
- Operator: Tennessee Valley Authority

Nuclear power station
- Reactor type: BWR
- Reactor supplier: GE Vernova Hitachi Nuclear Energy
- Cooling source: Clinch River

Power generation
- Units planned: 1 × 300 MW BWRX-300

The Clinch River Nuclear Site (CRNS) is a project site owned by the Tennessee Valley Authority (TVA). It was originally the site of the Clinch River Breeder Reactor Project.

In 2022, TVA announced that it would build a small modular reactor (SMR) at the site, and selected the 300 MW BWRX-300 design for use. It applied for a construction permit from the Nuclear Regulatory Commission in 2025, which it received in 2026.

== Small modular reactor project ==
TVA had received an Early Site Permit (ESP) for the CRNS in 2019, which authorized up to 800 MW_{e} of water-cooled small modular reactors. In February 2022, the site was announced as the first location of an SMR as part of the TVA's New Nuclear Program, which was approved the same year. In August 2022, TVA announced it had selected the GE Vernova Hitachi (GEVH) BWRX-300, a small modular boiling water reactor, for deployment.

TVA submitted the first half of its construction permit application to the Nuclear Regulatory Commission (NRC) in April 2025. The US Department of Energy announced that it would provide $400 million worth of cost sharing to support the project. In June 2026, the NRC issued a positive safety determination several months ahead of schedule. The permit was issued on September 29, 2026.
