= Clinch River Breeder Reactor Project =

Cancelled breeder reactor demonstration project in Oak Ridge, Tennessee

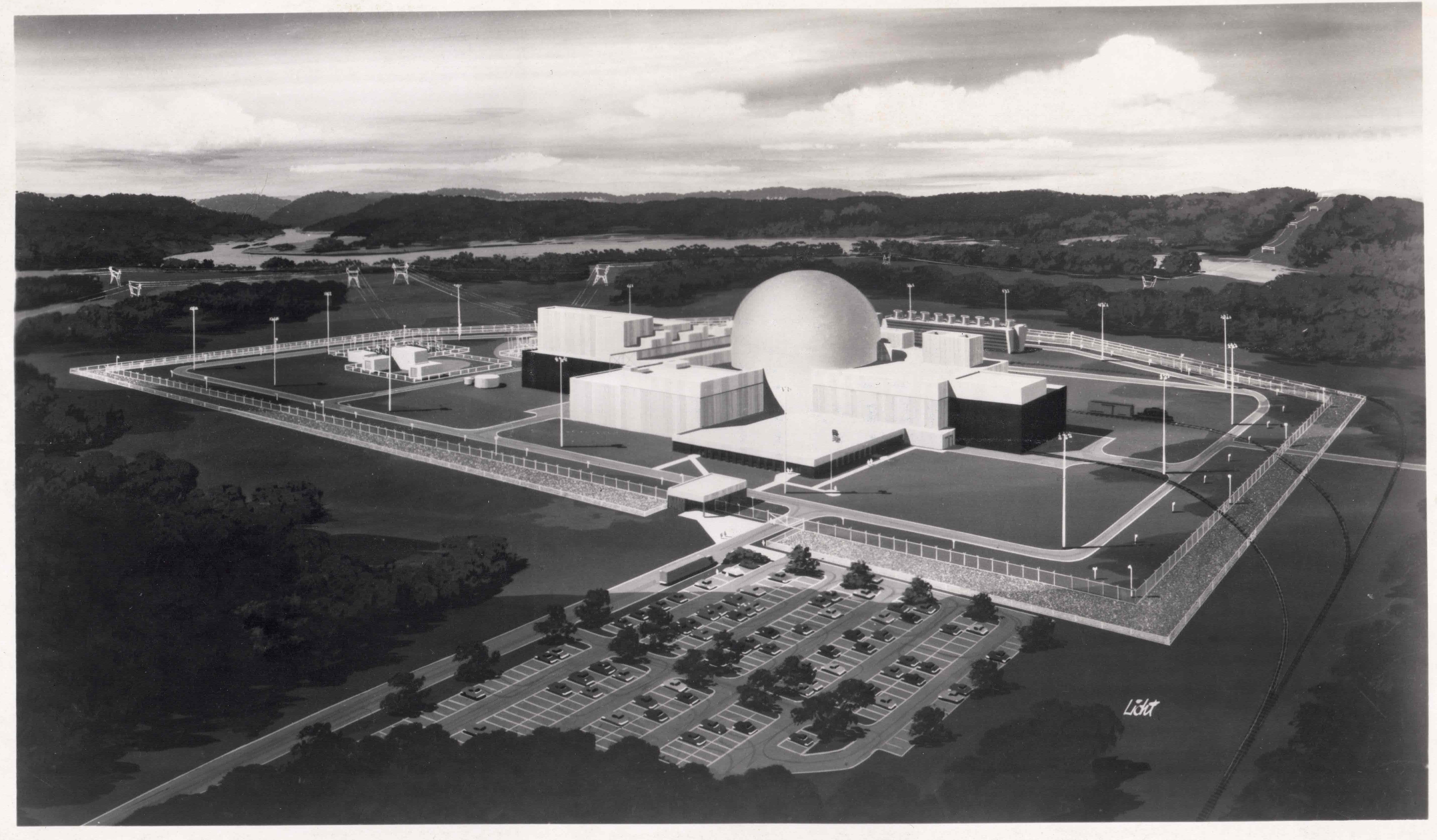
- Artist's concept of the Clinch River Breeder Reactor Plant, looking east
- Country: United States
- Location: Oak Ridge, Tennessee
- Coordinates: 35°53′24″N 84°22′57″W
- Status: Cancelled
- Owner: United States Department of Energy
- Operator: Tennessee Valley Authority

Nuclear power station
- Reactor type: SFR
- Reactor supplier: Westinghouse Electric Corporation

Thermal power station
- Primary fuel: Plutonium
- Cooling source: Clinch River
- Thermal capacity: 975 MW

Power generation
- Units cancelled: 1
- Nameplate capacity: 350 MW

External links
- Commons: Related media on Commons

The Clinch River Breeder Reactor Project was a nuclear reactor project that aimed to build the USA's first large-scale demonstration breeder reactor plant. It was led by the U.S. Atomic Energy Commission (and a successor agency, the U.S. Energy Research and Development Administration (ERDA), and subsequently the U.S. Department of Energy). The project was opposed by President Carter.

The project was intended as a prototype and demonstration for building a class of such reactors, called Liquid Metal Fast Breeder Reactors (LMFBR), in the United States. The project was first authorized in 1970. After initial appropriations were provided in 1972, work continued until the U.S. Congress terminated funding on October 26, 1983. The project was seen to be "unnecessary and wasteful".

== Location ==
The site for the Clinch River Breeder Reactor was a 1,364-acre (6 km^{2}) land parcel owned by the TVA adjacent to the Clinch River in Roane County, Tennessee, inside the city limits of Oak Ridge, Tennessee, but remote from the city's residential population. The site is now known as the Clinch River Nuclear Site.

== Reactor design ==
The reactor would have been rated at 1000 megawatts (MW) of thermal output, with a net plant output of 350 MW (electrical) and a gross output of 380 MW.

The reactor core was designed to contain 198 hexagonal fuel assemblies, arranged to form a cylindrical geometry with two enrichment zones. The inner core would have contained 18% plutonium and would have consisted of 108 assemblies. It would have been surrounded by the outer zone, which would have consisted of 90 assemblies of 24% plutonium to promote more uniform heat generation.

The active fuel would have been surrounded by a radial blanket consisting of 150 assemblies of similar, but not identical, design containing depleted uranium oxide; outside of the blanket would have been 324 radial shield assemblies of the same overall hexagonal geometry.

The primary (green) and secondary (gold) control rod systems would have provided overall plant shutdown reliability. Each system would have contained boron carbide. The secondary rods were to be used only for SCRAM, and would have been required to be fully withdrawn before startup could be initiated.

== Procurement of components ==
A significant number of major reactor components were procured for the CRBRP.

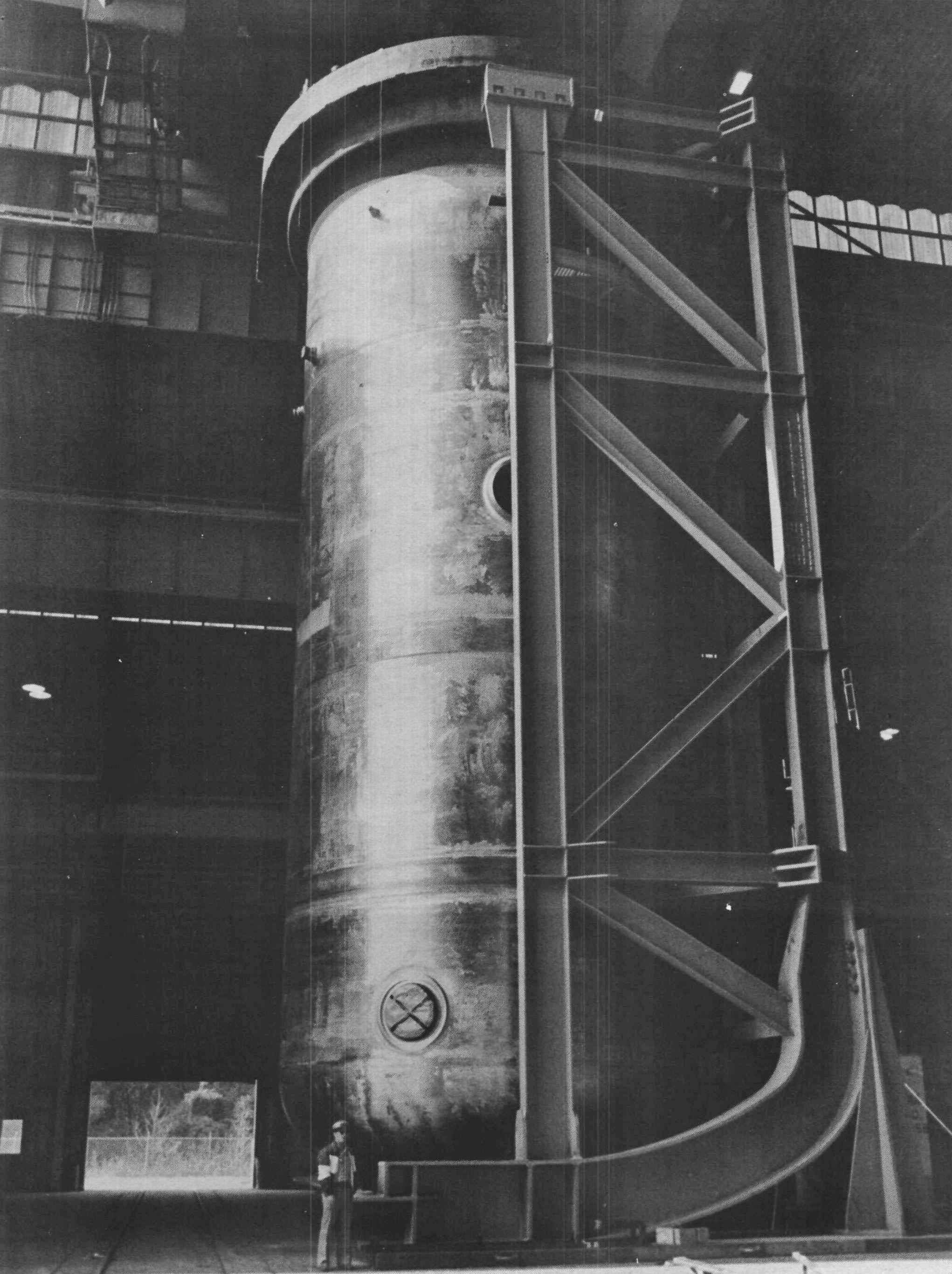
CRBRP reactor vessel in the J-frame that will be used for transporting and erecting it

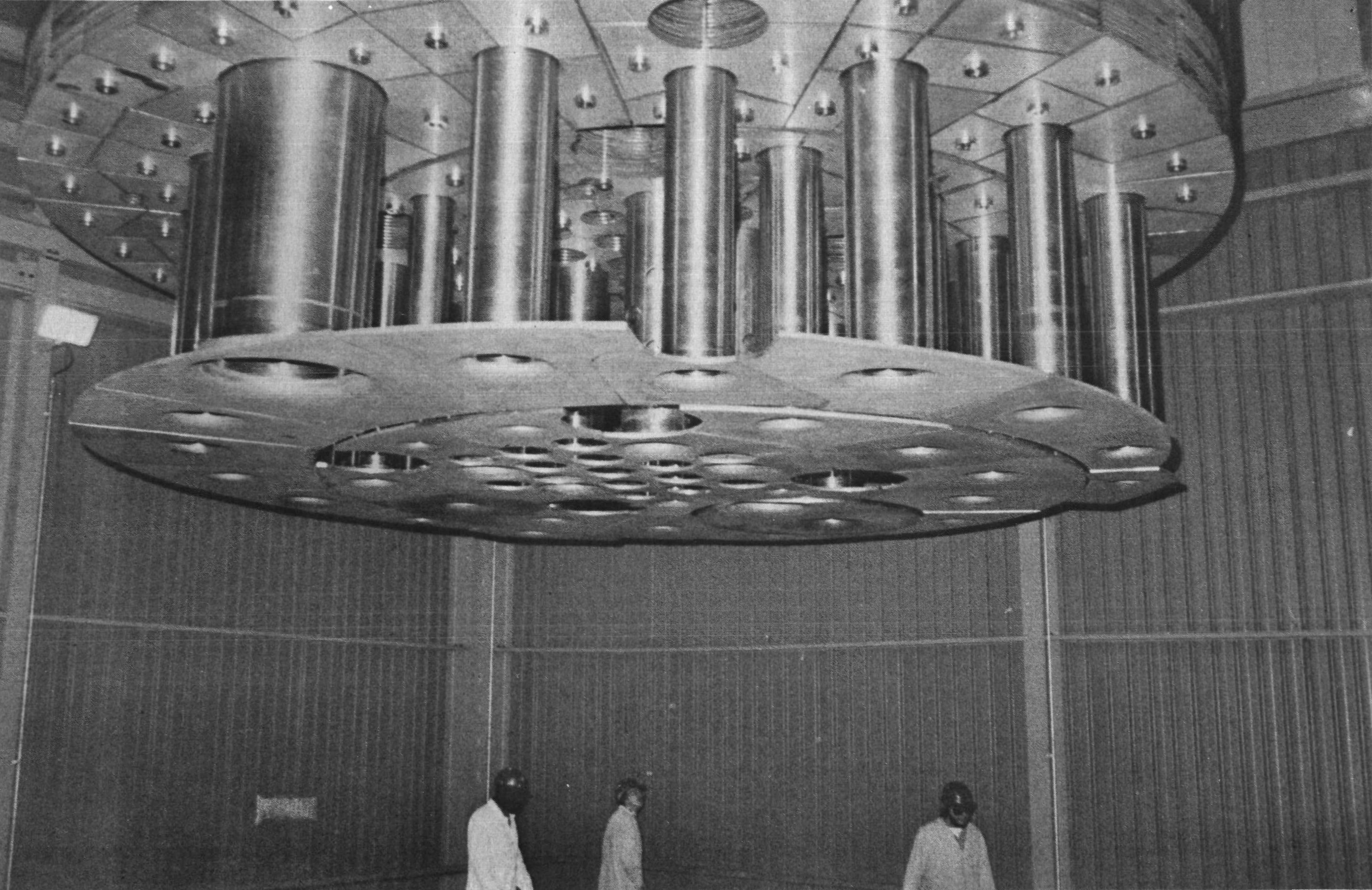
CRBRP completed reactor closure head assembly seen from below

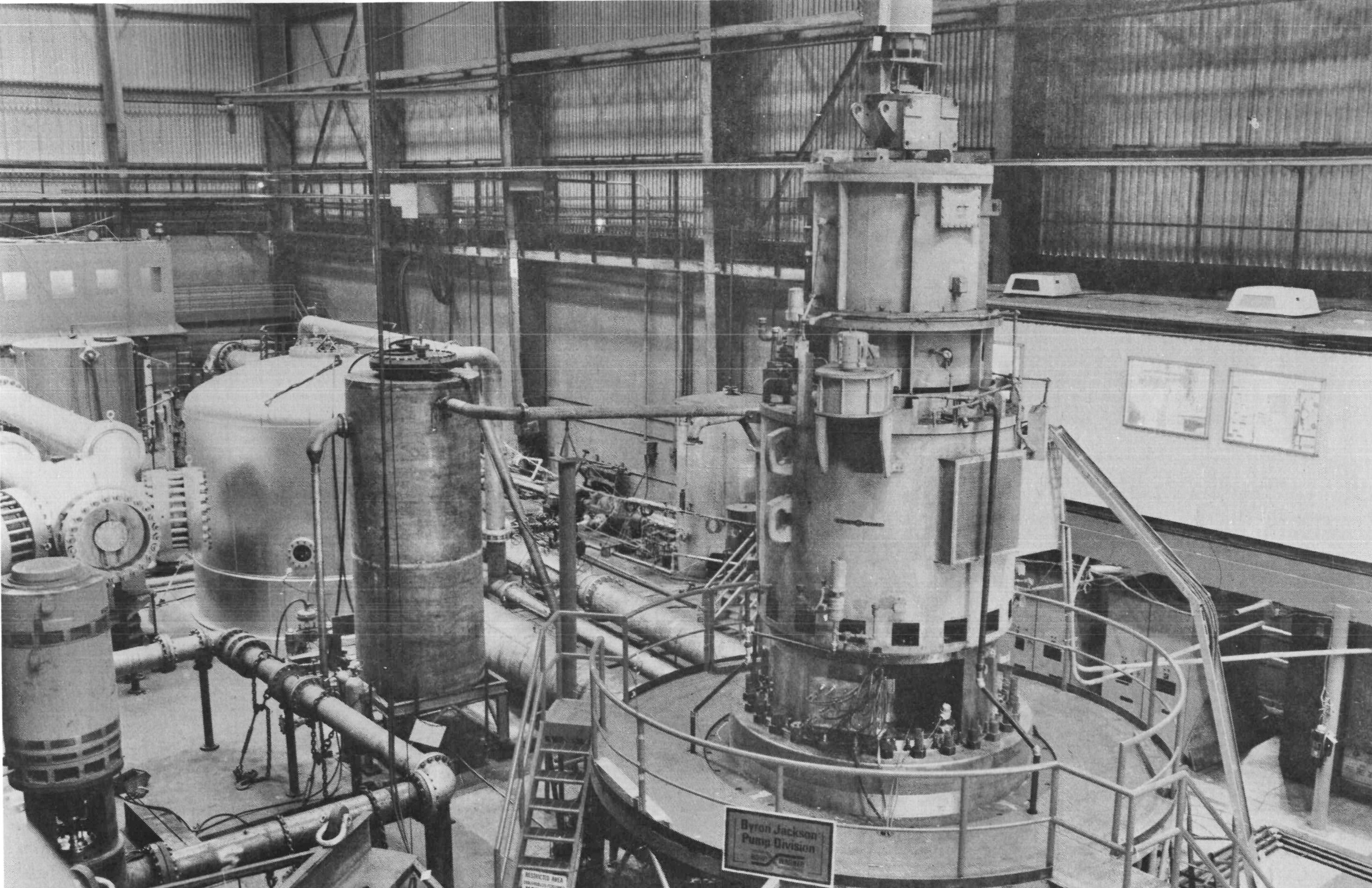
Prototype primary system sodium pump, and its drive motor, ready for water testing

By 1981, the following components were 100% complete:

- Ex-vessel sodium tank
- In- and ex-Containment sodium storage tanks
- Primary sodium overflow vessel
- Thermal transient valves
- In-vessel transfer machine

Heat exchanger, control rods, sodium pumps were also built and in testing.

== Project economics and politics ==
The Clinch River Breeder Reactor was initially conceived as a major step toward developing liquid-metal fast breeder reactor technology as a commercially viable electric power generation system in the United States. In 1971 U.S. President Richard Nixon established this technology as the nation’s highest priority research and development effort. However, the Clinch River project was controversial from the start, and economic and political considerations eventually led to its demise.

=== Project costs ===
One issue was the continuing escalation in the cost of the project. In 1971 the Atomic Energy Commission estimated that the Clinch River project would cost about $400 million. Private industry promised to contribute the majority of the project cost ($257 million). By the following year, however, projected costs had jumped to nearly $700 million. By 1981 $1 billion of public money had been spent on the project, and the estimated cost to completion had grown to $3.0-$3.2 billion, with another billion dollars needed for an associated spent nuclear fuel reprocessing facility. A Congressional committee investigation released in 1981 found evidence of contracting abuse, including bribery and fraud, that added to project costs. Before it was finally canceled in 1983, the General Accounting Office of Congress estimated the total project cost at $8 billion.

=== Technology costs ===
Another issue was the high cost of building and operating breeder reactors to produce electricity. In 1981, it was estimated that construction costs for a fast breeder reactor would be twice the cost of building a conventional light-water nuclear reactor of similar capacity. That same year it was estimated that the market price of mined, processed uranium, then $25 per pound, would have to increase to nearly $165 per pound in 1981 dollars before the breeder would become financially competitive with the conventional light-water nuclear reactor. United States electric utility companies were reluctant to invest in such an expensive technology.

=== Nuclear weapons proliferation ===
Concerns about potential nuclear weapons proliferation were another serious issue for the commercial breeder reactor program, because this technology produces plutonium that potentially could be used to make nuclear weapons. Because of international concern about proliferation, in April 1977 President Jimmy Carter called for an indefinite deferral of construction of commercial breeder reactors.

=== Cancellation ===
President Carter was a consistent opponent of the Clinch River project. In November 1977, in a statement explaining his veto of a bill to authorize funding for the continuation of the project, Carter said it would be "large and unnecessarily expensive" and "when completed, would be technically obsolete and economically unsound." Furthermore, he said the project would have little value for determining the commercial viability of breeder technology in the United States.

Congress persisted in keeping the Clinch River project alive over the President's objections, and Carter repeatedly chastised Congress for its actions. In a speech in 1979, after the House Science and Technology Committee had voted to proceed with the project over his opposition, he said "The Clinch River breeder reactor is a technological dinosaur. It's a waste of more than $1-1/2 billion of taxpayers' money. It's an assault on our attempts to control the spread of dangerous nuclear materials. It marches our nuclear policy in exactly the wrong direction. ... This is no time to change America into a plutonium society." Instead of investing public resources in the breeder demonstration project, he urged attention to improving the safety of existing nuclear technology.

== Restart and cancellation again ==
The Clinch River Breeder Reactor Project was revived after President Ronald Reagan took office in 1981. In spite of growing opposition from Congress and analysts inside and outside the government, ground was broken and construction began. The project was finally terminated when, on October 26, 1983, the U.S. Senate voted 56-40 to deny any further financing for the project.
