= BWRX-300 =

Small modular nuclear reactor design

The BWRX-300 is a design for a small modular nuclear reactor proposed by GE Vernova Hitachi Nuclear Energy (GVH), engineered to produce up to 300 MW of electricity. The BWRX-300 would feature passive safety, in that neither external power nor operator action would be required to maintain a safe state, even in extreme circumstances.

BWRX-300 has a design lifetime of 60 years.

== Technology ==
The BWRX-300 is a smaller evolution of an earlier GE Vernova Hitachi reactor design, (Note: GVH describes the BWRX as the tenth version of its boiling water reactors, following the BWR 1–6, ABWR, SBWR, and ESBWR.) the Economic Simplified Boiling Water Reactor (ESBWR), and utilizes components of the operational Advanced Boiling Water Reactor (ABWR). Boiling water reactors are nuclear technology that use ordinary light water as a nuclear reactor coolant. Like most boiling water reactors, the BWRX-300 will use a medium pressure steam-water cycle to cool the core. A distinct feature of this reactor design is that the water is circulated within the core by natural circulation. This is in contrast to most nuclear reactors which require electrical pumps to provide active cooling of the fuel. This system has advantages in terms of both simplicity and economics.

=== Decay heat removal ===
Immediately after a nuclear reactor shuts down, almost 7% of its previous operating power continues to be generated from the decay of short-half-life fission products. In conventional reactors, removing this decay heat passively is challenging because those reactors are not designed to use natural circulation as the principal mechanism for cooling the core. The BWRX-300 reactor would be cooled by the natural circulation of water, making it distinct from most nuclear plants which require active cooling with electrical pumps.

== New build proposals ==
In 2019, GVH said that it expected construction of the BWRX-300 to start in 2024 or 2025 in the US or Canada, entering commercial operation in 2027 or 2028, and for the first unit to cost less than $1 billion to build.

=== Canada ===
On December 1, 2021, Ontario Power Generation (OPG) selected the BWRX-300 SMR for use at the Darlington Nuclear Generating Station. In October 2022, OPG applied for a construction license for the reactor, with plans to start operations in 2028. On July 7, 2023, OPG ordered three additional BWRX-300 SMRs for construction at the Darlington New Nuclear Project in Ontario, Canada, joining the first already planned. The final investment decision was reached in May 2025, with an updated completion date of 2030 for the first unit; OPG's build of the first unit is forecast to cost CA$7.7 billion, including other site infrastructure for the full four-unit plan, with an estimated cost of CA$13.2 billion (US$9.6 billion) for the three further units on the same site.

On June 27, 2022, Saskatchewan Power Corporation (SaskPower) selected the BWRX-300 SMR for potential deployment in Saskatchewan in the mid-2030s.

=== Poland ===
On December 16, 2021, Synthos Green Energy (SGE), GE Hitachi Nuclear Energy and BWXT Canada announced their intention to deploy at least 10 BWRX-300 reactors in Poland in the early 2030s. On July 8, 2022, Orlen Synthos Green — a joint venture between SGE and PKN Orlen — applied to the National Atomic Energy Agency for a general opinion on the BWRX-300 SMR technology. In August of the same year a date of delivery of the reactor was announced: 2029. In December 2023 the initial government permit was issued to Synthos Green.

=== United States ===
On August 3, 2022, the Tennessee Valley Authority (TVA) announced that it had entered into an agreement with GVH to support its planning and preliminary licensing for the potential deployment of a BWRX-300 small modular reactor at the Clinch River site near Oak Ridge, Tennessee. In December 2025, the United States Department of Energy allocated TVA a grant of $400 million to assist financing the build.

=== Sweden ===
On March 14, 2022, Kärnfull Future AB signed a Memorandum of Understanding with GVH to deploy the BWRX-300 in Sweden. On August 21, 2025, Vattenfall AB presented the BWRX-300 as a candidate for building in Sweden.

=== Estonia ===
On February 8, 2023, Fermi Energia AS chose the BWRX-300 SMR for potential deployment in Lääne-Viru County in the early 2030s.

=== Hungary ===
On July 30, 2025, a letter of intent was signed by the Hungarian nuclear energy development firm Hunatom and Synthos Green Energy to deploy up to ten BWRX-300 small modular reactors in Hungary.

=== Bulgaria ===
Bulgaria is exploring the possibility of deploying the BWRX-300 SMR as a part of the future development of its energy sector.
