= Tennessee Valley Authority =

American utility company

- Logo of the TVA Flag of the TVA

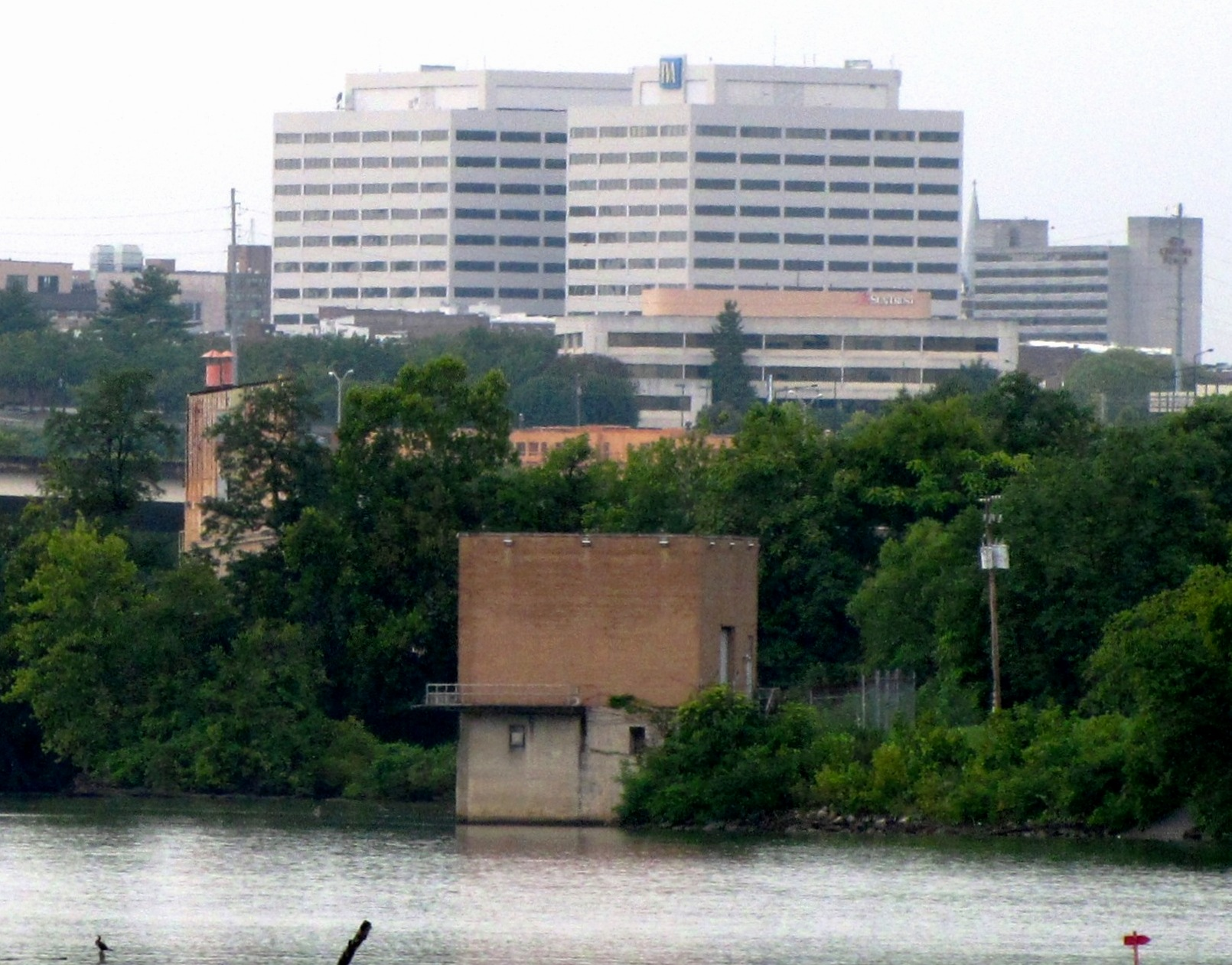
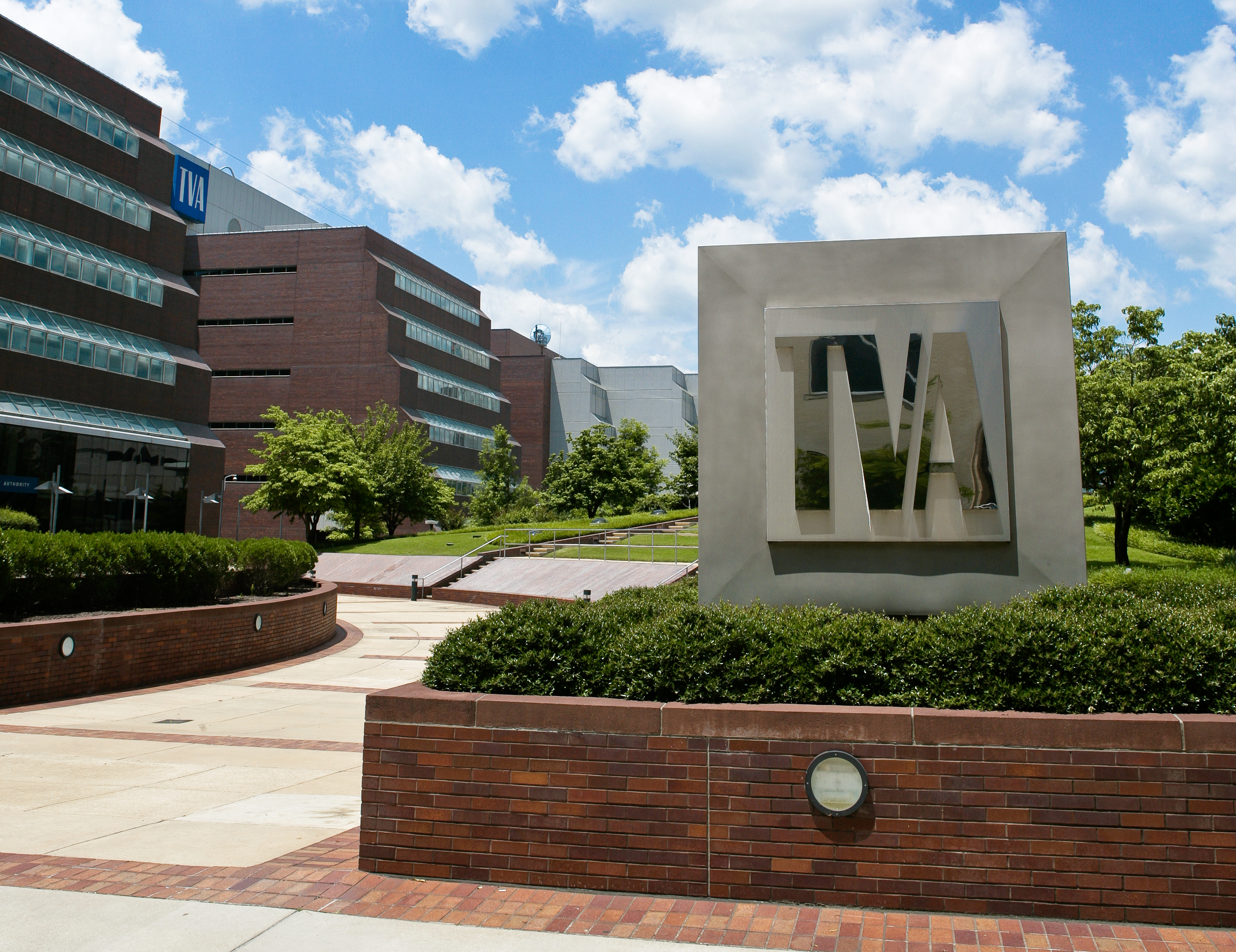
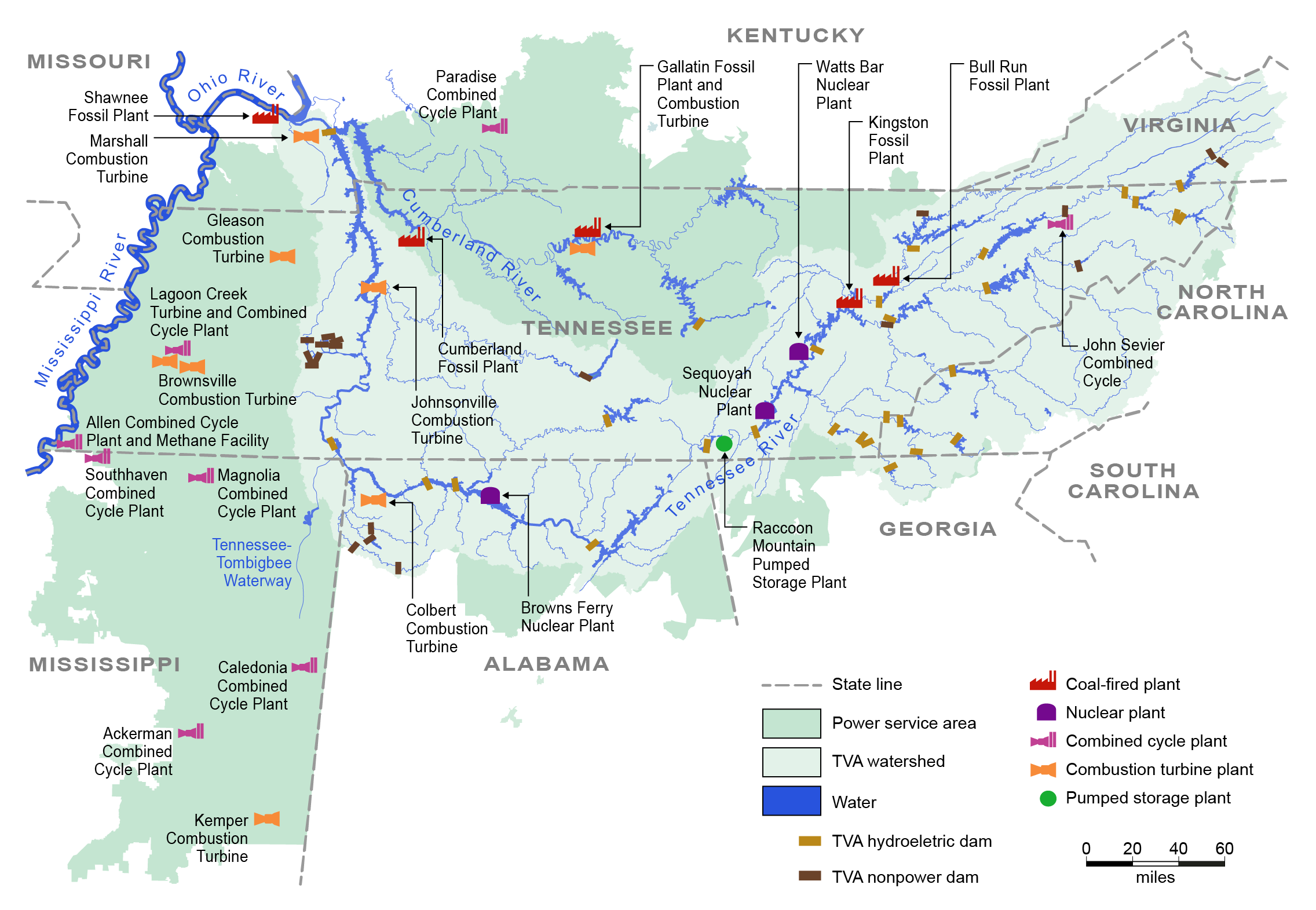
- From top down and left to right: TVA's twin tower administrative headquarters in Knoxville, TVA's power operations headquarters in Chattanooga, and a map of TVA's service area and facilities
- Type: State-owned enterprise
- Industry: Electric utility
- Founded: May 18, 1933
- Founders: Harcourt Morgan; Arthur Morgan; David Lilienthal; Federal government of the United States
- Headquarters: Knoxville, Tennessee, U.S.
- Key people: Mike Skaggs (CEO)
- Revenue: ▲US$13.67 billion (2025)
- Net income: ▲US$1.36 billion (2025)
- Owner: Federal government of the United States
- Website: tva.com

The Tennessee Valley Authority (TVA) is a federally-owned electric utility corporation in the United States. TVA's service area covers all of Tennessee, portions of Alabama, Mississippi, and Kentucky, and small areas of Georgia, North Carolina, and Virginia. While owned by the federal government, TVA receives no taxpayer funding and operates similarly to a private for-profit company. It is headquartered in Knoxville, Tennessee, and is the sixth-largest power supplier and largest public utility in the country.

The TVA was created by Congress in 1933 as part of President Franklin D. Roosevelt's New Deal. Its initial purpose was to provide navigation, flood control, electricity generation, fertilizer manufacturing, regional planning, and economic development to the Tennessee Valley, a region that had suffered from lack of infrastructure and even more extensive poverty during the Great Depression than other regions of the nation. TVA was envisioned both as a power supplier and a regional economic development agency that would work to help modernize the region's economy and society. It later evolved primarily into an electric utility. It was the first large regional planning agency of the U.S. federal government, and remains the largest.

Under the leadership of David E. Lilienthal, the TVA also became the global model for the United States' later efforts to help modernize agrarian societies in the developing world. The TVA historically has been documented as a success in its efforts to modernize the Tennessee Valley and helping to recruit new employment opportunities to the region. However, historians have criticized its use of eminent domain and the displacement of over 125,000 Tennessee Valley residents to build the agency's infrastructure projects.

== Operation ==
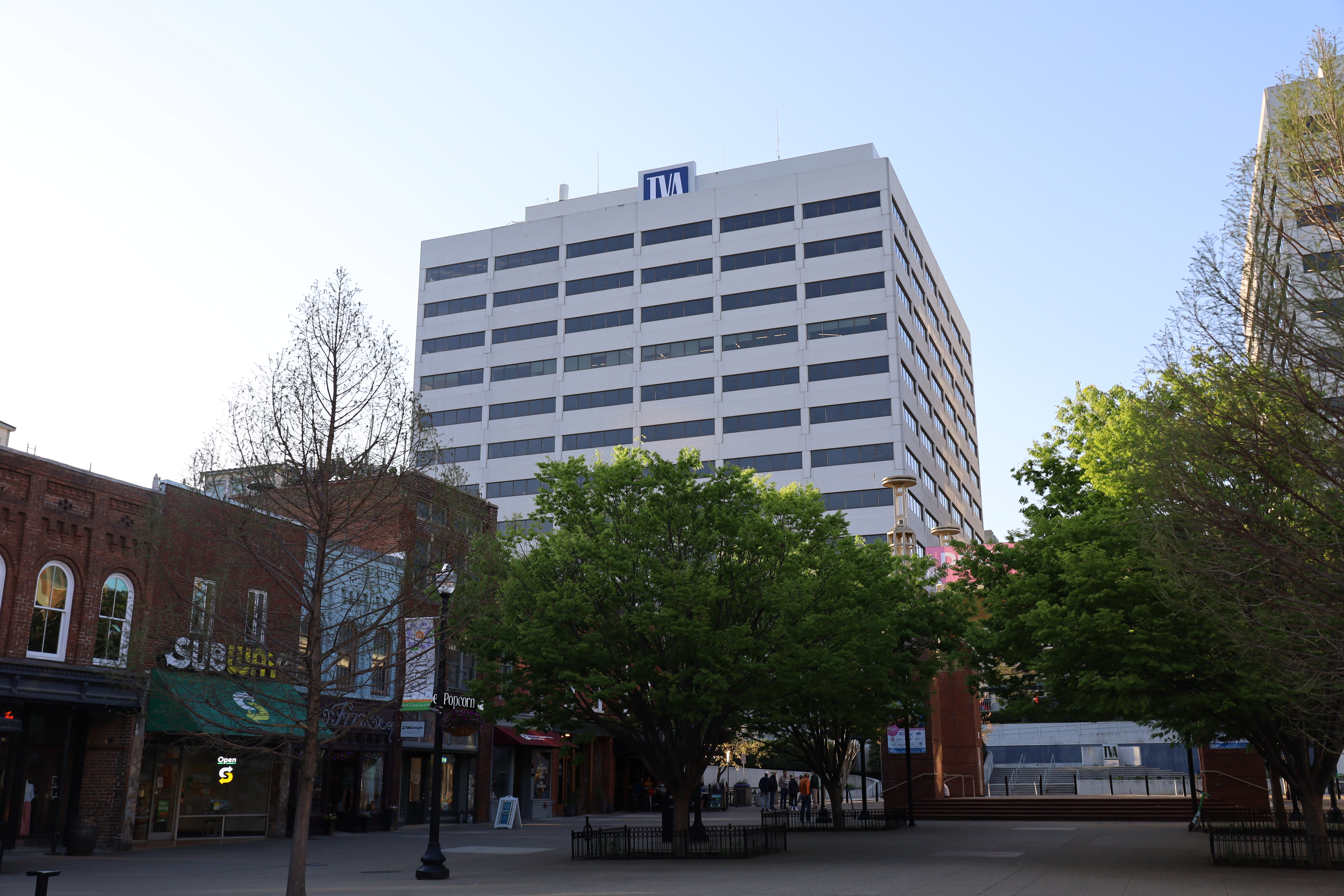
TVA headquarters building in Knoxville, Tennessee, in 2025

The Tennessee Valley Authority is a government-owned corporation created by U.S. Code Title 16, Chapter 12A, the Tennessee Valley Authority Act of 1933. It was initially founded as an agency to provide general economic development to the region through power generation, flood control, navigation assistance, fertilizer manufacturing, and agricultural development. Since the Depression years, it has developed primarily into a power utility. Despite its shares being owned by the federal government, TVA operates like a private corporation, and receives no taxpayer funding. The TVA Act authorizes the company to use eminent domain.

TVA provides electricity to approximately ten million people through a diverse portfolio that includes nuclear, coal-fired, natural gas-fired, hydroelectric, and renewable generation. TVA sells its power to 153 local power utilities, 58 direct-serve industrial and institutional customers, seven federal installations, and 12 area utilities. In addition to power generation, TVA provides flood control with its 29 hydroelectric dams. Resulting lakes and other areas support recreational activities. The TVA also provides navigation and land management along rivers within its region of operation, which is the fifth-largest river system in the United States, and assists governments and private companies on economic development projects.

TVA's headquarters are located in downtown Knoxville, with large administrative offices in Chattanooga (training/development; supplier relations; power generation and transmission) and Nashville (economic development) in Tennessee and Muscle Shoals, Alabama. TVA's headquarters were housed in the Old Customs House in Knoxville from 1936 until 1976, when the current complex opened. The building is now operated as a museum and is listed on the National Register of Historic Places. The Tennessee Valley Authority Police is the primary law enforcement agency for the company. Initially part of the TVA, in 1994 the TVA Police was authorized as a federal law enforcement agency.

=== Board of directors ===
The Tennessee Valley Authority is governed by a nine-member part-time board of directors, nominated by the president of the United States and confirmed by the Senate. A minimum of seven of the directors are required to be residents of TVA's service area. The members select the chair from their number, and serve five-year terms. (Note: When their terms expire, directors may remain on the board until the end of the current congressional session (typically in December) or until their successors take office, whichever comes first.) They receive annual stipends of $45,000 ($50,000 for the chair). The board members choose the TVA's chief executive officer. When their terms expire, directors may remain on the board until the end of the current congressional session (typically in December) or until their successors take office, whichever comes first.

=== Board members ===
The current board members as of May 15, 2026:

Position	Name	State	Appointed by	Sworn in	Term expires
Chair	Mitch Graves	Tennessee	Donald Trump	January 12, 2026	May 18, 2029
Member	Jeff Hagood	Tennessee	Donald Trump	January 12, 2026	May 18, 2026
Member	Arthur Graham	Florida	Donald Trump	January 12, 2026	May 18, 2026
Member	Randy Jones	Alabama	Donald Trump	January 12, 2026	May 18, 2028
Member	Bobby Klein	Tennessee	Joe Biden	January 4, 2023	May 18, 2026
Member	Wade White	Kentucky	Joe Biden	January 4, 2023	May 18, 2027
Member	Vacant				May 18, 2027
Member	Vacant				May 18, 2029
Member	Vacant				May 18, 2030

=== Nominations ===
President Trump has nominated the following to fill a seat on the board. They await Senate confirmation.

Name	State	Term expires	Replacing
Lee Beaman	Tennessee	May 18, 2030	Joe H. Ritch
Arthur Graham	Florida	May 18, 2031	Reappointment

=== Power generation ===
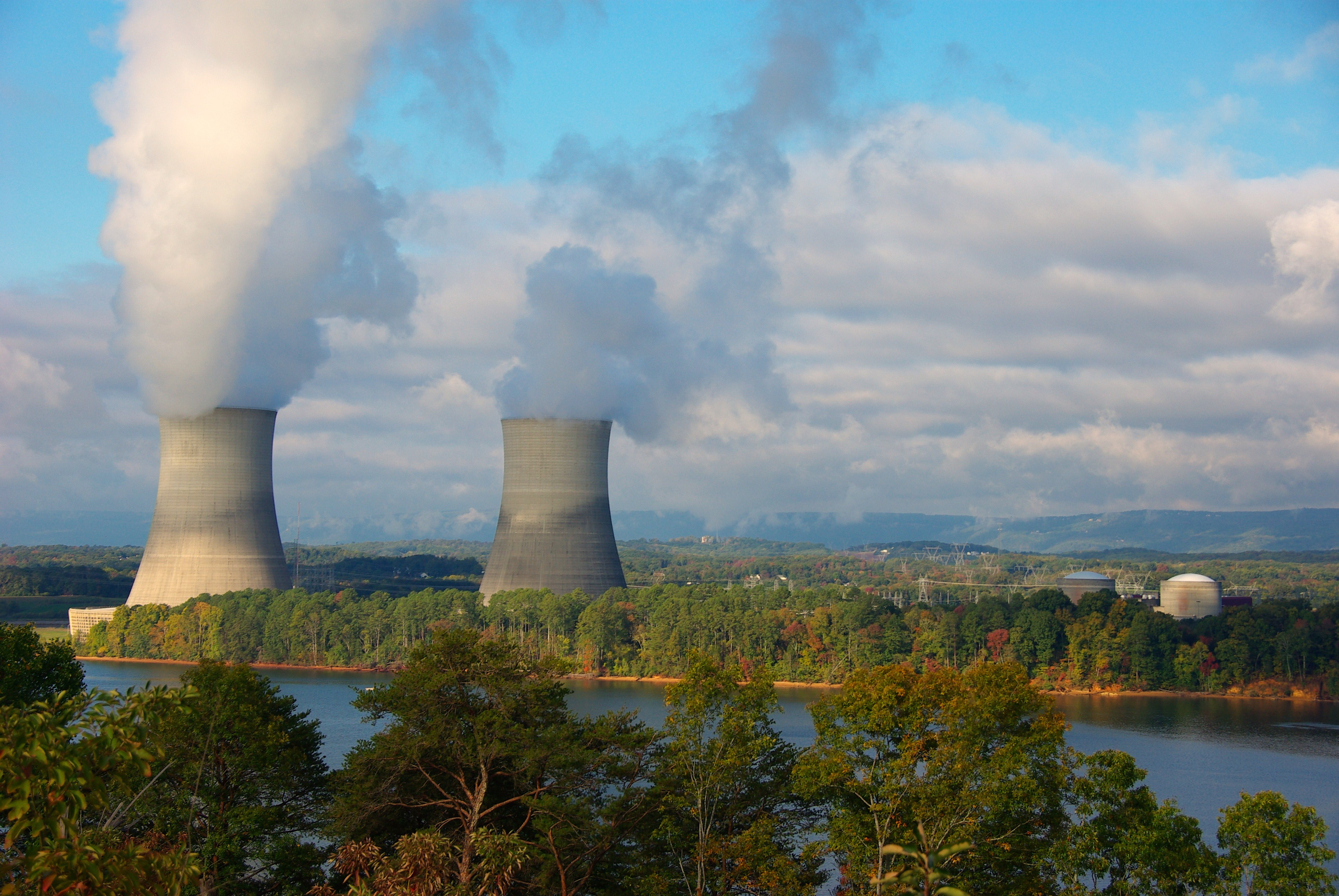
The twin cooling towers and reactor containment buildings of TVA's Sequoyah Nuclear Plant north of Chattanooga

==== Power stations ====
With a generating capacity of approximately 35 gigawatts (GW), TVA has the sixth-highest generation capacity of any utility company in the United States and the third-largest nuclear power fleet, with seven units at three sites. It also operates four coal-fired power plants, 29 hydroelectric dams, nine simple-cycle natural gas combustion turbine plants, nine combined cycle gas plants, one pumped storage hydroelectric plant, one wind energy site, and 14 solar energy sites. In fiscal year 2020, nuclear generation made up about 41% of TVA's total energy production, natural gas 26%, coal 14%, hydroelectric 13%, and wind and solar 3%. TVA purchases about 15% of the power it sells from other power producers, which includes power from combined cycle natural gas plants, coal plants, and wind installations, and other renewables. The cost of Purchased Power is part of the "Fuel Cost Adjustment" (FCA) charge that is separate from the TVA Rate. In addition, the Watts Bar Nuclear Plant is the only facility in the country to industrially produce tritium, which is used by the National Nuclear Security Administration for nuclear weapons, where it is used to supercharge and boost the explosive yield of the U.S. nuclear arsenal.

==== Electric transmission ====
TVA owns and operates its own electric grid, which consists of approximately 16,200 miles (26,100 km) of lines, one of the largest grids in the United States. The grid is part of the Eastern Interconnection of the North American power transmission grid, and is under the jurisdiction of the SERC Reliability Corporation. Like most North American utilities, TVA uses a maximum transmission voltage of 500 kilovolts (kV), with lines carrying this voltage using bundled conductors with three conductors per phase. The vast majority of TVA's transmission lines carry 161kV, with the company also operating sub-transmission lines with voltages of 69kV and 46kV. They also operate a small number of 115kV and 230kV lines in Alabama and Georgia that connect to Southern Company lines of the same voltage.

=== Recreation ===
TVA has conveyed approximately 485,420 acres (1,964.4 km^{2}) of property for recreation and preservation purposes including public parks, public access areas and roadside parks, wildlife refuges, national parks and forests, and other camps and recreation areas, comprising approximately 759 different sites.

Currently, TVA manages 293,000 acres (1,190 km^{2}) of federally owned land for public use. These lands are managed as either TVA Natural Areas or TVA Day-Use Recreation Areas. Natural Areas are smaller, ecologically or historically significant areas set aside for conservation, with some areas including hiking and walking trails. Day-Use Recreation Areas comprise about 80 different locations throughout the Tennessee Valley largely concentrated on or near TVA reservoirs that include water access points, campgrounds, hiking trails, fishing piers, and equestrian facilities.

=== Economic development ===
TVA operates an economic development organization that works with companies and economic development agencies throughout the Tennessee Valley to create jobs via private investments. They also work with businesses to help them choose locations for facilities and expand existing facilities. Services provided include assistance with site selection, employee recruitment and training, and research. A total of seven sites throughout the Valley are certified by TVA as megasites, which contain a minimum of 1,000 acres (4.0 km^{2}), and have access to an Interstate Highway and the potential for rail service, and environmental impact study, and contain or have the potential to contain direct-serve industrial customers.

Although Knoxville TVA Employees Credit Union was not directly affiliated with the Tennessee Valley Authority, it was established in 1934 as one of the Authority's earliest economic efforts.

== History ==
=== Background ===
In the late 19th century, the Army Corps of Engineers first recognized several potential dam sites along the Tennessee River for electricity generation and navigation improvements. The National Defense Act of 1916, signed into law by President Woodrow Wilson, authorized construction of a hydroelectric dam on the Tennessee River in Muscle Shoals, Alabama, for the purpose of producing nitrates for ammunition; that dam was completed in 1924. During the 1920s and the 1930s, Americans began to support the idea of public ownership of utilities, particularly hydroelectric power facilities. Many believed privately owned power companies were charging too much for power, did not employ fair operating practices, and were subject to abuse by their owners–utility holding companies–at the expense of consumers. The concept of government-owned generation facilities selling to publicly owned distribution utilities was controversial, and remains so today. The private-sector practice of forming utility holding companies resulted in them controlling 94% of generation by 1921, and they were essentially unregulated. In an effort to change this, Congress and Roosevelt enacted the Public Utility Holding Company Act of 1935 (PUHCA). During his 1932 presidential campaign, Franklin D. Roosevelt expressed his belief that private utilities had "selfish purposes" and said, "Never shall the federal government part with its sovereignty or with its control of its power resources while I'm President of the United States."

U.S. Senator George W. Norris of Nebraska also distrusted private utility companies, and in 1920 blocked a proposal from industrialist Henry Ford to build a private dam and create a utility to modernize the Tennessee Valley. In 1930, Norris sponsored the Muscle Shoals Bill, which would have built a federal dam in the valley, but it was vetoed by President Herbert Hoover, who believed it to be socialistic. The idea behind the Muscle Shoals project became a core part of President Roosevelt's New Deal program that created the Tennessee Valley Authority.

Even by Depression standards, the Tennessee Valley was in dire economic straits in 1933. 30% of the population was affected by malaria. The average income in the rural areas was $639 per year (equivalent to $12,602 in 2025), with some families surviving on as little as $100 per year (equivalent to $1,972 in 2025). Much of the land had been exhausted by poor farming practices, and the soil was eroded and depleted. Crop yields had fallen, reducing farm incomes. The best timber had been cut, and 10% of forests were lost to fires each year.

=== Founding and early history ===
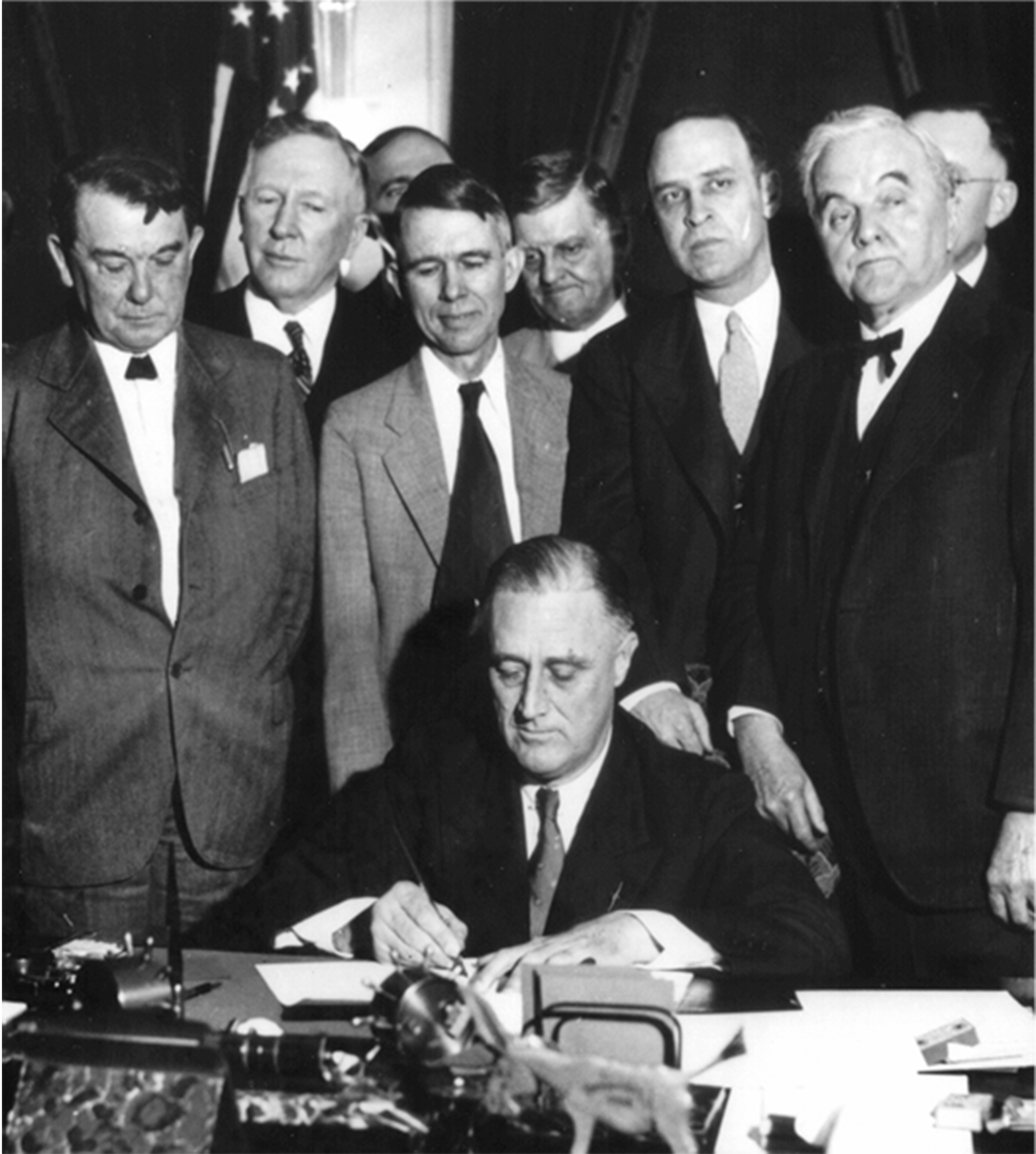
President Franklin D. Roosevelt signing the TVA Act

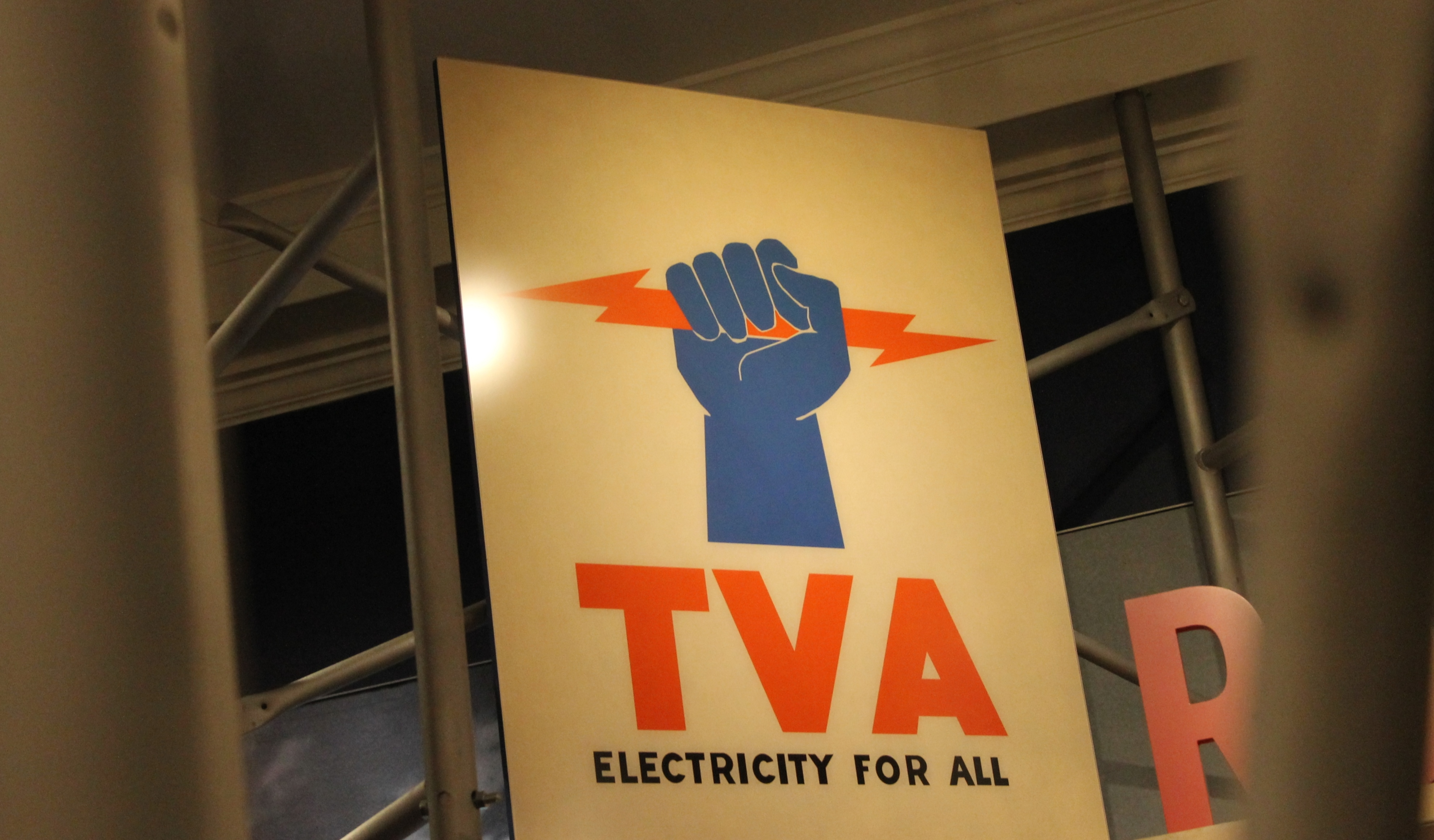
TVA poster at the Franklin D. Roosevelt Presidential Library and Museum

President Franklin D. Roosevelt signed the Tennessee Valley Authority Act (ch. 32, Pub. L. 73–17, 48 Stat. 58, enacted May 18, 1933, codified as amended at 16 U.S.C. § 831, et seq.), creating the TVA. The agency was initially tasked with modernizing the region, using experts and electricity to combat human and economic problems. TVA developed fertilizers, and taught farmers ways to improve crop yields. In addition, it helped replant forests, control forest fires, and improve habitats for fish and wildlife.

The authority hired many of the area's unemployed for a variety of jobs: they conducted conservation, economic development, and social programs. For instance, a library service was instituted for this area. The professional staff at headquarters were generally composed of experts from outside the region. By 1934, TVA employed more than 9,000 people. The workers were classified by the usual racial and gender lines of the region, which limited opportunities for minorities and women. TVA hired few African Americans, generally restricted for janitorial or other low-level positions. TVA recognized labor unions; its skilled and semi-skilled blue collar employees were unionized, a breakthrough in an area known for corporations hostile to miners' and textile workers' unions. Women were excluded from construction work. With the goal of providing further economic relief to TVA employees, Knoxville TVA Employees Credit Union was formed. In 1934, Knoxville TVA Employees Credit Union established a place for TVA employees to store their money when the Great Depression shuttered many traditional banks.

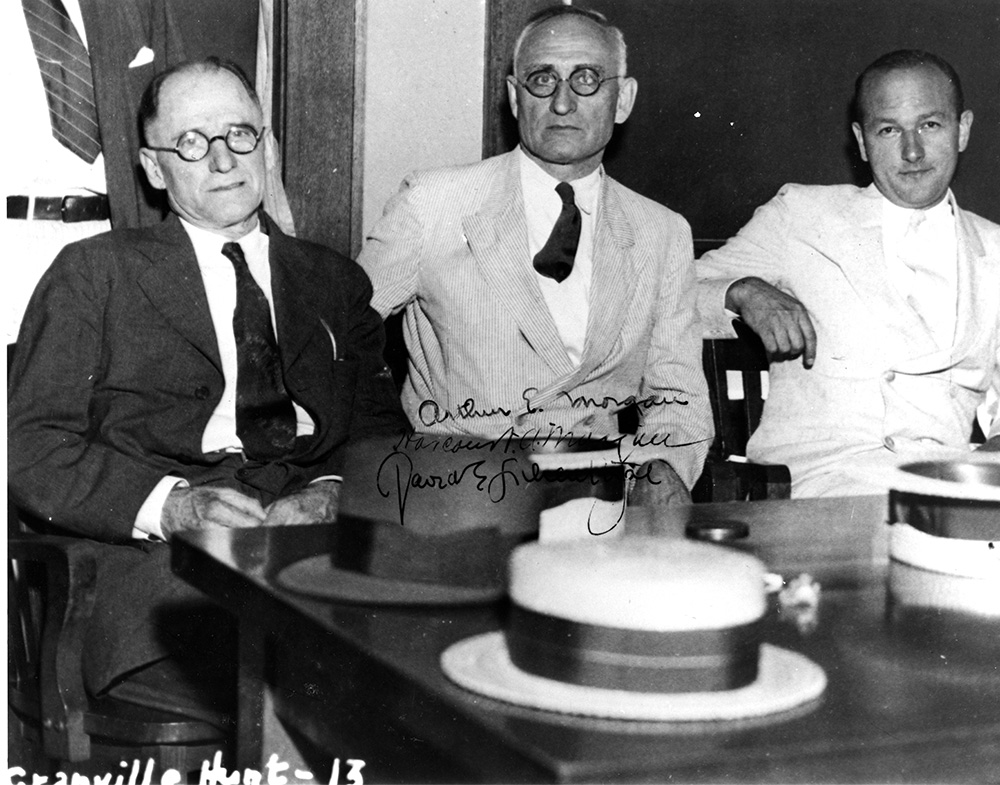
TVA's first board (L to R): Harcourt Morgan, Arthur E. Morgan, and David E. Lilienthal

Many local landowners were suspicious of government agencies, but TVA successfully introduced new agricultural methods into traditional farming communities by blending in and finding local champions. Tennessee farmers often rejected advice from TVA officials, so the officials had to find leaders in the communities and convince them that crop rotation and the judicious application of fertilizers could restore soil fertility. Once they had convinced the leaders, the rest followed.

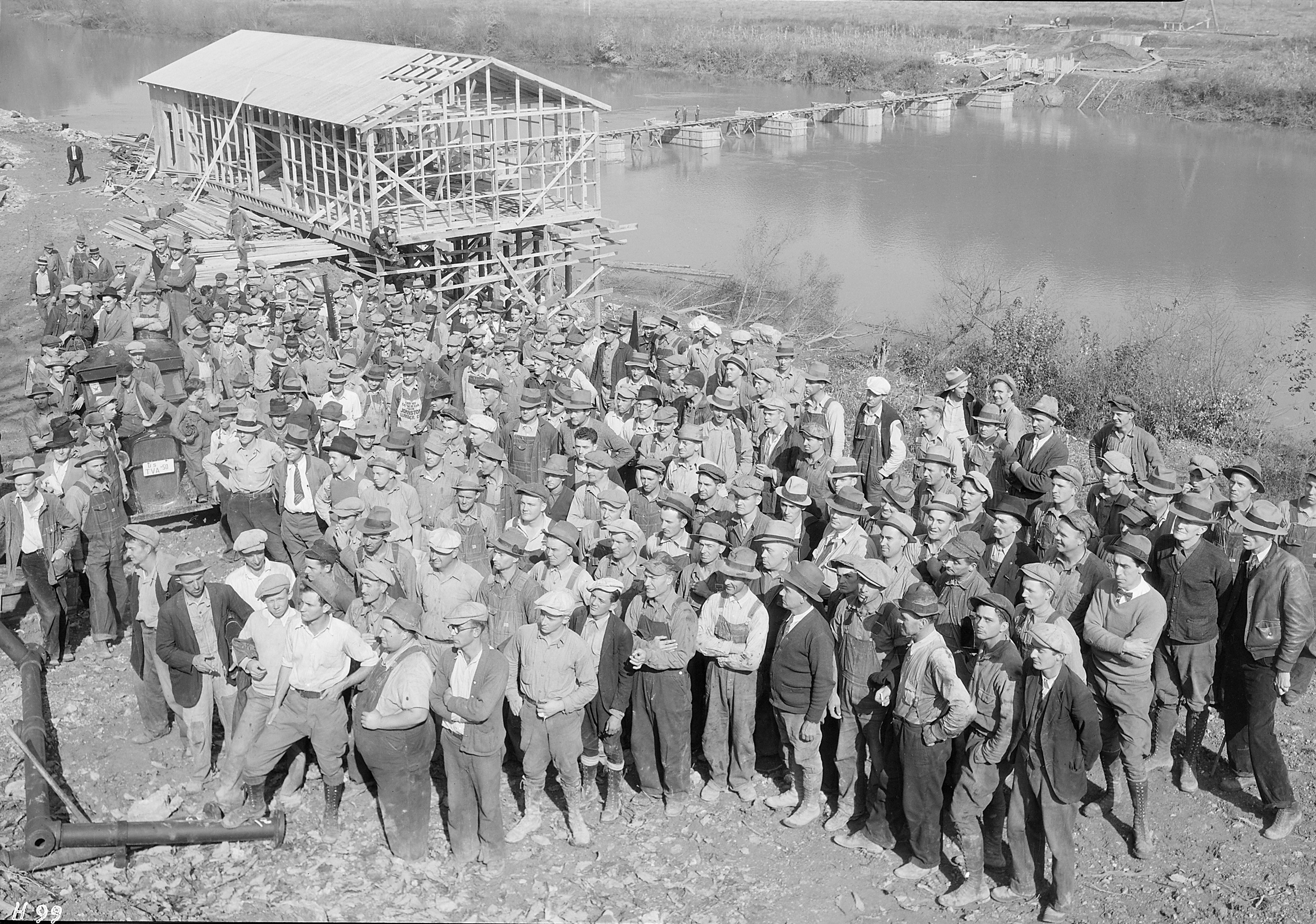
Workers at the site of Norris Dam, the first hydroelectric dam built by the TVA, c. 1933

TVA immediately embarked on the construction of several hydroelectric dams, with the first, Norris Dam in upper East Tennessee, breaking ground on October 1, 1933. These facilities, designed with the intent of also controlling floods, greatly improved the lives of farmers and rural residents, making their lives easier and farms in the Tennessee Valley more productive. They also provided new employment opportunities to the poverty-stricken regions in the Valley. At the same time, however, they required the displacement of more than 125,000 valley residents or roughly 15,000 families, as well as some cemeteries and small towns, which caused some to oppose the projects, especially in rural areas. The projects also inundated several Native American archaeological sites, and graves were reinterred at new locations, along with new tombstones.

The available electricity attracted new industries to the region, including textile mills, providing desperately needed jobs, many of which were filled by women. A few regions of the Tennessee Valley did not receive electricity until the late 1940s and early 1950s, however. TVA was one of the first federal hydropower agencies, and was quickly hailed as a success. While most of the nation's major hydropower systems are federally managed today, other attempts to create similar regional corporate agencies have failed. The most notable was the proposed Columbia Valley Authority for the Columbia River in the Pacific Northwest, which was modeled on the TVA, but did not gain approval.

=== World War II ===
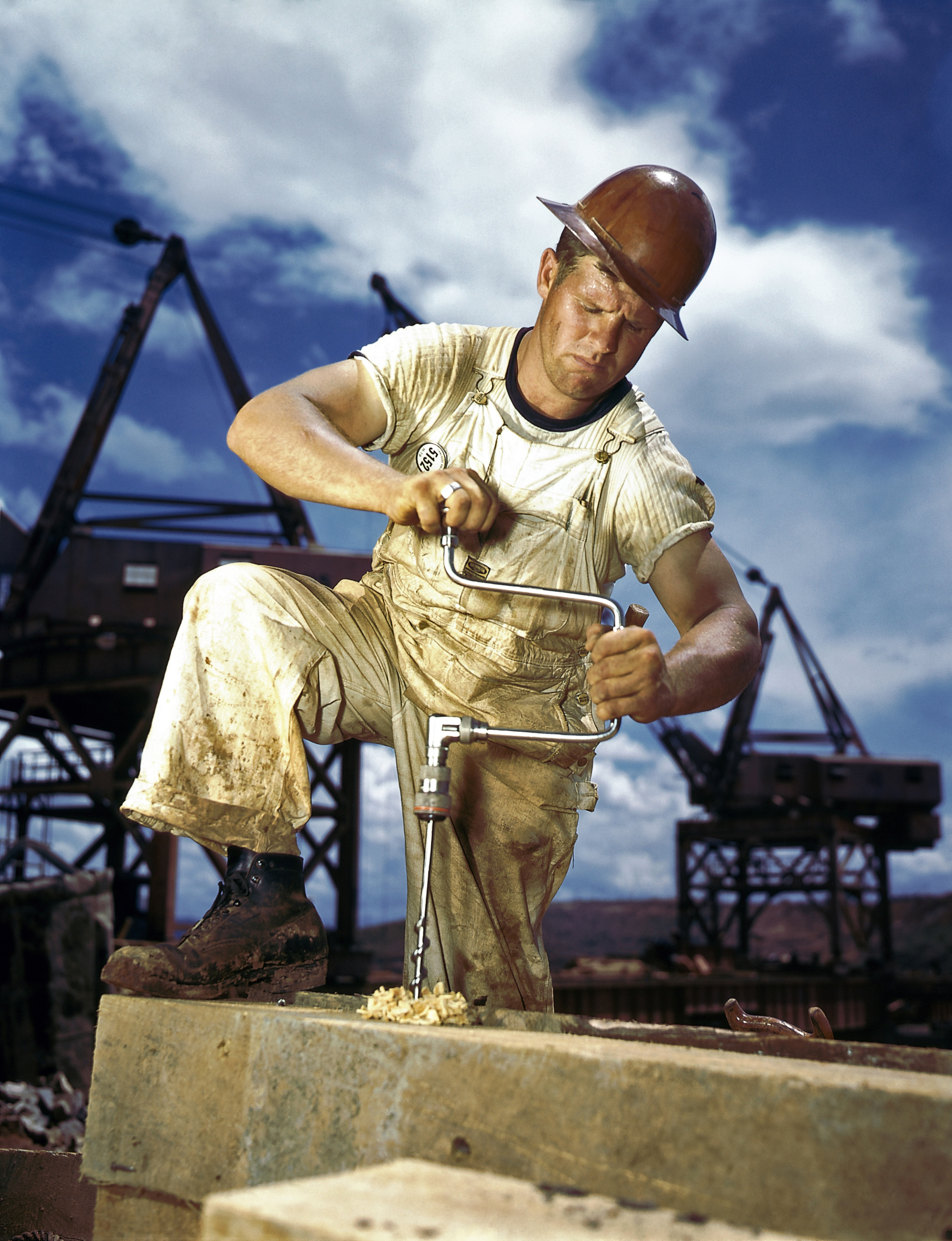
A carpenter, wearing a contractor's employee badge, at work during the 1942 construction of Douglas Dam in East Tennessee

To provide electricity for essential industries during World War II, TVA engaged in one of the largest hydropower construction programs ever undertaken in the U.S. This was especially important for the energy-intensive aluminum industry, which was used in airplanes and munitions. By early 1942, when the effort reached its peak, 12 hydroelectric plants and one coal-fired steam plant were under construction at the same time, and design and construction employment reached 28,000. In its first 11 years, TVA constructed 16 hydroelectric dams. During the war, the agency also provided 60% of the elemental phosphorus used in munitions, produced maps of approximately 500,000 square miles (1,300,000 km^{2}) of foreign territory using aerial reconnaissance, and provided mobile housing for war workers.

The largest project of this period was the Fontana Dam. After negotiations led by then-Vice President Harry Truman, TVA purchased the land from Nantahala Power and Light, a wholly owned subsidiary of Alcoa, and built Fontana Dam. Also in 1942, TVA's first coal-fired plant, the 267-megawatt Watts Bar Steam Plant, began operation. The government originally intended the electricity generated from Fontana to be used by Alcoa factories for the war effort. However, the abundance of TVA power was a major factors in the U.S. Army's decision to locate uranium enrichment facilities in Oak Ridge, Tennessee, for the world's first atomic bombs. This was part of an effort codenamed the Manhattan Project.

=== Increasing power demand ===
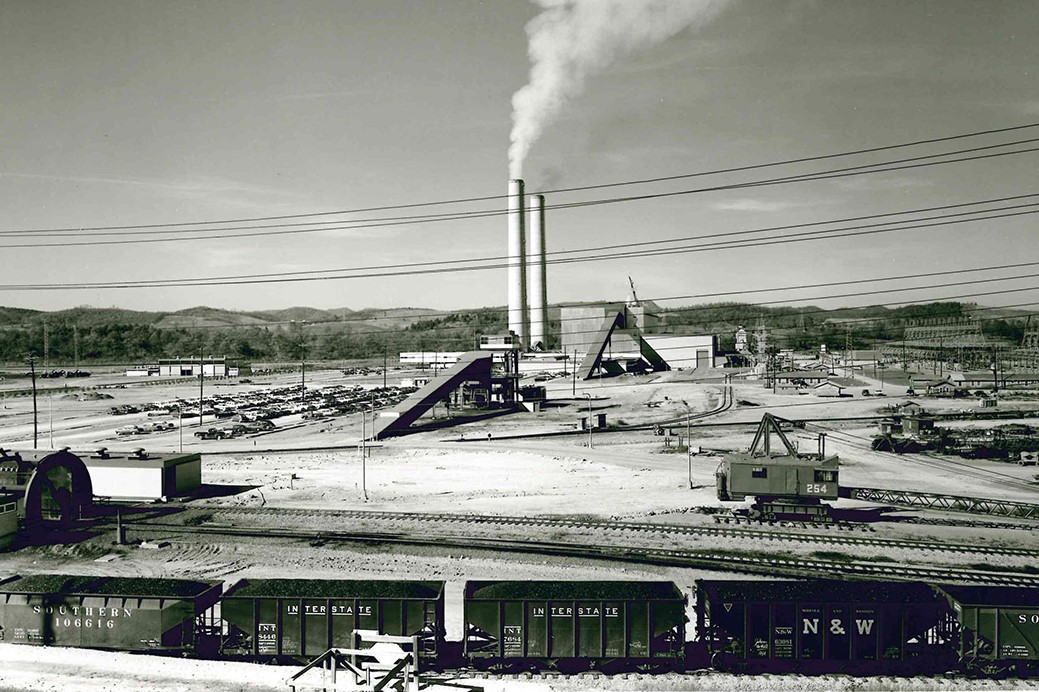
John Sevier Fossil Plant in Hawkins County, Tennessee, c. 1956

By the end of World War II, TVA had completed a 650-mile (1,050 km) navigation channel the length of the Tennessee River and had become the nation's largest electricity supplier. Even so, the demand for electricity was outstripping TVA's capacity to produce power from hydroelectric dams, and so TVA began constructing additional coal-fired plants. Political interference kept TVA from securing additional federal appropriations to do so, so it sought the authority to issue bonds. Several of TVA's coal-fired plants, including Johnsonville, Widows Creek, Shawnee, Kingston, Gallatin, and John Sevier, began operations in the 1950s. In 1955, coal surpassed hydroelectricity as TVA's top generating source. On August 6, 1959, President Dwight D. Eisenhower signed into law an amendment to the TVA act, making the agency self-financing. During the 1950s, TVA's generating capacity nearly quadrupled.

The 1960s were years of further unprecedented economic growth in the Tennessee Valley. Capacity growth during this time slowed, but ultimately increased 56% between 1960 and 1970. To handle a projected future increase in electrical consumption, TVA began constructing 500 kilovolt (kV) transmission lines, the first of which was placed into service on May 15, 1965. Electric rates were among the nation's lowest during this time and stayed low as TVA brought larger, more efficient generating units into service. Plants completed during this time included Paradise, Bull Run, and Nickajack Dam. Expecting the valley's electric power needs to continue to surge, TVA began building nuclear power plants in 1966. The following year, TVA began work on Tellico Dam, which was initially conceived in the 1930s and later became its most controversial project.

=== Financial problems, Tellico Dam, and restructuring ===
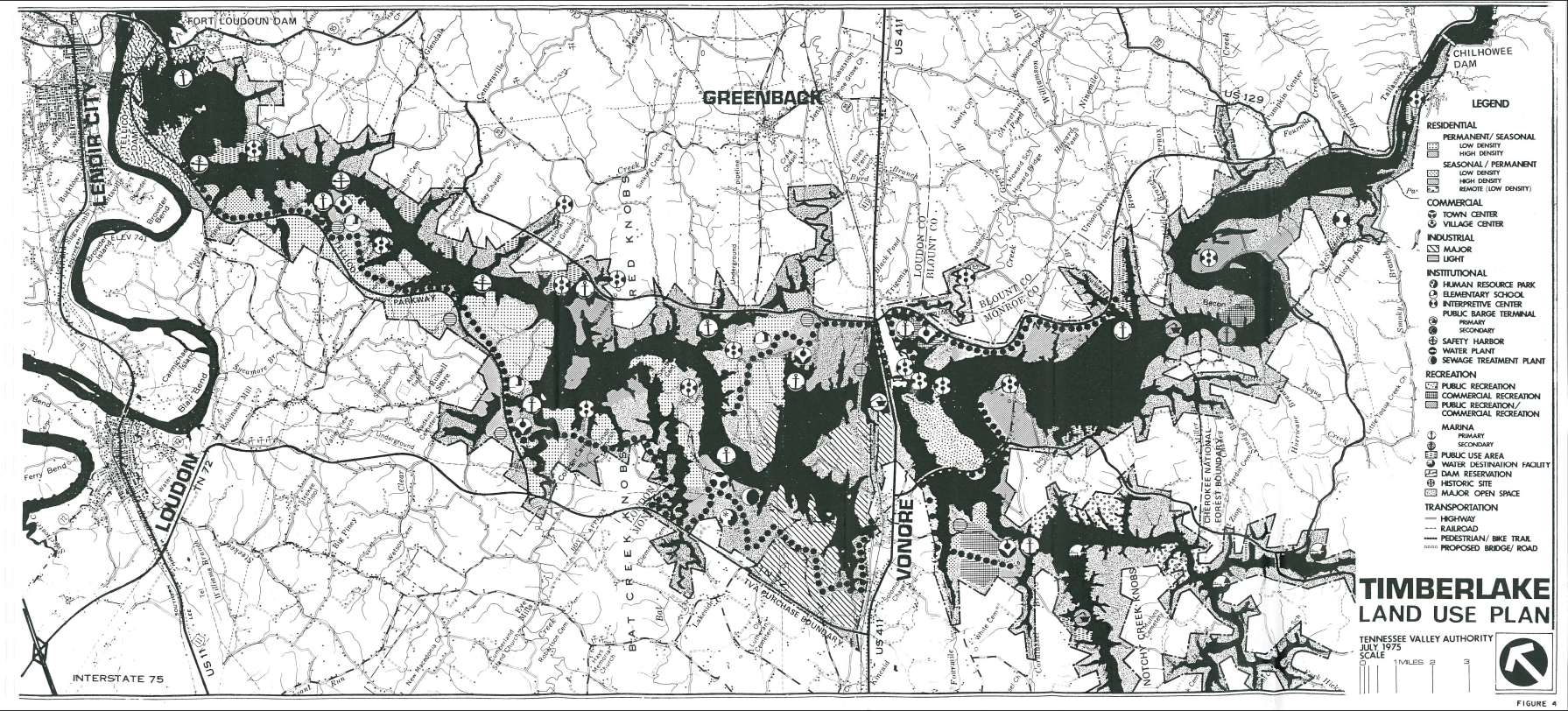
Considered as one of the TVA's most ambitious projects, Timberlake, a planned city along the Tellico Reservoir was proposed to support 30,000 residents. The project was cancelled soon after the Tellico Project's controversy.

During the 1970s, significant changes occurred in the economy of the Tennessee Valley and the nation, prompted by energy crises in 1973 and 1979 and accelerating fuel costs throughout the decade. The average cost of electricity in the Tennessee Valley increased fivefold from the early 1970s to the early 1980s. TVA's first nuclear reactor, Browns Ferry Unit 1, began commercial operation on August 1, 1974. Between 1970 and 1974, TVA set out to construct 17 nuclear reactors, based on projections of continued rapid power demand increases. However, in the 1980s, it became increasingly evident that the agency had vastly overestimated the valley's future energy needs, and rapid construction cost inflation and new regulations following the Three Mile Island accident posed additional obstacles to this undertaking. In 1981, the board voted to defer the Phipps Bend plant, as well as to slow construction on all other projects. The Hartsville and Yellow Creek plants were cancelled in 1984 and Bellefonte in 1988. Citing safety concerns, all of TVA's five operating nuclear reactors were indefinitely shut down in 1985 with the two at Sequoyah coming back online three years later and Browns Ferry's three reactors coming back online in 1991, 1995, and 2007.

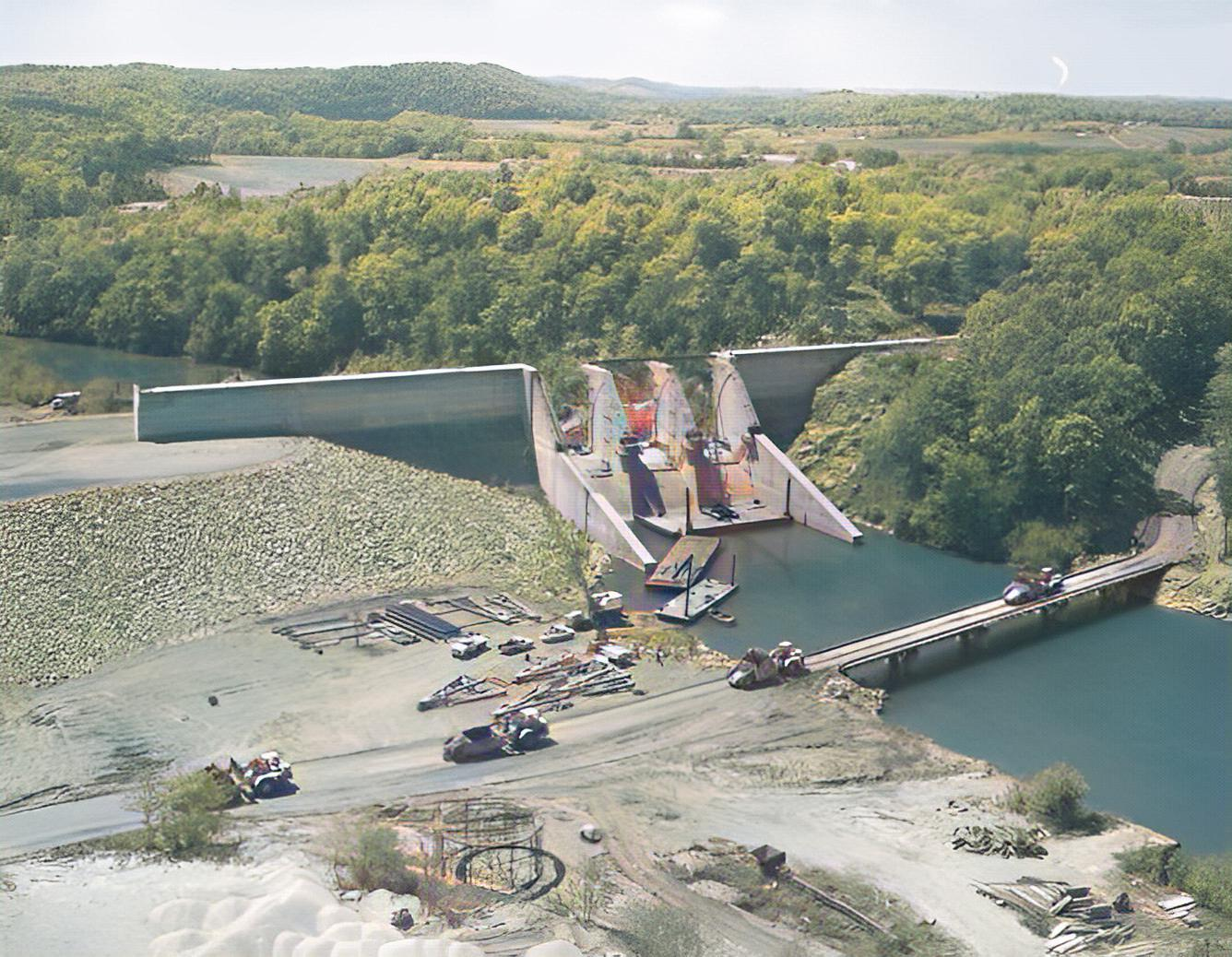
Construction on Tellico Dam

Construction of Tellico Dam raised political and environmental concerns, as laws had changed since early development in the valley. Scientists and other researchers had become more aware of the massive environmental effects of the dams and new lakes, and worried about preserving habitats and species. The Tellico Dam project was initially delayed because of concern over the snail darter, a small ray-finned fish which was discovered in the Little Tennessee River in 1973 and listed as an endangered species two years later. A lawsuit was filed under the Endangered Species Act and the U.S. Supreme Court ruled in favor of protecting the snail darter in Tennessee Valley Authority v. Hill in 1978. The project's main motive was to support recreational and tourism development, unlike earlier dams constructed by TVA. Land acquired by eminent domain for the Tellico Dam and its reservoir that encountered minimal inundation was sold to private developers for construction of present-day Tellico Village, a planned retirement community.

The inflation crises of the 1970s and early 1980s, combined with cancellation of several planned nuclear plants, put the agency in deep financial trouble. In an effort to restructure and improve efficiency and financial stability, TVA began shifting towards a more corporate environment in the later 1980s. Marvin Travis Runyon, a former corporate executive in the automotive industry, became chairman of the TVA in January 1988, and pledged to stabilize the agency financially. During his four-year term he worked to reduce management layers, and cut overhead costs by more than 30%. This required laying off thousands of workers and transferring many operations to private contractors. These moves resulted in cumulative savings and efficiency improvements of $1.8 billion (equivalent to $3.7 billion in 2025). His tenure also saw three of the agency's five nuclear reactors return to service, and a rate freeze that lasted 10 years.

=== Early 1990s to late 2010s ===
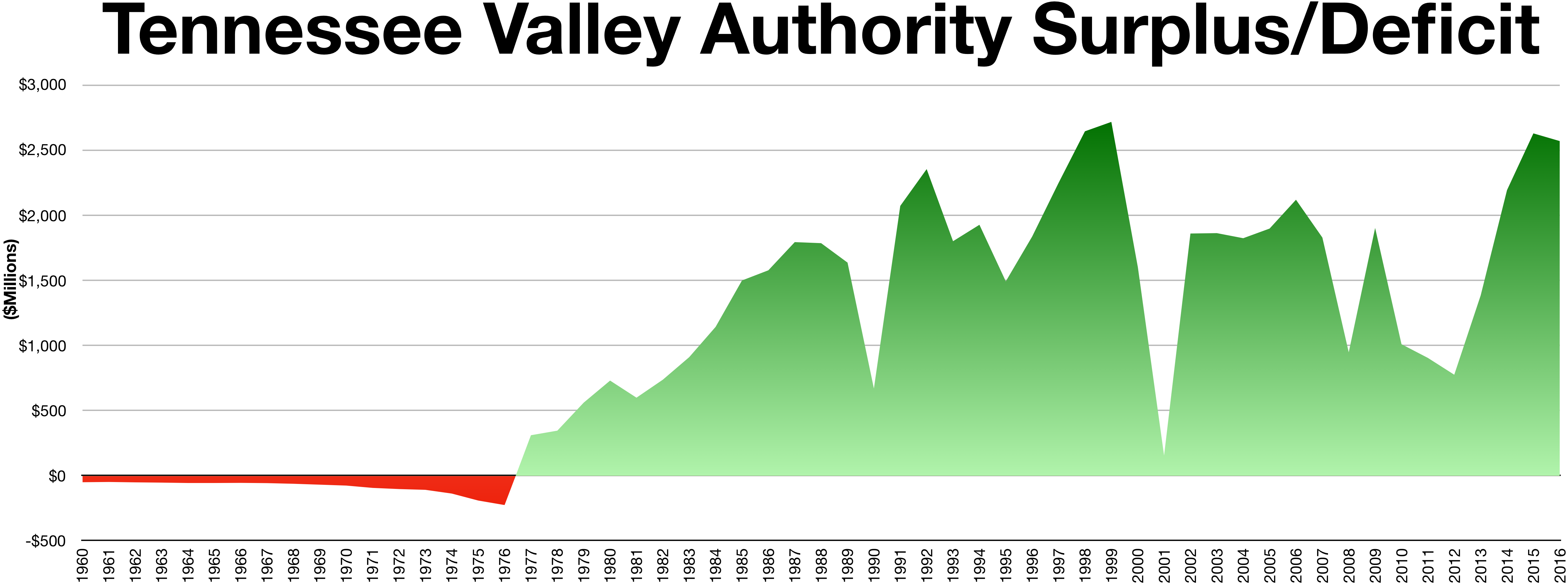
Tennessee Valley Authority Surplus/Deficit

As the electric-utility industry moved toward restructuring and deregulation, TVA began preparing for competition. It cut operating costs by nearly $800 million a year, reduced its workforce by more than half, increased the generating capacity of its plants, and developed a plan to meet the energy needs of the Tennessee Valley through 2020.

In 1992, work resumed on Watts Bar Unit 1, and the reactor began operation in May 1996. This was the last commercial nuclear reactor in the United States completed in the 20th century. In 2002, TVA began work to restart Browns Ferry Unit 1, the last of TVA's reactors mothballed in 1985. This unit returned to service in 2007. In 2004, TVA implemented recommendations from the Reservoir Operations Study (ROS) on how it operates the Tennessee River system. In 2005, the company announced its intention to construct an Advanced Pressurized Water Reactor at its Bellefonte site in Alabama, filing the necessary applications in November 2007. This proposal was gradually trimmed over the following years, and essentially voided by 2016. In October 2007, construction resumed on Watts Bar Unit 2. which began commercial operation in October 2016. Watts Bar Unit 2 was the first new nuclear reactor to enter service in the United States in the 21st century.

Aerial footage of the Kingston Fossil Plant coal fly ash slurry spill, the largest environmental disaster in American history

On December 22, 2008, an earthen dike impounding a coal ash pond at TVA's Kingston Fossil Plant failed, releasing 1.1 billion US gallons (4,200,000 m^{3}) of coal ash slurry across 300 acres (1.2 km^{2}) of land and into two tributaries of the Tennessee River. The spill, of which cleanup was completed in 2015 at a cost of more than $1 billion, was the largest industrial spill in United States history, and considered one of the worst environmental disasters of all time. A 2009 report by engineering firm AECOM found that multiple inadequate design factors of the ash pond were responsible for the spill, and in August 2012, TVA was found liable for the disaster by the U.S. District Court for the Eastern District of Tennessee. The initial spill resulted in no injuries or deaths, but several employees of an engineering firm hired by TVA to clean up the spill developed illnesses, some of which were fatal. In November 2018, a federal jury ruled that the contractor did not properly inform the workers about the dangers of exposure to coal ash and failed to provide them with necessary personal protective equipment.

In 2009, to gain more access to sustainable green energy, TVA signed 20-year power purchase agreements with Maryland-based CVP Renewable Energy Co. and Chicago-based Invenergy Wind LLC for electricity generated by wind farms. In April 2011, TVA reached an agreement with the Environmental Protection Agency (EPA), four state governments, and three environmental groups to drastically reduce pollution and carbon emissions. Under the terms of the agreement, TVA was required to retire at least 18 of its 59 coal-fired units by the end of 2018, and install scrubbers in several others or convert them to make them cleaner, at a cost of $25 billion, by 2021. As a result, TVA closed several of its coal-fired power plants in the 2010s, converting some to natural gas. These include John Sevier in 2012, Shawnee Unit 10 in 2014, Widows Creek in 2015, Colbert in 2016, Johnsonville and Paradise Units 1 and 2 in 2017, Allen in 2018, and Paradise Unit 3 in 2020.

=== Recent history ===
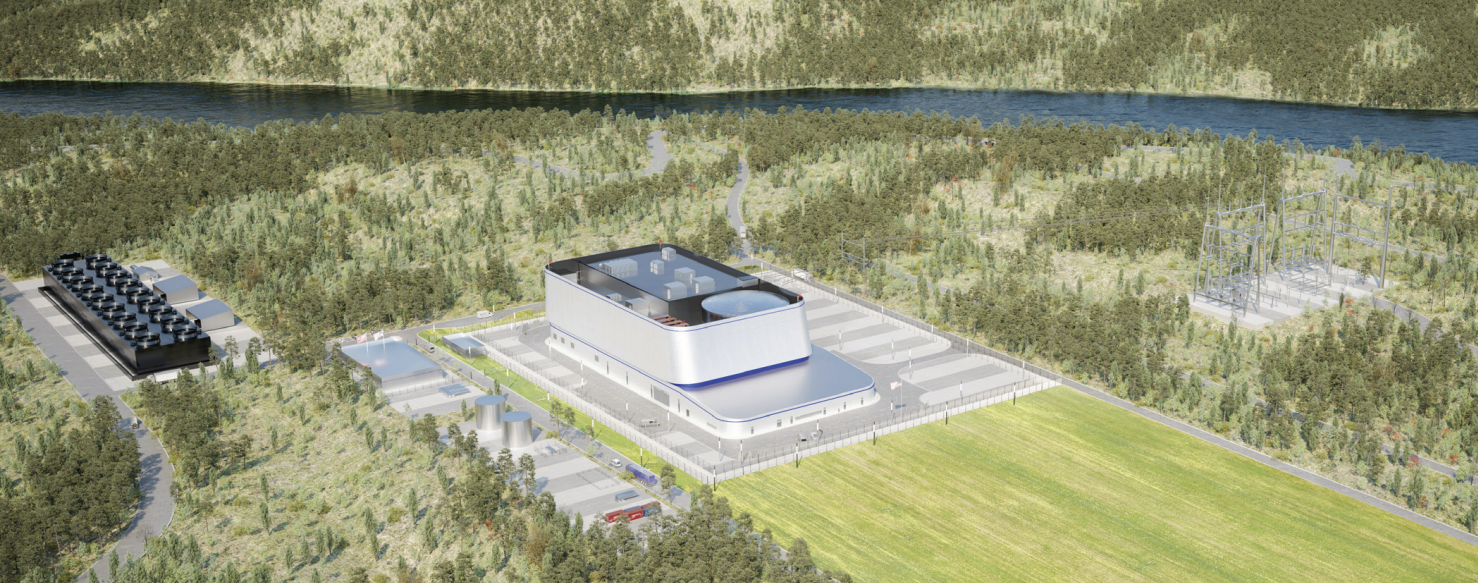
Artistic rendering of the small modular reactor (SMR) facility at the Clinch River Nuclear Site, the first of several to be constructed as part of TVA's New Nuclear Program approved in early 2022

In 2018, TVA opened a new cybersecurity center in its downtown Chattanooga office complex. More than 20 information technology specialists monitor emails, social media, and network activity for cybersecurity and grid security threats. Across TVA's digital platform, two billion activities occur each day. The center is staffed 24 hours a day to spot any threats to TVA's transmission grid.

Given continued economic pressure on the coal industry, the TVA board defied President Donald Trump and voted in February 2019 to close two aging coal plants, Paradise Unit 3 and Bull Run. TVA chief executive Bill Johnson said the decision was not about coal, per se, but rather "about keeping rates as low as feasible". They stated that decommissioning the two plants would reduce its carbon output by about 4.4% annually. TVA announced in April 2021 plans to completely phase out coal power by 2035. The following month, the board voted to consider replacing almost all of their operating coal facilities with combined-cycle gas plants. Such plants considered for gas plant redevelopment include the Cumberland, Gallatin, Shawnee, and Kingston facilities.

In early February 2020, TVA awarded an outside company, Framatome, several multi-million-dollar contracts for work across the company's nuclear reactor fleet. This includes fuel for the Browns Ferry Nuclear Plant, fuel handling equipment upgrades across the fleet, and steam generator replacements at the Watts Bar Nuclear Plant. Framatome provided its ATRIUM 11 fuel for the three boiling water reactors at Browns Ferry. This contract makes TVA the third U.S. utility to switch to the ATRIUM 11 fuel design. On August 3, 2020, President Trump fired the TVA chairman and another board member, saying they were overpaid and had outsourced 200 high-tech jobs. The move came after U.S. Tech Workers, a nonprofit that works to limit visas given to foreign technology workers, criticized the TVA for laying off its own workers and replacing them with contractors using foreign workers with H-1B visas.

Citing its aspiration to reach net-zero carbon emissions in 2050, the TVA Board voted to approve an advanced approach of nuclear energy technology with an estimated $200 million investment, known as the New Nuclear Program (NNP) in February 2022. This would promote the construction of new nuclear power facilities, particularly small modular reactors, with the first facility being constructed in partnership with Oak Ridge National Laboratory at the Clinch River Nuclear Site in Oak Ridge. In December 2025, the United States Department of Energy allocated TVA a grant of $400 million to assist in deployment of advanced light-water SMRs; TVA is planning to build a BWRX-300 SMR.

On December 23, 2022, TVA had several hours of rolling blackouts due to the late December 2022 North American winter storm. As many as 24,000 Nashville Electric Service customers were without power, with thousands more from smaller distributors affected as well.

== Criticism and controversies ==
=== Allegations of federal government overreach ===
TVA was heralded by New Dealers and the New Deal Coalition not only as a successful economic development program for a depressed area but also as a democratic nation-building effort overseas because of its alleged grassroots inclusiveness as articulated by director David E. Lilienthal. However, the TVA was controversial early on, as some believed its creation was an overreach by the federal government.

Supporters of TVA note that the agency's management of the Tennessee River system without appropriated federal funding saves taxpayers millions of dollars annually. Opponents, such as Dean Russell in The TVA Idea, in addition to condemning the project as being socialistic, argued that TVA created a "hidden loss" by preventing the creation of "factories and jobs that would have come into existence if the government had allowed the taxpayers to spend their money as they wished". Defenders note that TVA remains overwhelmingly popular in Tennessee among conservatives and liberals alike. Business historian Thomas McCraw concludes that Roosevelt "rescued the [power] industry from its own abuses" but "he might have done this much with a great deal less agitation and ill will". New Dealers hoped to build numerous other federal utility corporations around the country but were defeated by lobbyists and 1940 Republican presidential nominee Wendell Willkie and the conservative coalition in Congress. The valley authority model did not replace the limited-purpose water programs of the Bureau of Reclamation and the Army Corps of Engineers.

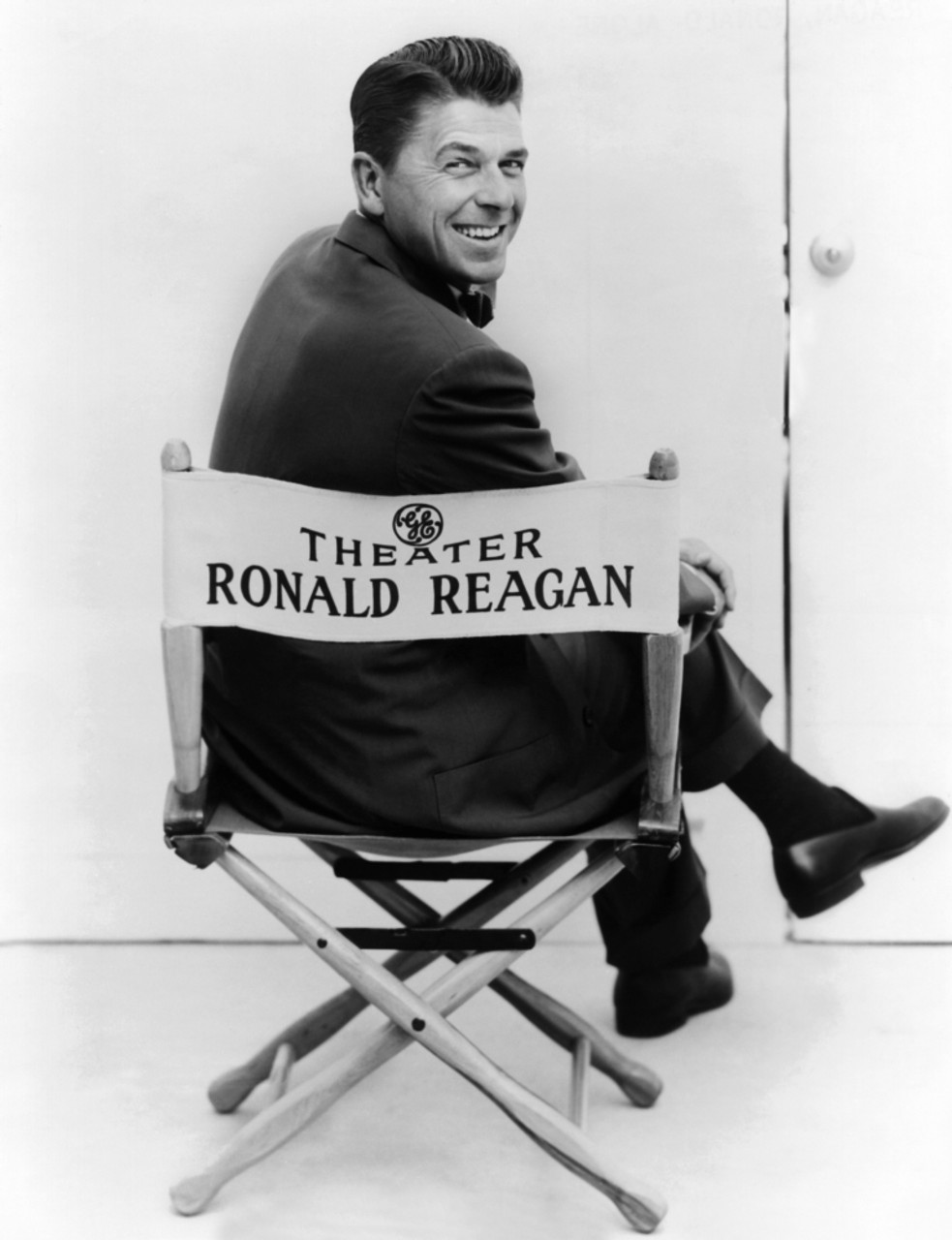
Ronald Reagan was fired from General Electric Theater after criticizing TVA as a problem of "big government"

However, it has been shown that in river policy, the strength of opposing interest groups also mattered. The TVA bill was able to attain passage because reformers like Norris skillfully coordinated action at potential choke points and weakened the already disorganized opponents among the electric power industry lobbyists. In 1936, after regrouping, opposing river lobbyists and members of congress who were part of the conservative coalition took advantage of the New Dealers' spending mood by expanding the Army Corps' flood control program. They also helped defeat further valley authorities, the most promising of the New Deal water policy reforms. When Democrats after 1945 began proclaiming the Tennessee Valley Authority as a model for countries in the developing world to follow, conservative critics charged that it was a top-heavy, centralized, technocratic venture that displaced locals and did so in insensitive ways. Thus, when the program was used as the basis for modernization programs in various parts of the third world during the Cold War, such as in the Mekong Delta in Vietnam, its failure brought a backlash of cynicism toward modernization programs that has persisted.

In 1953, President Dwight D. Eisenhower referred to the TVA as an example of "creeping socialism". The following year, then-film actor and later 40th President Ronald Reagan began hosting General Electric Theater, which was sponsored by General Electric (GE). He was fired in 1962 after publicly referring to the TVA, which was a major customer for GE turbines, as one of the problems of "big government". Some claim that Reagan was instead fired due to a criminal antitrust investigation involving him and the Screen Actors Guild. However, Reagan was only interviewed; nobody was actually charged with anything in the investigation. In 1963, U.S. Senator and Republican presidential candidate Barry Goldwater was quoted in a Saturday Evening Post article by Stewart Alsop as saying, "You know, I think we ought to sell TVA." He had called for sale of particular parts of the authority, including its fertilizer production and steam-generation facilities, to private companies because "it would be better operated and would be of more benefit for more people if it were part of private industry." Goldwater's quotation was used against him in a TV advertisement by Doyle Dane Bernbach for then-President Lyndon B. Johnson's 1964 campaign, which depicted an auction taking place atop a dam and promised that Johnson would not sell TVA.

==== Legal challenges ====
The TVA has faced multiple constitutional challenges. The United States Supreme Court ruled TVA to be constitutional in Ashwander v. Tennessee Valley Authority (297 U.S. 288) in 1936. The court noted that regulating interstate commerce includes regulation of streams and that controlling floods is required for keeping streams navigable. It also upheld the constitutionality of the TVA under the War Powers Clause, seeing its activities as a means of assuring the electric supply for the manufacture of munitions in the event of war. The argument before the court was that electricity generation was a by-product of navigation and flood control and therefore could be considered constitutional. The CEO of the Tennessee Electric Power Company (TEPCO), Jo Conn Guild, was vehemently opposed to the creation of TVA, and with the help of attorney Wendell Willkie, challenged the constitutionality of the TVA Act in federal court. The Supreme Court again upheld the TVA Act in its 1939 decision Tennessee Electric Power Company v. TVA. On August 16, 1939, TEPCO was forced to sell its assets, including Hales Bar Dam, Ocoee Dams 1 and 2, Blue Ridge Dam and Great Falls Dam to TVA for $78 million (equivalent to $1.41 billion in 2025).

=== Discrimination ===
In 1981 the TVA Board of Directors broke with previous tradition and took a hard line against white-collar unions during contract negotiations. As a result, a class action suit was filed in 1984 in U.S. District Court charging the agency with sex discrimination under Title VII of the Civil Rights Act of 1964 based on the large number of women in one of the pay grades negatively impacted by the new contract. TVA reached an out-of-court settlement in 1987, in which they agreed to contract modifications and paid the group $5 million (equivalent to $12.1 million in 2025), but denied wrongdoing.

=== Eminent domain and resident removal ===
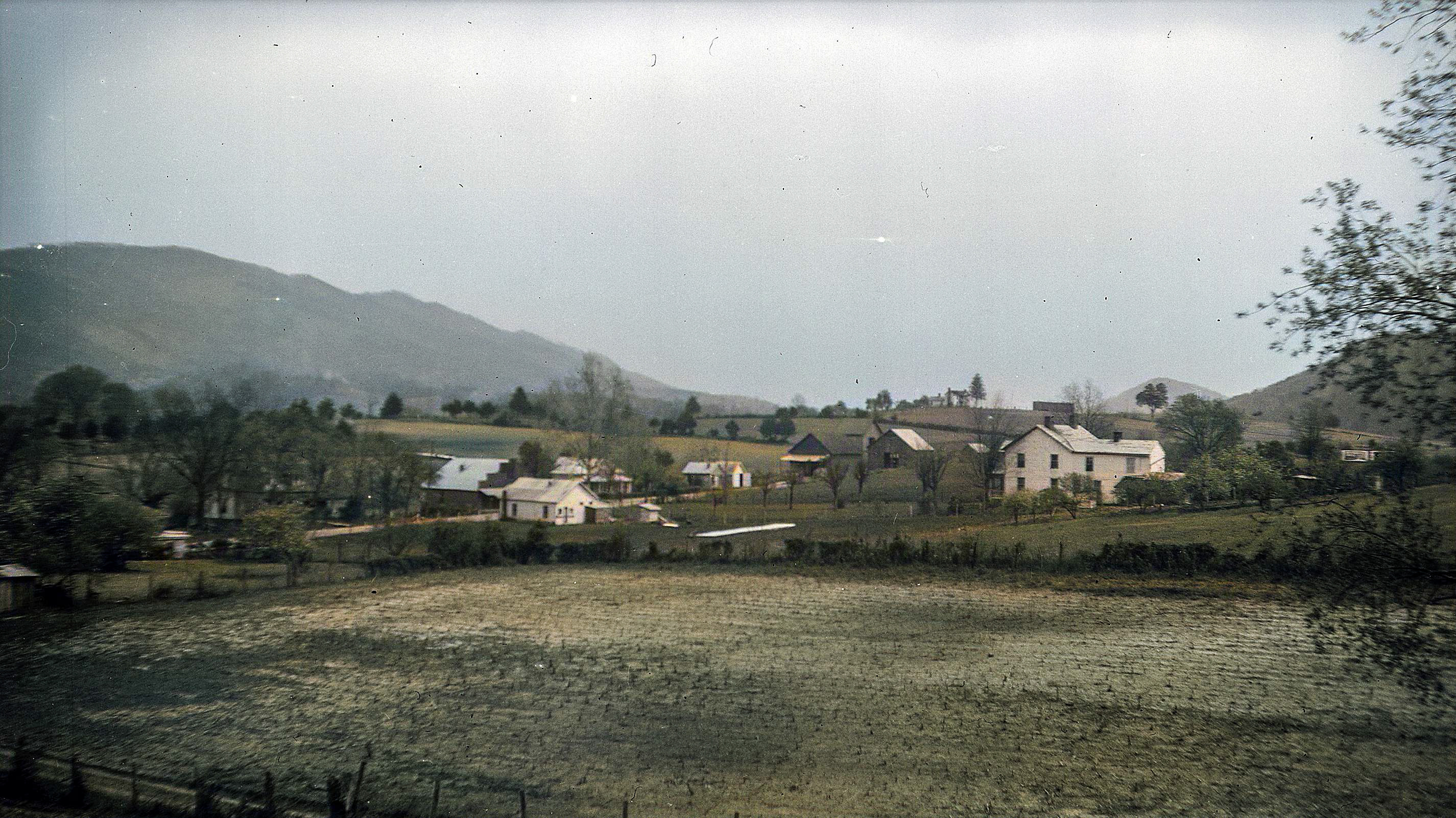
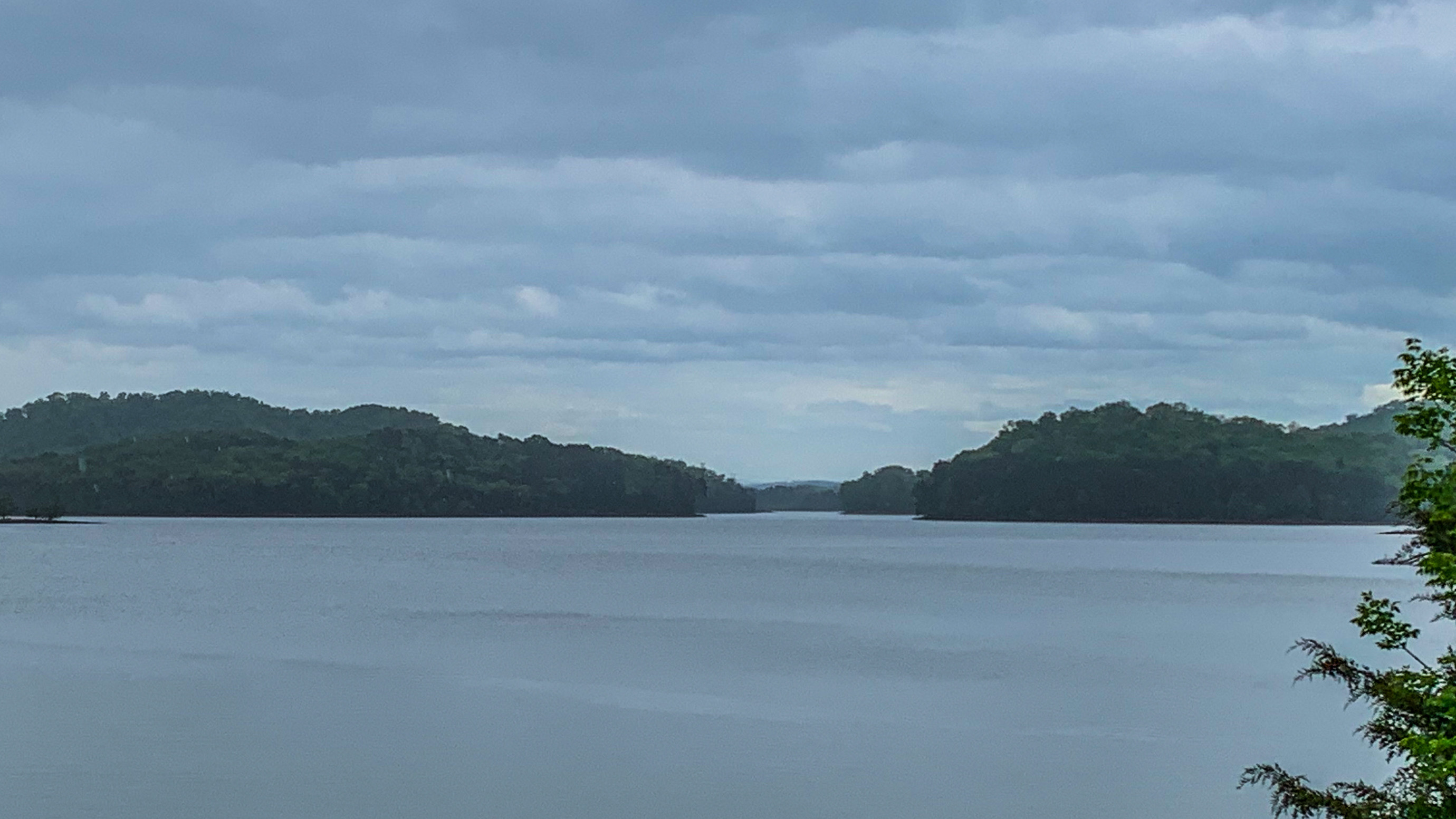
The historically significant town of Bean Station, Tennessee, was among the largest of communities inundated by the TVA, with nearly 90% of its population removed by eminent domain or federal lawsuits for the construction of Cherokee Dam.

The TVA has received criticism throughout its entire history for what some have perceived as excessive use of its authority of eminent domain, an unwillingness to compromise with landowners, and the abuse of property rights. All of the TVA's hydroelectric projects were made possible through the use of eminent domain, and displaced more than 125,000 Tennessee Valley residents. Residents who initially refused to sell their land were often forced to do so via court orders and lawsuits. Many of these projects also inundated historic Native American sites and early Colonial-era settlements. Historians have claimed that the TVA forced residents to sell their property at values less than the fair market value, and indirectly destabilized the real estate market for farmland. Some displaced residents committed suicide, unable to bear the events. On some occasions, land that the TVA had acquired through eminent domain that was expected to be flooded by reservoirs was not flooded, and was instead given away to private developers for tourism and residential developments. During TVA land auctions, the previous landowners were often unable to qualify to bid in auctions on their former properties.

=== Executive compensation ===
TVA CEO Jeff Lyash's compensation package of $10,500,000 in 2024 has generated much criticism.

== In popular culture ==
Comic book writer and artist Walt Simonson attributed the TVA to his naming of the Time Variance Authority, a fictional organization in the Marvel Comics in the 1980s' run of The Mighty Thor comic book series, in Marvel Studios' Marvel Cinematic Universe in the television series Loki, and the 2024 film Deadpool & Wolverine. Simonson was born in Knoxville and briefly lived there; he cited stories told by his father, who worked as a soil scientist alongside the TVA, about their role in economic development of the Tennessee Valley region. Simonson cited them as being the inspiration for the fictional organization.

The 1960 film Wild River, directed by Elia Kazan, tells the story about a family forced to relocate from their land, which has been owned by their ancestors for generations, after TVA plans to construct a dam which will flood it. While fictional, the film depicts the real-life experiences of many people forced to give up their land to TVA to make way for hydroelectric projects, and was mostly inspired by the removal of families for the Norris Dam project. The 1970 James Dickey novel Deliverance and its 1972 film adaptation focuses on four Atlanta businessmen taking a canoeing trip down a river that is being impounded by an electric utility, nodding to the TVA's early and controversial hydroelectric projects. The 1984 Mark Rydell film The River focuses on an East Tennessee family being confronted by the loss of their ancestral farm from the inundation of a nearby river by an electric utility. The film, shot on farmland near the Holston River in Hawkins County, used flooding practical effects provided by the TVA. In the 2000 film O Brother, Where Art Thou?, the family home of the protagonist, played by George Clooney, is flooded by a reservoir constructed by the TVA. This plays a central role in the pacing of the film and the broader Depression-era Mississippi context of the narrative.

"Song of the South" by Alabama, a country and Southern rock band, features the lyrics "Papa got a job with the TVA" following the lyrics "Well momma got sick and daddy got down, The county got the farm and they moved to town" expressing the hardships and changes that southerners faced during the post recession era. The TVA and its impact on the region are featured in the Drive-By Truckers' songs "TVA" and "Uncle Frank". In "TVA", the singer reflects on time spent with family members and a girlfriend at Wilson Dam. In "Uncle Frank", the lyrics tell the story of an unnamed hydroelectric dam being built, and the effects on the community that would become flooded upon its completion. In 2012, Jason Isbell released a solo cover of "TVA".

== See also ==
- Appalachian Regional Commission
- Environmental history of the United States
- Helmand and Arghandab Valley Authority, modelled on the TVA
- James Bay Energy Corporation, a Crown corporation of the Quebec government for developing the James Bay Project for building various dams on rivers
- List of navigation authorities in the United States
- Muscle Shoals Bill
- Nashville Electric Service
- New Deal
- Norris, Tennessee
- Tennessee Valley Authority Police
- Tennessee Valley Authority v. Hill

== Bibliography ==
- Barde, Robert E. "Arthur E. Morgan, First Chairman of TVA" Tennessee Historical Quarterly 30#3 (1971), pp. 299–314 online Archived March 16, 2024, at the Wayback Machine
- Colignon, Richard A. (1997). Power Plays: Critical Events in the Institutionalism of the Tennessee Valley Authority. SUNY series in the sociology of work. Albany, NY: State University of New York Press. ISBN 978-0-585-07708-6. OCLC 42855981.
- Creese, Walter L. (1990). TVA's public planning: The vision, the reality. Knoxville: University of Tennessee Press. ISBN 978-0-87049-638-7. OCLC 476873440 – via Internet Archive.
- Culvahouse, Tim, ed. (2007). The Tennessee Valley Authority: Design and persuasion. New York: Princeton Architectural Press. OCLC 929309559.
- Drumright, William Wade. "A river for war, a watershed to change: The Tennessee Valley Authority during World War II" (PhD dissertation, University of Tennessee, 2005) online Archived August 23, 2025, at the Wayback Machine.
- Hargrove, Erwin C.; Conkin, Paul K., eds. (1983). TVA: Fifty years of grass-roots bureaucracy. Urbana, IL: University of Illinois Press. ISBN 978-0-252-01086-6. OCLC 474377514 – via Internet Archive.
- Hargrove, Erwin C. (1994). Prisoners of myth: the leadership of the Tennessee Valley Authority, 1933–1990. Princeton Studies in American Politics: Historical, International, and Comparative Perspectives. Princeton, NJ: Princeton Univ. Press. doi:10.2307/j.ctt7rvbh. ISBN 978-0-691-03467-6. JSTOR j.ctt7rvbh – via Internet Archive.
- Kull, Donald C. (Winter 1949). "Decentralized Budget Administration in the Tennessee Valley Authority". Public Administration Review. 9 (1): 30–35. doi:10.2307/972660. ISSN 0033-3352. JSTOR 972660. OCLC 5544417850.
- Lilienthal, David E. (1953). TVA: Democracy on the march. New York: Harper & Row – via Internet Archive.
- Morgan, Arthur E. (1974). The making of the TVA. Buffalo, New York: Prometheus Books. ISBN 978-0-87975-034-3. OCLC 607606121 – via Internet Archive.
- Neuse, Steven M. (1996). David E. Lilienthal: The Journey of an American Liberal. Knoxville, Tennessee: The University of Tennessee Press. ISBN 0-87049-940-8. Archived from the original on June 24, 2023 – via Google Books.
- Neuse, Steven M. (2004). "Tennessee Valley Authority (TVA)". In McElvaine, Robert S. (ed.). Encyclopedia of Great Depression. Farmington Hills, Michigan: Macmillan Reference USA.
- Neuse, Steven M. (November–December 1983). "TVA at Age Fifty—Reflections and Retrospect". Public Administration Review. 43 (6): 491–499. doi:10.2307/975916. ISSN 0033-3352. JSTOR 975916. OCLC 5550047671.
- Neuse, Steven M. (1996). David E. Lilienthal: the journey of an American liberal. Knoxville: University of Tennessee Press. ISBN 978-0-87049-940-1. OCLC 243857932.
- Russell, Dean (1949). The TVA idea. Irvington-on-Hudson, New York: Foundation for Economic Education. OCLC 564022. Archived from the original on June 24, 2023 – via Google Books.
- Talbert, Roy Jr. (1987). FDR's Utopian: Arthur Morgan of the TVA. Jackson, Mississippi: University Press of Mississippi. ISBN 0-87805-301-8. Archived from the original on June 24, 2023 – via Google Books.
- Wilson, Marshall A. (1982). Tales From the Grass Roots of TVA, 1933-1952. Knoxville, Tennessee: Wilson Publishing. OCLC 1011650240.
