= List of power stations in Washington, D.C. =

Sources of Washington, D.C. utility-scale electricity generation in gigawatt-hours, full-year 2025:
1. Natural gas: 88 (46.6%)
2. Solar: 51 (27.0%)
3. Biomass: 50 (26.5%)

This is a list of electricity-generating power stations in the U.S. federal district of Washington, D.C., sorted by type and name. In 2024, Washington, D.C. had a total summer capacity of 62 megawatts through all of its power plants, and a net generation of 187,195 megawatt-hours (MWh). In 2025, the electrical energy generation mix was 46.6% natural gas, 27% solar, and 26.5% biomass. Small-scale solar, including customer-owned photovoltaic panels, delivered an additional net 332,000 MWh to the district's electrical grid. This compares as more than six times the amount generated by Washington, D.C.'s utility-scale solar plants.

== Biomass power stations ==
Name	Coordinates	Capacity (MW)	Owner	Type	Year	Ref
Walt Bailey Bioenergy Facility	38°49′14″N 77°01′06″W	10	DC Water	Biogas	2015	

== Natural gas power stations ==
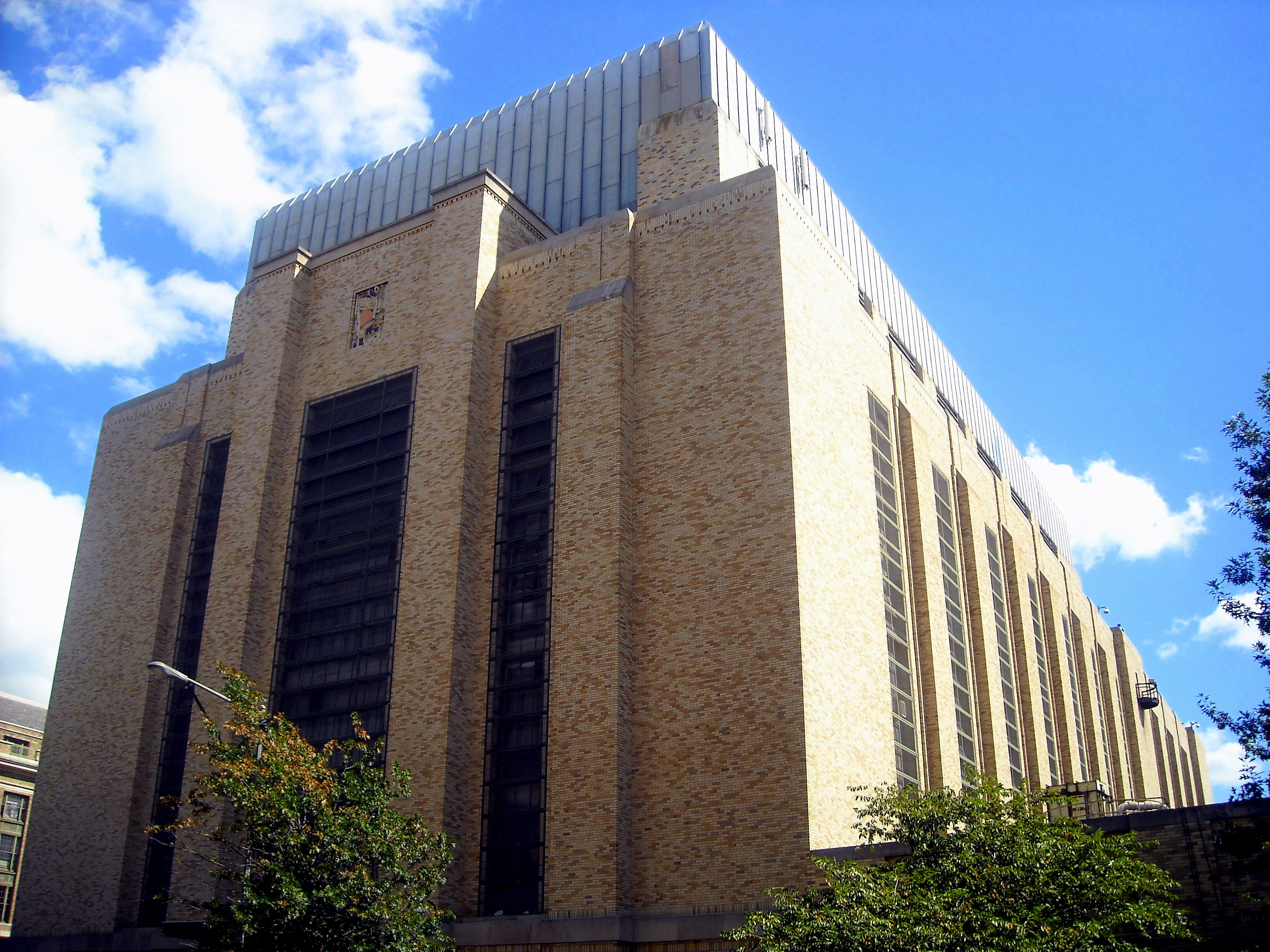
Central Heating Plant in 2008.

Name	Coordinates	Capacity (MW)	Owner	Year	Ref
Capitol Power Plant	38°52′58″N 77°00′27″W		Architect of the Capitol		
Central Heating Plant	38°53′09″N 77°01′42″W		General Services Administration	1934	
Ross Hall Central Utility Plant	38°54′01″N 77°03′03″W		George Washington University		

== Solar power stations ==
Name	Coordinates	Capacity (MW)	Owner	Year	Ref
CUA West Campus Solar Array	38°56′07″N 77°00′09″W	7.5	Standard Solar, Catholic University of America	2024	
IGS Catholic Charities Solar Array	38°56′10″N 76°58′05″W		Greenbacker Renewable Energy Corporation	2020	
JBAB - Washington DC	38°51′10″N 77°00′33″W	7.0	Joint Base Anacostia–Bolling	2019	
NCS FCPA	38°53′29″N 76°56′25″W		New Columbia Solar	2024	
NCS Paradise	38°54′23″N 76°57′05″W		New Columbia Solar	2024	
Ridgecrest	38°50′49″N 76°58′33″W	2.2	Greenbacker Renewable Energy Corporation	2021	

== Former ==
Name	Coordinates	Capacity (MW)	Owner	Type	Commissioned	Decommissioned	Ref
Benning Road Power Plant	38°53′58″N 76°57′33″W		PEPCO	Coal, Petroleum		2012	
Buzzard Point Power Plant	38°52′04″N 77°00′42″W		PEPCO	Coal, Petroleum	1933	2012	

== See also ==
- Lists of power stations in the United States
