= List of power stations in Rhode Island =

Sources of Rhode Island utility-scale electricity generation in gigawatt-hours, full-year 2025:
1. Natural gas: 8,387 (87.5%)
2. Solar: 759 (7.92%)
3. Biomass: 185 (1.93%)
4. Wind: 185 (1.93%)
5. Petroleum: 67 (0.70%)

This is a list of electricity-generating power stations in the U.S. state of Rhode Island, sorted by type and name. In 2024, Rhode Island had a total summer capacity of 2.3 GW through all of its power plants, and a net generation of 9,777 GWh. In 2025, the electrical energy generation mix was 87.5% natural gas, 7.9% solar, 1.9% biomass, 1.9% wind, and 0.7% petroleum. In May 2017, the first U.S. offshore wind farm began operating off Block Island.

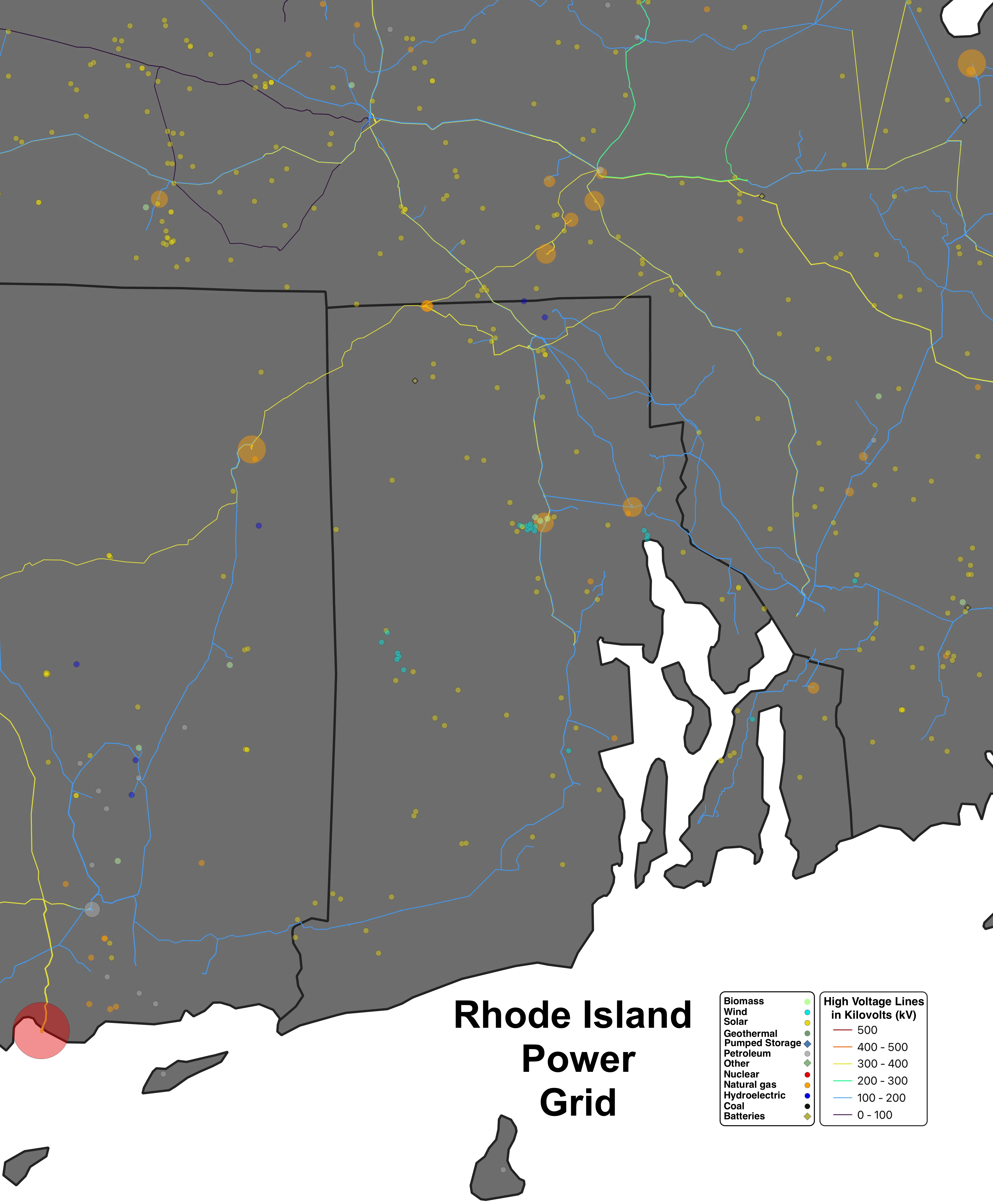
Rhode Island power grid

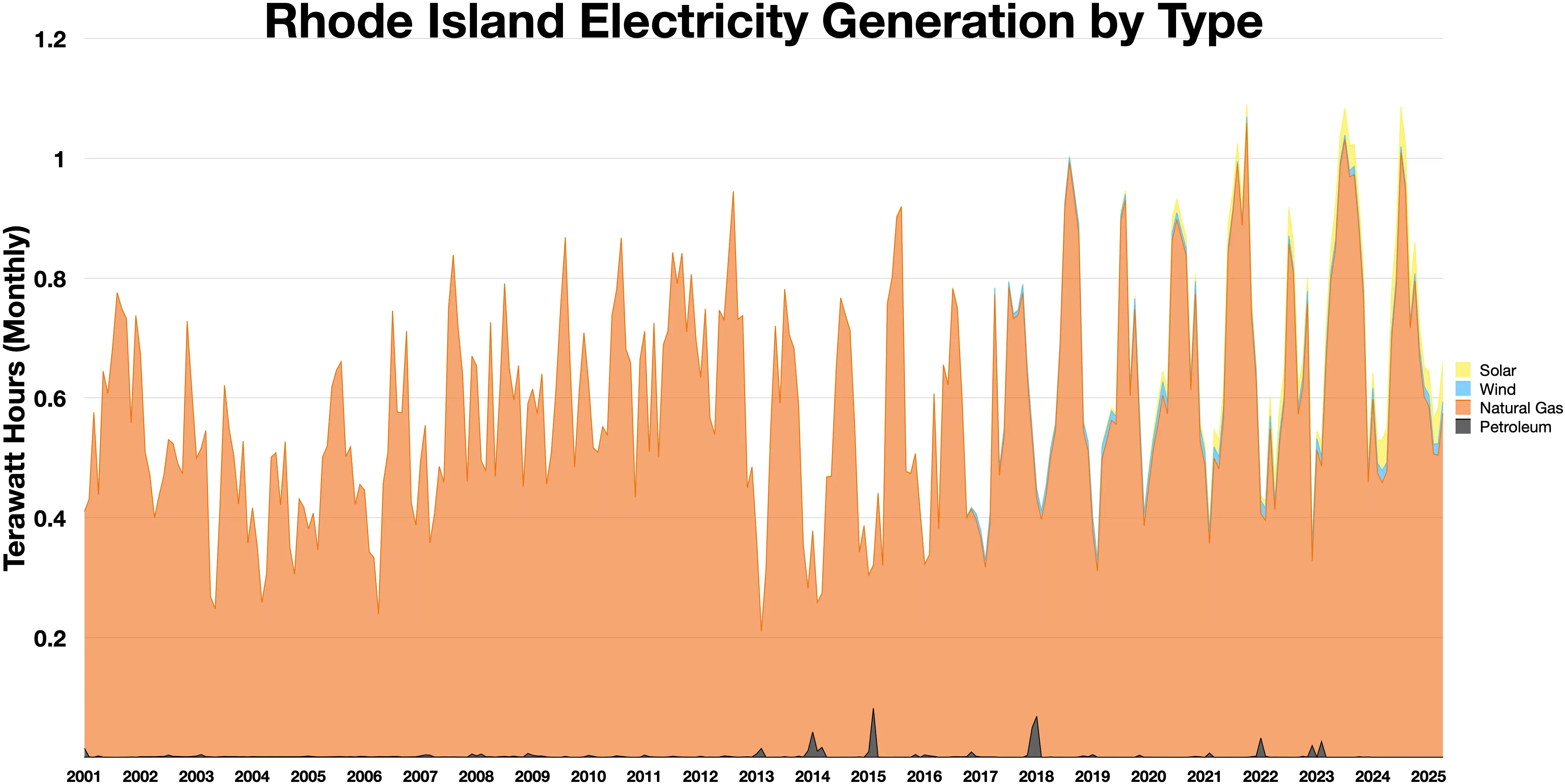
Rhode Island electricity generation by type

== Fossil fuel power plants ==
=== Natural gas ===
Data reported by U.S. Energy Information Administration
Name	Location	Coordinates	Capacity (MW)	Annual generation (GWh)	CO_{2} emissions (tons/year)	Technology	Year completed	Refs
Central Power Plant	Providence County	41°44′42″N 71°27′30″W	11	26 (2021)		Natural gas fired combustion turbine, natural gas internal combustion engine, natural gas steam turbine	1932	
Manchester Street	Providence County	41°48′56.6″N 71°24′15.4″W	515	1,345 (2024)	724,307 (2023)	Natural gas fired combined cycle	1903 (original units) 1996 (current units)	
Ocean State Power	Providence County	42°00′35.1″N 71°40′04.5″W	254.2	663 (2020)	273,418 (2020)	Natural gas fired combined cycle	1990	
Ocean State Power II	Providence County	42°00′37.8″N 71°40′12.0″W	254.2	633 (2020)	268,000 (2020)	Natural gas fired combined cycle	1991	
Pawtucket Power Associates (Note: Peaking plant; only operates when more power is needed than usual. About half of the plant's generating capacity will be retired in June 2022.)	Providence County	41°51′40.5″N 71°24′25.1″W	68.8	6 (2020)	2,697 (2020)	Natural gas fired combined cycle	1990	
Rhode Island Hospital	Providence County	41°48′37.0″N 71°24′35.2″W	10.4	23 (2020)	58,727 (2020)	Natural gas steam turbine	1974	
Rhode Island State Energy Center	Providence County	41°48′08″N 71°31′05.1″W	596	3,530 (2024)	1,370,137 (2023)	Natural gas fired combined cycle	2002	
Tiverton Power Plant	Newport County	41°38′31.8″N 71°10′14.1″W	272.5	1,590 (2020)	598,431 (2020)	Natural gas fired combined cycle	2000	
Toray Plastic America's CHP Plant	Washington County	41°35′37.9″N 71°25′38.9″W	20	142 (2020)	78,849 (2020)	Natural gas fired combustion turbine, natural gas internal combustion engine	2014	

=== Coal ===
There are no coal-fired power plants in Rhode Island.

=== Oil ===
There are no oil-fired power plants in Rhode Island.

== Renewable resources ==
=== Hydroelectric ===
Data reported by U.S. Energy Information Administration
Name	Location	Coordinates	Capacity (MW)	Annual generation (GWh)	Fuel type	Technology	Year completed	Refs
Blackstone/Tupperware	Providence County	42.014536°N 71.544381°W	1.6	4 (2021)	Hydro	Conventional hydroelectric	1980	

=== Wind ===
Data reported by U.S. Energy Information Administration
Name	Location	Coordinates	Capacity (MW)	Annual generation (GWh)	Fuel type	Year completed	Ref
Block Island Wind Farm	Block Island	41°06′52.96″N 71°31′16.18″W	30	94 (2024)	Offshore wind	2016-12	
NBC Field's Point Wind Farm	Providence County	41°47′38.5″N 71°23′24.7″W	4.5	7 (2021)	Onshore wind	2012	
WED Coventry 1	Kent County	41°40′31.7″N 71°42′27.7″W	1.5	3 (2019)	Onshore wind	2016-10	
WED Coventry 2	Kent County	41°40′20.8″N 71°42′20.8″W	4.5	10 (2019)	Onshore wind	2016-08	
WED Coventry 3	Kent County	41°41′43.8″N 71°43′15.7″W	1.5	3 (2019)	Onshore wind	2016-08	
WED Coventry 4	Kent County	41°41′11.7″N 71°43′46.0″W	1.5	3 (2019)	Onshore wind	2016-08	
WED Coventry 5	Kent County	41°39′35.8″N 71°41′59.5″W	1.5	3 (2019)	Onshore wind	2017	
WED Coventry 6	Kent County	41°40′11.6″N 71°42′29.6″W	4.5	9 (2019)	Onshore wind	2016-08	
WED Green Hill	Providence County	41°47′52.3″N 71°31′47.2″W	3	7 (2019)	Onshore wind	2018	
WED NK Green	Washington County	41°34′53.8″N 71°29′12.3″W	1.5	3 (2019)	Onshore wind	2012	
WED Plainfield	Providence County	41°47′46.0″N 71°32′08.9″W	3	6 (2019)	Onshore wind	2018	
WED Plainfield II	Providence County	41°47′40.5″N 71°32′23.8″W	3	6 (2019)	Onshore wind	2018	
WED Plainfield III	Providence County	41°47′36.8″N 71°31′50.3″W	3	5 (2019)	Onshore wind	2018	
WED Portsmouth One	Newport County	41°36′51.1″N 71°15′04.6″W	1.5	5 (2019)	Onshore wind	2016	
WED Shun I	Providence County	41°47′54.4″N 71°32′26.5″W	3	7 (2019)	Onshore wind	2018	
WED Shun II	Providence County	41°48′00.5″N 71°32′10.4″W	3	6 (2019)	Onshore wind	2018	
WED Shun III	Providence County	41°47′56.7″N 71°32′57.6″W	3	5 (2019)	Onshore wind	2018	

==== Small-scale wind (<1MW) ====
Data reported by U.S. Energy Information Administration
Name	Location	Coordinates	Capacity (KW)	# of turbines	Year operational	Refs
Hodges Badge	Newport County	41°33′59.119″N 71°15′17.798″W	250	1	2012	
New England Tech	Kent County	41°43′58.051″N 71°27′5.399″W	100	1	2009	
Portsmouth Abbey School	Newport County	41°35′56.728″N 71°16′7.319″W	660	1	2006	
Sandywoods	Newport County	41°37′13.768″N 71°9′14.039″W	275	1	2012	

=== Solar ===
Data reported by U.S. Energy Information Administration
Plant	Location	Coordinates	Area	Capacity (MW)	Annual generation (GWh)	Technology	Year completed	Refs
A Street 1	Providence County			1.2	2 (2020)	Photovoltaic solar		
A Street 2	Providence County			1.6	3 (2020)	Photovoltaic solar		
Alton Road Solar	Washington County			13.9	24 (2020)	Photovoltaic solar		
Blackhorse Farm	Bristol County			3.8	0 (2020)	Photovoltaic solar		
Brookside	Providence County	41°59′10.5″N 71°35′05.9″W		1	2 (2020)	Photovoltaic solar	2016-09	
CED Foster	Providence County	41°47′44.7″N 71°47′13.6″W		2	3 (2021)	Photovoltaic solar	2017	
Forbes Street Solar	Providence County	41°46′21.1″N 71°20′17.8″W		3	3 (2020)	Photovoltaic solar	2013	
Founders Homestead Farms	Newport County	41°34′37.6″N 71°16′46.5″W		4.5	7 (2021)	Photovoltaic solar		
GD Glocester White Oak I	Providence County			1.8	0 (2020)	Photovoltaic solar		
GD Hopkinton Main I	Washington County			10.6	0.2 (2020)	Photovoltaic solar		
GD Richmond Buttonwoods I	Washington County	41°31′27.1″N 71°41′02.9″W		1.3	2 (2020)	Photovoltaic solar	2020	
GD West Greenwich Victory I	Kent County			1.8	3 (2020)	Photovoltaic solar		
Gold Meadows	Kent County			16.2	29 (2020)	Photovoltaic solar		
Hope Farm Solar	Providence County	41°44′55.7″N 71°31′18.2″W		10	17 (2020)	Photovoltaic solar	2018	
Hopkins Hill CSG	Kent County			4.8	0.5 (2020)	Photovoltaic solar		
Hopkinton Phase 2	Washington County			2.5	1 (2020)	Photovoltaic solar		
ISM Solar Cranston CSG	Providence County			3.1	0 (2020)	Photovoltaic solar		
Johnston Solar	Providence County	41°48′05.3″N 71°33′30.7″W		1	2 (2020)	Photovoltaic solar	2014	
Kearsarge East Providence	Providence County			2		Photovoltaic solar		
Kearsarge Fogland	Newport County			2.3		Photovoltaic solar		
Kearsarge SKSC1	Washington County	41°28′16.4″N 71°29′40.4″W		3.8	7 (2020)	Photovoltaic solar	2018	
Kearsarge SKSC2	Washington County	41°29′53.5″N 71°32′00.4″W		3.1	6 (2020)	Photovoltaic solar	2018	
Kearsarge Westerly	Washington County			4		Photovoltaic solar		
Kilvert	Kent County			4.7	9 (2020)	Photovoltaic solar		
Little Bay	Providence County	41°47′57.7″N 71°26′11.0″W		1.3	2 (2020)	Photovoltaic solar	2015	
Nautilus Goat Island Solar CSG	Providence County	41°56′30.7″N 71°39′40.6″W		3.3	4 (2020)	Photovoltaic solar	2019	
North Providence	Providence County			2	4 (2020)	Photovoltaic solar		
North Smithfield Solar Power 1	Providence County	41°58′34.1″N 71°35′11.7″W		2	1 (2020)	Photovoltaic solar	2017	
Pine Hill	Providence County			5	2 (2020)	Photovoltaic solar		
Plainfield Pike	Providence County			2	4 (2020)	Photovoltaic solar		
Richmond NMCA	Washington County	41°26′31.1″N 71°42′47.9″W		4	6 (2021)	Photovoltaic solar	2018	
Robin Hallow	Kent County	41.6402°N 71.6295°W		40.7	69 (2024)	Photovoltaic solar	2023	
Smithfield Solar Farm	Providence County			2.4	1 (2020)	Photovoltaic solar		
Town of Burrillville Solar CSG	Providence County			3.3	1 (2020)	Photovoltaic solar		
TPE Hopkins Solar Holdings 1	Kent County			4.8	0.5 (2020)	Photovoltaic solar		
University Solar	Kent County	41°36′50.6″N 71°39′31.8″W		50	26 (2024)	Photovoltaic solar	2019	
WED GW Solar, LLC	Providence County	41°56′14.7″N 71°29′15.2″W		3	4 (2019)	Photovoltaic solar	2018	
WED Kingstown Solar I - East	Washington County	41°29′33.1″N 71°37′07.0″W		3	5 (2019)	Photovoltaic solar	2018	
WED Kingstown Solar I - West	Washington County	41°29′31.5″N 71°37′25.9″W		1.5	2 (2019)	Photovoltaic solar	2018	
WED Stilson Solar	Washington County	41°31′08.2″N 71°41′11.4″W		2	3 (2019)	Photovoltaic solar	2017	
West Davisville Solar	Washington County	41°36′13.1″N 71°28′38.2″W		2	3 (2019)	Photovoltaic solar	2013	
West Greenwich Solar	Kent County	41°39′07.0″N 71°42′39.2″W		1.9	3 (2020)	Photovoltaic solar	2013	

=== Biomass ===
Data reported by U.S. Energy Information Administration
Name	Location	Coordinates	Capacity (MW)	Annual generation (GWh)	Technology	Year completed	Refs
Johnston LFG Turbine Plant	Providence County	41°53′17.16″N 71°28′39″W	35.7	195 (2024)	Landfill gas	2013	
Orbit Energy RI	Providence County	41°48′21.2″N 71°30′53.7″W	3.2	-3 (2020)	Anaerobic digester	2018 (Note: Originally opened in August 2017 but closed shortly after due to mechanical issues.)	
Ridgewood Providence Power	Providence County	41°53′17.16″N 71°28′39″W	6.4	0 (2020)	Landfill gas	1990	

== Nuclear ==
There are no nuclear power plants in Rhode Island.

== Power stations under construction or planned ==
Name	Location	Coordinates	Capacity (MW)	Fuel type	Technology	Status	Year	Refs
North Smithfield Solar Project	Providence County	41°57′51.8″N 71°31′06.0″W	38.4	Solar	Photovoltaic solar	Under construction	October 2021	
Revolution Wind	Atlantic Ocean, off Rhode Island	41°11′00.5″N 71°10′05.7″W	704 (400 to RI) (304 to CT)	Wind	Offshore Wind	Planned	Construction to start in 2023	

== See also ==
- List of power stations in the United States
- List of wind farms in the United States
