= Lists of power stations in the United States =

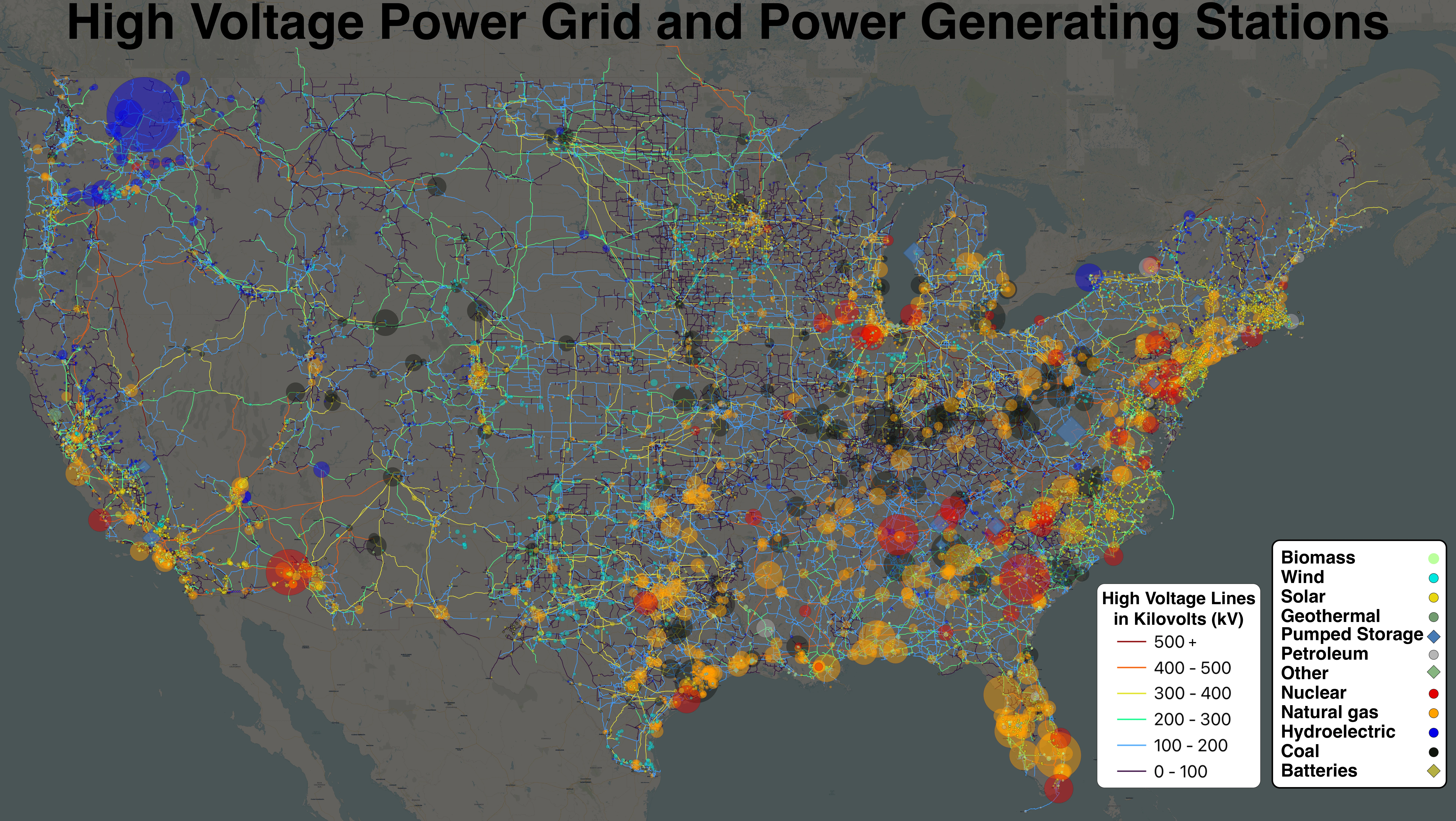
Electrical grid and power plants in the US

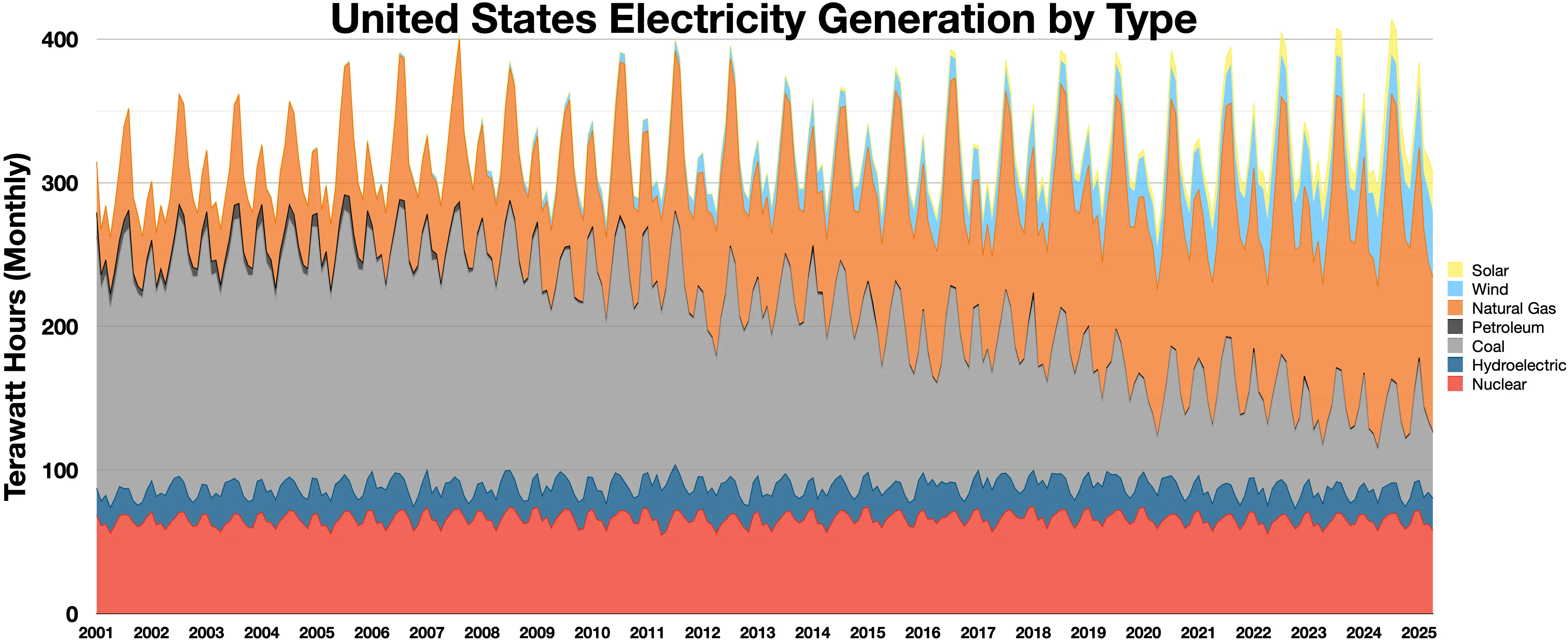
United States electricity production by type

The United States is home to a wide variety of power stations. The list below outlines power stations of significance by type, or by the state in which they reside.

== By type ==
The following pages lists the power stations in the United States by type:

- List of largest power stations in the United States

Non-renewable energy

- Coal-fired power stations
- Natural gas-fired power stations
- Nuclear power stations

Renewable energy

- Geothermal power stations
- Hydroelectric power stations
- Solar power stations
- Wind farms (onshore)
- Wind farms (offshore)

== By state or district ==
The following pages lists the power stations in the United States by state or federal district:

- List of power stations in Alabama
- List of power stations in Alaska
- List of power stations in Arizona
- List of power stations in Arkansas
- List of power stations in California
- List of power stations in Colorado
- List of power stations in Connecticut
- List of power stations in Delaware
- List of power stations in Florida
- List of power stations in Georgia
- List of power stations in Hawaii
- List of power stations in Idaho
- List of power stations in Illinois
- List of power stations in Indiana
- List of power stations in Iowa
- List of power stations in Kansas
- List of power stations in Kentucky
- List of power stations in Louisiana
- List of power stations in Maine
- List of power stations in Maryland
- List of power stations in Massachusetts
- List of power stations in Michigan
- List of power stations in Minnesota
- List of power stations in Mississippi
- List of power stations in Missouri
- List of power stations in Montana
- List of power stations in Nebraska
- List of power stations in Nevada
- List of power stations in New Hampshire
- List of power stations in New Jersey
- List of power stations in New Mexico
- List of power stations in New York
- List of power stations in North Carolina
- List of power stations in North Dakota
- List of power stations in Ohio
- List of power stations in Oklahoma
- List of power stations in Oregon
- List of power stations in Pennsylvania
- List of power stations in Rhode Island
- List of power stations in South Carolina
- List of power stations in South Dakota
- List of power stations in Tennessee
- List of power stations in Texas
- List of power stations in Utah
- List of power stations in Vermont
- List of power stations in Virginia
- List of power stations in Washington
- List of power stations in Washington, D.C.
- List of power stations in West Virginia
- List of power stations in Wisconsin
- List of power stations in Wyoming

== See also ==
- List of largest power stations in the world
- List of power stations in Canada
- List of power stations in Mexico
- List of infrastructure in the United States
