= Infrastructure policy of the United States =

The infrastructure policy of the United States is the set of objectives and programs of the federal government to build, maintain, and regulate hard infrastructure in the United States. Infrastructure policy is overseen and carried out by several departments and agencies.

== Policy development ==
The Constitution grants Congress the power to support interstate commerce or national defense through legislation. This has been interpreted to include the construction of infrastructure projects that serve to connect the states. The Commerce Clause of the Constitution also grants Congress the power to regulate interstate commerce, and the Supreme Court affirmed this power in the 1824 case Gibbons v. Ogden. The Constitution also grants Congress authority over the local affairs of Washington, D.C., including infrastructure. Implementation and regulation of infrastructure policy has been delegated to executive departments and agencies, including the Department of Transportation, the Department of Energy, the Environmental Protection Agency, and the Federal Communications Commission.

== History ==
Early infrastructure policy of the United States focused on internal improvements, a series of public works projects that constructed roads, canals, and other facilities to support interstate transportation. Internal improvements were supported by the Federalist Party, but improvements in the 1790s and 1800s were limited primarily to the construction of lighthouses. The first major federal infrastructure project, and the largest prior to the Civil War, was the Cumberland Road that connected Cumberland, Maryland and Vandalia, Illinois.

Federal authority over internal improvements was often challenged, with Presidents James Madison and James Monroe using the presidential veto to restrict internal improvements bills, arguing that they were unconstitutional. Monroe took the position that a federal system of improvements was unconstitutional but that appropriations for improvements were permissible, setting the precedent for future improvements projects. In the 1820s, infrastructure projects were promoted as a component of the American System by Henry Clay. Infrastructure spending fell dramatically after the Panic of 1837, and the next major period of infrastructure spending would not take place until 1851. By 1860, $119.8 million had been spent on internal improvements, with $77.2 million of this distributed to the states.

== Energy policy ==
The Department of Energy is responsible for overseeing federal energy policy.

== Telecommunications policy ==
American telecommunications policy is governed by the Communications Act of 1934 and the Telecommunications Act of 1996. The Federal Communications Commission is responsible for regulating telecommunications in the United States.

== Transportation policy ==
The Department of Transportation is responsible for developing and carrying out American transportation policy. The administrations of the department are empowered to regulate travel by sea, air, rail, and federal highways. Early transportation policy consisted of admiralty law set out by federal courts. Congress began development of a codified federal transportation policy with the enactment of several Pacific Railroad Acts in the 1860s to support westward expansion. The Office of Public Roads, predecessor to the Federal Highway Administration, was created in 1905. The National Advisory Committee for Aeronautics, which would later become NASA was formed in 1915 following the advent of powered air flight.

== Waste policy ==
Waste policy in the United States is governed by the Resource Conservation and Recovery Act. The Environmental Protection Agency is responsible for overseeing waste policy.

== Water management policy ==
Water management policy includes the regulation of water supplies, water sanitation, and public water systems. Water and sewage systems are typically operated or regulated by local and state governments, but they must also comply with federal regulations. American water management policy is governed by the Clean Water Act and the Safe Drinking Water Act. The Environmental Protection Agency is responsible for overseeing federal water sanitation regulations.

The United States Public Health Service established the first federal drinking water standards in 1914 to regulate drinking water on interstate carriers. The Civil Works Administration and the Works Progress Administration expanded federal involvement in water management in the 1930s, hiring workers to construct sewer projects and sewage treatment plants. Federal sanitation regulations were expanded over the following decades, and the federal government spent $4 billion on sewer systems by 1977.

== See also ==
- Infrastructure policy of Donald Trump
- Build Back Better Plan
- List of infrastructure in the United States
