= List of power stations in Delaware =

Sources of Delaware utility-scale electricity generation in gigawatt-hours, full-year 2025:
1. Natural gas: 4,556 (85.3%)
2. Coal: 253 (4.74%)
3. Other gases: 207 (3.87%)
4. Solar: 180 (3.37%)
5. Petroleum: 103 (1.93%)
6. Biomass: 38 (0.71%)
7. Wind: 5 (0.09%)

This is a list of electricity-generating power stations in the U.S. state of Delaware, sorted by type and name. In 2024, Delaware had a total summer capacity of 3.3 GW through all of its power plants, and a net generation of 4,799 GWh. In 2025, the electrical energy generation mix was 85.3% natural gas, 4.7% coal, 3.9% other gases, 3.4% solar, 1.9% petroleum, 0.7% biomass, and less than 0.1% wind. Distributed small-scale solar, including customer-owned photovoltaic panels, delivered an additional net 225 GWh to the state's electricity grid in 2024. This is about 25 percent more than the amount generated by Delaware's utility-scale solar facilities.

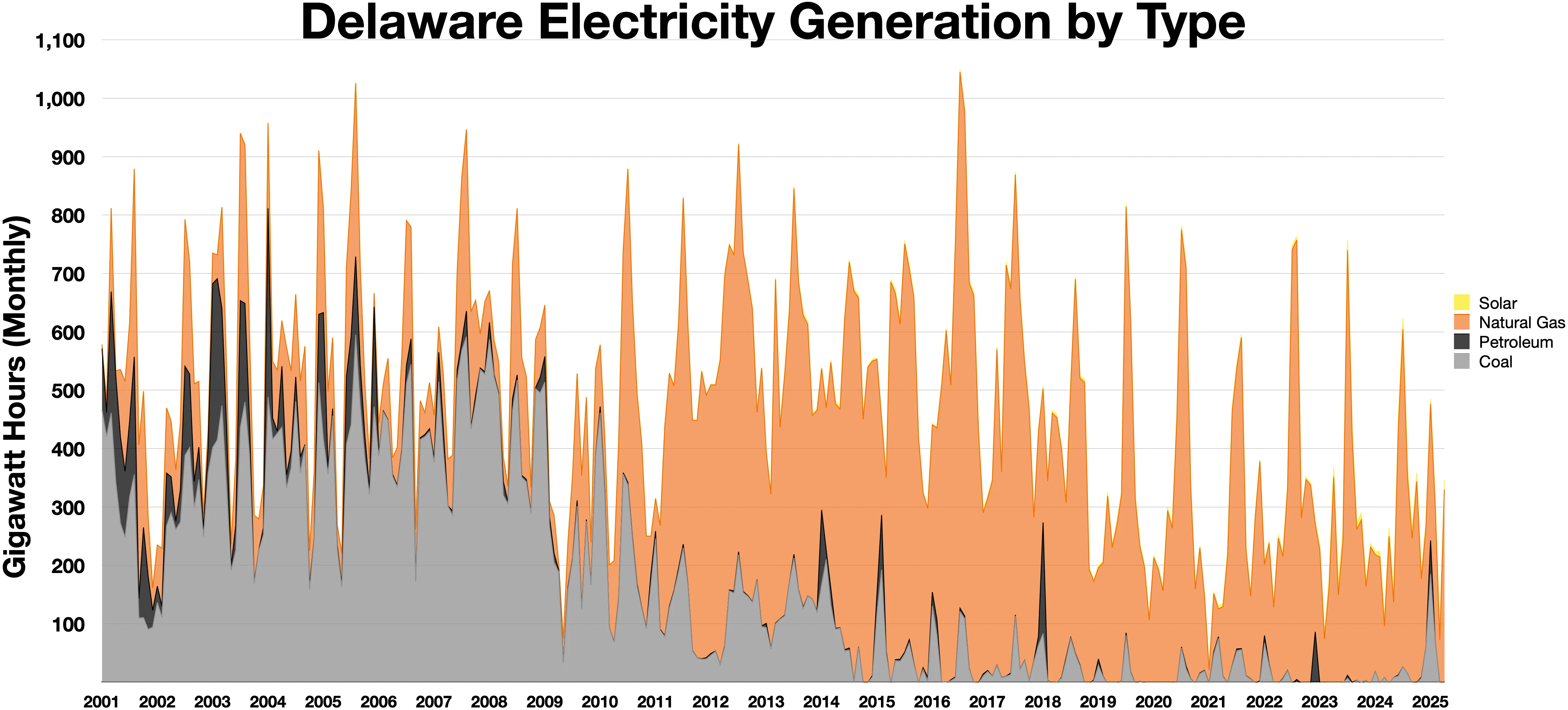
Delaware electricity generation by type

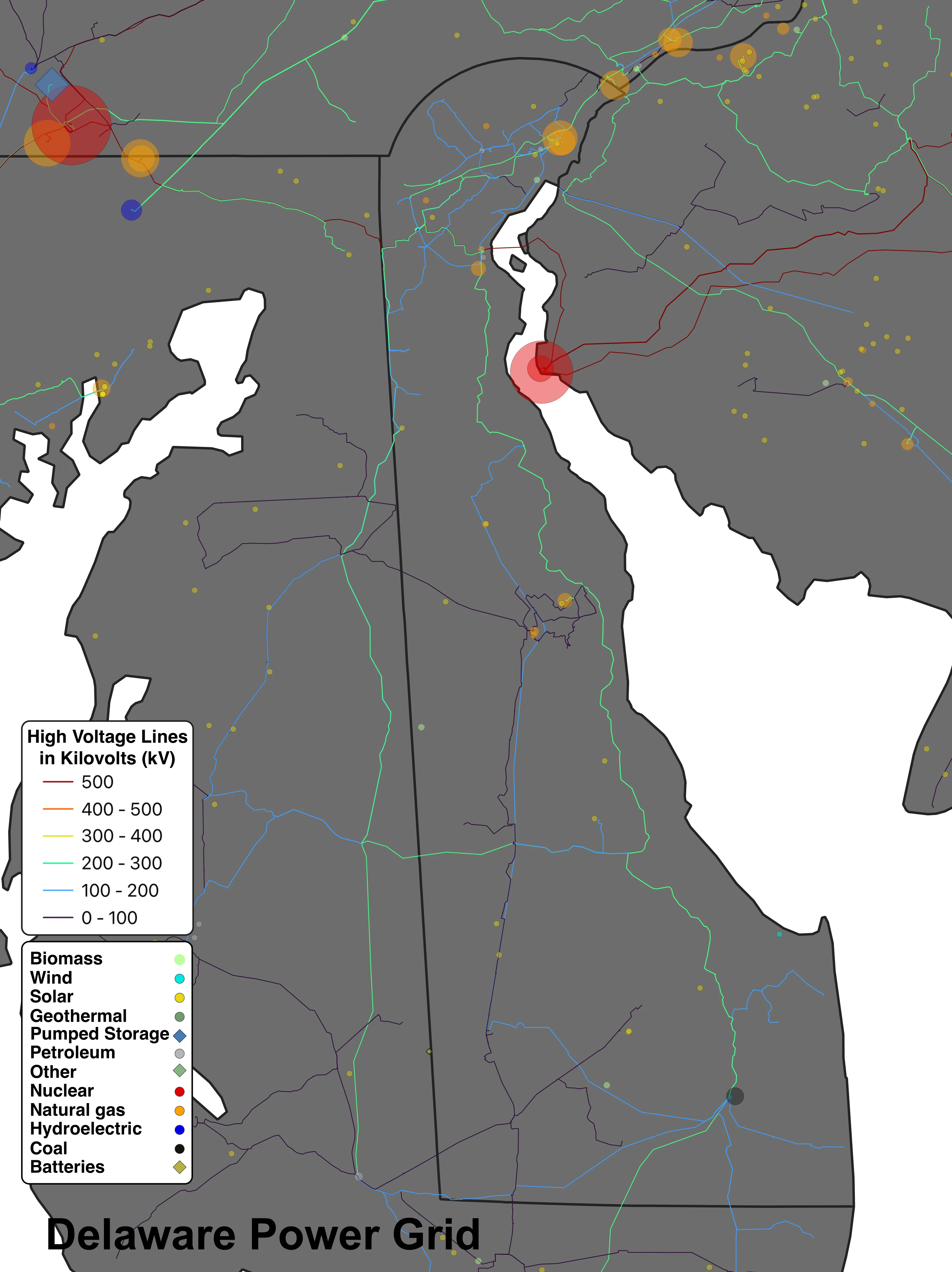
Delaware power grid

== Fossil-fuel power stations ==
Data from the U.S. Energy Information Administration serves as a general reference.

=== Petroleum ===
Plant name	Location	Coordinates	Capacity (MW)^{[A]}	Generation type	Year opened	Refs
Christiana	New Castle County	39°43′49″N 75°32′14″W	52.0	Simple cycle (x2)	1973	
Delaware City 10	New Castle County	39°36′01″N 75°37′36″W	18.5	Simple cycle	1968	
Edge Moor	New Castle County	39°44′20″N 75°30′14″W	15.0	Simple cycle	1963	
Indian River Generating Station	Sussex County	38°35′09″N 75°14′03″W	16.1	Simple cycle	1967	
Van Sant Station	Kent County	39°08′42″N 75°32′54″W	45.1	Simple cycle	1991	
West Station (DE)	New Castle County	39°43′42″N 75°37′44″W	20.0	Simple cycle	1964	

^{A} Total net summer capacity

=== Natural gas ===
Plant name	Location	Coordinates	Capacity (MW)^{[A]}	Generation type	Year opened	Refs
AGT001 Centerville Fuel Cell	New Castle County	39°45′28″N 75°37′20″W	1.3	Fuel cell	2019	
Brookside Newark	New Castle County	39°40′08″N 75°42′58″W	3.1	Fuel cell	2012	
Delaware City Plant	New Castle County	39°35′14″N 75°38′03″W	265.0^{[B]}	Steam turbine (x4), simple cycle (x2)	1956/1961/1982; 2000	
Edge Moor	New Castle County	39°44′20″N 75°30′14″W	710.0	Steam turbine (x3)	1954/1966/1973	
Energy Center Dover	Kent County	39°08′58″N 75°32′50″W	118.0	1x1 combined cycle, simple cycle	1985/2001; 2001	
Garrison Energy Center	Kent County	39°11′14″N 75°29′58″W	361.0	1x1 combined cycle	2015	
Hay Road	New Castle County	39°44′37″N 75°30′26″W	1,193.0	3x1 combined cycle (x2)	1989/1991/ 1993/2001	
NAES McKee Run	Kent County	39°10′34″N 75°32′48″W	113.6	Steam turbine	1975	
Red Lion Energy Center	New Castle County	39°36′36″N 75°37′47″W	27.0	Fuel cell (x6)	2013	
Warren F Sam Beasley Generation Station	Kent County	39°16′45″N 75°37′26″W	98.0	Simple cycle (x2)	2002/2012	

^{A} Total net summer capacity
^{B} Half of generating capacity at the Delaware City Oil Refinery is allocated to other petroleum gases.

== Renewable power stations ==
Data from the U.S. Energy Information Administration serves as a general reference.

=== Biomass ===
Plant name	Location	Coordinates	Capacity (MW)^{[A]}	Fuel	Generation type	Year opened	Refs
Ameresco Delaware Central	Kent County	39°02′02″N 75°43′24″W	5.0	Landfill gas	Reciprocating engine (x5)	2006	
Ameresco Delaware South	Kent County	38°35′57″N 75°26′03″W	5.0	Landfill gas	Reciprocating engine (x5)	2006	
Croda Atlas Point CHP	New Castle County	39°41′36″N 75°32′35″W	2.2	Landfill gas	Reciprocating engine (x2)	2013	

^{A} Total net summer capacity

=== Geothermal ===
There were no utility-scale Geothermal facilities in the state of Delaware in 2019.

=== Hydroelectric ===
There were no utility-scale Hydroelectric facilities in the state of Delaware in 2019.

=== Solar photovoltaic ===
Plant name	Location	Coordinates	Capacity (MW_{AC})	Year opened	Refs
Bruce A Henry Solar Farm	Sussex County	38°39′50″N 75°24′02″W	4.0	2013	
DD Hay Road Solar 23 LLC	New Castle County	39°44′12″N 75°36′42″W	1.2	2010	
DG AMP Solar Smyrna	Kent County	39°16′47″N 75°37′21″W	1.2	2018	
Dover Sun Park	Kent County	39°11′01″N 75°36′16″W	10.0	2011	
Kent County Wastewater Treatment Solar	Kent County	38°59′35″N 75°26′15″W	1.2	2011	
Milford Solar Farm	Kent County	38°55′23″N 75°27′12″W	11.8	2013	
Onyx - Allen Harim	Sussex County	38°43′03″N 75°17′20″W	1.2	2017	
Perdue Bridgeville Photovoltaic	Sussex County	38°45′28″N 75°36′07″W	1.3	2011	
South Campus Solar	New Castle County	39°46′53″N 75°32′54″W	0.5	2011	
WHA Southbridge Solar Park CSG	New Castle County	39°43′25″N 75°32′46″W	1.4	2018	

=== Wind ===
Plant name	Location	Coordinates	Capacity (MW)	Year opened	Refs
University of Delaware Wind Turbine	Sussex County	38°46′58″N 75°09′54″W	2.0	2010	

== Nuclear power stations ==
There are no utility-scale nuclear facilities in the state of Delaware.

== Storage power stations ==
=== Battery storage ===
There are no utility-scale battery storage facilities in the state of Delaware.

=== Pumped storage ===
There are no utility-scale pumped storage facilities in the state of Delaware.

== Closed plants ==
=== Coal ===
Plant name	Location	Coordinates	Capacity (MW)^{[A]}	Generation type	Year opened	Year retired	Refs
Indian River Generating Station	Sussex County	38°35′09″N 75°14′03″W	410.0	Steam turbine	1980	2025	

^{A} Total net summer capacity

== See also ==
- List of power stations in the United States
