= List of power stations in Louisiana =

Sources of Louisiana utility-scale electricity generation in gigawatt-hours, full-year 2025:
1. Natural gas: 48,361 (66.1%)
2. Nuclear: 15,255 (20.9%)
3. Coal: 5,531 (7.56%)
4. Solar: 2,409 (3.29%)
5. Hydroelectric: 837 (1.14%)
6. Petroleum: 450 (0.62%)
7. Biomass: 81 (0.11%)
8. Other: 211 (0.29%)

This is a list of electricity-generating power stations in the U.S. state of Louisiana, sorted by type and name. In 2024, Louisiana had a total summer capacity of 24.7 GW across all of its power plants and a net generation of 99,622 GWh. In 2025, Louisiana’s energy mix was 66.1% natural gas, 20.9% nuclear, 7.6% coal, 3.3% solar, 1.1% hydroelectric, 0.6% petroleum, 0.1% biomass, and 0.3% other.

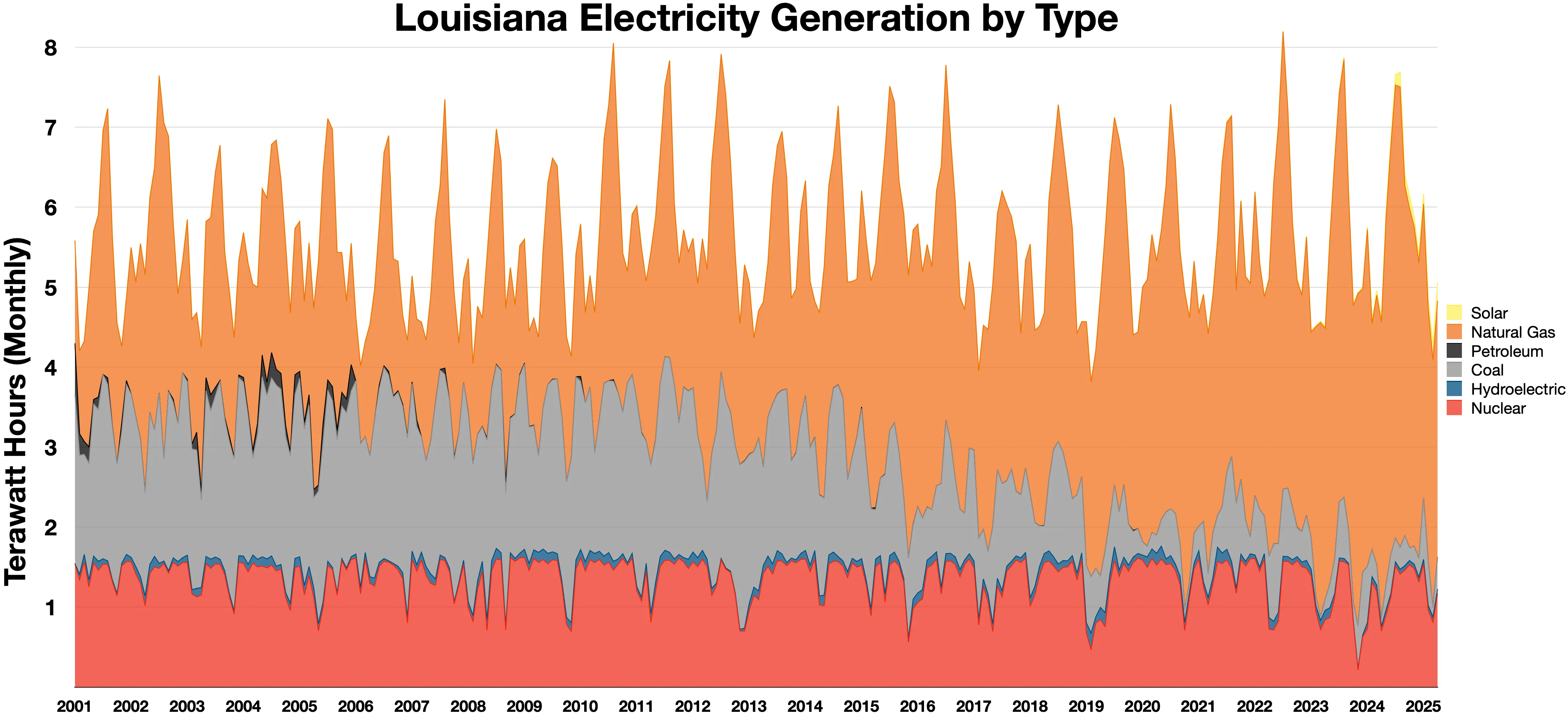
Louisiana electricity generation by type

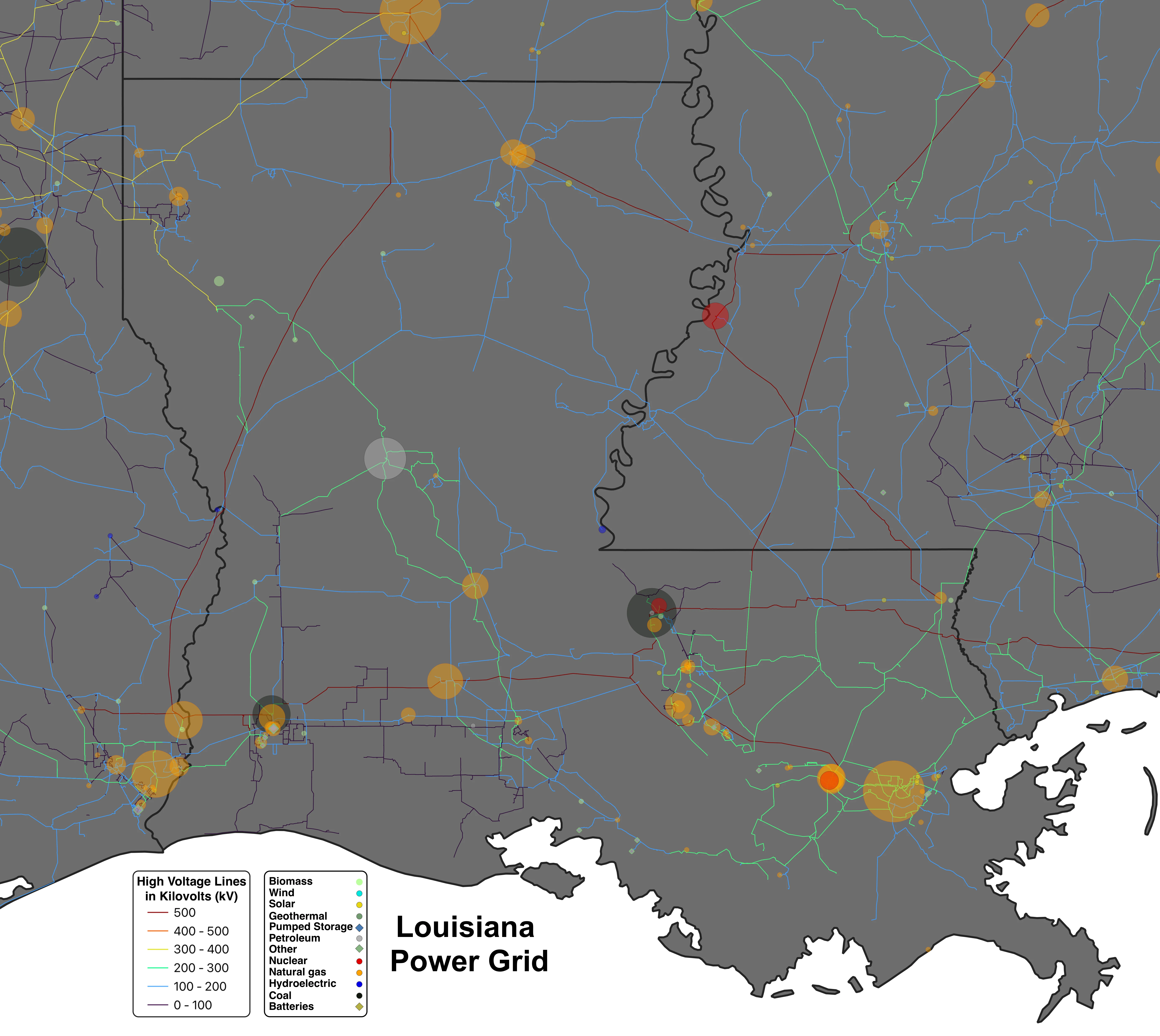
Louisiana power grid

== Nuclear power plants ==
Name	Location	Coordinates	Capacity (MW)	Operator	Year opened
River Bend Nuclear Generating Station	St. Francisville	30°45′19″N 91°20′00″W	974	Entergy Louisiana	1986
Waterford Nuclear Generating Station	Killona	29°59′43″N 90°28′19″W	1,152	Entergy Louisiana	1985

== Fossil-fuel power plants ==
=== Coal ===
Name	Location	Coordinates	Capacity (MW)	Operator	Year opened
Big Cajun II	New Roads	30°43′36″N 91°22′01″W	1,277	Cleco and Entergy	1981
R. S. Nelson	Westlake	30°17′04″N 93°17′28″W	615	Entergy	1982

=== Natural gas ===
Name	Location	Capacity (MW)	Operator	Year opened
Acadia Power Station	Eunice	1,064	Cleco and Entergy	2002
Bayou Cove Peaking Plant	Jefferson Davis Parish, Louisiana	175	Entergy	2002
Perryville Power Station	Sterlington, Louisiana	638	Entergy	2002
Nine Mile Point Station	Westwego	1,575	Entergy	1971, 1973, 2014
J. Wayne Leonard Power Station	Montz, Louisiana	980	Entergy	2019
New Orleans Power Station	New Orleans	128	Entergy	2020

=== Petroleum ===
Name	Location	Capacity (MW)	Operator	Year opened	Notes
Harvey Station	Harvey, Louisiana	72	Entergy	1964	
Louisiana 1	Baton Rouge, Louisiana	428	Entergy	1951	75% natural gas and 25% petroleum

== Renewable power plants ==
=== Biomass ===
Name	Location	Coordinates	Capacity (MW)	Fuel type	Operator	Year opened
Drax Morehouse BioEnergy	Bastrop, Louisiana	32°57′27″N 91°52′02″W	65	Wood pellets	Drax Group	2015
Alexandria Biomass	Alexandria, Louisiana	31°52′37″N 92°16′49″W	23	Wood/wood waste	Procter & Gamble	2014

=== Solar ===
Name	Location	Coordinates	Capacity (MW)	Year opened
Iris Solar Facility	Washington Parish, Louisiana	30°53′46″N 90°04′24″W	80	2020
Bayou Galion Solar Project	Morehouse Parish, Louisiana	32°48′19″N 91°49′50″W	98	2023

=== Hydroelectric ===
Name	Location	Coordinates	Capacity (MW)	Year opened
Sidney A. Murray Jr. Hydroelectric Station	Concordia Parish, Louisiana	31°05′16″N 91°37′11″W	192	1990

== Decommissioned power plants ==
- Dolet Hills Power Station (coal) - 2021
- Market Street Power Plant (coal) - 1973

== See also ==
- List of power stations in the United States
- List of power stations operated by the Tennessee Valley Authority
