= List of infrastructure in the United States =

Lists of infrastructure in the United States by category.

== Electricity infrastructure ==
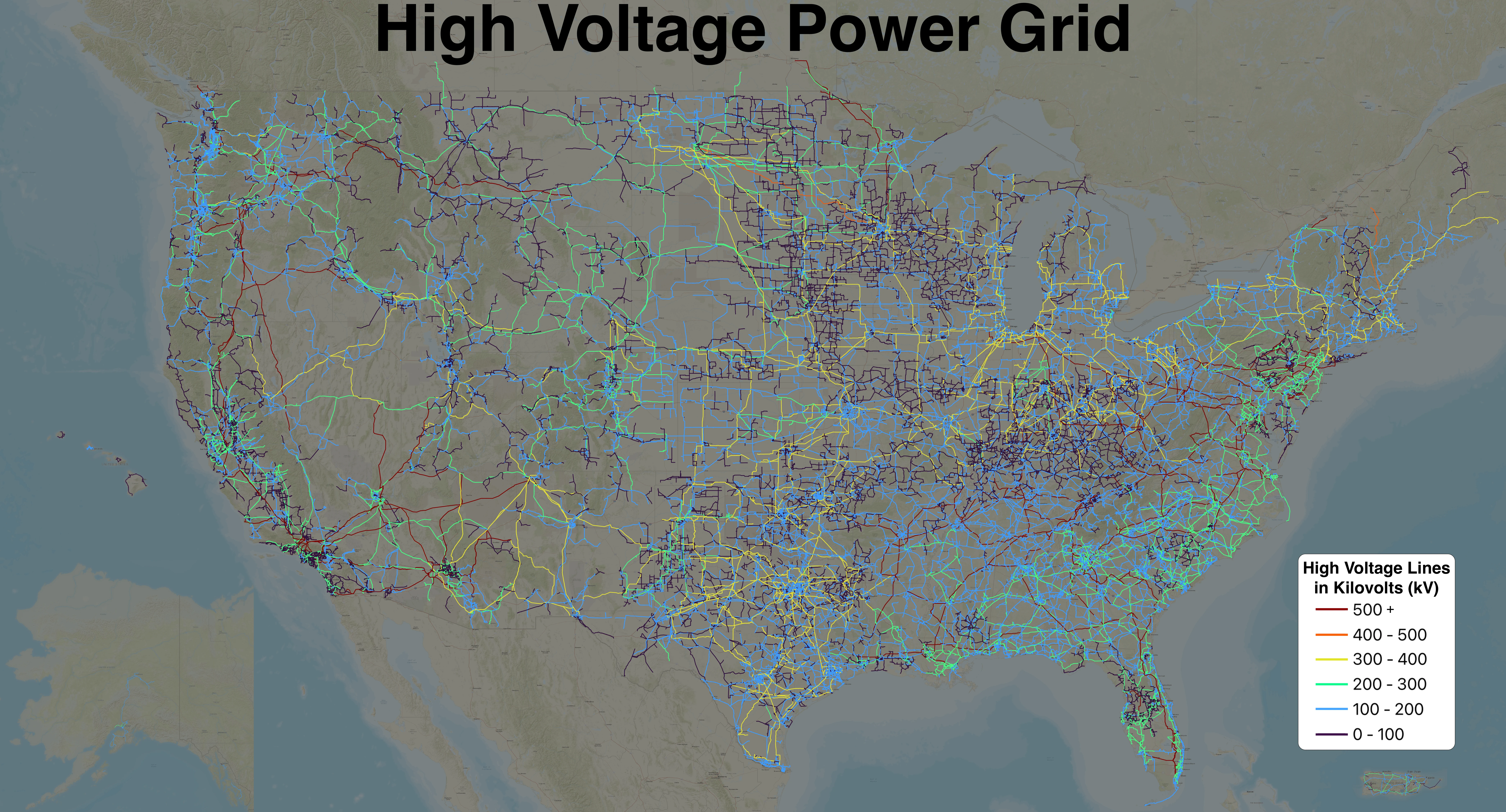
High voltage power grid

Substations on the United States grid

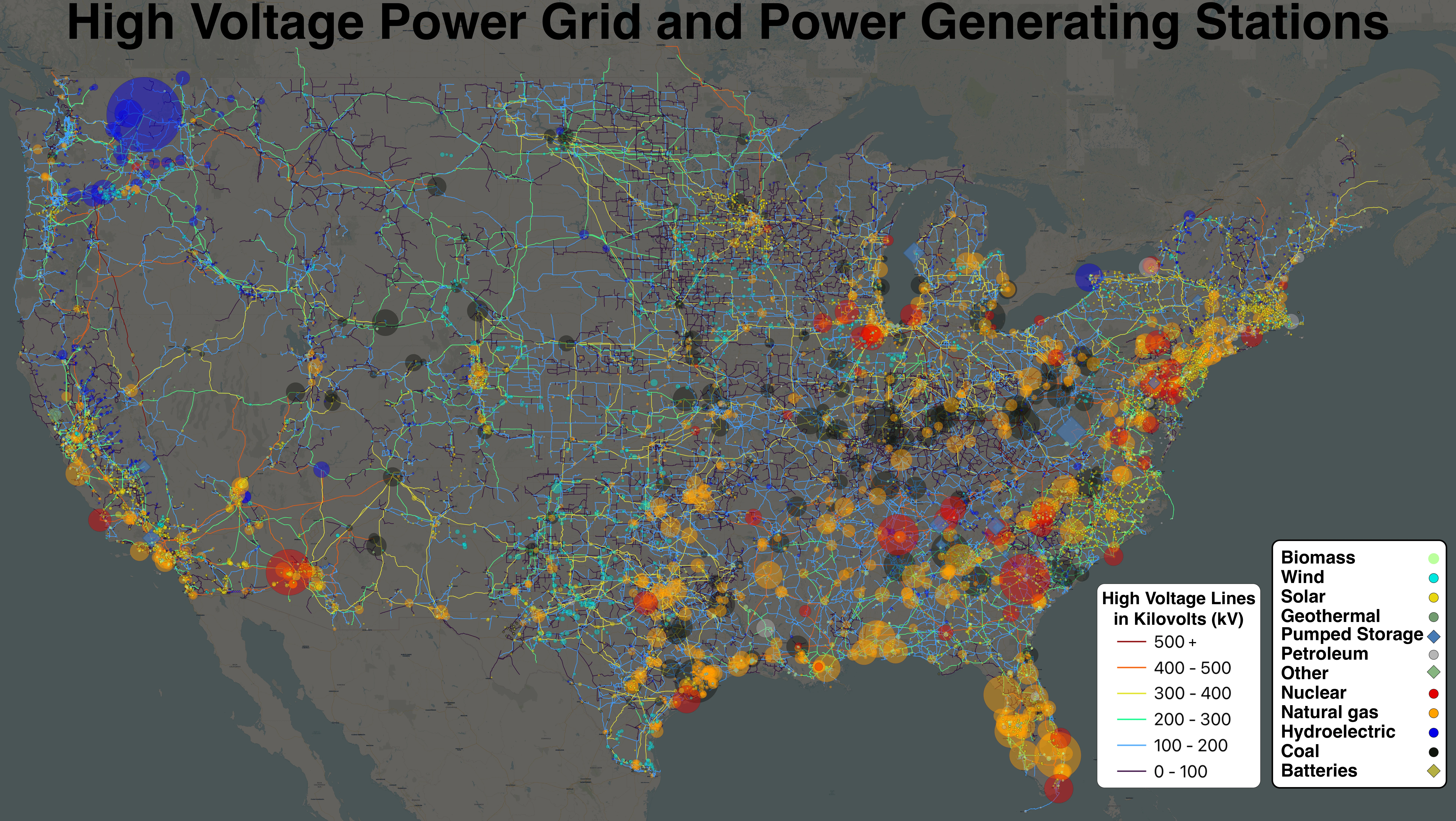
Power stations in the United States and the high voltage grid

- List of natural gas power stations in the United States
- List of coal-fired power stations in the United States
- Nuclear power plants in the United States
- List of hydroelectric power stations in the United States
- List of geothermal power stations in the United States
- List of wind farms in the United States
- Large-scale photovoltaic facilities in the United States

== Roads ==
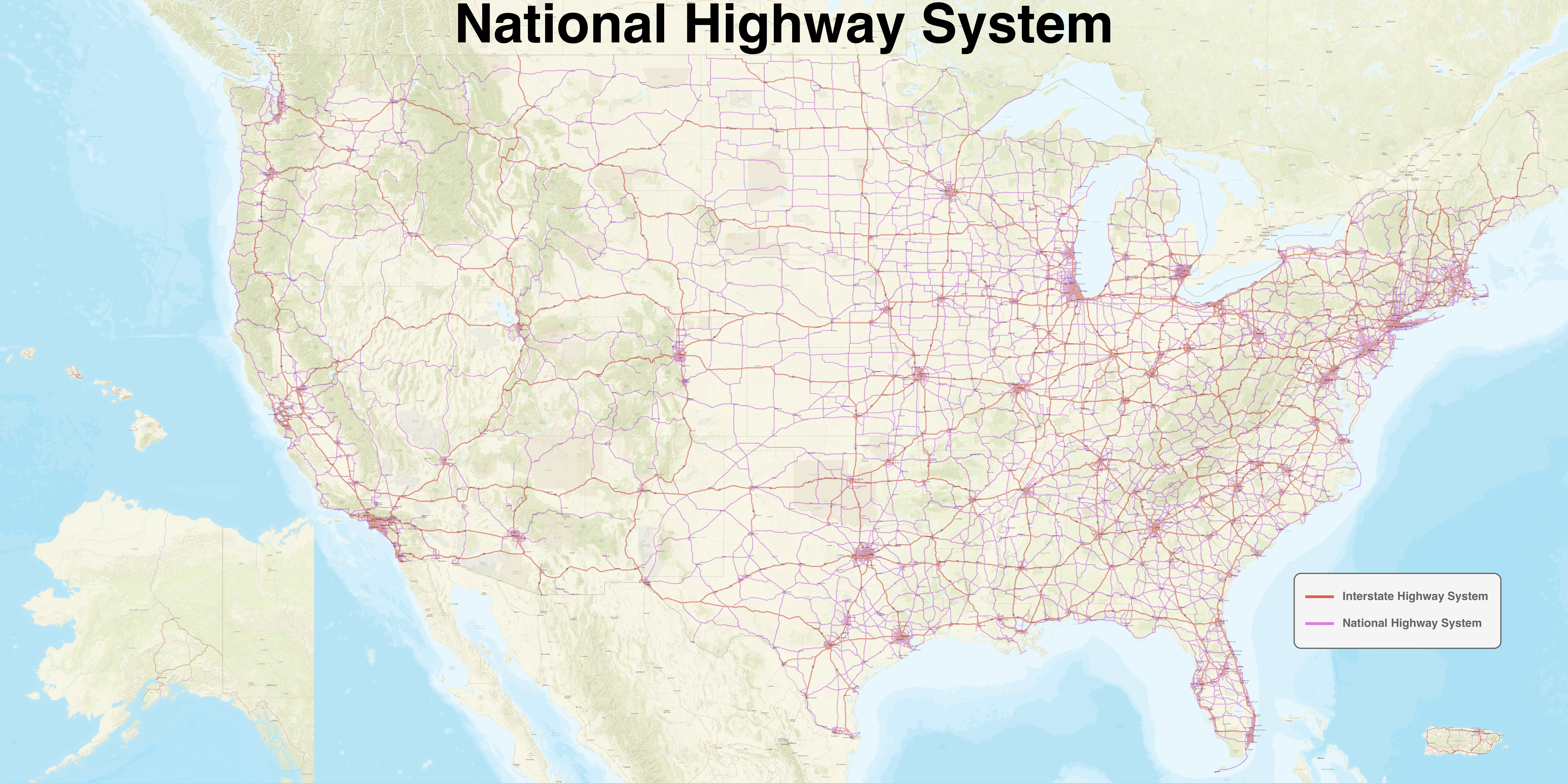
Interstate Highway System National Highway System

- Interstate Highway System
- United States Numbered Highway System
- National Highway System
- Rest areas in the United States

=== State highway systems by state ===
- List of state highways in Alabama
- List of state highways in Alaska
- List of state highways in Arizona
- List of state highways in Arkansas
- List of state highways in California
- List of state highways in Colorado
- List of state highways in Connecticut
- List of state highways in Delaware
- List of state roads in Florida
- List of state routes in Georgia (U.S. state)
- List of state highways in Hawaii
- List of state highways in Idaho
- List of state highways in Illinois
- List of state roads in Indiana
- List of state highways in Iowa
- List of state highways in Kansas
- List of state highways in Kentucky
- List of state highways in Louisiana
- List of state highways in Maine
- List of state highways in Maryland
- List of state highways in Massachusetts
- List of state highways in Michigan
- List of state highways in Minnesota
- List of state highways in Mississippi
- List of state highways in Missouri
- List of state highways in Montana
- List of state highways in Nebraska
- List of state routes in Nevada
- List of state highways in New Hampshire
- List of state highways in New Jersey
- List of state highways in New Mexico
- List of state routes in New York
- List of state highways in North Carolina
- List of state highways in North Dakota
- List of state highways in Ohio
- List of state highways in Oklahoma
- List of state highways in Oregon
- List of state highways in Pennsylvania
- List of state highways in Rhode Island
- List of state highways in South Carolina
- List of state highways in South Dakota
- List of state highways in Tennessee
- List of state highways in Texas
- List of state highways in Utah
- List of state highways in Vermont
- List of state highways in Virginia
- List of state highways in Washington
- List of state highways in West Virginia
- List of state highways in Wisconsin
- List of state highways in Wyoming

== Bridges and tunnels ==
623,000+ road bridges in the United States

- List of bridges in the United States
- List of bridges in the United States by state
- List of crossings of the Upper Mississippi River
- List of crossings of the Lower Mississippi River
- List of crossings of the Ohio River
- List of crossings of the Missouri River
- List of crossings of the Arkansas River
- List of crossings of the Columbia River
- List of crossings of the Hudson River
- List of crossings of the Delaware River
- List of crossings of the Potomac River
- List of crossings of the Connecticut River
- List of crossings of the Susquehanna River
- List of crossings of the Willamette River
- List of crossings of the Charles River
- List of crossings of the Schuylkill River
- List of crossings of the Sacramento River
- List of crossings of the Tennessee River

== Pipelines ==
=== Oil pipelines and refineries ===
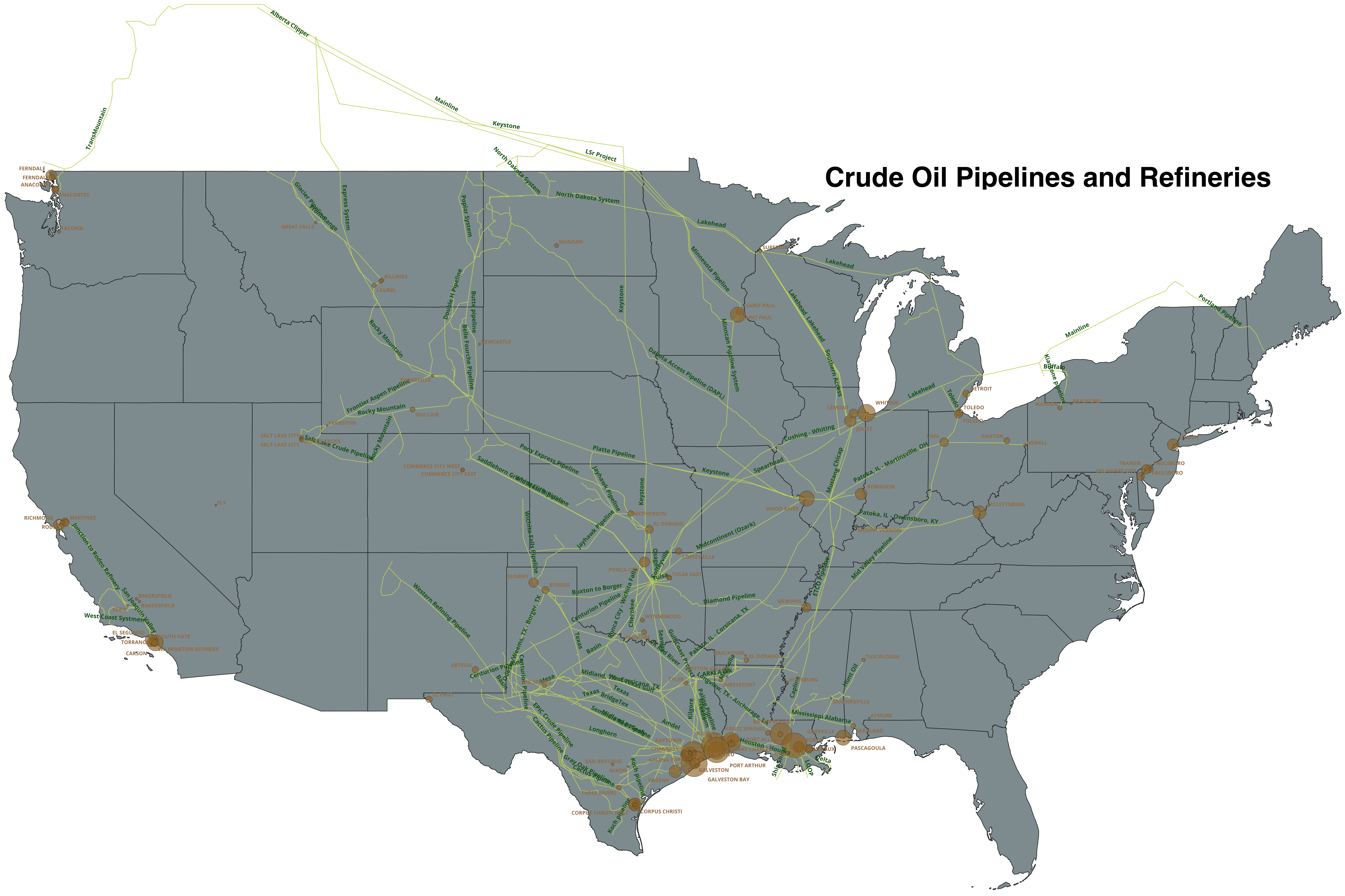
Crude oil pipelines and refineries

=== Natural gas ===
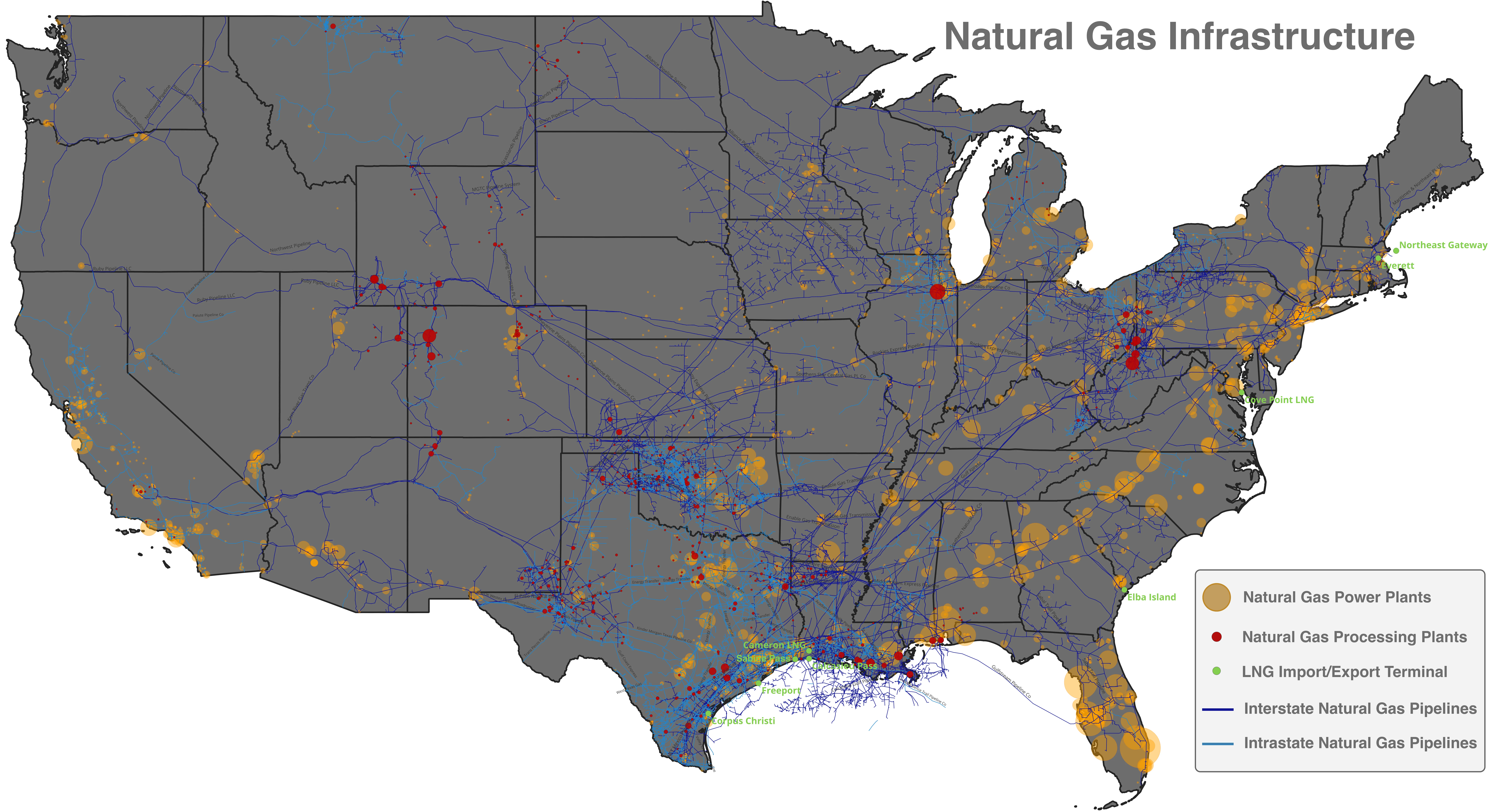
Natural gas pipeline system in the United States

LNG export facilities
Calcasieu Pass
Elba Island
Freeport
Cameron
Corpus Christi
Cove Point
Sabine Pass

== Dams ==
- List of dams and reservoirs in the United States

=== Lock & dams or canals ===
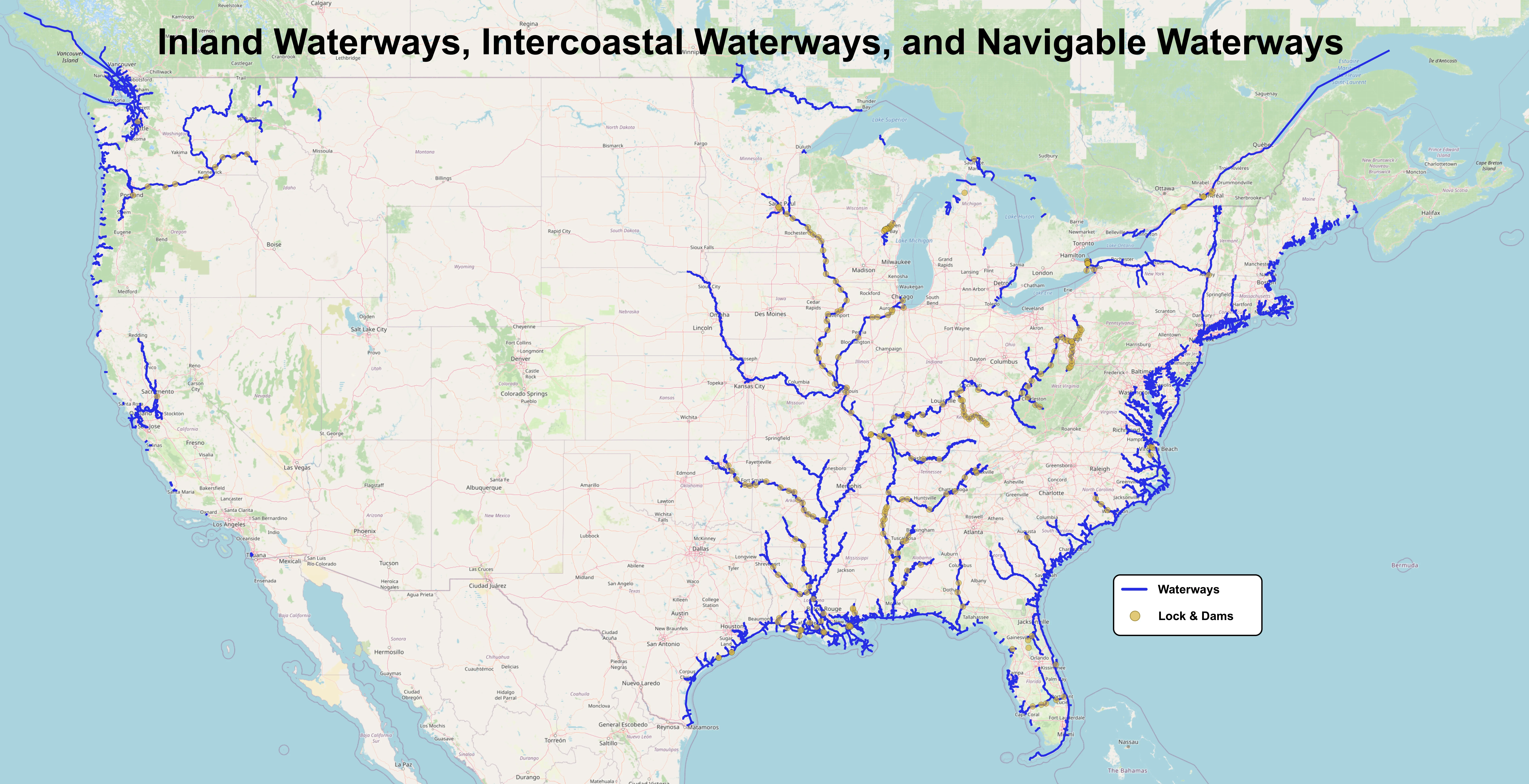
Inland waterways, intracoastal waterways, lock and dams, and navigable waterways

- List of locks and dams of the Upper Mississippi River
- List of locks and dams of the Ohio River
- Soo Locks
- Welland Canal
- St. Lawrence Seaway
- Intracoastal Waterway
- Inland waterways

== Ports ==
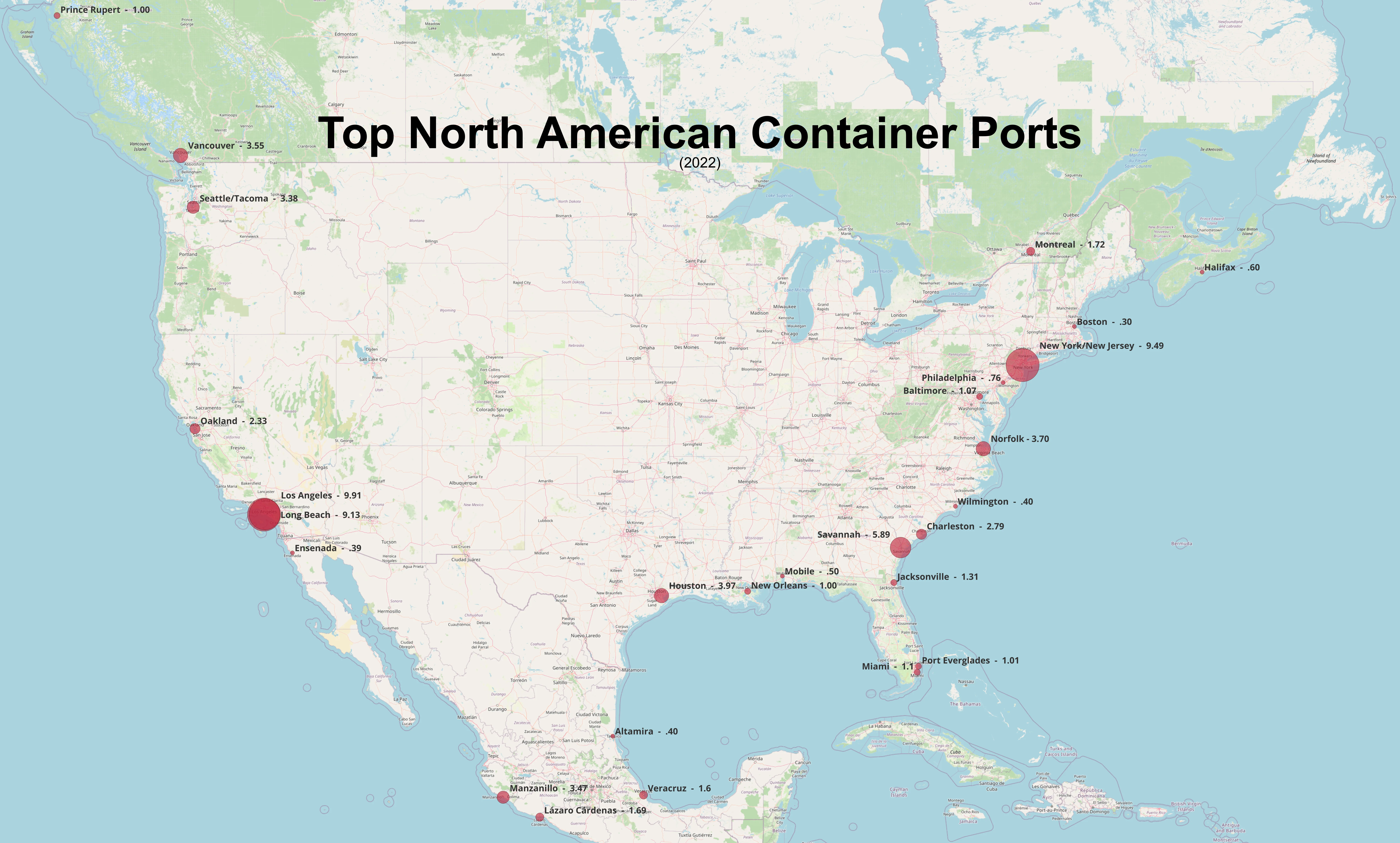
North American container ports

=== Container ports ===
- United States container ports

=== Ro-Ro ports ===
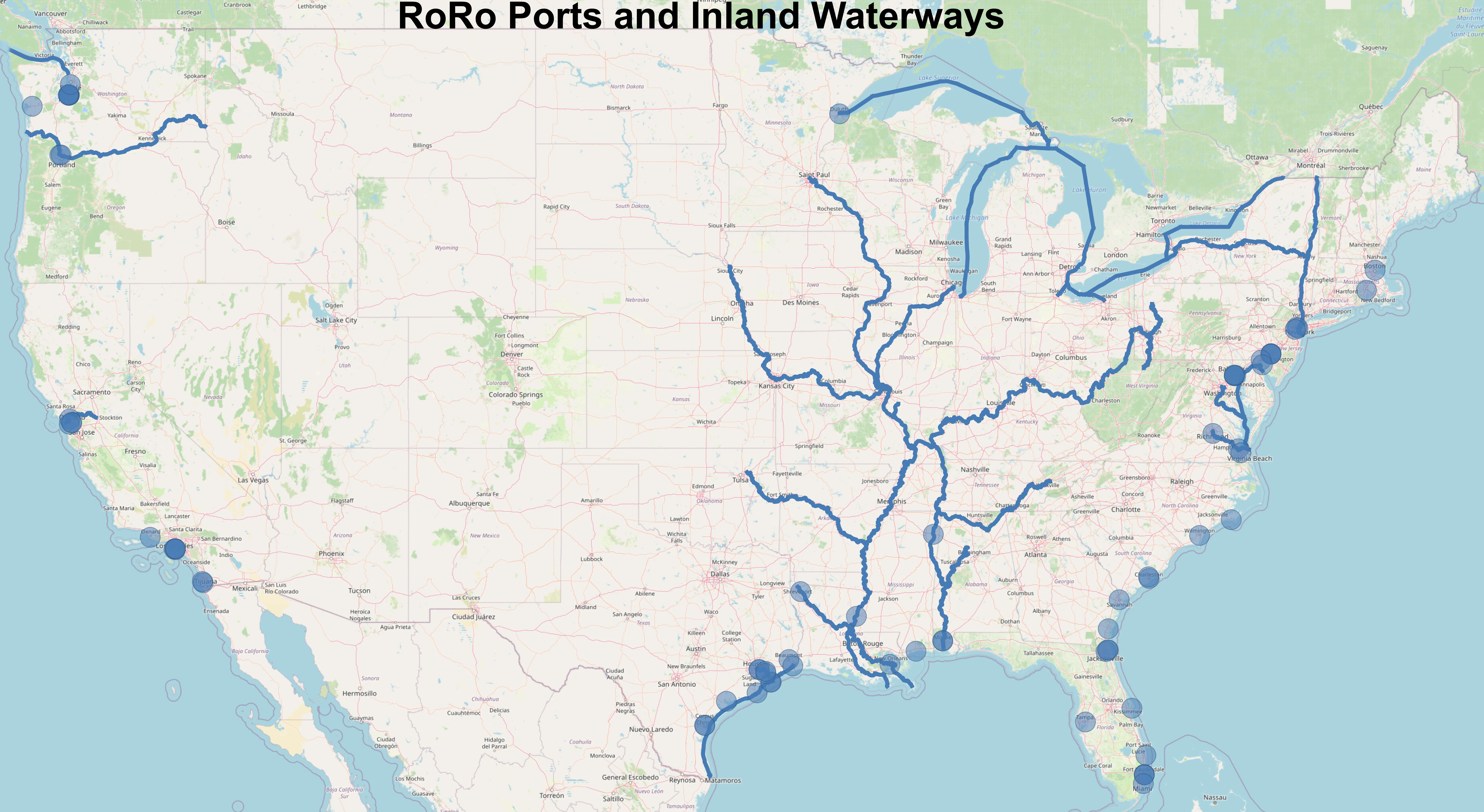
RoRo ports and inland waterways of the United States

- Port of Baltimore
- Port of Brunswick
- Port of Jacksonville
- Port of Galveston
- Port of New York and New Jersey
- Port of Los Angeles
- Port of Long Beach
- Port of Tacoma
- Port of Hueneme
- Port of San Diego

== Railroads ==
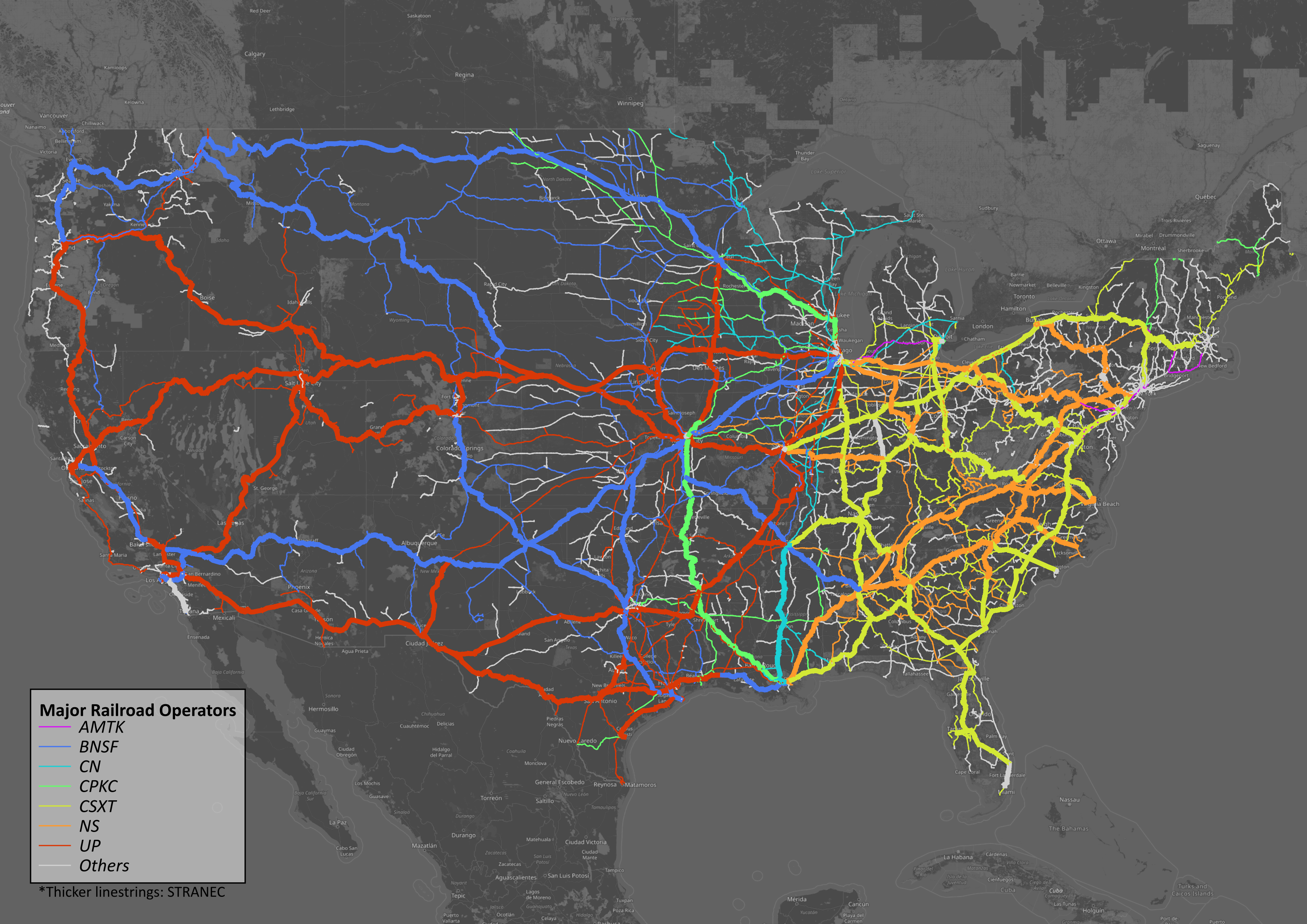
Major railroad routes map, with STRACNET-designated routes shown in thicker lines.

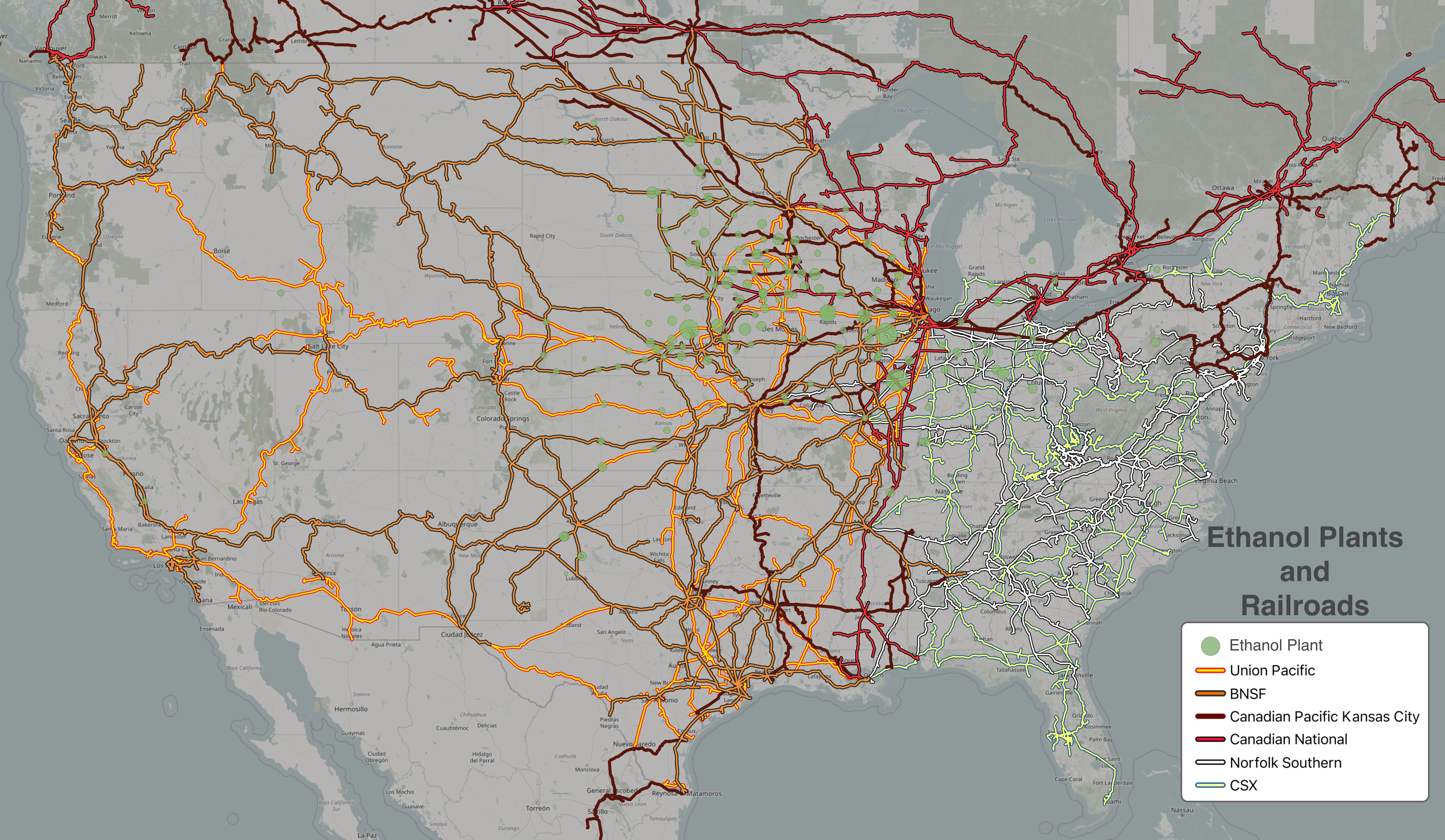
Ethanol plants in the US

- List of U.S. Class I railroads
- List of common carrier freight railroads in the United States
- List of rail transit systems in the United States
- List of rail yards in the United States

=== Intermodal terminals ===
List of some intermodal terminals:

- Corwith Yard
- Brooklyn Intermodal Rail Yard
- CenterPoint Intermodal Center

== Arenas and venues ==
- List of indoor arenas in the United States
- List of music venues in the United States
- Amphitheaters in the United States

== Aquaducts ==
- Aqueducts in the United States

== Airports ==
Top 500 airports by enplanements in the United States (2023)

- List of airports in the United States
- List of largest cargo airports in the United States

== Space ports ==
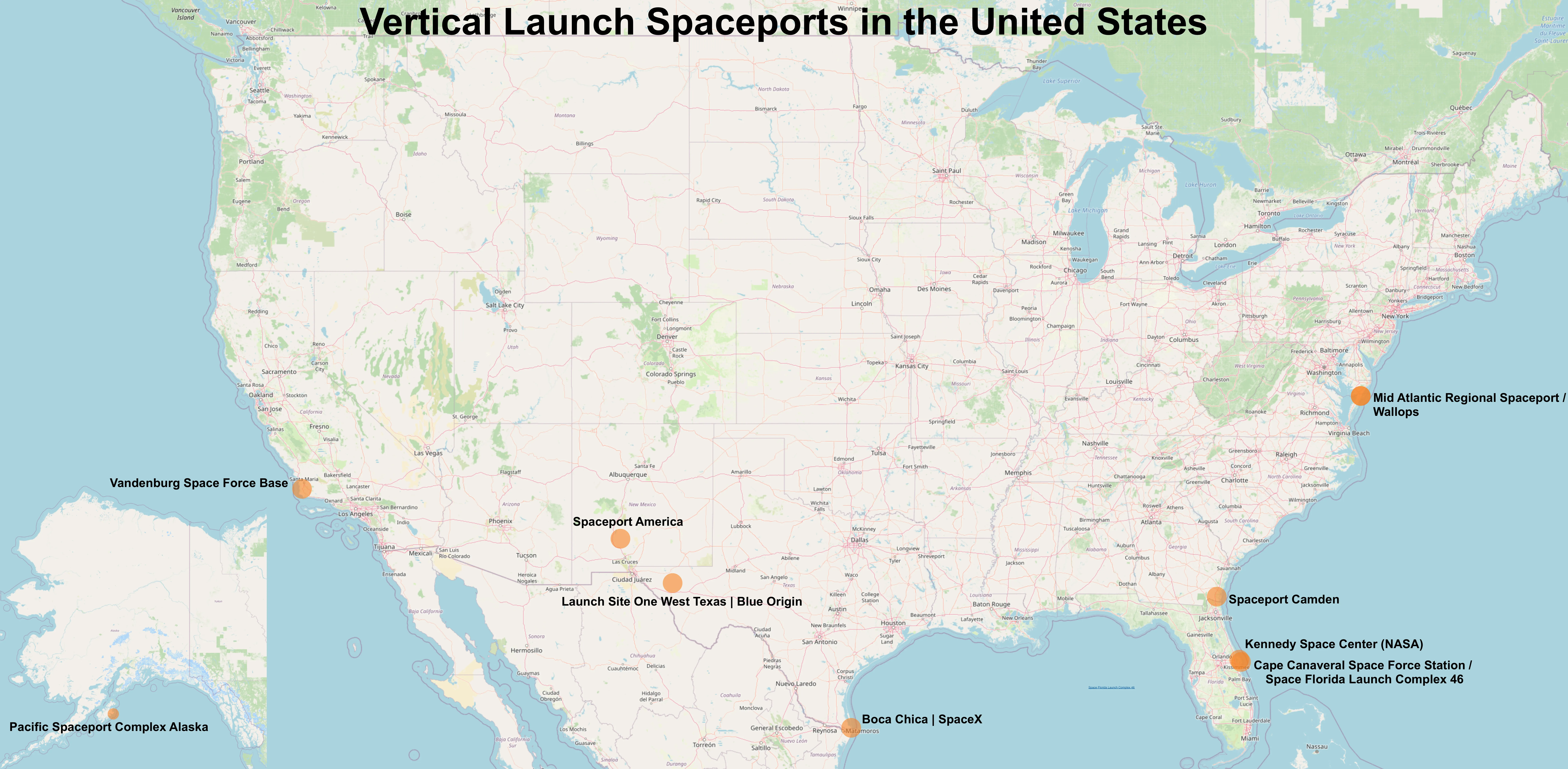
Vertical launch spaceports in the US

- List of space ports in the United States

== Hospitals ==
Private hospitals in the United States

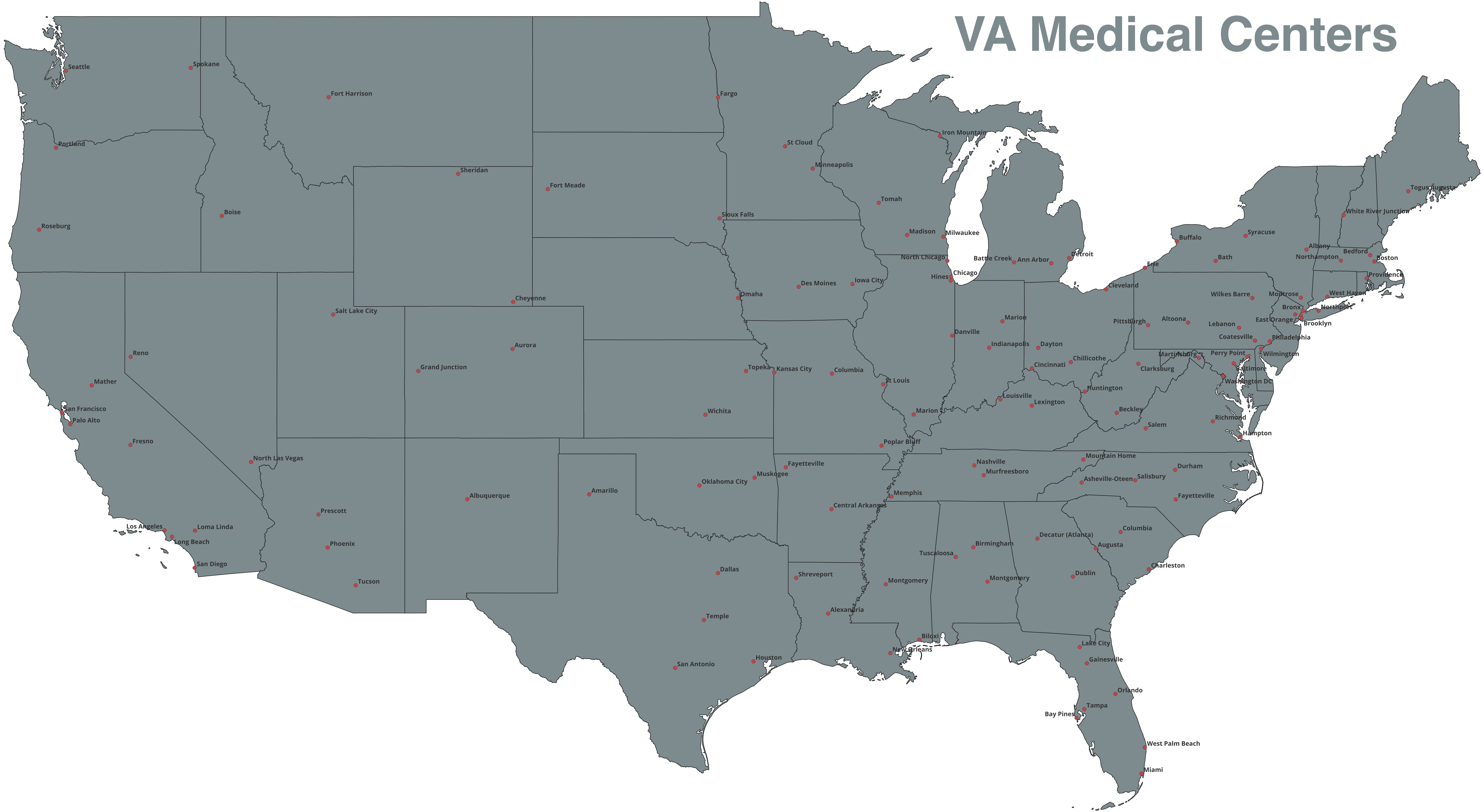
Showing 131 VA Medical Centers in the Contiguous United States

- Lists of hospitals in the United States
- List of Veterans Affairs medical facilities by state
- List of Veterans Affairs medical facilities

== Education ==
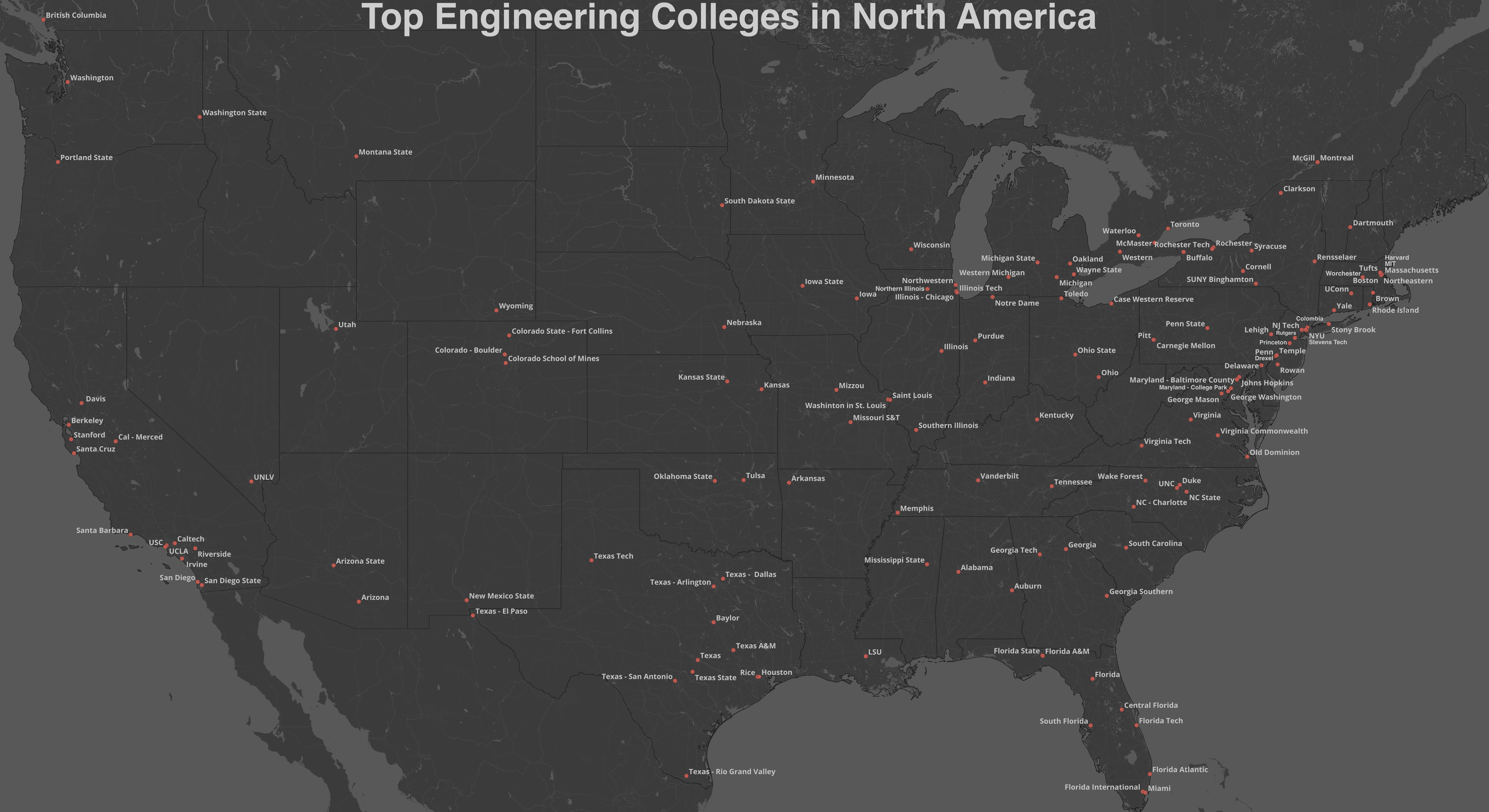
Top Engineering Colleges in North America

Public schools in the United States

Private schools in the United States

=== Colleges and universities ===
- List of colleges in the United States
- List of community colleges
- List of engineering colleges in the United States

=== High schools ===
- Lists of high schools in the United States by state or territory

=== Libraries ===
- Libraries in the United States by state or territory

== Satellites ==
=== telecommunications ===
- Starlink, Project Kuiper, Viasat, Hughes Network Systems, AST SpaceMobile

=== GPS ===
- Global Positioning System

=== Weather satellites ===
- Weather satellites of the United States

== Weather ==
- NEXRAD — 159 high-resolution S-band Doppler weather radars
- Automated airport weather station and Terminal Doppler Weather Radar
- Mesonet and Oklahoma Mesonet
- Road Weather Information System
- National Data Buoy Center
- SNOTEL — snowpack and related climate sensors operated by the Natural Resources Conservation Service (NRCS)

== Military bases ==
Foreign bases of the United States

US Military Bases Map

- List of American military installations

== Prisons ==
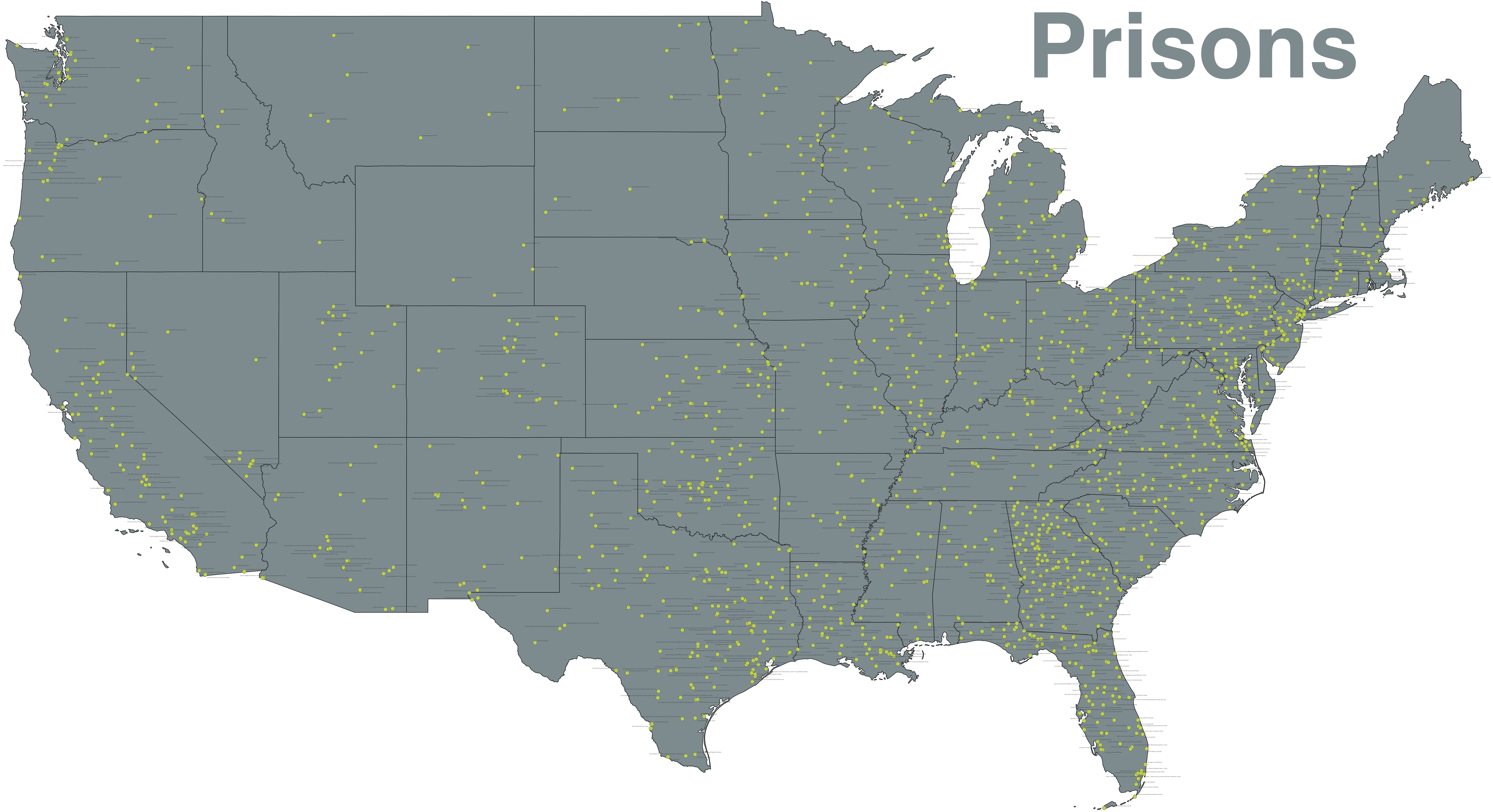
Prisons in the United States

- Lists of United States state prisons

== See also ==
- Infrastructure policy of the United States
- Lists of mines in the United States
